= Principality of Zhane =

Circassian principality (middle ages to 1802)

Principality of Zhane Жанэ Пщыгъо (Adyghe)
- Late middle ages–1802 (de facto) / 1830s (de jure)
- The tamga of the Bechqan princely house which ruled Zhane

- Seal of Prince Netakhoqo Zan (1827)

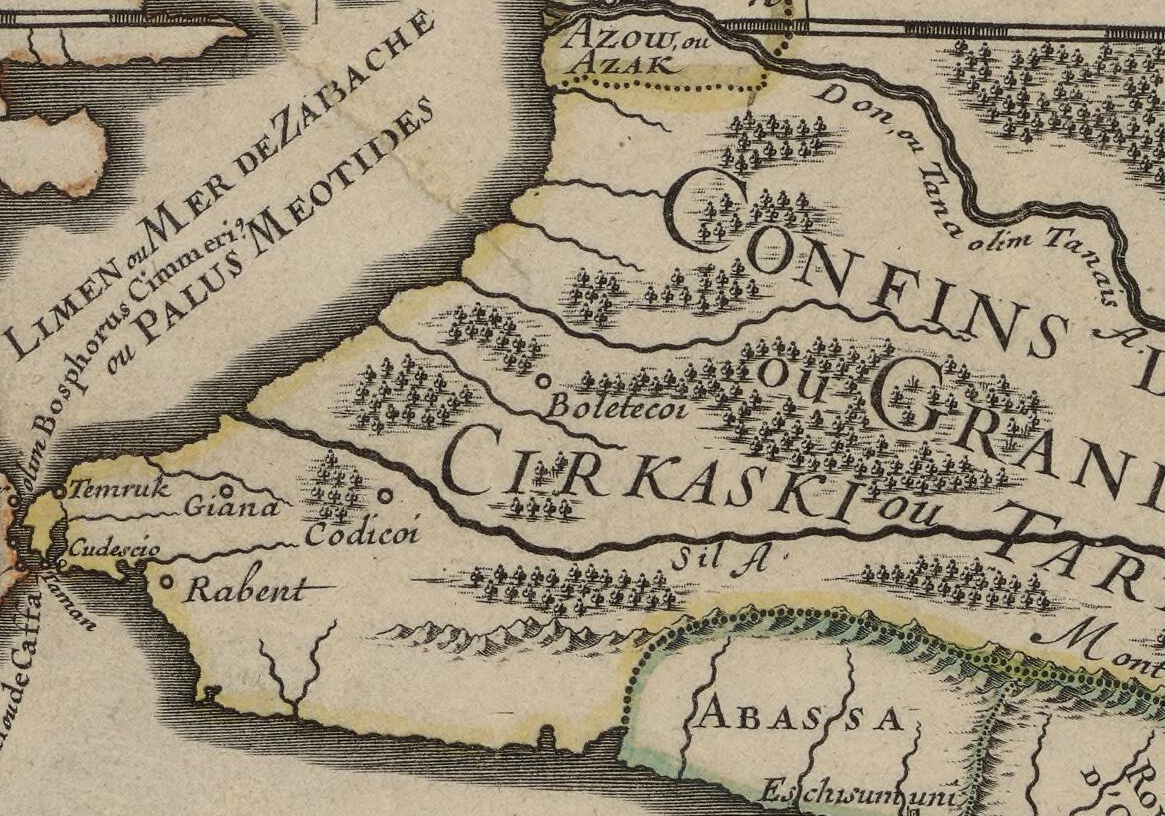
- "Giana" represents the Zhane territory on this 1681 map by Guillaume Sanson, Estats de l'Empire du Grand Seigneur des Turcs.
- Status: Principality
- Capital: Copa (?–1475) "Various" (seat of the Grand Prince)
- Common languages: Adyghe (Zhane dialect)
- Religion: Paganism & Eastern Orthodoxy (until 16th c.); Sunni Islam (Hanafi) (16th c. – 1830s)
- Demonym: Zhane
- Pshi (Prince)
  - late middle ages: Zan / Zhane
  - fl. 1460s–1470s: Barasbiyeqo
  - fl. 1538–1551: Qanshawuq
  - fl. 1555–1563: Sibequ
  - fl. 1638–1666: Antonuq
  - fl. 1787–1794: Mishawost Melichjeriy
  - fl. 1800s–1830s: Netakhoqo Zan
- Historical era: Middle Ages to early modern period
  - Established: Late middle ages
  - Accepted Ottoman Suzerainty and Sanjak Status: 1539–1555
  - Alliance with Ivan IV: 1555–1562
  - Ottoman reintegration: 1560s–18th c.
  - Civil war: 1635–1644
  - Destroyed during the Russo-Circassian War: 1802 (de facto) / 1830s (de jure)

Population
  - 1650–1700 estimate: 200,000
  - c. 1830: 400–1,200
- Currency: Akçe, Kara Akçe
Preceded by
Zichia
Succeeded by
Shapsugs
Natukhajs
Cherchenay
- Today part of: Russia (Krasnodar Krai)

The Principality of Zhane (Note: Adyghe: Жанэ Пщыгъо, romanized: Zhane Pshygho; Russian: Жанеевское княжество, romanized: Zhaneyevskoye knyazhestvo; Ottoman Turkish: جانه بگلیگی, romanized: Cāneh Beglīgī) was a Circassian principality in Circassia inhabited by the Zhane, a Circassian sub-ethnic group. During the 16th and 17th centuries, it was one of the largest and most powerful principality in Western Circassia. Their lands were a constant battlefield for centuries and this weakened them. During the Russo-Circassian War, Russian military operations and plague further reduced their population.

In 1802, a campaign by Black Sea Cossacks of the Russian Empire destroyed the remaining settlements and ended the political independence of the principality. Prince Netakhoqo Zan later tried to reunite the survivors into a single settlement. Following his death in the early 1830s, the majority integrated into the Bzhedug, Shapsug, and Natukhaj sub-ethnic groups.

== History ==
=== Formation ===
Circassia was a decentralized confederation of feudal principalities and self-governing mountain communities that coordinated on major foreign policy matters. Sub-ethnic group identities across Circassia formed primarily through political consolidation rather than distinct ancestral origins. When populations remained under the authority of specific ruling dynasties, including the Zhane, prolonged shared economic activity, military organization, and territorial residence produced distinct local dialects and sets of surnames which formed individual sub-ethnic identities under these princely domains.

==== Sanig migration hypothesis ====
Some scholars propose an origin theory that links the Zhane people to the ancient Sanigs, though this connection is unproven. According to this hypothesis, researchers Adolf Berzhe, Leonid Lavrov, N.G. Volkova, and B.Kh. Bgazhnokov propose that the Zhane were Sanigs who migrated from Transcaucasia to the Northwest Caucasus between the late 3rd and early 4th centuries due to Roman expansion. The migrants initially settled near Nicopsis and Dzhubga before advancing toward Gelendzhik, Tsemez, and Anapa. The theory posits a population split: those who migrated north became the Zhane, while those who stayed in their original territory formed the Sadz community, located between Circassian and Abkhazian lands.

==== Pre-Inal hypothesis ====
Khotko proposes a theory that the Zhane princes did not descend from Inal, suggesting instead that they might have had older or independent origins compared to other Circassian dynasties. According to this hypothesis, Russian records from 1552 and 1555 that describe the Zhane envoy princes to Moscow as sovereigns could possibly suggest a distinct status for this lineage within Circassia.

Etnographer Sultan Khan-Giray noted that the Kabardian, Besleney, Chemguy, Hatuqay, and partially Kheghache princes descended from Inal. However the Zhane is described as an indigenous or ancient Circassian group that was present in the area before Inal's descendants arrived. According to 19th-century ethnographer Leonty Lulye, the princely house of the Chopsin (house of Basteqo) was related to the Zhane princes. Chopsin princes are considered as Bzhedugs in tradition. Yu. E. Asanov proposed a hypothesis that the Zhane princes were related to the Bzhedug princes.

19th-century ethnographer Leonty Lulye noted that feudal Circassians such as Chemguys, Besleneys and Kabardians, referred to the Zhane, Natukhaj, Shapsug, Abzakh, Bzhedug and Makhosh regions as Abadze or Abadze-chil (Abazin settlements). Lulye suggested that was because of their historical location along the Black Sea coast and southern mountain slopes. Ethnographer Leonid Lavrov later interpreted these accounts to propose that the Zhane were originally Abazins who had adopted the Adyghe language. This view was rejected by other researchers because there is no Abazin linguistic influence or loanwords. 19th-century observers such as Frédéric Dubois de Montpéreux, James Stanislaus Bell, and Teofil Lapinski similarly noted that the term Abadze was applied to the Shapsugs, Natukhajs and sometimes Zhane. They clarified that despite this naming, these groups spoke Adyghe and identified as Adyghe.

==== Legends of Inal's descent ====
Attributed crown of Inal

Inal is a legendary figure who is considered to be the founder of several Circassian princely dynasties in tradition. According to the legend compiled by ethnographer Shora Nogmov, three prince brothers from Chemguy who were direct descendants of Inal; Boletuqo, Zan and Hatuqo. The younger brothers, Zan and Hatuqo, wanted to separate from the eldest brother, Boletuqo. Zan gathered people from various societies to join him and asked Boletuqo for permission to migrate to new lands. Boletuqo agreed and allowed a portion of the people to leave. Zan and his subjects moved to the area where the Pshish River meets the Kuban River, taking the name Zhane of the principality. Hatuqo also departed to settle in a newly chosen and took the name Hatuqay of the principality. Boletuqo remained in the original territory with the majority of the population and retained the Chemguy name.

According to other popular oral traditions, the origin of the Zhane princes was one of Inal's son named Zhane or Zan. In this, Inal's land was divided among four sons: Tabulda inherited the lands east of the Kuban called Qabarda, Beslan received the territory between the Kuban and Laba, Chemrug took the lands from the Laba to the Pshish, and the youngest son Zhane received the remaining territory extending to the sea.

According to Khotko's analysis, Inal may have lived at the turn of the 13th and 14th centuries. According to different hypotheses, Inal may have lived at the turn of the 14th and 15th centuries. If the Zhane princes descended from him as tradition suggests, the principality was established in the late middle ages.

Ottoman traveler Evliya Çelebi recorded a legend tracing Circassian lineages to the Arab Quraysh tribe. This group included Kheghache, Hatuqay, Zhane, Besleney, and Kabardians. This narrative originated in 14th century Mamluk Egypt, where historians constructed Arab genealogies to legitimate Circassian rule over Arab populations. The tradition later integrated into Caucasian local lore and merged with the ancestry of Inal. In one local version, five princely brothers left Arabia along with their subjects. These brothers were: Cheleshbiy, Zan, Makay, Boletuqo, and Hatuqo.

According to Zhane prince Selim's account to James Bell, the Zhane princes were of Sultanic origin. Selim told Bell that Zaneqo, Aytechuqo (the ruler branch of the Chemguy princes), and Halashuqo (Kelesh Ahmed-Bey Sharvashidze) shared a common origin and formed the Boletuqo fraternity in Chemguy, considered one of the oldest noble clans in Circassia. However, Longworth wrote that Selim claimed to be of Genoese origin and dated his house's rule back to the Genoese period, while Bell didn't mention this information despite both being present during the conversation with Selim.

=== Medieval period ===
Italian maritime charts from the 13th to the 15th centuries show a territory marked as Saunacichia or Alba Zega (White Zichia). Some researchers theorize that these names might connect to the early origins or precursors of the Zhane, though this identification remains unproven. The locations recorded as "Sania" in the 1311 and 1318 Italian maps by Pietro Vesconte, covering the Tuapse, Nicopsis, and Dzhubga regions, could refer to the Zhane Principality. In these maps, the region of Sania is located between Mauro Zega, or Black Zikhia, which was conquered by the Mongols, and Alba Zega, or White Zikhia, which maintained its independence.

An analysis of Caucasus geography by the Arab geographer Abulfeda in 1321 identifies a distinct political entity named "al-Anjaz", which several historians theorize refers to the Zhane. His accounts describe a "al-Kasak" state situated between al-Anjaz and the Alans ("al-Lan"). Abulfeda also introduces the concept of "al-Dajarkis" (Circassia) as a larger, populated federation that included both regions, indicating that if al-Anjaz indeed refers to the Zhane, they were recognized both as an independent unit and as part of the broader Circassian realm by the early 14th century.

In the 1380s, an Golden Horde governor in Solkhat was mentioned with the names Jhancasius, lord of Zichia (lo segnor Zicho), and Circassian lord (Jharcasso segnor). It is highly probable that this was a Zhane prince in the service of the Golden Horde.

Italian maritime charts from the 15th century place the Zhane in the coastal region of Zichia. These maps often record the area as "Sannia" or "Sanna" and show their settlement in the mountains and coast between Tuapse, Nykopsis, and Dzhubga. A 1480 map by Grazioso Benincasa uses the term "Sanna Zichia" ("Zhane Zichia"), showing that Italian cartographers saw the Zhane principality as an organized entity along the coast, able to compete with neighboring principalities like Kheghache, Hatuqay, Chemguy, and Kabardia.

=== 15th Century ===
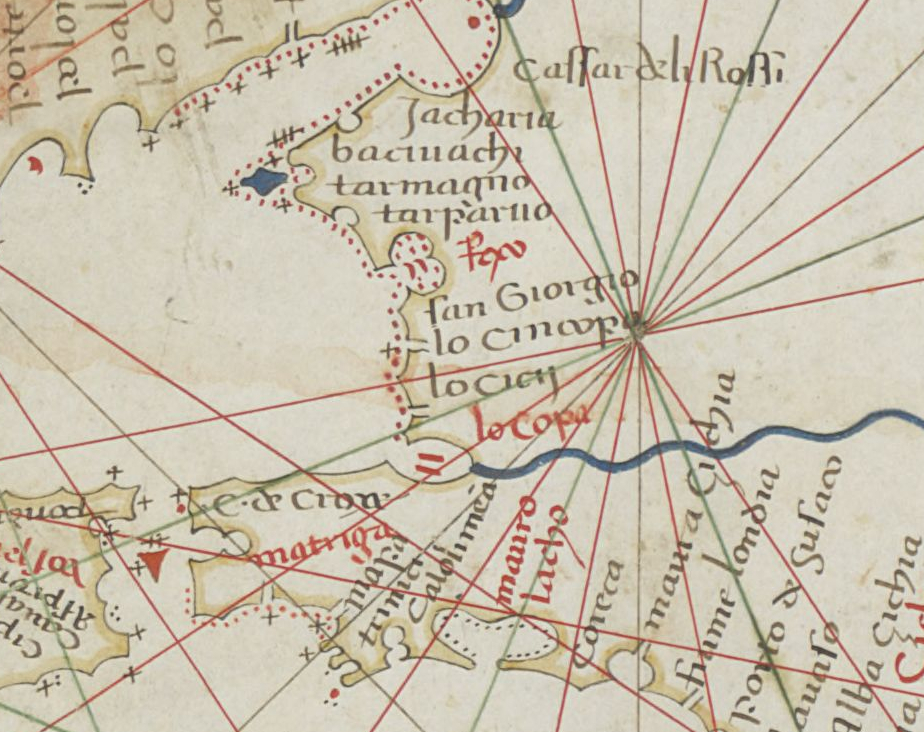
Copa and other ports in the eastern Sea of Azov in the 1466 Portolan Atlas.

During the 15th century, the region later associated with the Zhane was identified in Genoese sources as the Copa. Copa functioned alongside Matrega (the capital of the Hytuk) as one of the two main urban centers in Zichia (Circassia). The city was located on the right bank of the Kuban River, approximately 28 Italian miles from its mouth (near modern-day Slavyansk-on-Kuban). The territory of the principality covered the area between the Kuban River and the Sea of Azov. The principality controlled the wide plains along the right bank of the Kuban and the low coastal areas along the Sea of Azov. It also held military influence over the entire eastern coast of the Sea of Azov.

The ruler who was recorded in Italian documents was Prince Berzebuk (Dominus Coparii Berzebuch), which is possibly Barasabiyeqo in Adyghe. Governance was shared with his wife, Borunda (Domina Borunda), and their son was "Kambelot," which is Qambolet in Adyghe.

Trade formed the basis of relations between Copa and the Genoese administration based in Caffa. Under the 1449 Caffa statute, a Genoese consul was appointed to Copa annually. The consul resided in the city seasonally from spring until September to coincide with the fishing season. The consul's responsibilities included setting fish prices jointly with the local prince and protecting Genoese commercial interests. In exchange for trade access, the administration in Caffa paid an annual tribute, termed "exenia," to the local Zichian princes. Commercial activities centered on fish, caviar, grain, honey, and wax.

In 1462, the Caffa administration signed an agreement with Berzebuk regarding the recruitment of mercenaries. Around 1470, Berzebuk constructed a stone castle in Copa. Berzebuk secured building materials through a secret arrangement despite opposition from Caffa officials, who expressed concern over his growing authority. Genoese officials in Caffa held secret negotiations to incite Circassian princes against Berzebuk, though the impact of these attempts is not documented. In response to Berzebuk's fortification efforts, the Bank of San Giorgio enforced a strict trade embargo and banned the sale of construction materials, which Genoese merchants immediately violated to continue profitable trade with Circassia. In 1471, Caffa deployed an armed vessel (fusta) to protect merchant ships from Berzebuk's piracy. Later that year, envoy Cavalino Cavallo negotiated an agreement with Berzebuk and neighboring princes and they signed a formal peace treaty between Berzebuk and Caffa on December 15, 1472.

In June 1475, Ottoman forces under Gedik Ahmed Pasha captured Caffa while some units of the fleet moved to the eastern Black Sea coast. Ottoman sources referred to Copa as "Yabu-germen." Local princes (including Berzebuk) killed while defending the city. Ottoman forces withdrew later in 1475 without establishing permanent control. In 1479, a second campaign commanded by Gedik Ahmed Pasha resulted in the capture and destruction of Copa and Anapa. Following the operations in 1475 and 1479, the Ottomans didn't keep a permanent military presence in the settlement units. The settlement stayed militarily empty during this time. Ottoman control in the region was established with the building of the Temryuk fortress between 1516 and 1519.

==== Internal rivalry and Crimean intervention (1498) ====
An internal power struggle and rivalry among the Zhane princes led to external military intervention in 1498. Prince "Antonon" requested military assistance from the Crimean Khan Mengli Giray to gain an advantage over his rivals.

Following the Crimean intervention, Antonuq and a group of Circassian leaders recognized the Crimean Khan as a higher authority. This political relationship was maintained through a loyalty oath and the presentation of regular gifts. Mengli Giray documented this development in a 1498 letter to the Russian Tsar Ivan III, stating that a delegation led by "Aytek" (Aytech) had arrived to present tribute. Linguistic analysis shows that the name Antonon is a variant of Antonok (Antonuq), combining the Latin root Anton with the Adyghe suffix -qo, meaning son.

=== 16th Century ===
The 1498 intervention had demonstrated the capacity of the Crimean Khanate to participate in internal conflicts within Circassia, though the arrangement was temporary. By 1501, Mengli Giray reported that the political compliance of the region had ended and that it was outside his control.

Around 1500, Giorgio Interiano observed the lifestyle of Circassians north of Copa. He noted that military campaigns were conducted by Circassians across the ice toward Crimea when the sea froze during the winter and Circassians surpassed the Tatars in the quality of their weapons and horses.

==== Ottoman relations and administration ====
In 1519, the fortress of Djana ("Cana") was constructed in the south of Taman to strengthen Ottoman influence along the Black Sea coast and control over the local Circassian populations. In Ottoman administrative records, this region became known as the "Dzhaney Vilayet," with the fortress serving as a crucial fortification to secure the coastline.

Researchers date the oral-tradition-based Bakhchysarai campaign to 1535–1536. Led by Kabardian prince Talostan Jankhot, the army advanced from the foothills to the Taman Peninsula for the element of surprise. Since Taman was controlled by the Zhane and Kheghache principalities, the Kabardians allied with them to cross into the Crimea by ship. This combined Circassian force besieged and captured Bakhchysarai, then withdrew back via Taman after the Crimean Khanate paid a tribute.

According to the 1529 registers, a Zhane community ("Zânî cemaati") resided in Cevizi, a neighborhood of the Azak Fortress. They were recorded as having a population of 17 households and 3 single individuals.

According to oral traditions about the legendary Battle of Kyzburun, which Zaurbek Kojev dates to 1537 or 1538, the Principality of Zhane participated as part of the coalition supporting Prince Yidar. Zhane forces participated in the Western Circassian coalition that defeated the Kabardian princes and their Abaza allies near the Baksan River. Yidar became the Grand Prince of Kabardia and reclaimed his inherited lands.

In 1538, the Ottoman state listed the Zhane (Jana) region as a vilayet. Prince Qanshawuq (Adyghe: Къаншъаукъу), who was referred as "Kansavuk", accepted Ottoman suzerainty in 1539. He received the title of sancakbey, a salary, a gold-headed banner and a horsetail staff. He promised to protect the region as an Ottoman subject. From 1539 onwards, by order of the Bey of Caffa, the Zhane population paid a fixed jizya, which is the tax paid by non-Muslim Ottoman subjects.

==== 1539 Crimean campaign ====
Remmal Hoca (Kaysuni-zade Mehmed Nidai), a court geomancer and historian, chronicled the reign of Crimean Khan Sahib I Giray (1532–1551). Researchers describe him as a "panegyrist historian" whose primary objective was to glorify his patron's military campaigns, including those in Circassia. Consequently, his work, Tārih-i Şāhib Giray Hān, is characterized by a hagiographic perspective.

18th century Crimean historian Abdul Gaffar Effendi used a mid-16th-century source, the Sâhib-Gerey Han Vakayi-nâmesi which he included in the Umdetü'l-Ahbâr, to provide information on the period. While some events are completely contradictory between these two sources, the basic course of events are similar.

In the second half of 1539, Halil Bey, the Sanjak-bey of Caffa, informed the Crimean Khan that Kabardian Circassians, with the support of Kuban Circassians, stole goods from the Taman Peninsula and transported them away. In May and June, the Crimean Khan Sahib Giray I led a military campaign with an army of 40,000 men against the Zhane Principality. The campaign was launched because the Zhane prince Qanshawuq was held responsible for the previous attacks on Ottoman territories on the Taman Peninsula. Halil Bey had provided a fleet for logistics and accompanied the Crimean troops to the fortress of Temryuk.

Sahib Giray summoned Qanshawuq along other princes, who came to ask for forgiveness, and questioned him about his army size. When Qanshawuq stated he had 15,000 soldiers, the Khan became angry and accused him of breaking his oath despite having the power to prevent the attacks:

Because you have so many soldiers, the fortunate Sultan granted you a salary and bestowed upon you a golden-headed banner. You guaranteed that no enemy ship would cause harm to Taman Peninsula. You made a vow, saying, 'If a single person loses even a sheep, I shall give them an ox in its place.' Yet, while you sit only a day's journey away, a few Circassian thieves come, raid the peninsula, and torment the Muslims, and you remain indifferent to it. What kind of loyal servant to the Sultan are you? I shall first deal with you, and then I shall find them.

According to Remmal Hoca, the Khan ordered Qanshawuq to receive 10,000 lashes and to be hanged the next day if he wouldn't be dead from lashes. Qanshawuq's relatives asked Halil Bey to mediate, offering 20 slaves to Caffa Bey, 100 to the Khan, and 200 to the Ottoman Sultan. Halil Bey intervened, Qanshawuq's life was spared, and he left hostages in Temryuk while returning to his lands to prepare the slaves. Sahib Giray then launched a campaign to Western Circassia with 40,000 soldiers, captured many locals, but a Circassian guide directed the army into rugged terrain, ending the expedition without military success.

==== 1545 Crimean campaign ====
In the spring of 1545, Qanshawuq refused to send the annual slaves and gifts to the Ottoman Sultan and the Crimean Khan. He detained four men sent to collect the gifts and his men robbed Taman residents and stole animals. He declared that he would no longer accept these state demands or pay taxes. Qanshawuq insulted the Ottoman authorities against the Ottoman state and Islam, questioned what the Sultan or the Khan could do to him.

Sahib Giray ordered Halil Bey to prepare ships in Kerch for a second campaign. The Khan prepared 20,000 soldiers and went to Caffa where he camped at Sarıgöl. Halil Bey prepared 300 ships and 500 boats to transport the army across the strait. With the Ottoman Sultan's approval, the army, which included musketeers, Janissaries, and artillery, crossed the strait.

===== Battle of Mount Kıdımit =====
According to Umdetü'l-Ahbâr, Upon seeing the Khan's army approaching, Qanshawuq gathered his forces and took position on Mount "Kıdımit". According to Remmal Hoca, the Crimean army crossed the Kuban river and camped at Mount "Hıtıbıt". A. M. Nekrasov equate Mount Khitybyt (associated with Mount Tkhab) with the Ketsekhur range between Tsemes (Novorossiysk) and Pshada.

According to Umdetü'l-Ahbâr, Sahib Giray sent envoys to demand Qanshawuq's submission. Qanshawuq rejected responded by ordering that the noses of the envoys be cut off before sending them back. However, according to Remmal Hoca, at the Temryuk Fortress, Sahib Giray ordered the firing of 30 cannons and 1,000 muskets, and the sound was heard from three days away. Upon hearing the artillery, Qanshawuq lost consciousness from fear, and his companions revived him by splashing water on his face. Qanshawuq gathered the elders and they decided to offer 500 slaves to the Khan and 1,000 to the Sultan. He sent an envoy of twenty men with this peace offer. The Khan rejected the offer, had the men beaten with whip, cut off the noses and ears of two envoys, and sent them back. After this event, Qanshawuq's force of 15,000 men blamed him and mostly dispersed, leaving him with only 2,000 men. This event is the first major example of contradictions between the two sources regarding the rebellion.

According to Umdetü'l-Ahbâr, Qanshawuq's forces defeated the vanguard of the Crimea, but the main Crimean army forced them to abandon their positions. According to Remmal Hoca, the Crimean forces reached the Zhane, where the defenders had dug trenches. The Zhane warriors launched a night attack on the Khan's camp, but the Tatar units surrounded and destroyed or captured them. The next morning, the Khan's army launched a general attack on the Circassian positions. The battle lasted less than an hour, and the Zhane forces suffered heavy losses and defeat. Qanshawuq fled into the forest with a few men. Tatar soldiers looted the surrounding area for fifteen days, capturing "50,000" prisoners and chaining more than 100 "mirzas" (noblemen). In exchange for the release of the captured noblemen, between 20 and 50 slaves were demanded for each of them.

===== Retreat to Kabardia =====
According to Umdetü'l-Ahbâr, Qanshawuq first fled to Bzhedugia, then fled to Kabardia. Sahib Giray had returned to Crimea for a period, but he mobilized his forces again upon learning that Qanshawuq was gathering troops in Kabardia and blocking the Taman-Kıdımit route, and entered Kabardia through Azak (Azov). The Khan's army reached the headwaters of the Terek rivers, an area mentioned in sources as "Kolkuçin". This location is a small waterside spot known as "Beştepe" or "Beşdağ" in Ottoman sources and spesifically "Kaşkadağ" (Kashkatau) area. The army was advancing by setting up temporary camps and established their base by this water for the night. Qanshawuq gathered a large force from the local people and his loyalists in Kabardia where he had taken refuge. This army had consisted of more than 10,000 Kabardians. According to Remmal Hoca, in the autumn of 1545, Qanshawuq traveled to Kabardia with 200 men to seek allies following his defeat. He proposed an alliance against the Crimean Khan to the local rulers and suggested capturing Azak fortress to sever the Khan's supply lines. The Kabardians refused this proposal due to the proximity of the Crimean army and ordered Qanshawuq to leave, which caused him to lose his political influence.

===== The night attack =====
According to Umdetü'l-Ahbâr, knowing that the Khan's army had numerical superiority and better firepower, Qanshawuq avoided a direct open battle and instead planned a night attack. The Crimean troops were caught unprepared, resting in the open by the water without a proper defensive line. Qanshawuq's cavalrymen launched an assault that caused a mass confusion in the Khan's army. Qanshawuq's forces routed many Crimean soldiers and scattered the military formation. The Crimean soldiers abandoned their positions and were forced to flee toward the "Kömesi-Suyu", which is known today as "Kuma-Suyu" or "Kumi".

===== End of the campaign =====
The following day, Sahib Giray reorganized his troops and launched a counterattack. The Crimean army encircled the Circassian forces from both sides. The majority of Qanshawuq's army were killed, and many were taken prisoner. Qanshawuq fled toward the Kuma River with a small number of men. The Crimean army continued to follow his route and captured his family, relatives, and some Zhane people in the Baksan region. Qanshawuq retreated to the upper reaches of the Urup River and the mountains north of "Sokum". After the rebellion crushed, Sahib Giray relocated some of the captives to Crimea and settled them there, re-establishing his administrative control in the region. As a result of these events, Qanshawuq's military power declined, and the Zhane Principality weakened.

According to Remmal Hoca, the Crimean army returned to Bakhchysarai via Temryuk, Kerch, and Caffa. Victory letters and slaves were sent to the Ottoman Sultan and neighboring leaders. In 1551, Sahib Giray organized a new campaign because Hatuqay princes Aledjuq and Antenuq attacked pilgrim caravans. While in the Kabardia region, the Khan asked about Qanshawuq's location. An envoy reported that Qanshawuq had come to them with 200 men seeking allies. Qanshawuq lost his political influence and searched for a place to take refuge far from his lands.

==== Alliance with Russia (1555–1562) ====
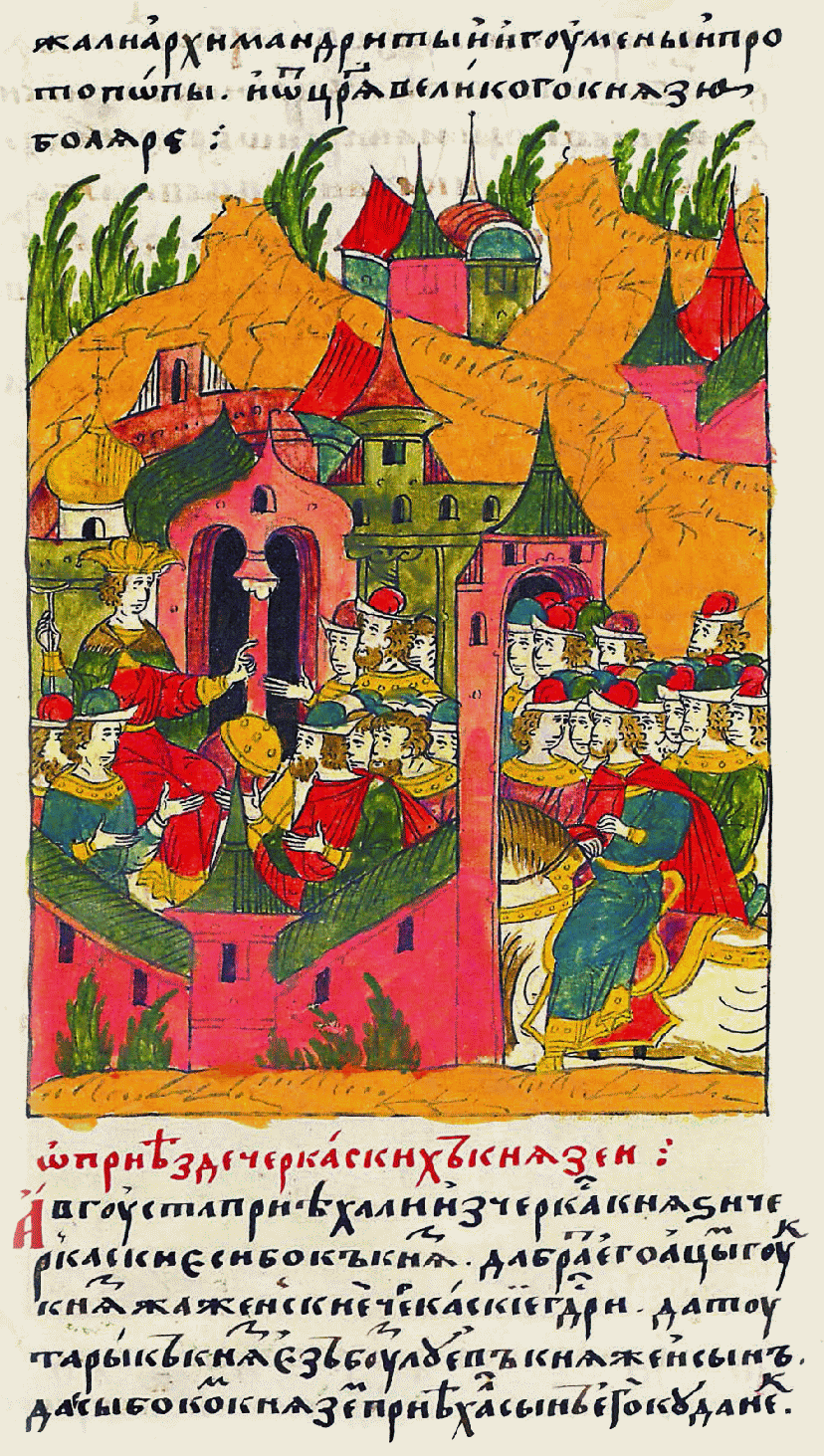
"On the Arrival of the Circassian Princes. In August, Circassian princes arrived from Circassia — Prince Sibok and his brother, Prince Atsymguk, the Zhane Circassian rulers, along with Prince Tutaryk, son of Prince Yezbuluy; and Prince Sibok was accompanied by his son, Kudanek" from the Illustrated Chronicle of Ivan the Terrible. (Note: The artists relied on medieval Russian and Byzantine templates instead of direct observation. Under the principle of collective spirit, figures used repeated face templates and standard Russian clothing to represent groups rather than real individuals. Different events were combined into a single symbolic scene. These miniatures offer a symbolic theological vision rather than an accurate historical depiction.)

The Zhane Principality established diplomatic contacts with the Tsardom of Russia because of military pressure from the Crimean Khanate and the Ottoman Empire. Prince Sibequ (Adyghe: Сибэкъу), or "Sibok" in historical sources, the son of Qanshawuq, led the second major Circassian delegation to Moscow in August 1555. This delegation included 100 noblemen, his brother "Antsmugok" or "Atsymguk", and Sibequ's eldest son "Kudanek". Kudanek's real name in Adyghe is Qudenet (Adyghe: Къудэнет) and Atsymguk's is Adzimguq (Adyghe: Адзымгукъу). The delegation was sent by the decision of a large Circassian council.

Qudenet stayed in Moscow as an amanat (hostage), where he was baptized as Alexander and got educated at the Russian court alongside the deposed Kazan Khan, Alexander (Utameshgaray). In the 1550s Court Notebook, he was registered as a service prince. Alexander served in the Tsar's personal entourage during the siege of Polotsk, where he was Tsar's court squire.

The first delegation in November 1552 was led by thee Grand Prince of Besleney, Makhoshoqo Qanoqo along with Abazins. The goal of the Zhane princes in making an alliance with Russia was to get military assistance to capture the Ottoman fortresses on the Taman Peninsula. The Russian Tsar Ivan IV stated that Russia didn't want to start a conflict with the Ottoman Empire and rejected the request for help against these fortresses, but he promised protection to the Circassians against the Crimean Khanate in the return of an oath of allegiance to the Tsar.

Trusting the promised support, in October 1556, Zhane forces under the command of Sibequ and his brother "Tazdruy" attacked the Ottoman areas and forts on the coast. They captured the Ottoman coastal fortifications of Temryuk and Taman on the Taman Peninsula. This campaign was carried out at the same time as Dmytro Vyshnevetsky's operations on the Dnieper line. In January 1558, Sibequ and Makhoshoqo settled to Moscow along their families and noblemen. The princes who arrived in Moscow accepted Christianity and were baptized there; Sibequ took the name Vasily, while Makhoshoqo took the name Ivan.

In the second half of the 16th century, Zhane princes were mostly Muslim. This religious identity occurred alongside political alliances that shifted based on circumstance. However, a prince might adopt a religion to maintain a political alliance, yet continue to serve a different power. For example; "Tsurak" (Adyghe: ЦIэракIу) a Muslim Zhane prince, had allied with Dmytro Vyshnevetskyi against the Ottomans in the early 1560s.

The "newly baptized" Circassian princes, Ivan (Makhoshoqo) and Vasily (Sibequ), participated in the Russian army's Livonian War in 1558. The Tsar personally ordered the army of the Circassian princes to be positioned within the vanguard of the armies. Prince Sibequ and his brothers along with the Besleney prince Makhoshoqo had joined with a military force of about 5,000 men under their command.

In the summer of 1559, Dmytro Vyshnevetsky and Zhane warriors besieged the Ottoman-controlled fortress of Azak. In September 1559, the Zhane prince "Ichyuruk" arrived in Moscow and declared his allegiance to the Tsar. Ichyuruk requested that the Russian Tsar send a Russian governor to the region and asked for the baptism of the Zhane people. Ichyuruk's original name in Adyghe is Yelzheruq (Adyghe: Елджэрыкъу).

In the winter of 1559–1560, troops under the command of Dmytro Vyshnevetsky and Circassians under the command of Prince Qanshawuq ("Kansuk"), the son Sibequ, continuously attacked and continued to siege the Azak Fortress. Qanshawuq was the son of Sibequ and was named after his grandfather. They also attempted to cross the Taman Strait, infiltrate into Crimea, and attack the fortress of Caffa. However, these attempts largely failed with the arrival of the Ottoman navy in the region.

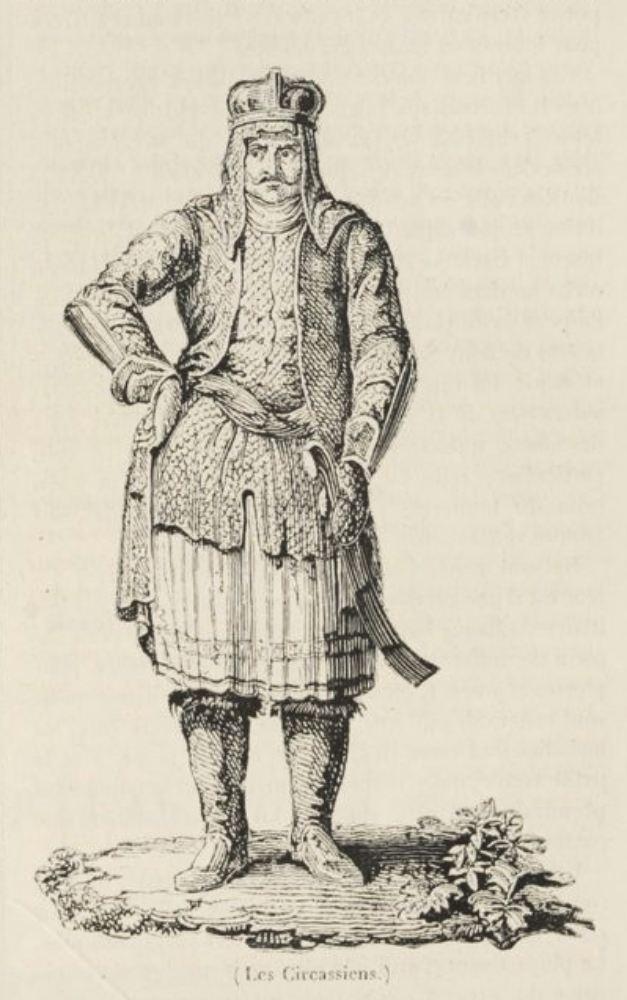
A Circassian prince

Prior to November 1559, the Kabardian and Zhane Circassians formed an alliance and launched an attack on Taman and clashed with "Shuca" Bey, the Bey of Caffa. In the spring of 1559, Dmytro Vishnevetsky advanced via the Don River to besiege Azak Fortress. During this siege, a detachment of 400 Circassians supported Vyshnevetsky. The Bey of Caffa arrived with his fleet, leading to a fierce naval battle. Following Vyshnevetsky's defeat and retreat, the Circassian detachment continued to fight. A cavalry counterattack from inside the fortress forced the Circassians to retreat. An Ottoman imperial decree published on November 23, 1559, contained defense orders for the Crimean Khan. The document reported that Circassians allied with Moscow, under the leadership of the Zhane ("Zhanoglu clan"), carried out attacks against Ottoman properties in Taman and Caffa. The decree stated that the "Taman Circassians started a rebellion". The Crimean Khan reported that he repelled these attacks and captured some of the Circassian leaders.

In 1560, Zhane princes along Vyshnevetsky planned a joint attack on Azak. The strategy required Vyshnevetsky to attack from the Don River side while Zhane forces to strike from Southeast of the fortress. Because Vyshnevetsky delayed his attack, Sinan Bey, the Sanjak-bey of Caffa, learned of the plan and launched a preemptive attack against Zhane forces. Following intense combat, Kansuk and one of his brothers killed in action. The Ottomans sent the heads of these dead Circassian princes and Russian commanders that were along with them to Istanbul.

In February 1560, Ivan IV sent Russian governor Dmytro Vyshnevetsky alongside Circassian princes Sibequ and Makhoshoqo to Western Caucasus with Christian priests to baptize Zhane leaders and organize them against the Crimean Khanate. Following a tip from a Polish envoy, Crimean Khan Devlet Giray launched a major military campaign into Circassia. As a result of this intervention, Vishnevetskiy left the region due to a lack of support from Moscow, and Sibequ's sons fled to Poland. In 1560, the Ottoman Sultan rewarded Sinan Bey for his actions in defending the Azak Fortress. Sinan Pasha received 30,000 akçe for protecting the fortress against the Russian commander Vyshnevetsky and Zhane warriors .

In July 1560, Vishnevetsky launched another attack on Azak but was stopped by the Bey of Caffa. Russian and Zhane forces then attempted to cross the Strait of Taman to attack Caffa. Ottoman authorities, who learned of the plans through either Russian messengers or spies of the Crimean Khan, stationed a second fleet in the strait and blocked the attack.

In early 1561, the French ambassador reported that the successful operations by the Russians and Circassians were threatening Caffa.

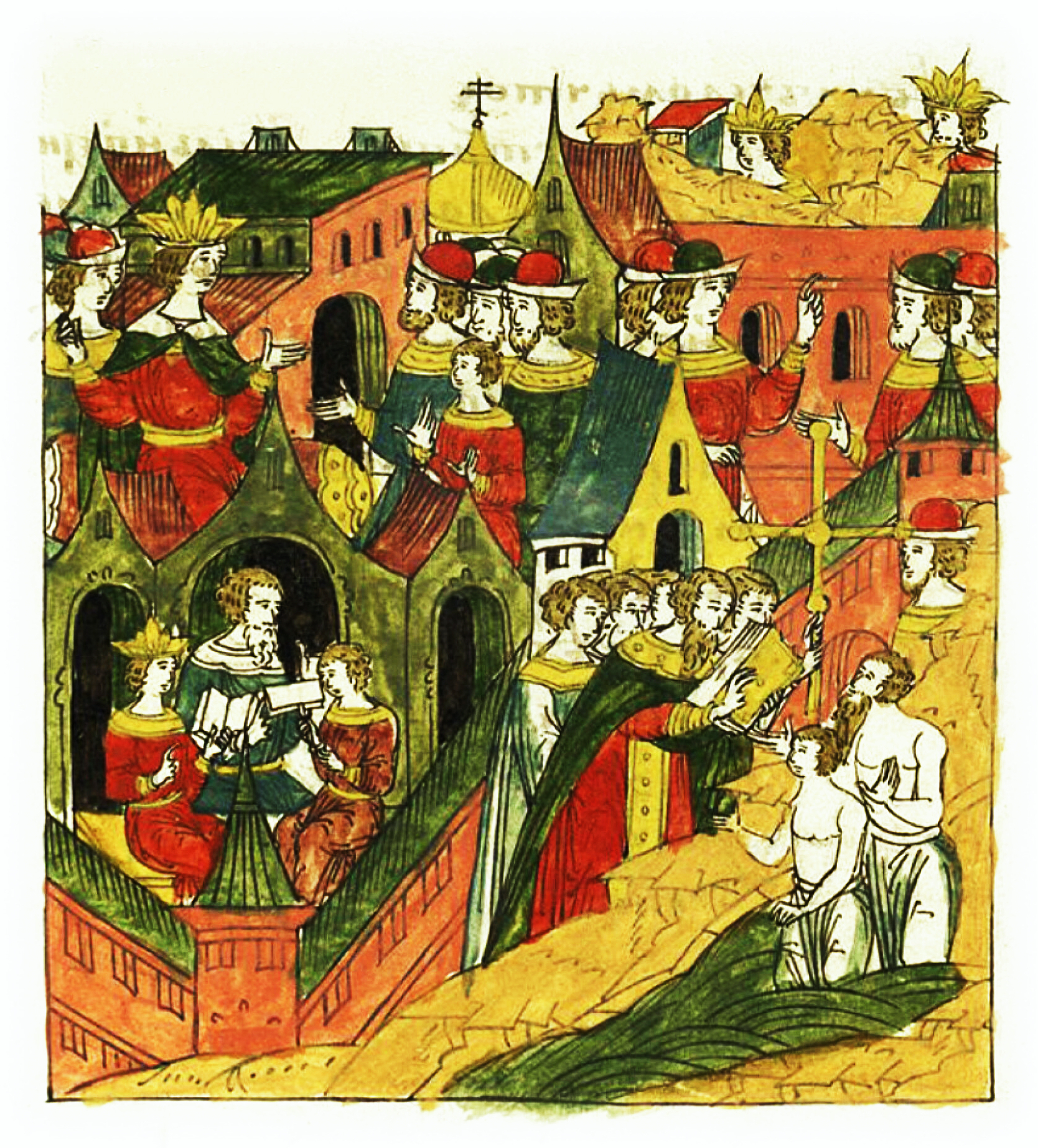
Baptism of princes Tutaryk and Qudenet in Moscow, receiving the names Ivan and Alexander.

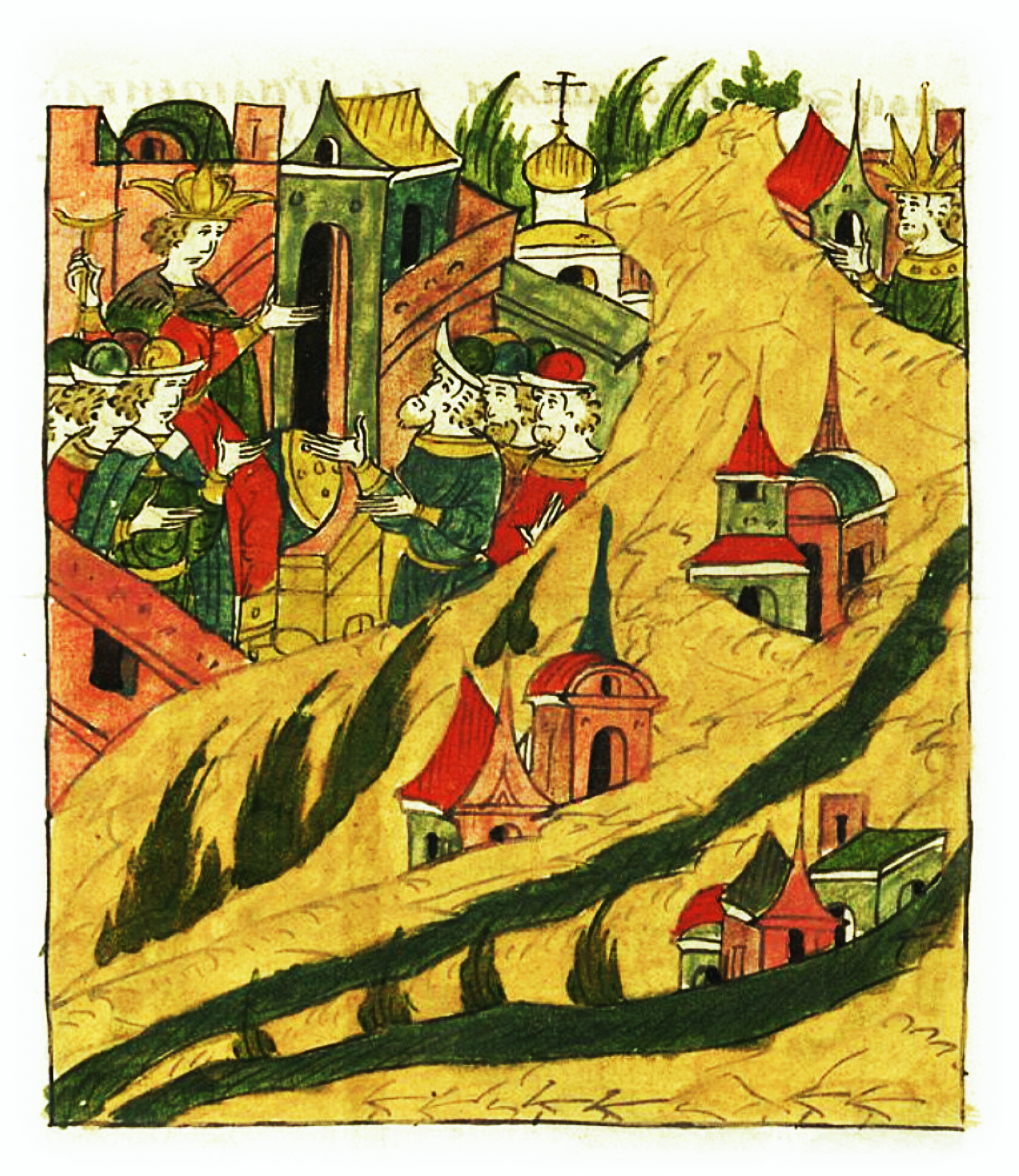
Fedor Zagryazhsky reporting to Ivan IV on the capture of Islam-Kermen, Temryuk, and Taman.

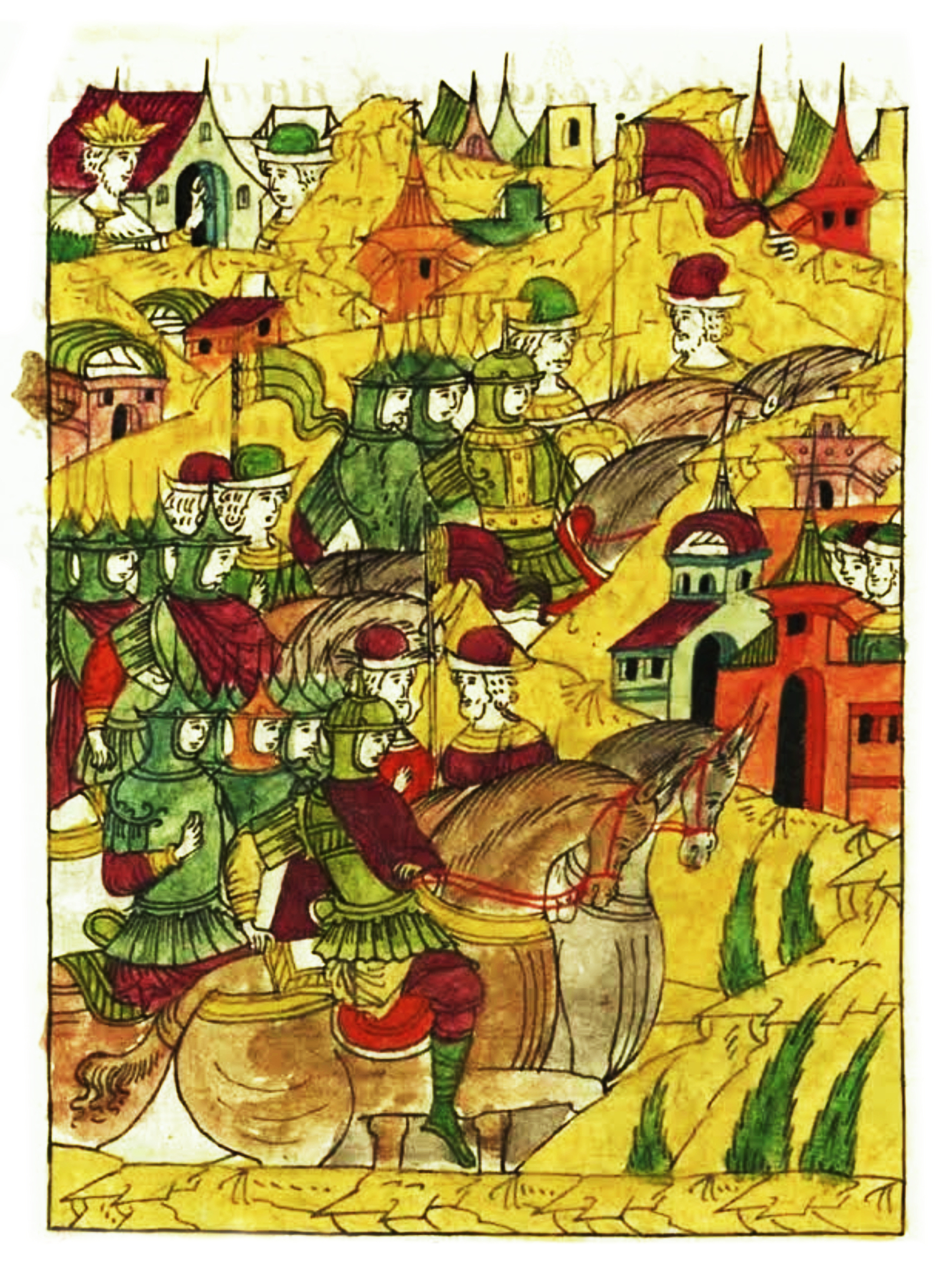
Combined Russian and Circassian forces marching to Ryngol Castle, with Circassians as vanguards.

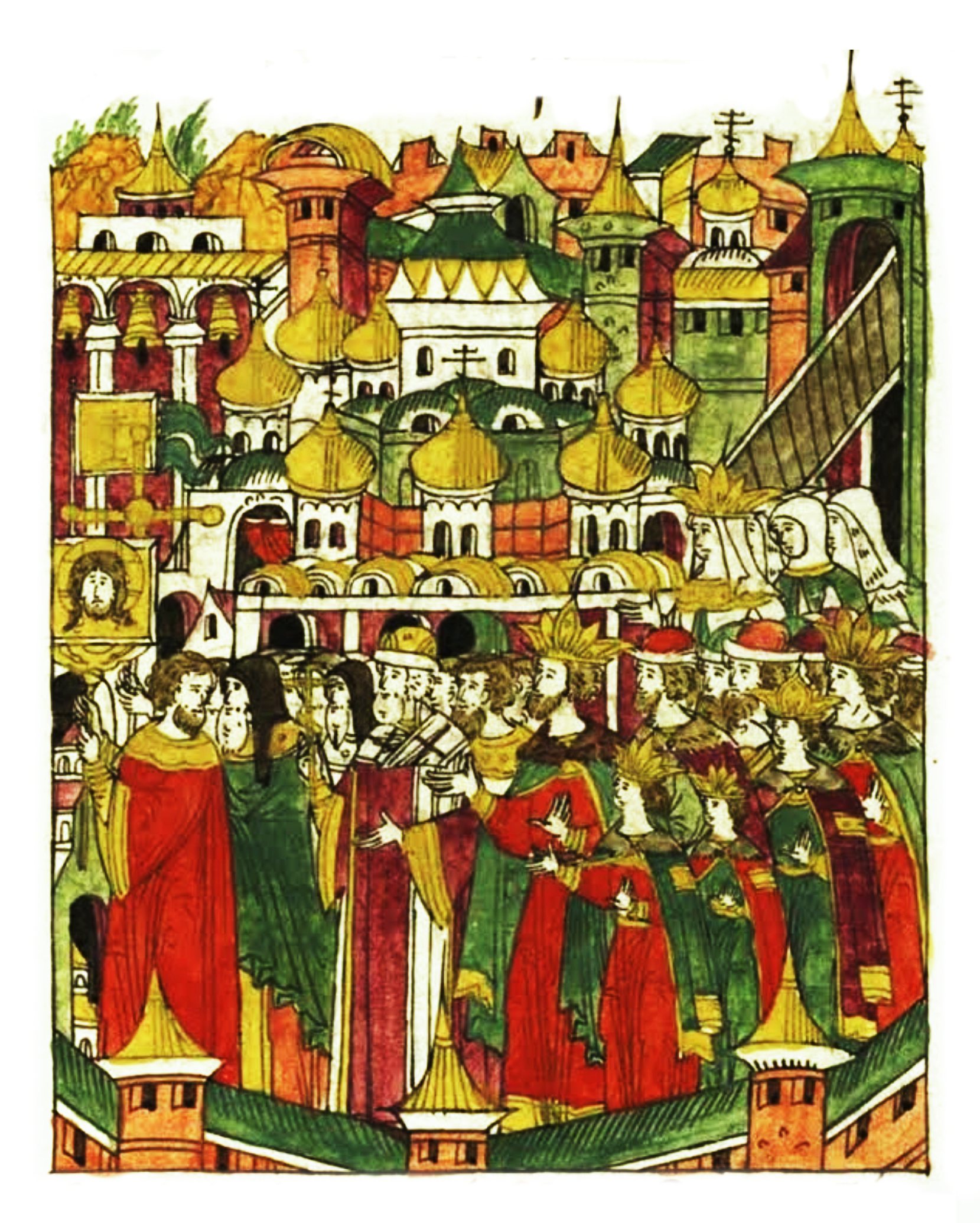
Arrival of Vishnevetsky and prince Ichyuruk in Moscow to request baptism and Russian voivodes.

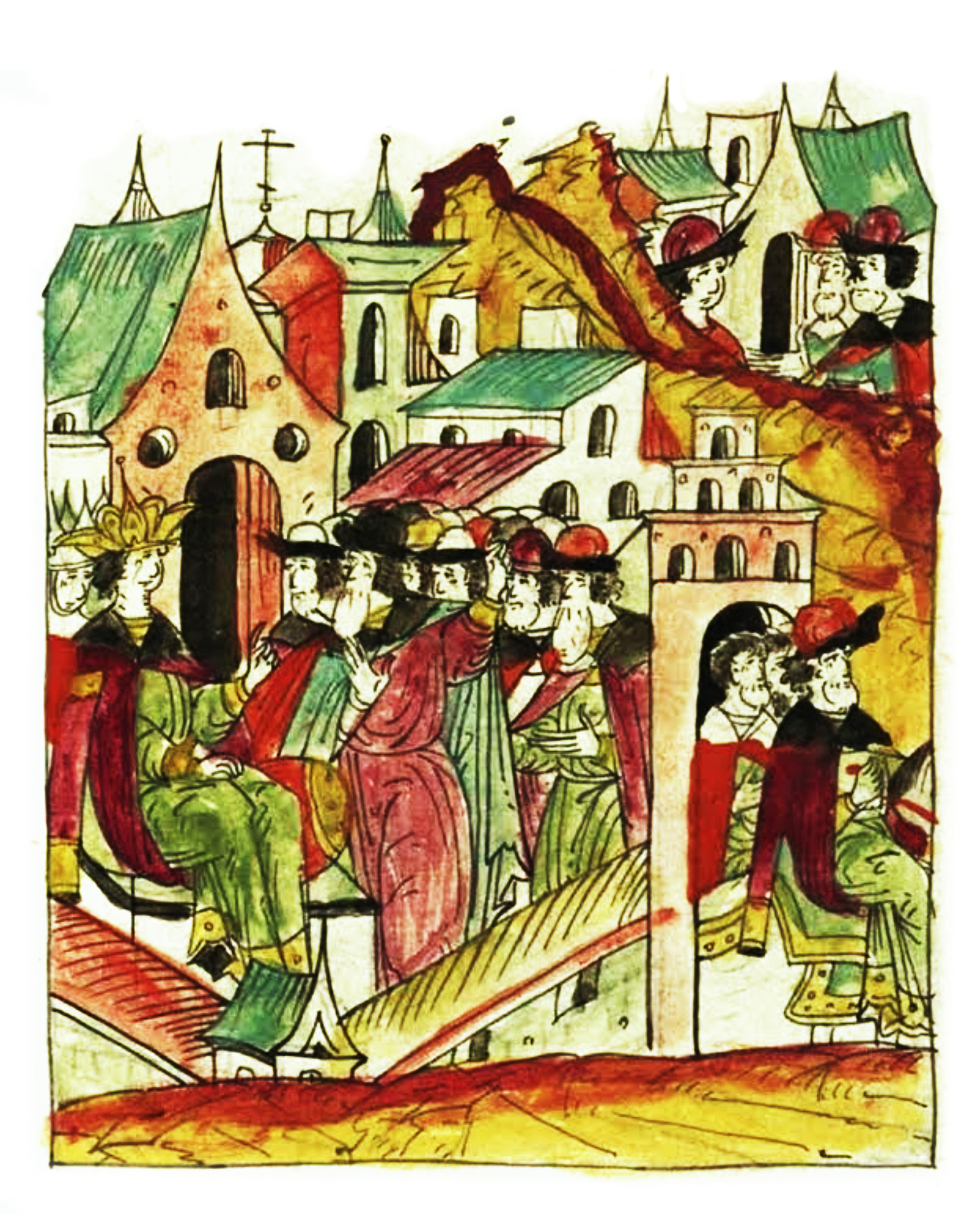
Ivan IV dispatching Vishnevetsky alongside princes Sibequ and Makhoshoqo to Circassia.

==== Decline of Russian relations ====
Before marrying Maria Temryukovna, Ivan IV sought a bride from Zhane. In August 1560 and February 1561, the Tsar sent envoys Fedor Voksherin and Boris Sukin to the Zhane region to look at the princesses. While there is no document on whether Sibequ gave his daughter to the Tsar, Zhane-Russian relations started to weaken after this period.

On April 2 1561, the Crimean Khan sent a letter stating that Davud and Mehmed, the two sons of the "bey of Zhane," arrived to declare their allegiance to the Ottoman Empire. The sultan ordered a daily salary of 15 akches for each of them after their request for financial support.

With Vishnevetsky's departure from Russian service to Poland in 1561, this period of close military cooperation between the Zhane and Moscow began to weaken. In August 1561, Polish King Sigismund II Augustus published a manifesto inviting Circassian princes, known as Petyhorcy, to enter Polish royal service. Military leader Vishnevetsky initiated the process to secure a royal pardon for himself and bring his Circassian relatives into Polish service. Kutusz-murza, an envoy of Crimean Khan Devlet Giray, mediated the invitation due to a Polish-Lithuanian military alliance against Russia. The manifesto guaranteed that the arriving Circassians would receive land and salaries matching their status, along with full freedom to leave the service. Sibequ's brother Dawid Kansankowicz Petyhorzec entered the Polish-Lithuanian Commonwealth following the manifesto. Russian intelligence confirmed his presence by September 1563.

In 1562, official peace negotiations were made between the Tsardom of Russia and the Ottoman Empire. Ottoman administrative records show that the Zhane were in a state of "rebellion against them" and continued to create a military threat against the Azak Fortress. However, because of Ivan IV sought peace with the Crimean Khanate due to his war against Polish-Lithuanian Commonwealth, the military support that the western Circassian princes received from Moscow was cut off.

Sibequ realized that Russia wasn't protecting Zhane and Besleney principalities against Ottoman-Crimean pressure. Russian authorities had promised support to the Zhane. However, Russia prioritized the Kabardia region and the Daryal Gorge. Russia restricted its support for the Zhane to avoid direct conflict with the Ottoman Empire. Temruqo Yidar, the father-in-law of the Tsar, faced political isolation within Circassia due to his continuous loyalty to Russia and actions that violated Adyghe Khabze norms. By the end of 1562, the Kabardians under Pshiapshoqo Qeytuqo, Gazi the ruler of the Lesser Nogai Horde, and various Circassian principalities including the Zhane, Hatuqay, Bzhedug, and Besleney allied against Temruqo. This political alignment was supported by marriages between dynasties. Due to these pressures, Temruqo sought refuge in Astrakhan. The Tsar dispatched a unit of 500 musketeers and 500 Cossacks under the command of G. S. Pleshcheev to support his ally. During this campaign, Temruqo marched against and defeated his main rival in Kabardia, Pshiapshoqo Qeytuqo. Sibequ and Besleney princes became atalyks to two sons of Crimean Khan, with Sibequ taking Safa Giray.

On February 15, 1563, the Russian army captured the Polotsk fortress during the Livonian War. This event led Tsar Ivan IV to alter his foreign policy priorities. In March 1563, the Tsar sent his ambassador Afanasy Nagoy to the Crimean Khanate to propose a renewal of peace to focus military resources on the West and pause the conflict with Crimea. Sibequ and Besleney princes had formed their alliance with Russia specifically for military cooperation against the Crimean Khanate and the Ottomans. Ivan IV's peace negotiations with Crimea on terms of friendship dissolved the basis of the 1555 military agreements with Sibequ. Sibequ concluded that Russia's alignment with Crimea left his principality vulnerable to Crimean attacks. At the same time, centralizing power and increased pressure on the aristocracy at the Russian court caused fear of political reprisal among Sibequ and his allies.

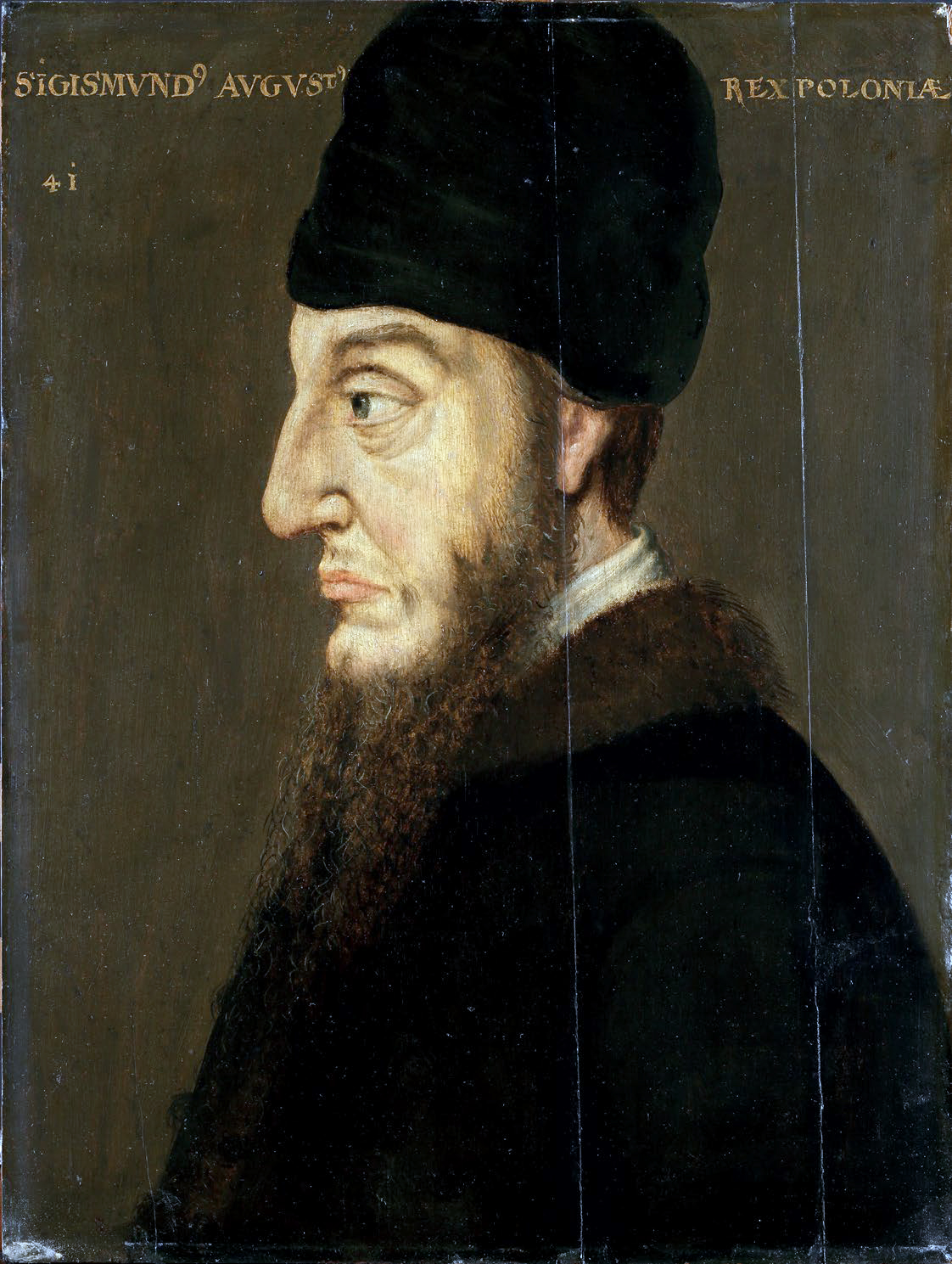
Sigismund II Augustus in 1561

In the early 1563, Sibequ ordered his son Alexander (Qudenet) to depart Russia for the court of King Sigismund II Augustus. Alexander went to Polish-Lithuanian Commonwealth with 300 noblemen and other Circassian princes; 2 from Zhane and the other 2 from Hytuk. This caused a scandal and a classification of treason at the Russian court. They entered the official military service of Sigismund II and received various estates. Their vassal noblemen earned the estate szlachta. These princes were officially recognized under the highest aristocratic class as kniaź (prince). King Sigismund II had explicitly addressed them as Circassian princes in his 1561 manifesto which sseperated their high noble status from lower titles like murza. The royal chancery used the specific title Kniaź Petyhorski for them. These princes were:

- Alexander Vasilievich Cherkassky (Adyghe: Зан Сибэкъу икъо Къудэнет; Polish: Aleksander (Oleszko) Sibokowicz Petyhorski), son of Sibequ.
- Gavrila Kanbulatovich (Polish: Hawryło (Gawriła) Kambułatowicz Petyhorski), estimated to be a nephew of Sibequ. During the 1563 Polotsk campaign, he had served as a yesaul in the Russian army. He held high protocol positions in the Boyar Duma in Moscow and participated as an guest of honor during the reception of Lithuanian ambassadors in 1562. He was granted the estates including Jelnia, Kuplin, Bajki, and Szyłowicze due to his military service. He died without children around June 1620, and his estates transferred to Jarosz Wereszczaka.
- Kasim Kanbulatovich (Adyghe: Къанболэт икъо Къасым; Polish: Kassim Kambułatowicz Petyhorski), He served in the Lithuanian army and acquired the Rakoszyce estate in the Minsk region. Unlike the other princes, he remained a Muslim. He died before 1592. In 1592, his son Achmeć Kambułatowicz inherited the Rakoszyce estate. Achmeć married Zofia Szejchówna Bahryńska from the Bahryński family, a Tatar family in Lithuania.
- Saltanuko Zhumkovich (Adyghe: Шамэкъо СултIаныкъо), a prince from the Shameqo princely family of Hytuk. He settled permanently in Poland and obtained Polish nobility status. He commanded light cavalry regiments in the Polish army known as the Pyatigorsk Cossacks.
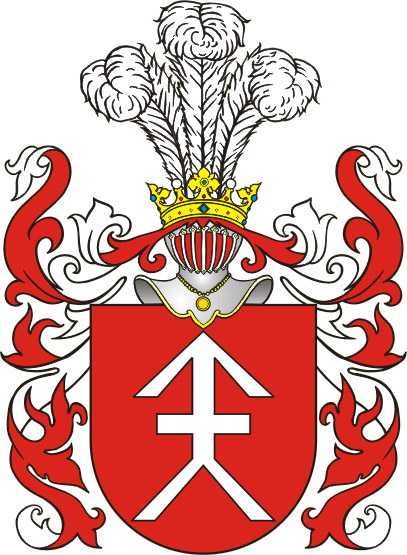
- The Kościesza coat of arms, used by nearly 300 families in Polish–Lithuanian Commonwealth.
  Temryuko Zhumkovich (Adyghe: Шамэкъо Темрыкъо; Polish: Temruk Szymkowicz Petyhorski), the brother of Saltanuko. He served as an obrona potoczna cavalryman between 1563 and 1574. He led the Pyatigorsk Cossacks unit. On April 13, 1572, during a battle against the Ottomans in Moldavia, Temruk remained on the battlefield with his Pyatigorsk regiment while most Polish units fled and the regiment resisted until other forces reorganized. He participated in the campaigns of Moldavia in 1572, Danzig between 1576 and 1577, and Stefan Batory's Moscow campaigns between 1579 and 1581. He also took part in the Piorun cavalry raids in 1581. He received lands in the Samogitia region and obtained a Polish nobility title in 1601. His son, Mikołaj-Michał Szymkowicz Temruk, served as a rotmistrz. Temruk used the Kościesza coat of arms. Before his nobility approval, Temruk used a star and crescent symbol on his seal. Later, he was adopted by the Szymkowicz family of Russian origin and began using their Kościesza coat of arms. Some researchers argued that Temruk was the ancestor of a family using the Leliwa coat of arms. However, according to historian Hieronim Grala, the Leliwa usage lacks proof and is an unverified assumption, making the Kościesza coat of arms the reliable data.

The Zhane princes and their 300 cavalrymen formed the basis of a specific light-to-medium cavalry class in the Polish army known as the Petyhorcy. These units filled the gap between the heavily armored Winged Hussars and light scouting forces. Their combat style relied on Circassian-style light armor, shields, spears, and high maneuverability. This military tradition and its tactics persisted within elite units until the dissolution of the Polish-Lithuanian Commonwealth in 1795. In sixteenth-century Russian chronicles, Circassian groups from the Caucasus were frequently designated under the general term Pyatigorskiye Cherkasy. Since the Zhane princes arrived in Moscow alongside Kabardian princes or through similar diplomatic channels, external sources used such terminological generalizations. The term "Petyhorski" was used instead of "Czerkaski" in the Polish-Lithuanian Commonwealth to avoid confusion. In Polish, "Czerkaski" referred to the town of Cherkasy on the Dnieper River rather than the Caucasus. Therefore, old Polish terminology named all Circassians as "Petyhorcy." When Circassian nobles entered Polish service, their surnames were changed to "Petyhorski" as a translation of their identity. This name later became an official military rank and title in the Commonwealth army.

Sibequ's successors in Moscow used the surname "Анчоковы" (Anchokov's) in 17th-century records. This name corresponds to the Adyghe name "Анцокъу," (Anchoq) which could indicate that they came from a branch of the Zhane princes named Anchoq. Temruk Szymkowicz signed his name as "Temruk Onychow Szymkowicz" on a personal receipt from 1575. According to Hieronim Grala, the "Onychow" form is a corrupted version of the "Anchokov," rather than a derivative of the Christian name Anisim.

In 1563, to oppose Temruqo who had Russian support, Sibequ and the prince of Besleney sent an envoy to Crimean Khan Devlet Giray to request a Crimean prince, Islam Giray, to rule them. This envoy was Sibequ's brother, "Chuyuk," "Chuyuguk" or "Chyubuk". Later, Sibequ's son Alexander and his relatives stayed in Lithuania with another brother of Sibequ, before showing their intention to move to Crimea.

In March 1563, Russian diplomat, as the ambassador to Crimea, Afanasy Nagoy received orders to query Crimean authorities regarding whether Sibequ and the Besleney prince had started war against Moscow's ally, Temruqo. Nagoy investigated the location of Sibequ's son Alexander and reported that Sigismund II blocked him traveling from Lithuania to Crimea. Alexander and Gavrila stayed in Lithuania with "Sibok's brother," whom Hieronim Grala identifies as Dawid Kansankowicz. He also collected intelligence on Circassian nobles in the Crimean court, including their numbers and salaries. Nagoy reported that the Zhane and Besleney princes had abandoned their alliance with Moscow in favor of Crimea and Poland.

In July 1563, Russian ambassador Aleksey Klobukov went to Sigismund II to meet with Alexander and the other princes. Alexander and the other Zhane princes rejected the proposals, refused to return to Russia, and chose to remain in Poland. Polish-Lithuanian records has no evidence of Alexander's activities in those territories and it's been indicated that he didn't stay in Poland for a long time and returned to Moscow, influenced by the offers from Russian agents. In the spring of 1573, during the battles in Livonia, he changed sides again and joined the Swedish forces.

Sibequ soon entered the service of the Crimean Khan. There is no record of Sibequ converting to Islam when he joined this service. He likely served the Crimean Khan as an Orthodox Christian for a period.

==== Re-integration into the Ottoman sphere ====
In 1563, Crimean Khan Devlet I Giray appointed his son, Safa Giray, as the administrative official (idarı amir) over the Zhane following the request. This appointment established an official and administrative connection between the Zhane and the Crimean Khanate, which integrated the principality into the administrative hierarchy of the khanate.

In 1563, Sibequ reported to the Khan that Russia intended to build or had started constructing a fortress in Kabardia to establish a presence through its ally, Temruqo. After the report of Sibequ, Kulgun Mirza, reported that a Russian voivode arrived with 1,000 streltsy to assist Temruqo and build a fortified city for him. While official Russian records state that the first fortress in Kabardia was built in 1567 at Temruqo's request, Sibequ's 1563 report shows that fortification efforts began earlier. These structures were called ghost fortresses because they were dismantled under Ottoman and Crimean pressure, only to be rebuilt by Russian forces later.

In the middle of the 16th century, some members of the Zhane aristocracy had been integrated into the Ottoman imperial hierarchy. Administrative records from the 1560s show that Çerkes Kasım Pasha, who was a member of the Zhane elite class, held the high-ranking post of Sanjak-bey of Caffa. During this period, Çerkes Kasım Pasha led the canal project intended to connect the Don and Volga rivers and commanded the related military operations.

In 1564, the Zhane principality was organized under Ottoman administration as the Zhane Sanjak, with Prince Mustafa Bey as its leader, while his relative Besleney prince Akhmet (also known as Aspat / АспIатI in Adyghe) had influence. In 1565, Mustafa Bey appealed to the Ottoman Empire against the kidnapping and enslavement of his Zhane subjects by non-Muslim Circassians in 1564. Upon Mustafa Bey's petition, the Ottoman sultan sent an order to the Governor of Caffa, stating that the Zhane were now Ottoman subjects, banning slave traders from buying them, and ordering the immediate release of those who were enslaved.

In 1565, reports sent by the Beylerbey of Caffa confirm that the Zhane maintained its independent military operations in the region. As hostilities with Temruqo increased, Sibequ and the Besleney prince requested direct military aid from Crimean Khan Devlet-Girey in 1565. In September 1565, Crimean-aligned Western Circassian forces, supported by Sibequ, engaged Russian troops commanded by Ivan Dashkov and Matvey Rzhevsky.

Dawid Kansankowicz Petyhorzec completed his military service for the Polish-Lithuanian Commonwealth and chose to return to his homeland in 1567. He traveled with property earned from King Sigismund II along with captives and spoils he captured during the Livonian War. Near Vinnytsia, a local official and residents attacked and robbed him of all his goods and servants. On March 12, 1567, King Sigismund II sent a letter to Prince Roman Sanguszko regarding the attack against Dawid Kansankowicz, requesting the return and protection of Dawid's property.

Çerkes Kasım Pasha commanded the Don-Volga-Astrakhan campaign of 1569, which relied on military support and supplies from Crimea and Circassia. Prior to the campaign, the Circassians, Nogais, and Kazan Tatars sent messages and promises confirming that they would assist the Ottoman army. While the Ottoman Sultan issued decrees for Zhane leaders and others to join the forces from Caffa, Moldavia, and Wallachia, the mobilization failed. Seven Circassian rulers, including bey of "Cana" (Zhane) Mustafa, bey of "Takuşe" Bahadır, bey of "Hali" Mustafa, three unnamed princes, and the ruler of Terek, did not join the campaign.

In 1570, the Crimean khan requested an imperial decree from Istanbul addressed to the Zhane leaders, who had ignored his commands to release captured Nogai prisoners. Russia's ally Temruqo died of wounds he took during the Battle of Afips in 1570, which led the Russian influence in the region to decrease.

The Ottomans imposed taxes on the Taman Circassians including a part of the Zhane, including jizya (tax on non-Muslims), ashar, and resm-i çift (land tax). Circassian leaders and the population frequently petitioned the Governor of Caffa, stating they couldn't pay those taxes, but the petitions had no effect. The taxation and central authority pressure led some Circassian groups abandoned their villages and relocated to mountainous areas of the principality that was beyond Ottoman or Crimean control. Ottoman documents from 1570 and 1571 issued orders to return this population to their settlements in Taman. Some Zhane groups retried to sought an alliance with Russia in response, which intensified the rivalry between the Ottoman Empire and Russia in the region.

In June 1571, Mustafa Bey traveled to Istanbul to meet Selim II. He requested permission for his subjects to resettle in the Taman region. The Ottoman administration granted Mustafa Bey and his brothers the right to settle and acquire property. An official decree dated June 18, 1571 was addressed to the Beylerbeyi of Kefe and the Kadi of Taman regarding the relocation of approximately 40 households to the Taman Plain. The document instructed local administrators to protect these new settlers from any interference or harm, provided they paid their legal taxes in accordance with Islamic law and the state registration registers, while requiring any attacks against them to be reported directly to Istanbul.

This action was part of an Ottoman policy to reduce the influence of the Crimean Khan by connecting local leaders directly to the central government. Ottomans didn't send a copy of this order to Crimea. The administration would previously send the order to the Crimean khan to enforce implementation. The affairs of the Zhane were instead managed directly in Istanbul through Ottoman agents operating in the region.

==== Late 16th-century ====
In 1577, following the raiding and enslavement of the population living under the Zhane leader named Akhmet, Mehmed II Giray sent a letter to Istanbul. In the document, Mehmed Giray stated that this population should be treated similarly to the protected subjects (rayah) of the Ottoman Empire and the raids against them were unlawful under Islamic law.

In 1578, the Ottoman administration paid 1,206,274 akçe from the revenue of Caffa to Circassian rulers. This amount rose to 1,918,480 akçe in 1579. Some of these Circassian rulers also received revenues from other parts of the empire. One Zhane prince received a timar from the revenue of Aleppo. Previously, in 1565, this same prince had rebelled and made an alliance with the Zaporozhian Cossacks led by Dmytro Vyshnevetskyi.

At the beginning of the Ottoman–Safavid War (1578–1590), the Crimean Khan Mehmed II Giray sought Circassian participation in the 1578 campaign to capture Derbent. Following the advice of his Besleney advisor and nobleman Tutcheriy Medjadjuqo, the Khan challenged Circassians and asked which warriors dared to take the fortress. In response, the Zhane joined the campaign alongside the Kheghache, Hatuqay, Chemguy, and Besleney principalities, then received a banner with Arabic inscriptions from the Khan. The expedition resulted in high casualties and significant loots, and the war was documented in the folk song "Song of the Capture of Temirqape (Derbent)" (Note: Also known as the Temirqape War (Темыркъапэ зау), Song of Temirqape (Темыркъапэ иорэд) and Ghurtat War (Гъуртат зау).) in which mention of noble families was considered a source of prestige.

In 1584, the sons of the late Khan Mehmed II Giray fled Crimea, with Saadet Giray receiving support from the Nogais. In 1585, the Ottoman government ordered the Zhane leader in the Taman region to support the Ottoman-backed Khan İslâm II Giray, because some Circassian warriors had joined Saadet Giray. The fugitive princes attacked the khanate with Nogai support before being defeated at Caffa by Ottoman forces. Following these events, in 1586, Safa Giray moved into Circassia, first to Kabardia and subsequently to Zhane. Safa Giray had an atalyk relation with the Zhane. Based on his 1563 administrative role and his atalyk connection, the Zhane supported Safa Giray's claim as a candidate for the Crimean throne and granted him political protection.

In the early 1587, an Ottoman merchant ship carrying soldiers, merchants, goods, and slaves ran aground on the Zhane coast. The Zhane prince, who held an Ottoman title and was an Ottoman subject, seized the 150 Muslims and 548 slaves on board, claiming the passengers and cargo as his own property. The Ottoman administration responded by ordering the prince, Akhmet (recorded as "Çıkoko" in another document), to return the people and goods. They avoided a military attack at the first because the prince was considered an Ottoman ally, but they officially labeled his actions as a failure of duty. The Ottoman government also ordered the Crimean Khan to investigate how a ruler operating under an Ottoman mandate could commit such an act and directed him to recover the captives. The Ottoman administration responded by ordering Akhmet to return the people and goods. They initially avoided a military attack because Akhmet (Chiqoqo) was considered an Ottoman ally, but they officially labeled his actions as a failure of duty. The Ottoman government also ordered the Crimean Khan to investigate how a ruler operating under an Ottoman mandate could commit such an act and directed him to recover the captives.

In the first half of 1587, an Ottoman merchant ship commanded by Seydi Reis, which was carrying soldiers, merchants, goods, and slaves from Sukhumi, ran aground on the Zhane coast at a location referred to as the "large harbor" (büyük liman). The Governor of the Zhane Sanjak-bey, Prince Ahmed (recorded as "Çıkoko" in another document), who held an Ottoman title and was an Ottoman subject, seized the cargo, alongside the 150 Muslims and 548 slaves on board, claiming the passengers and cargo as his own property. The Ottoman administration responded by ordering the Beylerbeyi of Caffa to recover all the seized property and captives from the prince, who was commanded to return the people and goods.

In mid-1587, the Zhane was in a state of rebellion against the Ottomans. The Crimean Khan sent a report to the Ottoman court stating that the conflict was resolved and the population was brought back under compliance. The report also addressed administrative matters, noting that a local currency (kara akçe) valued at four per one Ottoman akçe had been minted under legal decrees, and dismissed reports that Mubarak Giray and Selamet Giray had collected unauthorized fines. Due to geographic distance, the central Ottoman administration relied on the Governor of Caffa to track political developments in the Caucasus. Because Istanbul lacked detailed intelligence on local borders and alliances, the governor was regularly commanded to verify the allegiance of Circassian leaders. Before official decrees were sent to these leaders at the request of the Crimean Khan, the Governor of Caffa had to investigate and confirm their compliance.

During the Ottoman–Safavid War (1578–1590), the North Caucasus served as a supply route for Ottoman forces. An Ottoman decree dated 1581 commands the safe passage of miners through dangerous territories on their way to a silver mine in Shirvan via Derbent. Copies of this order were sent to several regional leaders, the rulers of Zhane, Chemguy, Kabardia, Besleney, "Karayutak" and the Shamkhal of Kumyk. In 1583, the Zhane leaders Akhmet and Davud escorted the imperial treasury and military units from Istanbul to the Ottoman army in Derbent. For this service, the Ottoman administration awarded them khilats (robes of honor). The Ottomans also placed these leaders on a salary and granted their territories sanjak status to consolidate the Ottoman presence in the region. Later, in 1586, Zhane leader Mehmet Bey was directly tasked with ensuring the safe transport of the Ottoman military treasury to Derbent.

In 1590, Don Cossacks raided along the Kuban River near the Sea of Azov and captured three princes named "Tyterk," "Pszimoftyk," and "Sałtan." These princes were close relatives of Temruk Szymkowicz. The prisoners were kept in heavy chains by the Cossacks, who wanted ransom to free them.

In the spring of 1592, Polish courier Marcin Suszski was sent to Moscow for freeing these princes. Suszski delivered a royal letter from King Sigismund III Vasa to Tsar Fyodor I Ivanovich. The king took the issue seriously because the prisoners were close relatives of Temruk Siemienowicz, who was a royal noble and cavalry captain in Polish service. King Sigismund III asked the Tsar to find the princes and free them without any payment as a matter of state honor. Lithuanian Chancellor Lew Sapieha also helped by sending a letter to Boris Godunov, asking him to use his authority to free the captives. Sapieha offered to support Godunov’s personal interests at the Polish court in return. Tsar Feodor answered that the Don Cossacks acted without orders, calling them thieves who escaped the state and broke the peace.

An Ottoman decree from 1592 to 1593 addresses the Zhane rulers, Ahmed Bey and Musa Bey, regarding regional security. An Ottoman official Hüsrev, who was a Chemguy prince in origin, was appointed to investigate bandit groups in Caffa and Taman. The Zhane leadership was ordered to detain any bandits fleeing into their territory and hand them over to Mehmed Çavuş for investigation. The decree states that cooperation would be in their favor, while negligence would result in punishment.

In the 16th century, the Zhane principality was considered the most powerful and dominant political entity in Western Circassia. By the first half of the 16th century, the Zhane had a centralized authority ruled by their own "Grand Prince".

=== 17th Century ===
The Shapsugs and Natukhajs originated as a community of five clans in the Psezuape River valley, south of Zhane territory. Zhane principality was controlling the region from the Taman Peninsula to Tuapse, while the Shapsug-Natukhaj communities remained in the inland mountains. In the 17th and early 18th centuries, internal divisions among the Zhane feudal elite weakened the principality's authority. Demographic growth in the mountain communities led the Shapsugs and Natukhajs to break away from Zhane control and form princeless societies while expanding into lowlands formerly held by the Zhane, Kheghache, and Hatuqay principalities.

According to local oral traditions, by the first half of the 17th century, the Zhane inhabited the lower basin of the Psekups River, bordered by nomadic steppe groups to the north, Abazins to the east, Shapsugs and Natukhajs to the west, and Circassian fugitives in the southern mountain passes. During this period, the Cherchenay, a subgroup of the Bzhedug, were forced by the Abzakh pressure northward out of the upper Psekups basin and across the Chigiyako Stream, pushing the Zhane toward the Kuban and Belaya rivers. Following further Abzakh pressures and wars around 1631, the main Bzhedug population also advanced toward the Kuban River, which affected the Zhane territory. A portion of the Zhane merged with the Bzhedug, while another group moved to Karakuban. The lower reaches of the Pshish and Psekups rivers, extending from the Afips River and previously inhabited by the Zhane, passed under Bzhedug control.

Zhane people adopted Islam widely beginning in the 17th century. It is linked to the high status of their leadership within the Crimean Khanate. Princes who converted to Islam would usually change their original Circassian names to Muslim names.

In August 1616, Terki Voivode P. F. Priklonskiy reported to Moscow on a planned military campaign by the Crimean Khan through the North Caucasus against Safavid Iran. According to intelligence from Andrey Afanasyev, the Khan's army included Zhane Circassians alongside Nogais, Abazins, "Khuntuns," and the Kabardian factions of Qaziy and Sholokh. Leaders of the forces including Kumyk Prince Saltan-Mahmut and Kabardian Prince Alejuqo Shojenuqo, met the Khan upon his arrival in the region. Shah Abbas deployed forces to the Sunzha River crossings to counter the movement. However, the campaign stalled without major military engagement due to severe famine in the Kuban region.

Following the killing of Kabardian prince Qaziy Pshiapshoqo by the Nogais in 1615, Kabardian prince Alejuqo Shojenuqo requested Russian military assistance in May 1619 to counter the Nogais. Alejuqo reported to Russian authorities in Terki that a coalition was ready to act against the Nogais. This coalition included the Zhane alongside the Besleney, Chemguy, Kumyks and the Vainakh communities of Merezins and Shibuts. Before these forces assembled, Alejuqo fought against Kumyks in July and was defeated.

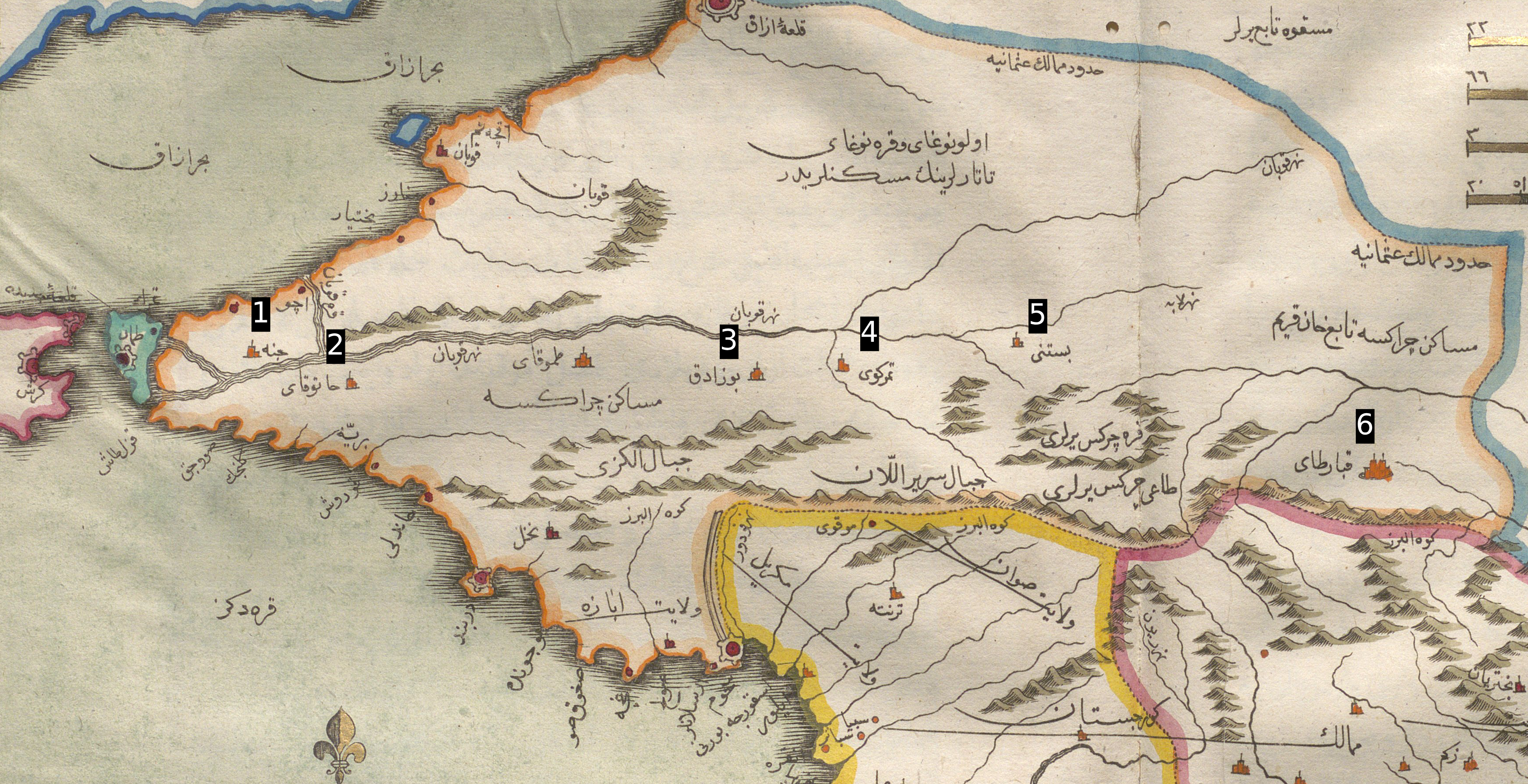
Kâtip Çelebi's Cihannümâ showing a map of the Circassian principalities in 1648. Zhane is labeled as "1" and written as Cannah (Ottoman Turkish: جنة).

Italian Dominican missionary Giovanni da Lucca visited Circassia between 1625 and 1629. He noted in 1625 that the coastal settlements of the Zhane Principality were ruled by two brother princes, "Casibei" (Qaziy) and "Sancascobei" (Zaneqoshkho). They were ruling the seashore from Varad Mountains in north to Cudescio (Kodesh or Tuapse) in south, which is roughly 300 miles and had many coastal settlements. Lucca's 1629 notes also mention that the Zhane lands, located a two-day journey from Temryuk, were under the rule of a leader named "Djan-ko-bey" (Zhaneqo).

In his 1634 report, Emiddio Dortelli d’Ascoli documented a former Circassian political practice. When a Circassian prince faced defeat against another, he would request military help from the Crimean Khan in exchange for 200 or 300 slaves. Upon the Khan's arrival, the opposing prince would negotiate and also agree to offer slaves. The Khan would then take slaves from both sides and mediate a peace agreement. Dortelli d’Ascoli noted that by 1634, many years had passed since Circassians stopped doing this practice after realising its consequences. This social change reduced the Crimean Khanate's supply of slaves from the region.

==== Zhane Civil War and Crimean-Zhane War in mid-17th century ====
===== Crimean records =====
According to the Çelebi Akay Tarihi (History of Chelebi Akay), an 18th-century Crimean chronicle written by Abdurrahman Effendi, further details the conflict and the actions of Hakushmuq (Adyghe: ХьэкушIмыкъу) ("Hakshumak" in Ottoman sources), who is named in this text as the "Akçomak", which is a Turkified version of his name; "ak" meaning white, "çomak" meaning a short stick with a thick end. Abdurrahman Effendi based these accounts on Seyyid Mehmed Rıza's work, Es-Seb‘ü’s-Seyyâr, simplified the text and added his own observations. The chronicle describes Hakushmuq as obstinate (muânnid), rebellious (âsî), and a liar (âfik), highlights his actions against the Crimean khans. Hakushmuq claimed fully independent authority to establish the main power of Zhane and did not recognize the Crimean rulers.

Between 1635 and 1637, during the reign of Inayet Giray, Zhane prince Hakushmuq refused to obey the Crimean Khanate and didn't send the slaves and tribute. Pehlivan Husam Giray, who was a Kalgay, was sent to collect the traditional tax called kudümiyye, a type of captive tax and tribute. After Husam Giray entered Zhane territory, Hakushmuq's men stole horses from the Crimean army. Husam Giray organized a surprise attack on the Zhane through Taman and returned to Crimea with a large number of captives.

Between 1637 and 1641, during the reign of Bahadır Giray, Hakushmuq remained sovereign and increased his claims of independence. He declared that he did not recognize the Crimean khans and claimed the status of a sovereign ruler. The Khan's brother, Islam Giray Sultan, led a new campaign against Hakushmuq but could not break through the Zhane defenses in battle and were forced to retreat.

After Islam Giray III became the Crimean Khan in 1644, he organized a campaign. The Crimean forces feigned a campaign toward a different direction and launched a sudden attack against the Zhane through Taman. The Zhane were defeated and Hakushmuq was killed along his supporters. Crimean forces took a large number of captives, whom the text describes as "sugar-lipped girls", "silver-skinned boys," and "four-eyebrowed young servants".

===== Ottoman records =====
In other documents, the regional influence rivalry between the Crimean Khanate and the Ottoman Empire affected dynastic relations within the Zhane principality. During his reign between 1637 and 1641, the Crimean Khan Bahadır I Giray placed his son under the care of the Zhane prince Antonuq to be educated through the traditional atalyk (fosterage) system. This arrangement increased the political influence and prestige of Antonuq throughout Circassia. Antonuq's brother Hakushmuq feared that this situation would give Antonuq absolute authority. Between the years 1638 and 1644, Hakushmuq launched a military attack against Antonuq, defeating him and plundering his properties. Hakushmuq fled from the Crimean troops sent by Bahadır Giray and took refuge in the Ottoman-controlled Azak Fortress under the protection of Governor Siyavush Pasha. The Ottoman court granted legitimacy to Hakushmuq by sending him a decree renewing the "Circassian administration" authority previously given to him during the reign of Sultan Ahmed I.

Islam III Giray took the Crimean throne in 1644. Islam Giray ignored the decisions of the Ottoman authorities supporting Hakushmuq and launched a large-scale military campaign against him. The Crimean army entered Circassian territory by crossing the Kerch Strait, which was frozen during the winter season. As a result, Hakushmuq's faction was dispersed, and he was captured and executed. Antonuq had become the single ruler of the Greater Zhane and remained in power for at least 22 years from this date, since Evliya Çelebi also recorded Antonuq in 1666.

===== Circassian folklore =====
In Circassian folklore, the story of Qanbolet is dated by researchers to the first half of the 17th century. However, the identity of Qanbolet in folk memory was conflated with Hakushmuq due to similar historical events. At the end of the 15th century, a Zhane prince named Antonuq traveled to the Crimean Khanate to seek military intervention against his rival in an internal conflict in exchange for allegiance. Genoese records from the 1470s note that Prince Barasbiyeqo, the ruler of Copa, had a son named Qanbolet. Because a Zhane prince named Antonuq sought Crimean intervention to defeat his brother during an internal conflict twice over a period of 1.5 centuries, the 17th-century events about Hakushmuq became merged in oral tradition with the 15th-century prince Qanbolet. Although Khan-Giray's accounts mention a prince named Hakushmuq, he is portrayed as a different character.

Oral traditions collected by Shora Nogmov record the conflict of the brothers Qanbolet and Antonuq. The dispute began over rumors regarding a relationship between Qanbolet and Setenay, who was a woman living in Antonuq's house. After Antonuq expelled his brother from the house, Qanbolet sought refuge with his atalyk. Learning that Setenay continued to send gifts to Qanbolet, Antonuq planned to kill him, prompting Qanbolet to flee to the Ottoman Empire for military aid. When this assistance didn't happen, Qanbolet returned with the support of the Zhane people, and established authority over the Zhane people. Antonuq then forced to flee to the Crimean Khan, promising the Khan wealth from the spoils of war if he helped eliminate Qanbolet and his followers.

After a seven-year delay in Crimea, Antonuq received the promised military support from the Crimean Khan. By this time, Qanbolet had managed to win the loyalty of the entire Zhane population and upon learning that his brother was approaching Zhane territory with the Crimean army, he mobilized his people to prepare for their arrival. The subsequent war was fierce and resulted in heavy casualties on both sides. Qanbolet managed to escape the battlefield but the Crimean forces tracked Qanbolet down, trapped and killed him in a coastal bay. With Qanbolet's death, the conflict ended, leaving Antonuq in full control of the Zhane population. After the battle, the Zhane population swore an oath of loyalty to Antonuq. The property of Qanbolet's followers was given to the Crimean army, while accounts vary on whether Setenay was handed over to the Crimeans or exiled. To preserve the memory of these events, Qanbolet's atalyk commissioned a song through folk poets.

The lament of Qanbolet was collected by Shora Nogmov, recorded in old Kabardian (it also includes some Adyghe phonetic influences and grammatical features). The text details the sanctuary and support provided to Qanbolet's side by the Besleney by invoking their sacred bond of hospitality. Among the people mentioned in the song is Pshizadinoqo, a member of the Qanuqo (also spelled as Qanoqo) family, which was the ruling princely dynasty of the Besleney. It describes Qanbolet's retreat to the coast, the deaths of his closest warriors during their last stand, and his final moments before being killed at the sea bay.

Full lyrics of the lament:

Зы цIэкIэ зэгэ, шэсмэ зэгъусэкIэ
Си ЖэндаритIумэ сагъэунэхъущ,
Афэ гъуэпэгуэ, лIыхъу шэрыуэ—
Макъыекъуэ пщ[ы]м батэгуэ си гур хигъачIщ,
Къаны[ы]болэт, гущэмэ!

ТхьэкIумэ жьажьэгуэ бжьы[б]жьы къегъэс.
Докъ и къуэкIэ Санокъуэ хахуэр
Безрыкъуэпщ[ы]мэ хуэкъуэпхъэщ,
Къанболэт, гущ[э]!

Щэбар щырапхъ[ы]гуа, а бжэ чIэкъыпэмэ
Къэрабэ лIыхъ[у]мэ бгъу[н]жгуэ зыресэ[ри]
Зы шу закъуэри фIыгъэкIыжкъэм Къэраб[ы]къуэ Къанокъуэ,
Къан[ы]болэт, гущ[э]!

„Мы жэщыпсмэ хым и торэшыр сокIухь
Сызэрихьэнгуэ мы къалэ мачIэми зы унэ закъуэры щызмыгъуэт,"
Къан[ы]болэты, мыгъуэ!

Ди уэздыгъэщIэмрэ ди щIылъмэ щIыхьмэр[э]
Ди хыпхэмэ урагъ[э]зщ,
Къан[ы]болэт, гущэ!

„Шумэ и къабзэмэрэ лъэсмэ и бзагэмэрэ махуэмэ фыкъызыIучIэ,
Тыр[к]угуэ IэлъэчIыр зителъмэ сытыр къысху[и]чIэщын?"
Къан[ы]болэт, мыгъуэ!

КъафI[ы]зыд[и]хугуэ къажэкIэмычIэ пщыкIэ
Жаныкъыл шэжьхэр къызэредзэкI,
Къан[ы]болэт, мыгъуэ!

„Си фIыгъэхэр зэмыкIэса с[и]Iакъэмэ, икIуэдащ.
Макъый у[ы] хахуэгуэ къуэпщ, батэгуэ си гур хигъачIэщ,"
Къан[ы]болэт, мыгъуэмэ!

„Иги, мыгъуэ, хахуэгуэ Хъумэрыкъуэшхуэр бгъунжгуэ хагъачIэ,
Абы и хьэдэ чIумэ сырагъалъэ,"
Къан[ы]болэт, гущ[э]!

Дыщэплъы фащ[э]гуэ хуэпагуэ щауэр
КъаныкъуэкIэ Пщызэдынокъуэ, узикъуэ къанмэ хуэкъуэпхъ[э]!
Къан[ы]болэт, гущ[э]!

Беслъэныйшхуэмэ я шыгъу-пIастэр хьэлэл тхурехъ[у]!
ЩытхуэмыхъужкIэ, бгъунжгуэ зырасэ, зытесмэ щэгуфIыкIкъэм[и].
Къан[ы]болэт, мыгъуэ!

Translation:

Called by a single name, together when riding
My two Zhandars made me unfortunate,
In mail coats with short sleeves, a brave marksman—
The son of Maqiy, the prince, surely made my heart grieve,
Oh Qanbolet, what grief!

One who is hard of hearing rains down sorrow.
Doq's son valiant Sanoqo
Was worthy of being a son (pupil) to prince Bezruqo,
Oh Qanbolet, what grief!

Where many arrows are poured, at this doorway exit
The valiant Qaraba holds his ground
And does not let even a single rider pass through
Qanoqo Qarabaqo,
Oh Qanbolet, what grief!

"On this dark night, the bay of the sea I walk around,
And to shelter me, in this small town, I cannot find even a single house,"
Oh Qanbolet, what misfortune!

Our new light and the honor of our country
In our foreign lands they forced you to take refuge,
Oh Qanbolet, what grief!

"Purest of the horsemen and fiercest of the infantrymen, gather together on that day,
What help to me is someone who wears a Turkish turban?"
Oh Qanbolet, what misfortune!

Driving enemies against their will, the prince who doesn't know how to flee
Zhaniqil shoots his proven arrows backward [even on the run].
Oh Qanbolet, what misfortune!

"There is none of my good left, to whomever I did it, [yet all] perished.
Maqiy, your valiant prince son, made my heart, once full, shrink in grief,"
Oh Qanbolet, what misfortune!

"Now, o misfortune, they knock valiant Khumaruqo the Great onto his side,
They force me to jump over his corpse,"
Oh Qanbolet, what grief!

As if dressed in red gold, the young man
Pshizadinoqo of Qanuqo, who is your son, let him be a worthy son to the qan (tutor)!
Oh Qanbolet, what grief!

May the salt and paste of Great Besleney be blessed unto us!
Since there is no way out for us, step aside, because the horse he is riding brings no hope at all.
Oh Qanbolet, what misfortune!

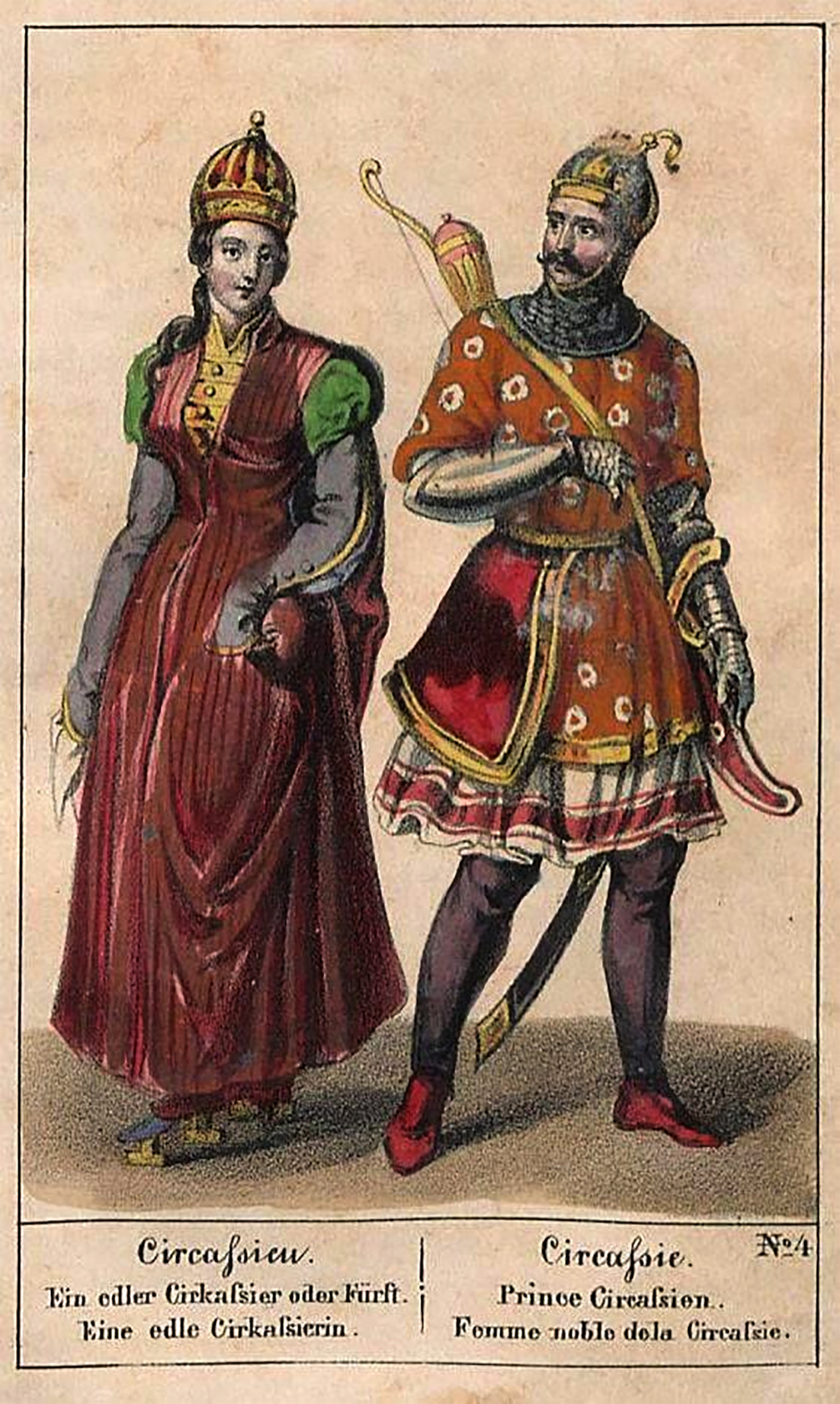
A Circassian noblewoman and a prince

According to oral sources compiled by Sultan Khan-Giray, the Kheghache principality was ruled by two prince brothers, the elder Antonuq and the younger Qanbolet. Antonuq's wife, attracted to Qanbolet, attempted to seduce him and threatened to falsely accuse him of assault if he refused. Qanbolet avoided her during the night but accidentally left an arrow behind, which led Antonuq to believe he was betrayed and to take revenge, Antonuq allied with Crimea and attacked Qanbolet's lands, then captured Qanbolet's pregnant wife. After she shamed Antonuq with her words, he spared her but continued to destroy Qanbolet's villages. Qanbolet fled and sought refuge with a prince named Hakushmuq, whose only son Qanbolet had killed in a past raid. A maid who saw Qanbolet noted his slender waist, remarking that a cat could pass under his side without touching his belt. In accordance with the Circassian custom, Qanbolet claimed protection through Hakushmuq's wife, and Hakushmuq chose to accept him rather than seek revenge. To test his guest's honor, Hakushmuq demanded his weapons, then Qanbolet surrendered everything except his sword, explaining with tears that he kept it to defend against dogs. Hakushmuq respected him and returned all the weapons, then pledged his support in the conflict. Qanbolet later moved to Bzhedugia and started a seven-year war with Antonuq. During the war, Antonuq's wife secretly made male attire and sent it to Qanbolet. Antonuq intercepted the messenger and set a trap to catch them together, but Qanbolet chopped the clothing into pieces and threatened to hang any future messengers. Realizing his brother's innocence, Antonuq reconciled with him, ending the war.

The narrative also includes an episode involving two half-brothers from the noble Dandar (Adyghe: Дэндэр) family, who fought on opposing sides of the conflict. During a battle, the elder brother, fighting for Antonuq, lay dying in a ravine. When his younger brother, who was allied with Qanbolet, mocked his white trousers by calling him a wild goat, the elder brother replied that he was a warrior wearing fine silk trousers, so valuable that their own mother had never tied her head with such material, and told his brother to remove them before they became stained with his blood.

==== Polish–Russian War (1654–1667) ====
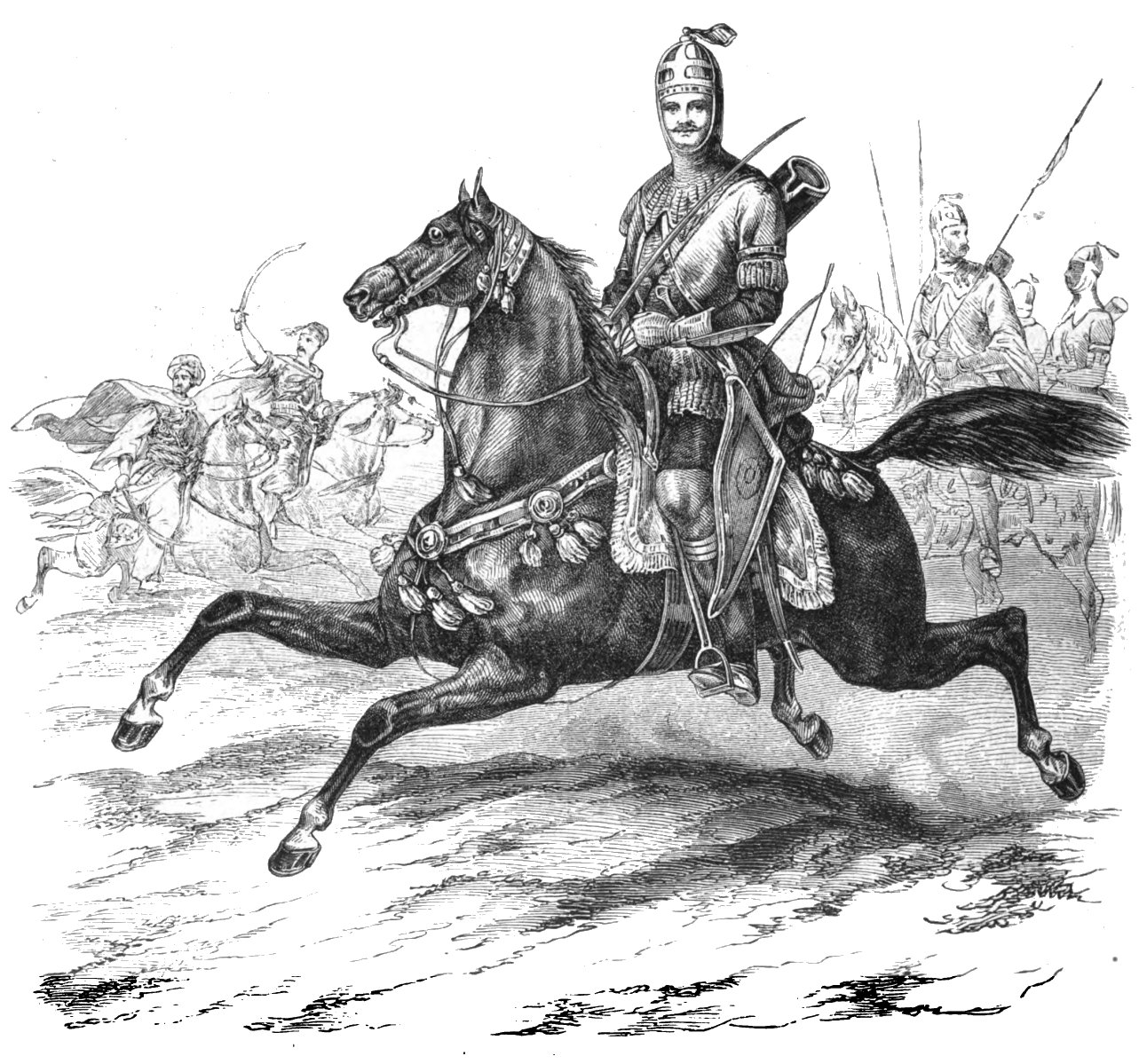
Circassian cavalry

During the Polish–Russian War (1654–1667), when the Crimean Khanate supported Poland against Russia, the Zhane provided warriors to the Crimeans. According to Evliya Çelebi's Seyahatnâme, during this conflict, a massive Russian army led by Vasily Sheremetev advanced toward Crimea. In response, a Circassian force consisting of the Kheghache, Zhane, Mamkhigh, Ademey, Chemguy, Besleney, Kabardian, and Lesser Kabardians joined Mehmed IV Giray's forces at the "Sut" River. The Circassian forces were given the task of surrounding the fortified Russian camp. The battle ended with the defeat of the Russian forces and the capture of Sheremetev, halting the Russian advance into the region during that period.

==== Evliya Çelebi's Observations ====
Evliya Çelebi visited the Greater Zhane in 1666 and noted the following:

The capital of the province of the Circassian tribe of Jana, that is, the throne of the bey of the Jana people: These are five hundred houses covered with reeds and rushes at the foot of the Hayku mountains of Abaza. The name of the bey is Antenok. He possesses ten thousand brave, courageous horsemen with quivers and infantry with muskets. They always engage in war, conflict, battle, and slaughter with the Sadshe (Sadz) Abaza. Finding the Khan here, they gave banquets to the Khan and presented choice girls and male servants. They did not give anything to Selamet Geray Sultan and kept him in this country, because his mother was from the daughters of these Jana. From there, a thousand musketeers from among these were joined as companions to the Khan, and from there again toward the east in 2 hours, the Adakum River, near it the Setaze River: these also come from the Abaza province and go to the Kuban River. From there, again toward the east, traveling for (–) hours through forests and endless trees,

Evliya Çelebi also visited the Lesser Zhane:

In the register of the province of Lesser Jana: This country is more developed than Greater Jana and possesses brave and courageous warriors, having forty villages and three thousand soldiers. While coming to this station on that day, the Abin River, then the Habil River, then the Yil River, then the Aburgan River: we crossed these four waters of life on horses, enduring troubles and difficulties. These also rise from the Obur mountains of Abaza, pass through the soil of this Lesser Jana, and mix into the Kuban River. But we crossed some of these rivers by wading through them, and bridges of wood were built over two of them and they were crossed. They are waters of life that flow turbulently. From there, again toward the east in (–) hours,

According to Evliya Çelebi, in 1666, the Circassians could raise a cavalry army of 33,000 men along, and 13,000 of these soldiers belonged directly to the Zhane.

==== Late 17th century ====
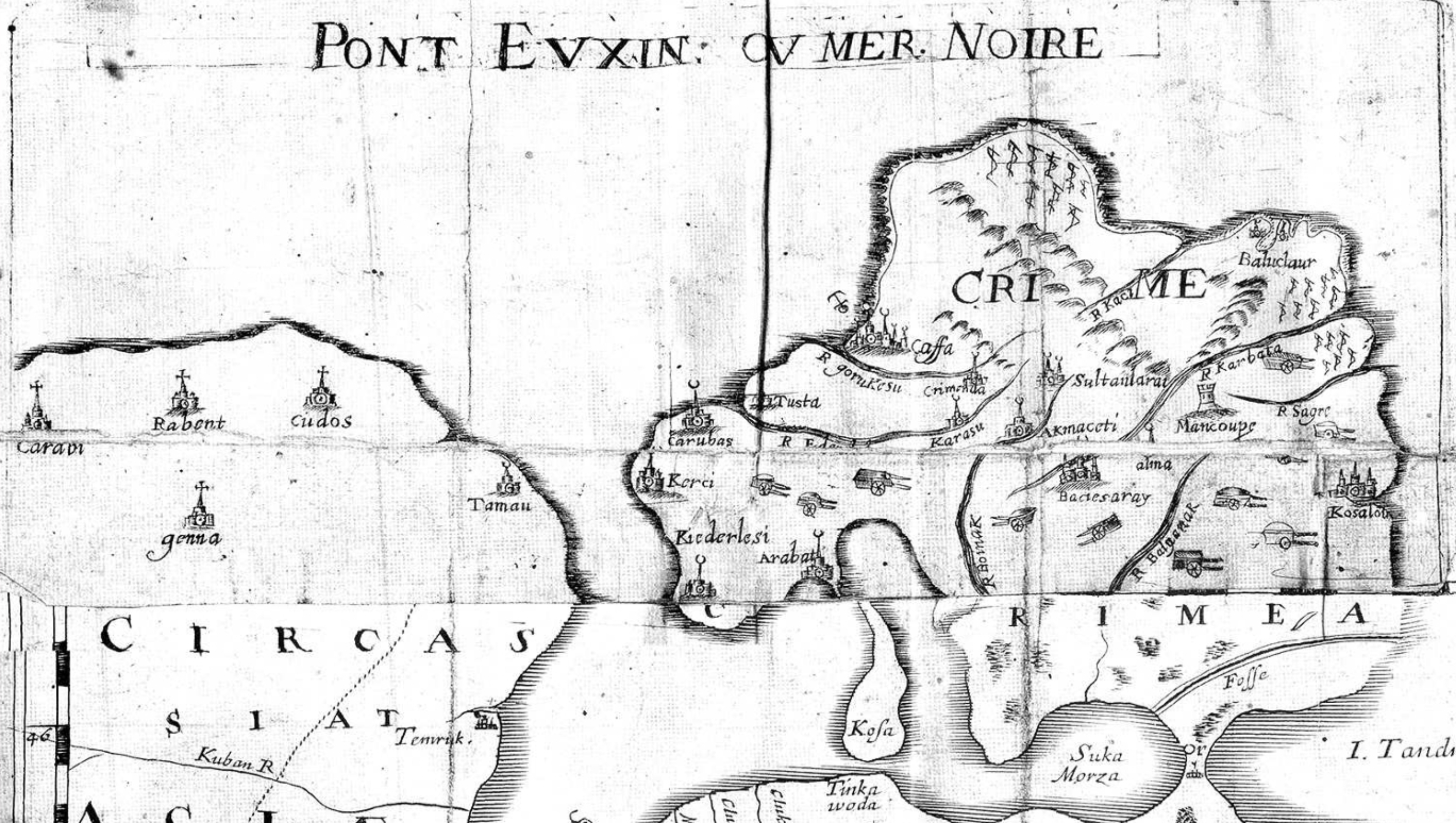
"Genna" represents the Zhane possession. The map shows a part of Western Circassia, featuring two Turkish fortresses marked with a crescent, while Circassian settlements are marked with crosses. Carte d’Vkranie (1660) by Guillaume Levasseur de Beauplan.

In the late 17th century, the contemporary Ottoman historian Hezarfen Hüseyin Effendi stated the following: the Circassians in the Taman region, whose territory bordered the Zhane, were the only Circassian community to which the Ottoman Empire appointed a qadi (judge). According to Hezarfen's records, the Taman Circassians were partially applying Sharia and included the Ottoman judicial system in their governance structure. As a result of this legal process, the enslavement of the members of this community was forbidden.

While the areas from the Zhane up to Kabardia were classified as a war zone (dar al-harb) where slave-taking was allowed, the Taman Circassians was officially protected under Ottoman rule. Those in the Taman region were a western branch of the Zhane, including the Hytuk and Kheghache, that had integrated into the Ottoman administrative structure and was placed under protection. Meanwhile, the main Zhane population residing in the interior plains remained outside Ottoman legal guarantees and considered war zone. These interior Zhane were obligated to present captives as annual tribute to the Crimean khans to prevent military campaigns and provide troops upon request. Record of Hezarfen Hüseyin Effendi:

Ve taraf-ı Devlet-i Aliyye’den kazası tevcih olunan Taman kazasında sakin olan Çerkes taifesinin ki nihayeti Jane Çerkesi’ne müntehidir. Bunlarda ahkâm-ı şer’iyye fi’l-cümle icrâ olunur. Bunlardan istirkâk olunmaz. Jane’den Kabartayi Çerâkisesi’ne varınca harbîlerdir. İstirkâkları sahihdir. Böyle olmaları ile yine hanlara havfen mutîlerdir. Hatta üzerimize sefer etmesün deyü beher sene han hazretlerine ve kalgay, nureddin sultanlara pişkeş nâmına Çerkes esirleri ihdâ iderler. Zira karyelerinde sâkin olan reâyâ, beğlerinin mülkleridir. Ve han hazretleri beğlerinden asker talep itse, kifâyet mikdârı asker gönderirler.

Translation:

The territory of the Circassian communities residing in the district of Taman, whose administration is appointed by the Ottoman Empire, extends as far as the Zhane Circassians. Sharia is partially applied among the Taman Circassians, and they cannot be enslaved. However, the tribes from the Zhane up to the Kabardian Circassians are considered war zone. Therefore, their enslavement is legally permissible. Despite this, they remain obedient to the khans out of fear. In fact, to prevent the khans from launching military campaigns against them, they annually present Circassian slaves as tribute to the Khan, as well as to the kalgay and nureddin sultans [heirs to the Crimean throne]. This is because the commoners living in their villages are considered the property of their lords. Furthermore, if the Khan demands troops from these lords, they provide an adequate number of soldiers.

In the 16th and 17th centuries, the Zhane were one of the most powerful principalities in Western Circassia, and their strength could rival Kabardia.

=== 18th Century ===
In the years 1711 and 1712, French diplomat Aubry de la Mottraye, acting in the service of King Charles XII of Sweden, traveled through Circassia from Taman to Kabardia. During his return journey from Astrakhan into Circassia, he was accompanied by two guides: a Circassian from the Zhane region and a Nogai. In a Zhane village named "Degliad," Mottraye personally observed and described the practice of smallpox inoculation. He noted that Zhane parents sometimes took their children to surrounding areas, including regions under Crimean control, to expose them to infected individuals for immunity. Mottraye compared the physical appearance of the Zhane population with that of the Nogais under Crimean jurisdiction, noting distinct physical features between the groups. He also recorded that Zhane women possessed skills in horsemanship and weapon handling that differed from Crimean Tatar women.

According to Mottraye's Nogai guide, a battle between the Crimean Khanate and Western Circassians took place slightly west of the Anapa meridian, where the Caucasian mountain range ends near the sea. While the Crimean Khan was encamped in the area, Western Circassian forces took advance measures to control most of the mountain passes. The Circassians then attacked the Crimean army and defeated them. Following the defeat, the routed Tatar forces had only a few narrow and hazardous passes available for retreat, leading many panicked cavalrymen to fall off cliffs with their horses and die. Samir Khotko suggested that these Circassian forces were likely Zhane.

Near the town of Kalbata on the right bank of the Kuban River, Mottraye's Zhane guide stated that he did not accept the Crimean Khan as his sovereign. The guide reported that he had participated in the Battle of Kanzhal, which Kabardians defeated the Crimean army along with Western Circassian forces. Although contemporary maps indicated that the Zhane paid tribute to the Crimean Khan, the population acted independently and refused tribute payments. Mottraye observed that while Islam had spread to the Zhane via Crimea, its adoption did not translate into recognition of Crimean authority. Neither of his guides performed prayer and that the Zhane guide was indifferent to religious rules, attempting at one point to eat wild boar meat until deterred by the presence of his Nogai companion.

During the reign of Crimean Khan Fetih Giray between 1736 and 1737, diplomatic records mention a Zhane prince named "Ilkas Bey". His son, Kayin Ahmed Agha, served as an envoy for Ottoman Grand Vizier Es-Seyyid Mehmed Pasha to invite Fetih Giray to a military camp in the Kartal region. Ilkas Bey is identified as a Zhane leader whose family held marital ties to the Giray dynasty, as his daughter was married to Sultan Ahmed (Sultan is the Crimean title for prince).

In the first half of the 18th century, while most West Circassians resided south of the Kuban River, the Zhane maintained a notable population north of the river, with approximately 300 settlements across the peninsula under the authority of the Zhane prince around 1740. The administrative center of the principality was the town of Zhane, located on the banks of the Kuban River, where the ruler resided and held responsibility for the management of all settlements on the peninsula. Within the regional administration, the Zhane princes were tasked with maintaining security across the Taman Peninsula, and Temryuk functioned as the second most important location in the local settlement hierarchy after the capital.

Between 1750 and 1762, French diplomat Charles de Peyssonnel recorded the Zhane under the name "Janua", and listed them among the Circassians subject to tribute to the Crimean Khan and located them near the end of his east-to-west geographical distribution, between the "Kichekene-Egherkouai" (Yejeruqay) and "Altikesek-Abaza". An examination of Peyssonnel's writings shows that they contain inaccurate information of the regions of Circassia, including geographic errors and non-existent communities or descriptors. A Russian archival record from May 1753 states that the Zhane, Abzakh and Shapsug, had complete independence from the authority of the Crimean Khan.

=== Russo-Circassian War ===
In Caucasian studies, the dissolution of the Zhane is linked to their physical destruction from Russian attacks during the Russo-Circassian War and previous Crimean raids, as their lands became a continuous battlefield.

When listing the sub-ethnic groups around the Anapa Fortress in the 1780s, Zhane rulers were recorded as "Imhas" and "Bashkoy", the principality consisted of 300 households, and they lived 9 hours away from Anapa. In August 1783, a Russian military detachment of approximately 500 soldiers crossed south of the Kuban River and attacked the Zhane and Hatuqay settlements, killed the inhabitants and looted the property.

By 1783, the Russian military had established a permanent battalion at Kapılı and maintained a constant presence at all river crossings, enabling raiding parties of 700 to 800 soldiers to systematically target the Besleney, Chemguy, Bzhedug, and Zhane territories. This military pressure compelled the leadership of these principalities to report that without direct Ottoman military intervention, they could no longer sustain their resistance against the encroaching forces.

In October 1783, following the increasing Russian mobilizations in the region, the Zhane leaders joined a major strategic council at the Antkhir plain between Zhane and Hatuqay. Alongside the leaders of the Besleney, Hatuqay, Chemguy, Bzhedug, and Makhosh principalities, the Zhane swore a formal oath to Ferah Ali Pasha to remain loyal to the Ottoman Sultan. During this assembly, Ferah Ali Pasha prevented Circassians from launching attacks against the "agitator" Shahin Giray, thereby stopping a major regional conflict with Russia. The Circassians requested urgent Ottoman military aid from the Russian border violations and requested official titles to formalize their status as "Ottoman-aligned defenders". According to the memoirs of General Musa Kundukhov, who recorded the testimony of Kabardian prince Alkhas Misost Bechmirza (who was serving in the Russian army), Prince Qizbech Qanoqo (Grand Prince of the Besleney Principality) was elected as the supreme leader of the Kuban Circassians during this assembly. Alkhas stated that the Circassians chose him because he embodied all the traits of an ideal leader, and a population of "approximately 100,000 households" swore absolute obedience to him.

In 1784, a joint petition against the Russian threat was submitted to the Ottoman center by several Circassian representatives, including Ali Khanuqo from Bzhedug, Mirzabech Shameqo from Kheghache/Hytuk, Hajji Ibrahim from Abzakh, and Hajji Ibrahim from Shapsug, alongside Köse Hajji Mehmed, a nobleman of the Zhane prince named "Timur Bey" or "Demir Bey". Circassian representatives reported that Russia built three new fortresses along the Kuban River and gathered troops near Taman. They requested that the Ottoman Empire build fortresses and palankas in their areas. They asked for guards from Anatolia, promising to assist the defense from the outside. The representatives warned that Russia would attack at the first opportunity. In fact, Russian forces had already violated the peace by crossing the river and attacking local populations. They added that if the locals reported these attacks to Istanbul, the Russians would deny the actions and distort the facts to blame the Circassians.

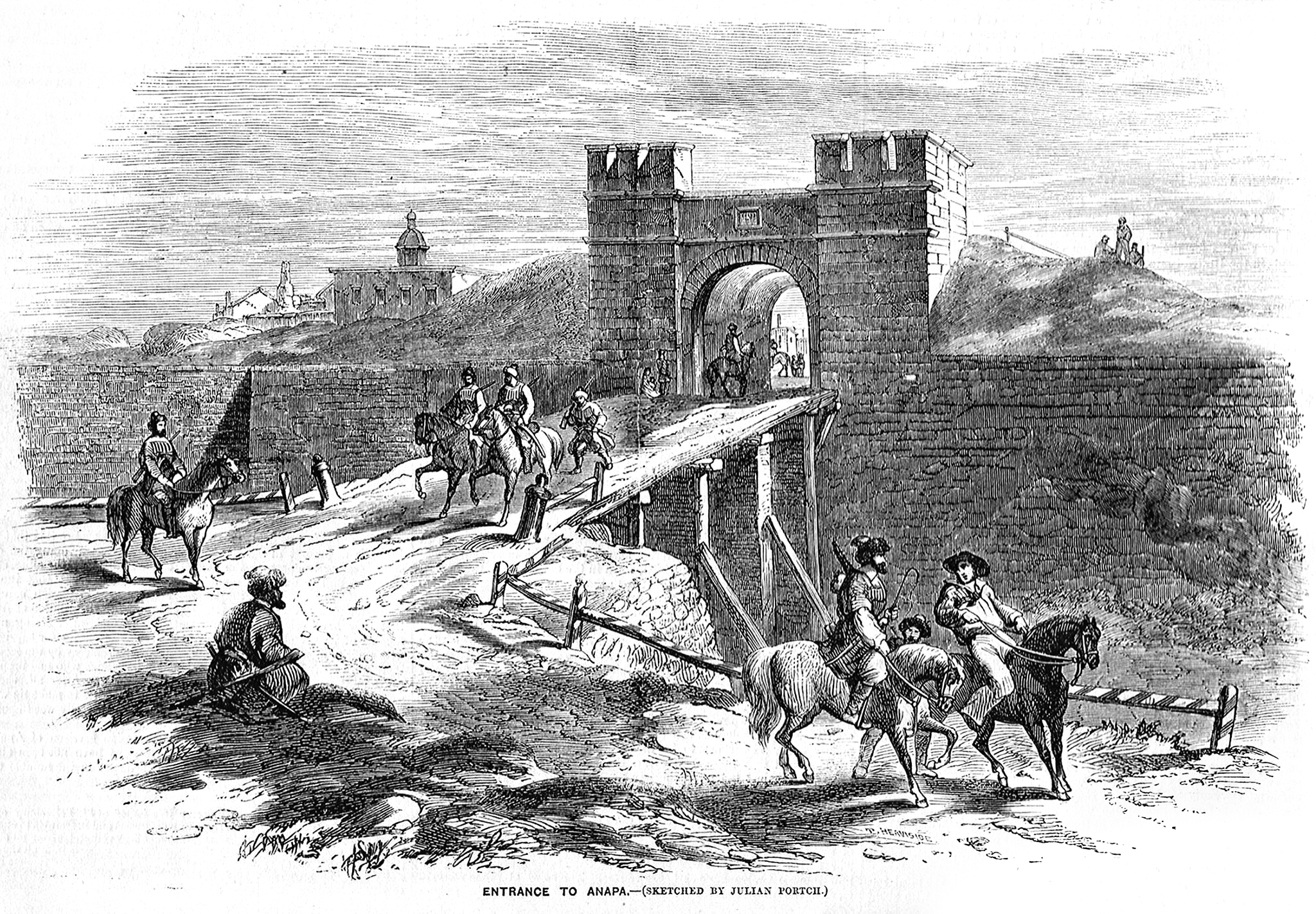
Entrance to Anapa

Between 1785 and 1786, a mud fort was built in the Hatuqay and Zhane to protect the newly settled Nogai tribes, costing a total of 1,350 kuruş. In 1786, the rulers and elders of the Chemguy, Hatuqay, Bzhedug, Zhane, Kheghache, and Nogais attended a council at the Anapa Fortress to resolve a conflict between the Nogais and Natukhaj.

During the Sheikh Mansur movement, the Zhane were a part of the anti-Russian resistance in the Caucasus and formed an alliance with Kabardians, Shapsugs, and Abzakhs to fight against the Russian forces.

In 1787, during the Russo-Turkish War of 1787–1792, the approach of Russian armies caused the Zhane to leave their territories north of Kopyl. They relocated to the left bank of the Kuban River, established six villages under the rule of Mishawost Melichjeriy Zaneqo in the Red Forest (Adyghe: Мэзыплъ) area. In 1788, during his march on Anapa, the Russian general Berkhman destroyed settlements (approximately 2,000 houses) around the "Zana" area, in order to crush resistance in the region and secure the river crossing.

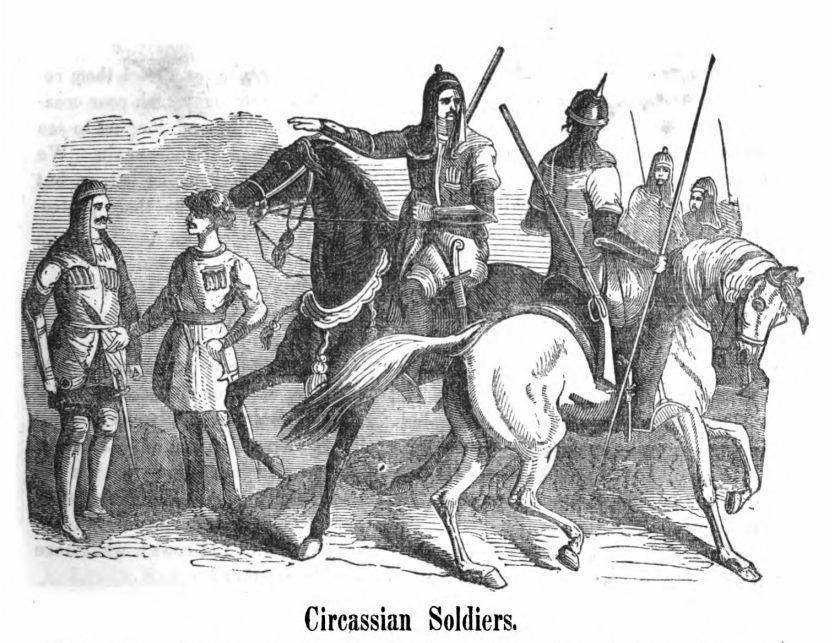
Circassian soldiers drawn by Edmund Spencer.

On 20 February 1790, a Russian force of around 12,000 crossed the Kuban River and entered the Hatuqay and Zhane regions. Circassians fought on 15 locations during harsh winter conditions. A total of 15,000 Circassian warriors in local units were actively defending the region including those in the Anapa fortress. The civil population retreated to mountainous regions. Ottoman commander Battal Huseyin Pasha sent 3,000 soldiers with artillery to Circassians. The Russian army was defeated and forced to retreat. Ottomans sent the Circassians gifts for the victory.

Between 1791 and 1792, the Zhane was included among the Circassian and Abaza people whose official seals were kept by the government to manage their official business when traveling to and from Istanbul, and these seals were recorded in the "Mühimme Defteri" (Registers of Important Affairs).

On 5 August 1792, the Zhane princes "Masuyet Bey" who was also listed as "Misust" and "Mishubest" (Mishawost), "Ilchent Bey", and "Tatar Shu Bey" (Tatarshau) officially requested that merchant ships from Istanbul come directly to the Anapa port to meet their trade needs. On 11 August, these same princes arrived in Anapa with more than 40 noblemen. During the ceremony, they took an oath to remain subjects of the Ottoman Empire, to treat the empire's friends as friends and its enemies as enemies, and to fully obey the sultan's orders. Circassians, including the Zhane, maintained a loyalty to the Ottoman Empire that was only nominal and conditional. Their allegiance depended directly on the value, honors, and gifts provided by the Ottomans, and was specifically linked to their need for military assistance against Russia.

In 1792, Bahadir Giray Sultan, son of Khan Arslan Giray, left Ottoman Rumelia and fled to Circassia due to local political conflicts and public order issues. His refuge was backed by his atalyk relation with Circassians, particularly the Natukhaj. In November 1793, Bahadir Giray petitioned the Sublime Porte for a pardon to return to Rumelia. Circassian leaders submitted a joint application supporting his pardon. The Ottoman government accepted the petition to prevent him from inciting Circassians and to avoid diplomatic problems with Russia. The Circassians petitioning for his pardon included the Natukhaj, Shapsug, Abzakh, and Zhane.

P. S. Pallas noted in 1793-1794 that the Zhane consisted of six villages, with four on the banks of the Atakum River and two located further down on the shore of a small lake. Zhane was governed a leader named Prince Mishawost Melichjeriy ("Misost Melikirei") and was capable of bringing 200 well-armed men into the field. His account also noted that while the population engaged in agriculture and cattle rearing, they were poorer than other Circassian communities and had a reputation for robbing. Pallas also noted in his description of the Natukhajs that they were hostile to all of their neighbors except for the Zhane.

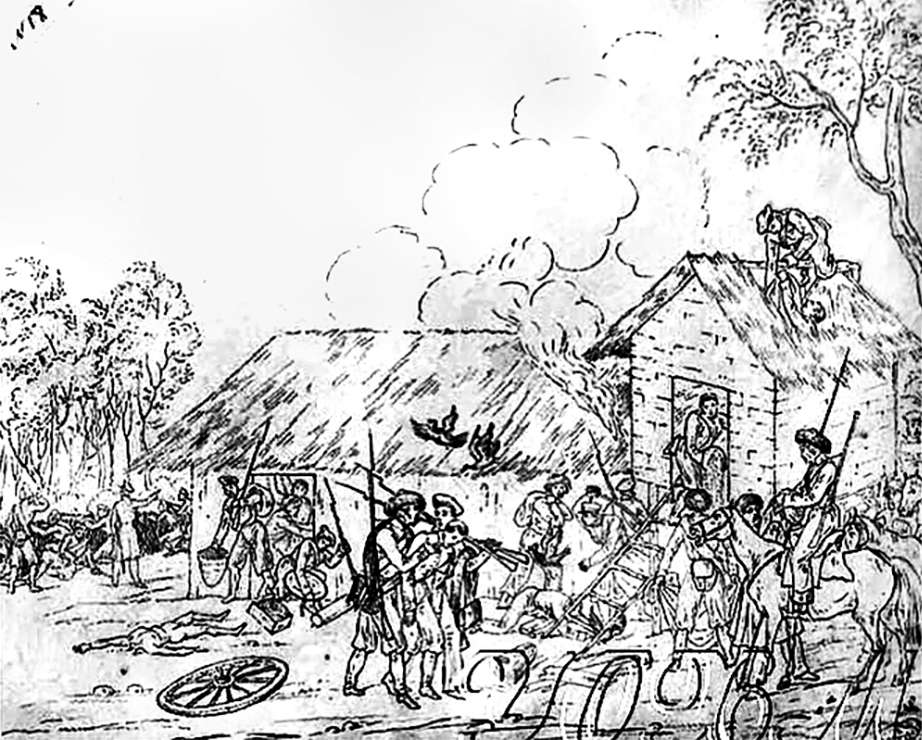
Aftermath of a Russian attack on a Circassian village

In the spring of 1802, the Black Sea Cossacks (supported by two Jäger regiments) who were settled in the Russian military line launched a major campaign against the Zhane after they seized boats carrying gunpowder and cannons from Taman across the Kuban. As a result of this attack, the Zhane settlements were completely destroyed, and most of the people were killed or taken as captives.

According to data from Julius Klaproth between 1807 and 1808, the Zhane was largely destroyed by the 1790s from wars and plagues. Once consisting of thousands of households, only a small group of 20 to 30 families survived near the streams close to Anapa, near Pshets and Khokhay rivers, ruled by their princes Alkhas Melichjeriy ("Alias Melik-Girey") and Netakhoqo Zan ("Metakhuko"). Bronevsky also recorded the same information from Klaproth.

In 1804, Ottomans demanded that Circassians, including the Zhane, return the loots they had taken during attacks against Russians. This demand was made because the Ottoman administration sought to maintain its peace agreement with Russia while preserving its influence over Circassians. In 1804, Colonel Izmail-Bey Atajukov created a genealogy table as an attachment to a report regarding problems on the Caucasus Line. Sent to Lieutenant General Glasenap and likely Russian Emperor Alexander I, the document splits Circassians into groups subject to either Russia or the Ottomans. The Zhane is placed under the Ottoman group, with the "Zhanov" family noted as their leaders.

Following the attack by the Black Sea Cossacks in 1802, the Zhane lost their political independence, and Prince Netakhoqo Zan, who was a respected prince, started to work to reunite the scattered people into a single settlement.

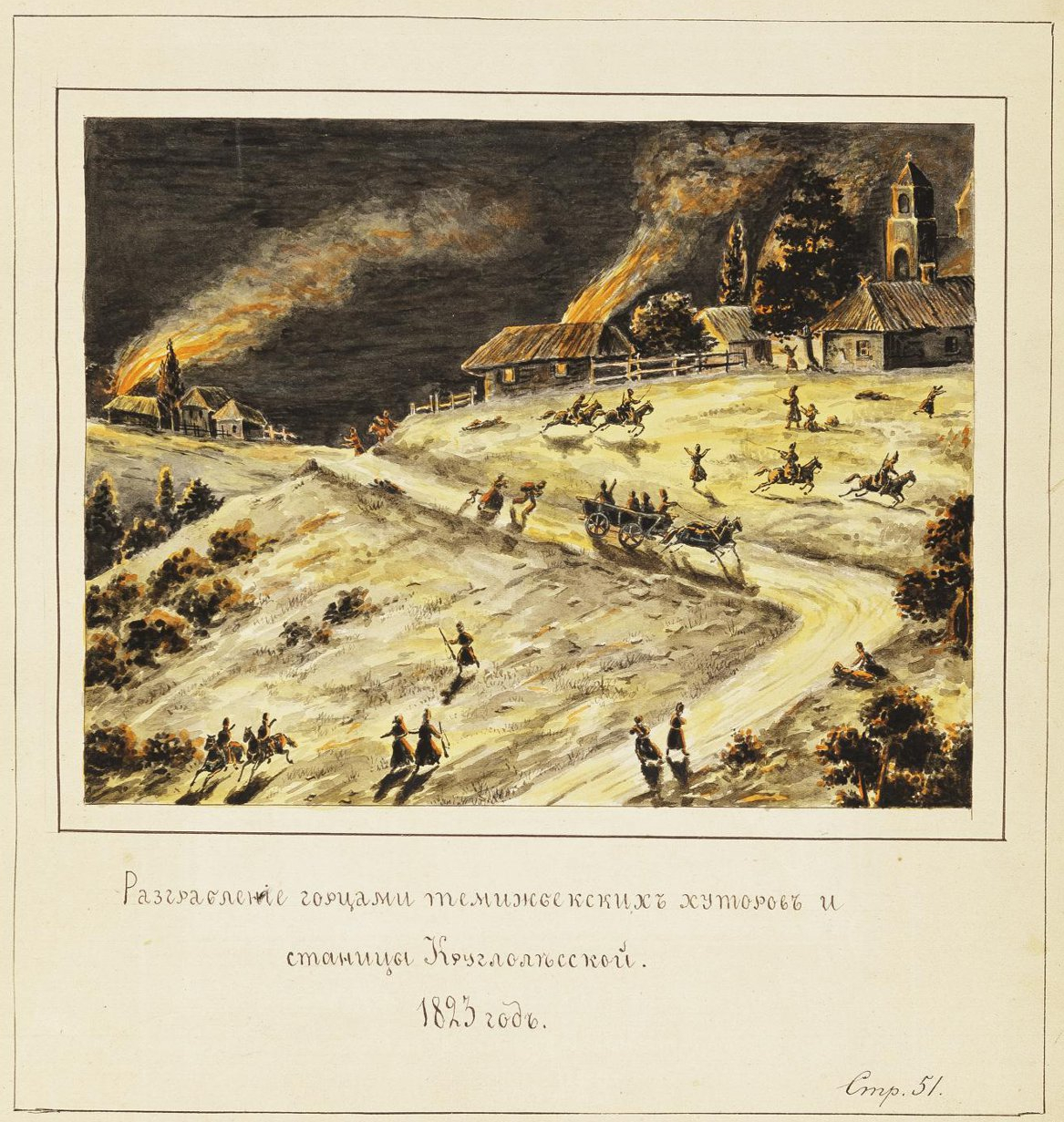
Burning of the Kruglolesskaya stanitsa in 1823.

In the early 19th century, the Ottoman Empire sought to establish a buffer zone in the Caucasus by aligning with local groups to stop the Russian advance. This balance shifted after the 1812 Treaty of Bucharest. In the early 1820s, Russian General Yermolov attacked villages near Anapa, which forced locals into the mountains. New defense positions had established. In October 1821, a large group of Shapsug and Zhane warriors led by a Shapsug leader named Ismail gathered near the Davydovka River to launch an attack near Kalaus. Russian forces led by General Maxim Vlasov defeated them, which caused a large unrest in the region. In 1822, General Vlasov started a campaign to the region and destroyed 17 villages and 119 hamlets. In response to this attack in 1823, the Circassians launched new campaigns in which they burned the Kruglolesskaya stanitsa. The clashes and the Russian campaigns to burn villages and take survivors as prisoners continued.

Tensions from the Greek War of Independence also led to rumors of a large Russian military campaign, causing unrest in the region. Hasan Pasha was appointed Governor of Trebizond and Commander of Anapa and he started diplomatic and religious efforts in 1826. Two Ottoman documents, one from November 1826 and the other from the late 1820s or early 1830s, list the Zhane rulers: Natuk-bek (Netakhoqo), Chuhuk-bek (Pshiquy Chukhoq), and Misos-bek (Mishawost). Bitmaght Bechqan was a Zhane prince recorded by Mahir Effendi.

These efforts resulted in an alliance in 1827. Circassian and Abaza people swore allegiance to the Ottoman Empire in Anapa, including the Zhane, in a coordination with other Circassians. Document of the allegiance treaty of Zhane included 18 signatories: 16 from the aristocratic "bek" class and two from the religious class. This included the signature and seal of the last leader of the principality as a formal entity, Prince Netakhoqo Zan (Ottoman Turkish: ظان نطاخوق بيك, romanized: Ẓān Naṭākhūq Bek) and Prince Pshiquy Chukhoq (Ottoman Turkish: جوخوق بك, romanized: Cūḫūq Bek). As a guarantee of this loyalty, the Ottomans took amanat (hostage) from the Circassians, including two individuals from the Zhane.

Zhane Signatories of the 1827 Allegiance Treaty
Ottoman Turkish	Transliteration	Adyghe	English	Class
محمد كراي	Muḥammad Karāy	Мыхьамэдчэрый	Muhammadcheriy	Bek
يديكي	Yedikī	Едыгь	Yedig	Bek
محمد الكراي بك	Muḥammad al-Karāy	Мыхьамэдчэрый	Muhammadcheriy	Bek
اسلام	Islām	Ислъам	Yislam	Bek
قره شاي	Qarah Shāy	Къэрэщай	Qarashay	Bek
شاوجن	Shāwjan	Шэуджэн	Shojen	Bek
جوخوق	Cūḫūq	Цухъокъу	Chukhoq	Bek
ظان نطاخوق	Naṭākhūq	НэтIахъокъу	Netakhoq	Bek
العبد الداعي محمد افندي (Note: In the original Ottoman text, Muhammad Efendi and Ali Efendi use the introductory phrase al-ʿAbd al-Dāʿī (العبد الداعي), which means "the supplicant servant." This was a standard formula used by Ottoman religious figures to indicate their title.)	Muḥammad	Мыхьамэд	Muhammad	Effendi
العبد الداعي علي افندي	Alī	Алый	Aliy	Effendi
حسن	Ḥasan	Хьэсэн	Hasan	Bek
ابراهيم	Ibrāhīm	Ибрахьим	Ibrahim	Bek
قره بك	Qarah Bek	Къарбэч	Qarbech	Bek
تسركج	Tsarkaj	ЦIэракIужъ	Tsarakuj	Bek
شارثلوك	Shārthlūk	ШэрэлIыкъу	Sheretluq	Bek
تمروق	Tamrūq	Темрыкъу	Temruq	Bek
كوشوق	Kūshūq	Кощэкъу	Koshoq	Bek
دولت كراي	Dawlat Karāy	Долэтчэрый	Doletcheriy	Bek

Russia opposed these moves and diplomatically protested Istanbul. The text accused the commander of Anapa of training the local populations, obstructing Russian merchants, and inciting hostility. Spies entered the region to disrupt the alliance through gifts for local leaders. This defense system dissolved during the Russo-Turkish War (1828–1829). The subsequent Treaty of Adrianople legally ended Ottoman influence in the Caucasus.

Prince Netakhoqo died a few years before 1836, which marked the end of the independent existence and the majority of the Zhane population integrated into other Circassian sub-ethnic groups, mostly to Bzhedug, Shapsug, and Natukhaj. After his death and the following plague, the remaining Zhane people were living in a single settlement on the Pshish River, under the Principality of Cherchenay (Western Bzhedugia).

According to Zhane prince Selim, they first settled in the Atakum region near the Kuban River. They lost their power more when their slaves escaped without paying legal compensation, and then they moved to Bzhedug. Then they settled on the north bank of the Kuban River, opposite the island occupied by the Shapsug noble Abat family.

==== Zhane remnants in Karakuban ====
According to Adolf Berzhe, in 1804, there were remnants of the Zhane in the Karakuban region. In the 1830s and 1840s, at the call of their princes, the remaining Zhane groups from Pshada and other regions migrated to Karakuban Island. Russian administrative records from the 19th century confirm that the ownership and settlement structures belonging to the Zhane aristocracy continued to exist. Documents from 1836 mention the name of the Zhane landowner Sheretluqo Bechqan as the manager of a settlement located on Karakuban. In Russian records from the 1830s, Zhane prince Sheretluqo Alqas and nobleman Muhammadcheriy Osman were recorded as settled in Karakuban after becoming Russian subjects. Lulye noted that the Zhane in Karakuban were located 70 versts downstream from the Bzhedug settlements.

In early 1838, Natukhaj leader Hawduqo Mansur sent a message to the Circassian leadership complaining about the Zhane branch and the Abat clan that had migrated to the banks of the Kuban River and left their homeland, accusing them of looting in the region. Mansur said that these groups should either be forced to return to their homeland or face "entire extermination." In the same year, Qizbech Tughuzhuqo launched an attack at the Karakuban Zhane, who had sworn allegiance to Russia. In the early 1840s, Khan Giray noted that only ten or twenty poor huts remained on Karakuban Island.

Zhane prince "Bechkan Yamgoruk Kumek" held the rank of Ensign in the Russian army, receiving both medals and monetary rewards for his service. He had been promoted to the rank of Ensign on May 5, 1841. According to a document from 1849, he was no longer on active duty at that time and was residing in Karakuban. A father and his three sons served in the Russian military, but their exact origin is uncertain because some records list them as Zhane nobles while other records list them as Besleney nobles. The family included Shagan-Cherey Gusarov (c. 1780–after 1825) and his sons Beslan Gusarov (1812–after 1873), Arslan-Girey Gusarov (c. 1815–after 1857), and Krym-Girey Gusarov (1820–1863).

==== Zhane remnants in Atakum ====
According to Lulye's records from the mid-19th century, several Zhane families continued to live near the Atakum river among the Natukhajs.

James Stanislaus Bell visited Circassia in the years 1837 and 1840 and John Longworth in the years 1837 and 1838. Bell recorded the Zhane as "Janat" and Longworth recorded as "Wana." Their leading representative was Prince Selim, who had served in the Ottoman cavalry with the rank of major. Selim had formerly occupied a post in the seraglio at Constantinople and commanded a regiment in the imperial guard. Longworth also noted that after his brother, Pshiquy, fell in battle, Selim returned to Circassia and arranged his family affairs. He remained in Circassia because he thought it was "disgraceful to live in ease and opulence at Constantinople while his own country was struggling for its very existence with the Muscovite." Selim was listed among the most influential nobles of the Natukhaj region.

Longworth stated that Selim had seen more of the world than most of his countrymen, which resulted in less "stiffness" in his manners and a lively conversation. Bell notes that although Selim was a professional soldier, he had a flexible character. At that period, Circassian leadership felt disappointment toward the Ottoman Empire and believed they did not send them enough help. Joining a joke started by Mehmet Efendi, Selim ironically said that if they were ever forced to surrender to Russia, they would offer Russia 40,000 cavalrymen to plunder Turkey. In a conversation with John Longworth, Selim joked that to prove he had no prejudices, Longworth could marry his sister. Bell noted that judging by Selim's own facial features, his sister had to be "beautiful." Both Longworth and Bell noted that Selim had "fine features."

Bell classified the Zhane princes as a noble house, consisting of 15 families, representing one of the highest-ranking and most respected noble classes in Circassia. They had high social status because they claimed to be "Sultanic" origin which meant that they were a part of the Boletuqo fraternity of Chemguy. Because of this status, the Prince of Zhane was the only person allowed to sit next to the highest-ranking princes in meetings.

On July 23, 1837, Selim's daughter was in a serious condition due to an inflammation of the face. Selim sent a messenger to James Bell to request medical advice and specific supplies for her treatment. He asked for fifty drachms of sugar, pens, and paints of various colors to write a healing charm. Bell fulfilled all requests by sending the charm supplies, medicine for the girl’s inflammation, and some tea.

Between August 28 and 30, 1837, Selim acted as a messenger between the British and Prince "Pshugui Atsha'ïgag-oku" (Pshiquy Akhezhagoqo) of Bzhedug. Selim brought the news that Pshiquy Akhezhagoqo accepted the invitation to come to Tsemez. On August 28, 1837, during Pshiquy Akhezhagoqo's visit, all other leaders and lower-ranking people stood up to show respect to the prince. However, because his lineage was of "Sultanic" origin, Selim was the only person who had the freedom to remain seated in his presence during the .

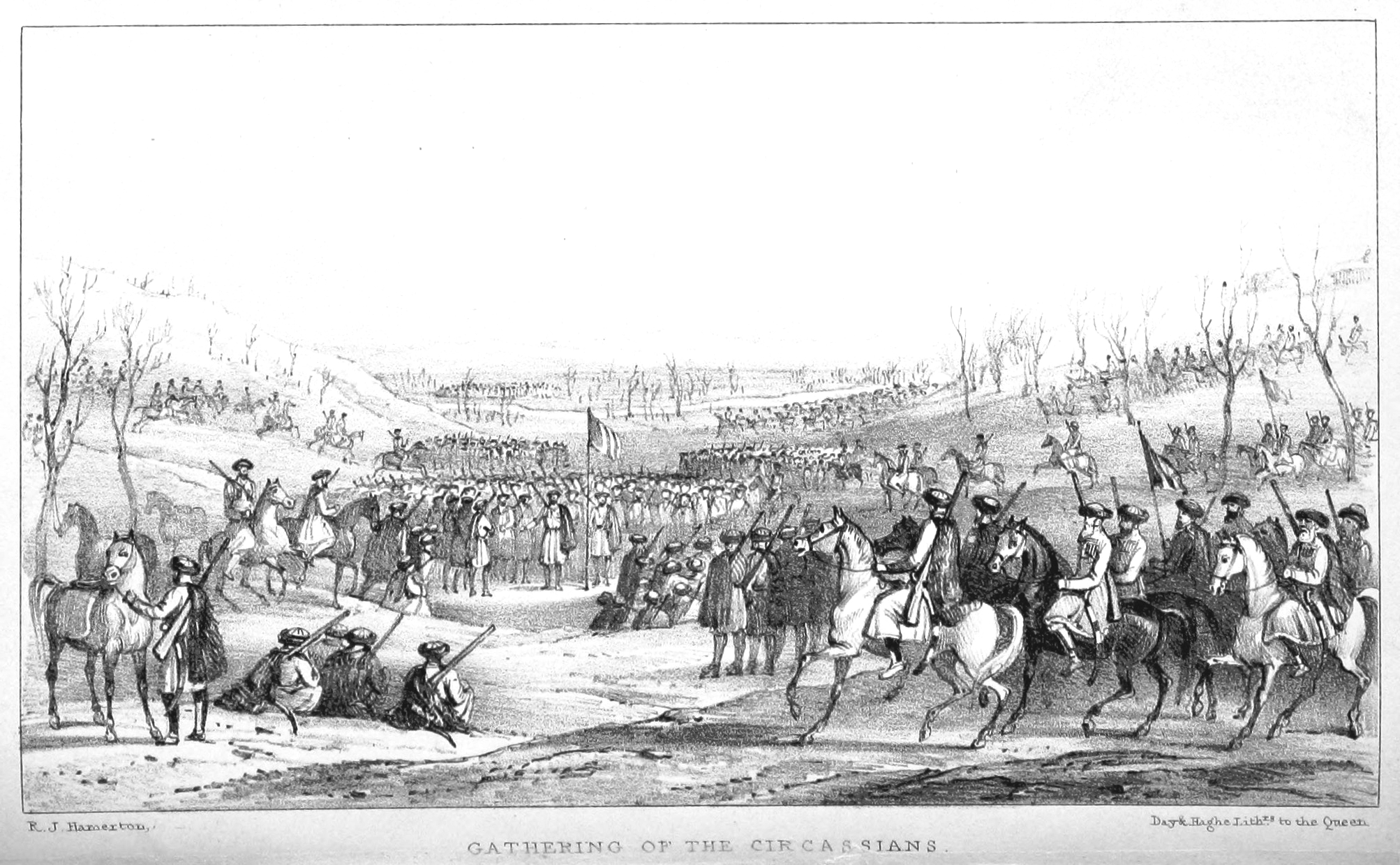
Atakum Assmbly in 1837, drawn by J. Longworth

The Atakum Assembly was held between May 22 and 29, 1837, by the Natukhaj and Shapsugs to address the arrival of the British delegates in their lands and upon the crossing of the Kuban and advanced with an army of 10,000 soldiers under General Velyaminov. The assembly included Abzakh delegation, Zhane prince Selim, Chopsin prince Pshimaf, and the British delegates Bell and Longworth. The assembly received the British delegates under the national Circassian flag with enthusiasm.

During the assembly, a Russian declaration demanding surrender by General Velyaminov, which claimed that Russian bayonets would catch the sky if it fell, was read aloud. The Circassians mocked and rejected this declaration, then wrote that their children would take up arms against the Russians even before birth. The participants discussed the cessation of Turkish support, military intelligence about the Russian army provided by Polish deserters, internal peace initiatives, news that the Kabardians resisted supplying soldiers to Russia. Leaders used the example of the Roman fasces. The assembly also encouraged the National Oath and concluded with discussions on military and logistical support from neighboring provinces alongside a closing speech promising paradise to those killed in battle.

On September 3, 1837, the Atakum Assembly was held again to discuss the expected assistance from Britain. On the return from the assembly on September 5, the British delegates held a private meeting with Pshiquy Akhezhagoqo and Selim in a field. They analyzed the Russian attempts to obtain loyalty documents from local leaders before the Tsar's scheduled visit. They also discussed the activities of the "renegade" nobles in the Russian army who tried to convince the provinces to surrender, alongside joint defense strategies and alliances between interior provinces, such as Bzhedug and Abzakh.

By 1838, the lack of expected British assistance caused hesitation among Circassian leaders. On January 6, 1838, Bell and Longworth decided to bypass coastal restrictions to establish direct contact with interior regions like Bzhedug. Judge Mehmet Effendi blocked the communication. Selim arrived at the delegates' camp. To bypass the judge's restrictions and threats, the delegates sent Selim as an envoy to the interior provinces. Selim undertook the mission to Bzhedug to collect support letters for a delegation to England, inform interior leaders about the political situation, and coordinate defense measures.

Selim’s younger brother, Pshiquy, was killed in a battle against the Russians. James Bell included a lament about Pshiquy in his letter, and Selim helped translate it. Bell noted that while the lament was being performed, Selim bowed his head and wept. In the song, Pshiquy was called "the last of his race" because Selim had been away in the Ottoman army for a long time, there was no news from him, and people were doubting if he was still alive.

Lament of Prince Pshiquy (Пщыкъуйыпщ итхьаусыхэ)

Before the years of his puberty had arrived,

His courage was matured.

He died, not in defence of his native village,

But to display his bravery.

He heard the music of the red-haired Muscovite chieftain,

And wielding his sabre to its sounds,

He rushed into the midst of the enemy.

He was the last of his race,

And its heritage has passed into the hands of others.

His sister's hair was dark and glossy like the black silk of Leipzig;

But, in her grief, she has torn it from her head,

Because the chief of her house had fallen.

He rushed against the steed of the red-haired chief;

The general escaped,

But Pshiquy bore off his charger,

Of the valued race of Tram, and its housings.

In the morning he left his home about an affair of peace,

And in the evening he was carried back in his grave-clothes.

"God be thanked," cried his mother,

"That thou hast fallen in the field of honour,

And not in the pursuit of plunder."

Twice in the battle he changed his steeds,

But his heart was unchanged,

And thus Pshiquy fell.

When the women of the village for whose safety he had fought,

Saw him stretched lifeless before them,

They tore their raiment and cried,

"We have lost the prince, our deliverer!"

His sabre had saved them from captivity.

The soul of Pshiquy is fled,

But his body and arms have been saved from the hands of the enemy.

When he uncovered his deadly rifle,

The rapid shots filled the Muscovites with fear,

As numerously they fell beneath them.

The sun shone full on his crimson garments;

And, like the sun, he became conspicuous in the midst of the field.

His black horse swept through the fight,

Swift as a hawk,

While blood from the sabre of Pshiquy dyed his sleeve.

With his last breath he said,

"Take my faithful steed to my beloved,

The daughter of my host;

In seeing it she will think she again sees her Pshiquy."

His friends shed tears of water,

But his sister tears of blood.

Youth has fallen a martyr in the midst of war!

==== Circassian genocide and exile ====
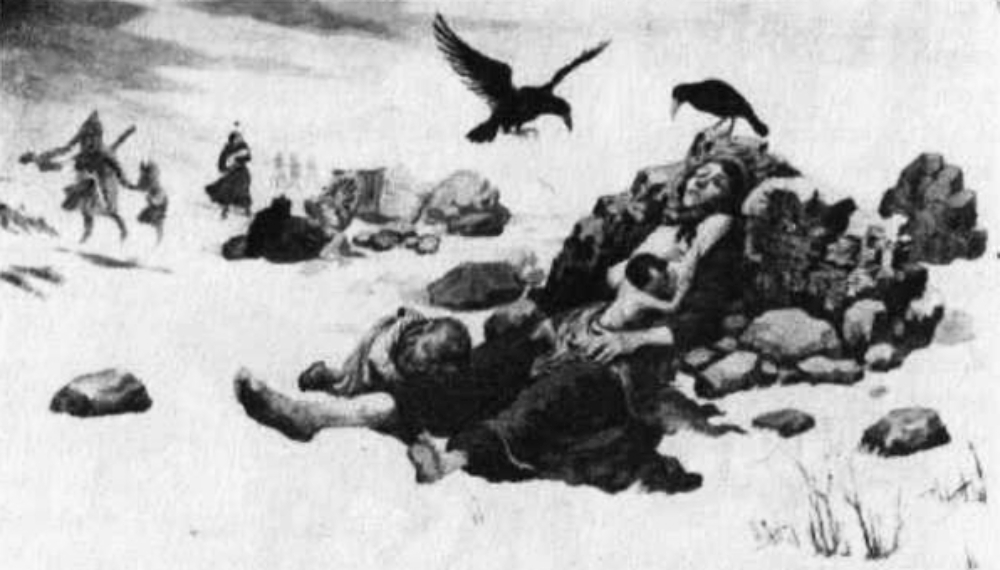
Circassians during the exile, unknown artist.

The Russian Empire based its military actions in Circassia on annexing land and removing the local population. The government viewed clearing the Black Sea coast and exiling the inhabitants to the Ottoman Empire as a requirement to end the war. In 1857, General Dmitry Milyutin created the plan to remove the indigenous population and colonize the area with mainly Cossack and Russian settlers. Tsar Alexander II and the military command demanded that no Circassians remain especially near the coast to prevent them from helping enemy states in future wars. During the final period from 1861 to 1864, the Russian army continued to burn Circassian settlements, destroyed crops, and forced people toward the coast. This caused heavy Circassian losses due to starvation, disease, and winter conditions. The Great Parliament of Independence had ceased its activities in 1863 due to the intensity of the war, the humanitarian crisis, and the previous destruction of the parliament building. Over half a million people eventually left on ships for Ottoman ports. The Russian government tried to present this movement to Europe as voluntary, but internal reports showed that most Circassians did not want to leave.

The Zhane population had integrated into Bzhedug, Natukhaj, and Shapsug by the end of the Russo-Circassian War. In the winter of 1859, a Russian campaign destroyed dozens of Bzhedug villages, and Bzhedugs were forced to surrender. By the spring of 1860, the Natukhaj were trapped between the sea and the Adagum military line which forced them to surrender. In October 1863, the Shapsugs surrendered after a winter campaign destroyed hundreds of their villages. These events resulted in the Circassian genocide, and during the forced expulsion to the Ottoman Empire, the population suffered heavy losses from epidemics, famine, and shipwrecks.

On May 21, 1864, at 11:00 AM, Grand Duke Mikhail Nikolaevich Romanov congratulated the Russian troops at the Qbaada meadow on the completion of the Caucasian War. This ceremony included a religious service followed by a military parade, establishing May 21, 1864, as the official end date of the war. However, armed conflicts and resistance movements continued after this official declaration.

== Geography ==
At its peak, the Zhane Principality was stretching from the Taman Peninsula to the Kerch Strait in the west, which bordered Crimea. To the north, the right bank of the Kuban River and the eastern coast of the Sea of Azov. To the south, the Black Sea coast from Novorossiysk to the mouth of the Nebug or Agoy rivers near Tuapse. To the east, the Abin River in the Kuban basin and the Antkhir and Khabl rivers in the plains, where it bordered the Hatuqay Principality. To the west along the coast and plains, the Zhane bordered the Kheghache Principality, which centered around the Anapa region and the Chekhuray basin. Further south along the Black Sea coast, around modern-day Arkhipo-Osipovka, was inhabited by the Chopsin Principality.

Prince Selim recounted a family tradition; in a remote period, while the Zaneqo family (one of the three prince families of Kheghache) lived in Chemguy, the Zhane princes owned a large part of Northern Natukhaj, while the Shapsug lands belonged to the Basteqo family, princes of Chopsin. The coastal boundary between the Zhane and Kheghache was between Anapa and the Bay of Tsemes, with the Atakum River basin marking the westernmost plain boundary of the Zhane.

Ottoman administrative documents from the early 16th century record the Zhane as the "Zan community" (Cemâ’at-i Zanî) in 1529 and "Zhane Beys" (Jana-Beği) in 1539. Western cartographic records reflected the specialized administrative status of the region's rulers during this period. Giacomo Gastaldo's map of 1551 applies the specific title of Cherkeze bano (Circassian Ban) to the ruler governing the Zhane lands.

The geographic and political administration of the territory was organized into two distinct jurisdictions within the 16th century Ottoman administrative hierarchy, recorded as Greater Zhane (Cana-i-Kebîr) and Lesser Zhane (Cana-i-Sağîr). The Lesser Zhane region was part of the Zhane territory. Circassians referred to the Lesser Zhane as the Mountain Zhane (Adyghe: Къушъхьэ Жанэ), using the term to distinguish them from the Greater Zhane who lived in the plains. Greater Zhane was referred as Adyghe Zhane (Adyghe: Адыгэ Жанэ). Mount Khitybyt (identified with Mount Tkhab in the Ketsekhur range) separated the Zhane plains in the Kuban basin from their Black Sea coastal lands.

According to local oral traditions, by the 17th century, the Zhane inhabited the lower basin of the Psekups River, extending to the left bank of the Kuban River. The territory bordered nomadic steppe groups to the north and Abazins to the east. Mountain passes to the south were inhabited by communities of Circassian "fugitives", while the Shapsugs and Natukhajs formed the western border. Local river courses marked internal boundaries with neighboring Circassian groups. The Cherchenay, a subgroup of the Bzhedug, inhabited the upper and middle reaches of the Psekups River down to the Chigiyako Stream. The core residential area of the Zhane extended south from the Chigiyako Stream toward the confluence with the Kuban River. The relocation of the Ademiy village, belonging to the Chemguy, to the right bank of the Belaya River established a direct border between the Ademiy and the Zhane in the lower Psekups and Belaya basins.

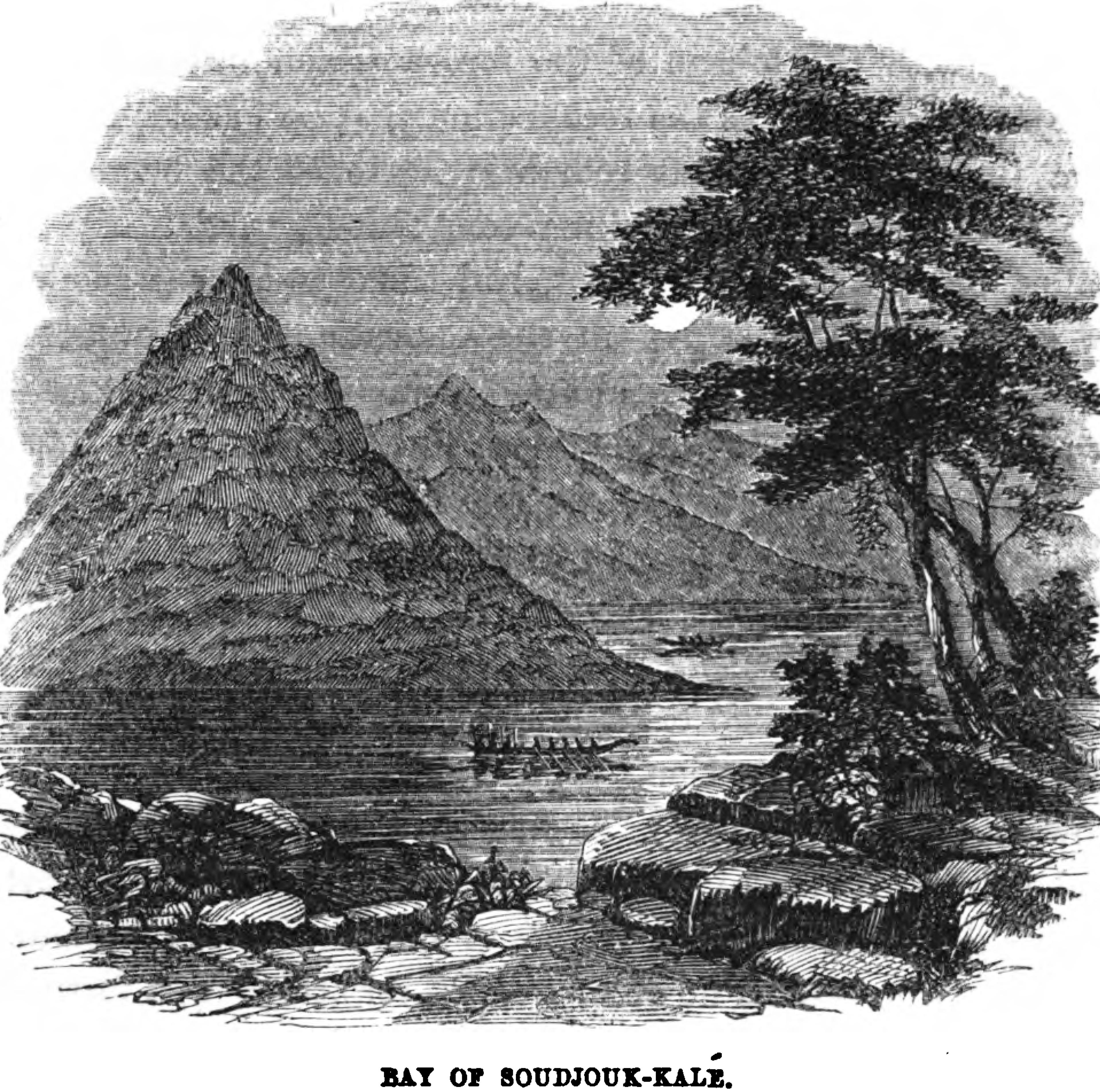
Bay of Sujuk-Kale

Zhane territory included the Taman Peninsula, the right bank of the Kuban River north of Kopyl (Adyghe: Къопыл) up to the Protoka mouth, and a large part of Western Transkuban. Along the Black Sea coast, they ruled a wide area stretching from Novorossiysk (Sujuk-Kale) to Tuapse. In 1640, Ottoman traveler Evliya Çelebi personally recorded that Zhane lands began just north of Tuapse. According to the records of Evliya Çelebi in 1666, Greater Zhane was bounded by the Hayku mountains to the south and extended eastward to the Atakum and Setaze rivers. Lesser Zhane was situated within the drainage basin of the Abin, Habil, Yil, and Aburgan rivers that flowed from the Obur mountains into the Kuban River.

Etymological and geographical connections were noted in 1740 by an anonymous Ottoman author, who recorded an assessment that the name of the settlement of Dzhankoi in Crimea translated literally as "Zhan-village" (Jan-köy), linking it to the historical migrations or vassal status of the Zhane population.

== Governance ==
The administrative system consisted of four main levels: the first level represented the entirety of Circassian lands as a general political entity. The second level comprised large feudal principalities including Zhane. The third level consisted of smaller administrative units which were subdivisions of the principalities. The fourth level of local governance included villages and neighborhoods managed by their feudal owners.

The administrative structure of Western Circassian principalities, including the Zhane, was established as a systematic and balanced aristocratic governance system where power was institutionally shared despite feudal fragmentation. This administration operated through the interaction of three central bodies: the Grand Prince (Pshishkho, Пщышхо), who served as the head of executive and military power; the Grand Council (Khaseshkho, Хасэшхо), which held legislative and advisory functions; and the High Court (Khiye, Хые), functioning as the ultimate judicial authority. This tripartite structure organized the internal affairs of these principalities, while acting as a mechanism of checks and balances that prevented arbitrary rule and protected the rights of different social classes under the limitation of Adyghe Khabze norms.

The executive branch was led by the Grand Prince, who held the highest political authority, as the supreme landowner and the commander-in-chief of the military forces during wartime. The Grand Prince maintained the status of "first among equals" (primus inter pares) rather than an absolute monarch, and his authority was strictly dependent on keeping the legal order. The Grand Prince was elected for life by the Grand Council from among the princely lineages based on seniority, with succession following a horizontal line from the eldest brother to the next youngest brother, where the eldest living prince took the title of Pshi-Thamate. The Grand Prince managed executive affairs, represented the principality in foreign relations, dispatched and received embassies, oversaw the collection of central customs duties and trade tariffs, and held the power to appoint judges and resolve social conflicts. The Grand Council was not a permanent institution and convened only when called by the Grand Prince during times of need.

The legislative and territorial administration relied on family patrimonial properties, fief units, and the Council. Land tenure followed a hierarchical model where a single plot of land carried overlapping rights held simultaneously by the cultivating community, the local unit leader, and the Grand Prince. The power of Grand Prince was also sustained through the control of external trade and shares from wartime spoils. The second highest official in the administrative hierarchy after the Grand Prince was the Qodz (Adyghe: Къодз). The Qodz served as the primary assistant to the Grand Prince in domestic policy, foreign policy, military affairs, and judicial matters. They would manage the bureaucratic apparatus, directly oversee the small council, the army, the courts, and diplomatic embassies. The position of Qodz was typically selected from the Tlekotlesh, which was the first rank of the nobility.

Princes used an executive enforcement body to carry out judicial decisions and maintain public order. These enforcers executed disciplinary rulings and collected property fines for violations of customary law. Because seizing property was considered dishonorable for the free classes, they were recruited from dependent peasants or serfs. This enforcement duty gave them a low status within the social hierarchy.

An exception to the local legal system was among the westernmost Zhane in the Taman region. This border group became part of the Ottoman administrative system in the late 17th century. They used Ottoman legal authority and Sharia, and the Ottoman Empire sent a qadi to their district. This legal system applied only to the Taman border area and did not exist in the main Zhane principality.

== Foreign relations ==
=== Relations with the Ottoman Empire ===
First contacts between the Ottoman Empire and the Zhane began with the capture of Caffa in 1475 and Copa in 1479. Between the 16th and 19th centuries, the ties balanced nominal administrative incorporation with broad local autonomy. In the 16th century, Ottoman authorities registered Zhane lands as a sanjak and appointed local princes as sanjak-beys. The Ottomans preferred to rule through established elites rather than replacing regional institutions.

While the Circassians referred to their princes as "pshi," the Ottoman administration incorporated these local leaders into its diplomatic terminology by using the titles "bey" or sometimes "mirza," with the "bey" specifically used in official correspondence.

In the late 17th century, the Circassians in the Taman border region had Ottoman judges applying Islamic law, which legally banned their enslavement. However, the main Zhane population in the interior remained outside this system. By the late 17th century, the Ottoman Empire was granting long-term tax exemptions to the Circassians in Taman because the area was a border region. The purpose of these exemptions was to secure their support.

The Zhane rulers retained their autonomy, as Ottoman garrison influence remained confined to fortresses. Princes formed independent alliances with the Ottoman Empire or Russia and occasionally staged uprisings against regional Ottoman forces. During the Russo-Circassian War, Zhane leaders joined the Ottoman defense network around Anapa Fortress. These institutional ties ended in the early 19th century due to the decline of Ottoman influence and the destruction of the Zhane population.

=== Relations with the Crimean Khanate ===
Between the late 15th and late 18th centuries, the Zhane Principality had relations with the Crimean Khanate through vassalage and atalyk ties. Crimean sultans were frequently sent to Circassia through the fosterage (atalyk) system, with the Zhane serving as one of the primary host. This practice allowed the Circassian aristocracy to build networks and exert influence within the Crimean administration. The Khanate lacked a permanent local administration, and frequent dynastic successions in Crimea created gaps in authority. The Zhane allegiance depended on military pressure and periodic tributes rather than direct Crimean governance. The Zhane retained internal autonomy and preserved their local rulers. The political connection ended with the Russian annexation of Crimea in 1783.

In his 1595 work Tartariae Descriptio, Polish diplomat Martin Broniewski recorded observations from his 1570s visits to the Crimean Khanate. He categorized the Circassians connected to the Khanate as either allies or tributaries. Local Circassian leaders retained authority over their populations rather than submitting to Crimea. A section of the Circassian nobility formed part of the Khan's inner court, received annual salary and gifts. Circassians served in Crimean campaigns either as paid serviceman or as autonomous allies.

According to W.E.D. Allen, the Giray dynasty frequently married Circassian women, with women from the Zhane being particularly common in these marriages. In 1666, Evliya Çelebi wrote that the mother of Salamat Giray Sultan was from the Zhane nobility. One of Selim I Giray's wife was from either Zhane or Hatuqay. By 1736 and 1737, the daughter of Zhane Prince Ilkas Bey was married to Crimean Prince Sultan Ahmed.

==== The institution of atalyk ====
The atalyk institution was a fundamental social and political system in the North Caucasus which created ties between the Crimean Khanate and Circassian princes. The word atalyk is a Turkish word meaning a person who takes the place of a father. Male children were sent to another family from infancy to receive education in horsemanship, military arts, traditional ethics, and social etiquette. This practice established non-biological kinship ties between families, often resulting in children forming deeper emotional connections with their atalyks than with their biological parents.

For the Giray dynasty, the custom was raising most of their princes in Circassia from infancy. The Crimean prince would learn horsemanship, archery, swordsmanship, military arts, Circassian language, culture, court etiquette, and military manners, establishing close ties with the local population. When facing succession struggles or political rivalries in Crimea, these princes would sought refuge and military support from the people of their atalyks. For Circassian princes, hosting and educating a Crimean prince was a sign of accepting the Khan's protection while increasing the host prince's political power. It was a exempting the host prince's lands from Crimean military raids. Circassians called these children delivered for education "qan" (Adyghe: къан) from Turkish, or "pur" (Adyghe: къан) meaning "raised" in Circassian. The princes stayed there until they reached adolescence or, in some cases, grew beards. The descendants of the Crimean dynasty in Western Circassia formed a noble class known as the Khanuqo (Adyghe: Хъаныкъо), meaning "sons of Khan."

The Zhane region was one of the primary atalyk centers for the Giray dynasty, after Besleneys. In 1562, Zhane Prince Sibequ and Besleney princes raised two sons of the Crimean Khan as atalyks. In 1563, Crimean Khan Devlet I Giray appointed Safa Giray as the administrative official over the Zhane following their request, because of the atalyk bond. Between 1637 and 1641, Khan Bahadır Giray I sent his son to Zhane Prince Antonuq. In the 19th century, Sultan Inat-Giray (father of the author Sultan Krym-Giray Inatov) was living among the Zhane.

The atalyk system was also a widespread custom practiced among the Circassians themselves. In noble families, children were generally not raised by their biological parents.

=== Relations with Russia ===
In the mid-1550s, the Zhane allied with Russia against Crimean and Ottoman pressure, helping capture Ottoman fortresses on the Taman Peninsula and fighting in the Livonian War. However, this alliance ended completely in the early 1560s, and the Zhane never entered alliance with Russia again.

During the Russo-Circassian War, systematic attacks by the Russian army eventually destroyed the principality, while the Zhane leadership maintained active armed resistance against Russian forces throughout the conflict.

=== Relations with other Circassians ===
Although the Circassian geography lacked a single administrative structure, independent principalities made coordinated decisions regarding foreign policy and external influences. The borders between sub-ethnic regions and principalities in Circassia remained open and porous. Political fragmentation was balanced by a shared language and the traditional oral law known as Adyghe Khabze.

The Zhane generally acted together with other Circassians, either forming coalitions against the Crimean Khanate or joining military campaigns alongside them under Crimean and Ottoman influence. The Zhane princes formed alliances with other Circassian princes through marriage. According to Sultan Khan-Giray, the Zhane were among the dominant political and military forces in Circassia. The principality maintained a large population and military capacity that influenced surrounding regions and maintained authority over the Kheghache principality. Throughout the Russo-Circassian War, the Zhane maintained resistance and diplomatic partnerships in coordination with other Circassian groups.

=== Relations with the Genoese ===
Relations between the Genoese and the Zhane, centered around Copa, were based on trade and economic interdependence (along the other Circassians). The Genoese administration in Caffa appointed an annual consul to Copa during the fishing season to regulate fish prices and secure commercial interests, while paying a yearly tribute called exenia to the Zikh princes for trade access. This relationship relied primarily on trade and included military cooperation such as mercenary recruitment. Conflicts of authority, such as Prince Berzebuk constructing a stone fortress despite Genoese opposition, led to periodic trade embargoes and tensions. This commercial relationship ended permanently in 1475 when the Ottoman Empire captured Caffa and subsequently Copa.

Following the Ottoman conquest of Genoese colonies in the Black Sea in 1475, Genoese aristocrats married to Circassian princesses settled in Circassia. This led to the emergence of a group known as the "Circassian-Franks", particularly in and around the Taman Peninsula. They adopted Circassian culture, language, and customs. The Circassians referred to both the Genoese and this population as "Ferenzh" (Adyghe: Фэрэндж) or "Dzhenywuz" (Adyghe: Джэныуз). They were documented by observers such as Emiddio Dortelli d'Ascoli until the 17th century, after which they assimilated into the Circassian population due to their small numbers.

== Economy ==
The economy was based on livestock breeding, horse breeding, agriculture, and the slave trade, supported by trade ports. Alongside these primary sectors, regional production included domestic textile weaving, metallurgy, weapon manufacturing, leatherworking, boat building, timber processing, fishing, caviar production, mining, and gunpowder manufacturing.

=== Agriculture ===
The Greater Zhane lands were located in the Western Trans-Kuban plain. This plain was exposed to nomadic raids, which impacted agriculture and limited activities like horticulture and winemaking compared to mountainous areas. Local fields produced millet, wheat, barley, and emmer, with millet serving as the main local food source while wheat was grown for export to Genoese and Venetian merchants. The region's soil is fertile and has high crop yields. Evliya Çelebi recorded that large plain villages moved frequently due to security concerns which prevented the establishment of permanent orchards.

Interiano who visited north of Copa around 1500 stated that agricultural production focused on millet and grain, and the economic condition of the farmers was poor. Gold and silver cups were used during ceremonies.

By July 25 1653, the Zhane community had established a permanent agricultural settlement in the Taman region. They held a total of 371 sapan units of land, with each sapan consisting of 50 dunams, totaling 18,550 dunams of agricultural land. The Zhane paid the required title deed fees to the state to formalize their land tenure and integrate into the Ottoman land system. They also acquired salt from the Adahun saltworks.

=== Livestock ===
Livestock breeding and horse breeding formed the primary economic activities for the people living on the Zhane plains. They raised herds of sheep, goats, and cattle alongside their horses. In 1711, diplomat Aubry de la Motraye observed that the local diet included sheep milk and foods prepared with cumin flour, which shows the reliance on pastoral resources. In 17th century Ottoman documents, the Zhane in the Taman region primarily engaged in livestock breeding, maintaining herds of horses, goats, sheep, cows, and oxen.

==== Bechqan horse ====
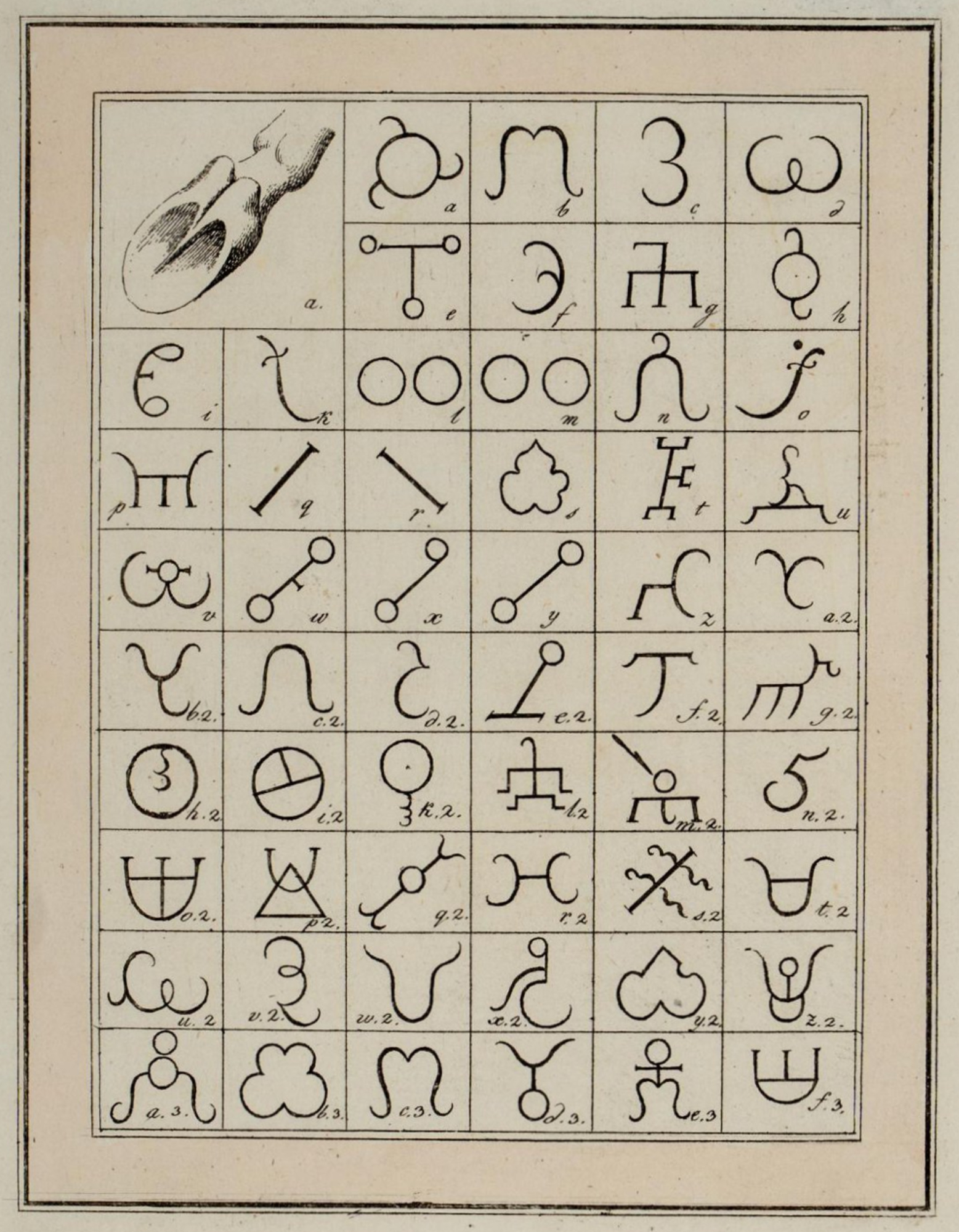
Circassian and Abaza tamgas by Pallas, which features the Bechqan tamga in the second column of the third row.

The Bechqan house was the ruling family that bred the elite Bechqan horse breed. These horses were noted for their green-tinted coats, long manes, tails, and limbs, as well as their stamina and physical presence. The tamga, which was the ownership mark of this horse breed, was a sword figure with a hilt stamped on the left hip of the animal. Between 1750 and 1762, Charles de Peyssonnel documented this breed under the name "Bekkan", which corresponds to its coastal Circassian dialectal form "Бэкыкъан", and listed it alongside "Soluk" (Sholokh) as one of the most prominent horse breeds in Circassia and noted that these Circassian horses were exported to the Crimea for up to 200 piastres, with elite breeds for up to 8 slaves.

=== Slave trade ===
Due to the location of Circassia, the regional war economy led to a high demand for captives. Circassians captured and sold prisoners from campaigns and battles, which formed the basis of the local slave trade. This trade created a commercial activity for Circassian nobility, with their acting as direct suppliers of captives to external markets such as the Ottoman Empire and Crimea.

During the 16th and 17th centuries, campaigns by the Crimean Khanate led to widespread enslavement across the Zhane plains. The Ottoman administration later prohibited the enslavement of the westernmost Zhane branches settled within the Taman region due to their legal integration; however, this protection was strictly localized. The main Zhane population in the interior plains remained subject to slave-taking.

=== Ports ===
During the 14th and 15th centuries, Genoese colonies like Caffa and Tana established economic connections between Italian merchants and Circassians, with Matrega (Taman) which was the land of Hytuk Circassians, functioning as a primary trading post. Taman developed into a commercial center that funneled goods from the port into the Circassian interior. Taman was located within the Zhane territory and it was the primary transit and trade center for all of Western Circassia. The trade network handled livestock, raw materials, textiles, and slaves. Slaves captured by Crimean Tatars or sold by local nobility passed through Taman toward markets in Ottoman territories and the Middle East. The location was called the Taman Pier, and a 1542 law regulated taxes on trade goods like horses and caviar. To the south, Kiziltash Port was a strategic spot connected to a nearby salt lake and the Kiziltash Fortress. In the sea between Taman and Kerch, the waters around Oturlec Island served as a major center for catching and exporting fish by ships.

Around 1740, the Zhane princes were responsible for ensuring the supply of grain required by the Azak Fortress. While the town of Zhane served as the political center, Temryuk was the production hub where Muslim Circassians engaged in fishing and trade. The local economy in Temryuk focused particularly on the processing and export of caviar and leather.

By the 17th and 18th centuries, exports included wool, Circassian coats, cloaks, animal hides, furs, wax, honey, horses, and slaves sent to Istanbul and Caffa. Imports coming through Taman into the interior included European and Ottoman textiles, metals, firearms, gunpowder, tools, spices, and paper. Inside Circassia, trade functioned largely through bartering, using cattle or cloth pieces as units of value, whereas foreign currencies circulated at the port itself. Monetary practice included the usage of a local currency (kara akçe), recorded in 1587 reports as being minted under legal decrees and valued at four to one Ottoman akçe. Custom duties collected at the port were divided between Ottoman officials and the Crimean Khanate.

Anapa was located in the south of Taman Peninsula and it was within the territories of the Kheghache Principality, as a major commercial port and a direct maritime terminal connecting the region with Istanbul and Anatolian ports. The Ottoman settlement of Adahun, which was also a fortress, served as a port and was controlling the gulfs of the peninsula and monitor local trade.

=== Merchants ===
The merchant class in Circassia was composed primarily of Cherkesogai who migrated from Crimea between the 15th and 18th centuries following the Ottoman conquest. Traditional Circassian norms viewed trade as a job dishonorable for nobles, besides selling war spoils, which prevented the development of a local merchant class. Armenian traders filled this economic position, adopted culture and customs while retaining Christianity. Some of them were granted noble status within principalities which allowed them to own land and hold Circassian serfs. Foreign merchants, as mostly Armenians, required local sponsors to conduct business safely in the interior.

== Military ==
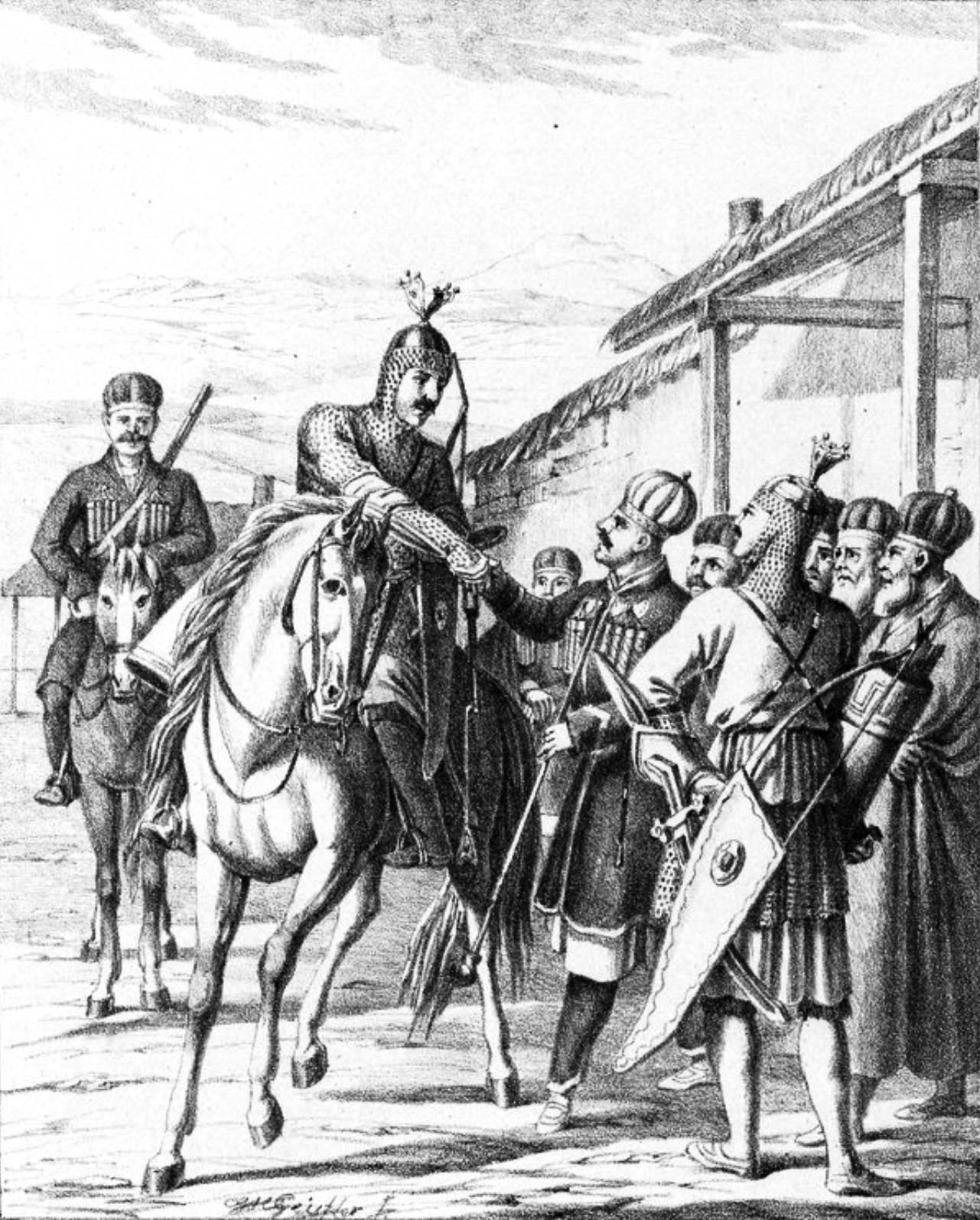
"Noble Circassians at the foot of the Caucasus" by Christian Gottfried Geißler.

In 1540s, during the reign of Prince Qanshawuq, the Zhane had a force of 15,000 soldiers. In 1558, the Zhane and Besleney princes jointly deployed a force of 5,000 soldiers to the Livonian War. In 1666, traveler Evliya Çelebi recorded that the Greater Zhane had 10,000 soldiers, while the Lesser Zhane maintained 3,000 soldiers, bringing the total force to 13,000 men. By the late 18th century, following a decline in the population, Prince Mishawost was able to mobilize a detachment of 200 armed men.

The Zhane were widely recognized in Circassia for their military readiness. One narrative describes warriors rushing into battle with half-shaved heads upon hearing the sounds of combat.

=== Organization ===
Military organization in Circassian principalities relied on feudal loyalty and social hierarchy. Following a war decision, the council elected a commander-in-chief, usually the Grand Prince, to enforce discipline and lead the army, while mounted messengers summoned vassal lords to mobilize their vassals. Before deployment, units underwent equipment and logistics inspections with census and took a formal oath. The core strike force consisted of armored noble heavy cavalry, supported by light cavalry of lower-ranking nobles and free peasants, while dependent commoners served as auxiliary infantry only during mass mobilizations. Field operations were supported by other units such as the rearguard commander, discipline officers, mounted scouts, spies, guards, tree lookouts, horse-raiding experts as well as bards and healers. Each unit carried the banner of its respective lord, while the army marched under the standard of the commander-in-chief.

=== Equipment ===
The noble cavalry wore lightweight chainmail, weighing between 3.5 to 5 kilograms, along with plate-reinforced armor, helmets, arm guards, and circular shields. Attack weapons centered on the unique Circassian sword, designed with an armor-piercing tip, alongside lances, axes and bows. While firearms became widespread from the 16th century onward alongside the ergonomic Circassian saddle, high-quality Circassian chainmail could still stop smoothbore musket balls at a distance. Over time, heavy plate armors and shields were phased out as mobility was prioritized.

=== Combat style ===
Circassian combat style combined chivalric honor codes with highly flexible cavalry and ambush tactics. Noble warriors were strict to the unwritten chivalric "Noble Law." Battles often opened with noble duels, where Circassian lords granted opponents the first strike under strict rules of customary honor. In major engagements, nobles led frontal assaults, advancing in loose formations to minimize artillery losses before rapidly converging at impact to fire a single volley and close in with swords. Cavalry employed feigned retreats against steppe nomads to lure pursuers into infantry ambushes or counter-attacks, while also using night spear raids, riverbed traps, and forested passes to neutralize enemy artillery. Encircled warriors strictly abided by customary prohibitions against surrender, often slaughtering their own horses to fight to the death, and bound themselves by mutual oaths never to leave a wounded or fallen comrade behind on the battlefield.

Circassian principalities usually used adaptable defensive structures instead of permanent stone castles, centered around fortified settlements known as pshichew (Adyghe: пщычэу, lit. 'fence of the prince') or pshikew in coastal dialects. The outer boundary of these settlements had deep trenches to disrupt cavalry movement, earthen ramparts to absorb strikes, and thick log fences that provided a barrier against attacks. Residents consisted of lightweight plastered wattle were defense elements that communities dismantled for rapid evacuation into forests or mountains. These homes stood in a continuous circular configuration that functioned as an outer protective wall against steppe cavalry which created a secure central courtyard to safeguard livestock and civilians during raids. This layered defensive architecture was a response to borderland warfare, and hiding behind stone walls was viewed within Circassian martial culture as a sign of cowardice.

== Society ==
=== Adyghe Khabze ===
Adyghe Khabze was an oral code of ethics and behavior that regulated social relations independently of religious beliefs. Originating in the early Middle Ages, this code formed a moral foundation called Adyghaghe (Circassianity) built on five pillars: humanity, dignity, reason, courage, and honor. It governed family relations, hospitality, and social etiquette, serving as a shared cultural identifier across the community. Different social classes adapted these rules to their status, such as the nobility following a specific knightly code (worq khabze). In the aristocratic communities, Adyghe Khabze functioned as a highly institutionalized system of feudal customary law.

=== Social structure ===
The social structure of Circassian principalities was a strict hierarchy based on family lineage, customary law, and land ownership. An individual's status, rights, and obligations were usually determined by birth into specific closed classes. The community was divided into five main social tiers: the nobility, feqotl (free peasants), pshitl (serfs), and wuna'ut (slaves).

- The aristocratic class of Circassian principalities was divided into the pshi (princes) and the worq (nobles). The princes formed the highest tier, held privileges, absolute legal immunity, the being the commander-in-chief in wartime and the sole authority to declare war and sign treaties. Directly beneath them, the noble class was the primary military force, divided into specific ranks based on land rights and vassal relationships established through symbolic gifts.
- The feqotl (Adyghe: фэкъолI) formed the majority of the population and it the free class engaged in agriculture, livestock breeding, and trade, which sustained the economy. They held the right to carry weapons and join the military during wartime. Members of this class could attain lower-noble titles through bravery on the battlefield, and some achieved greater wealth than many nobles through commercial success.
- The pshitl (Adyghe: пщылI) were dependent peasants who worked the land under the protection and authority of a prince, forming the foundation of the feudal economy. A prince's economic and political power was measured by the number of dependent pshitl households rather than the size of his land. Under Khabze rules, this dependency was milder than European serfdom which ensured respect for their personal honor and granting them the right to move to other communities if there was a conflict with their master.
- The wuna'ut (Adyghe: унэIут) was the slave class, consisting of prisoners of war who lacked the right to carry weapons. While they were considered the property of their masters and used for domestic tasks, Khabze rules required that they be addressed by their names and prohibited the use of insulting nicknames, making severe abuse rare in the community. Social rules protected this slaves from the cruelty of their masters. Once purchased, they actually gained rights to property and safety.

=== Nobility ===
The aristocratic structure of Circassian principalities, including the Zhane, was a strict hierarchy. It was based on family lineage, customary law, and land ownership. The ruling elite kept their status through special legal privileges. They used strict marriage rules to keep bloodlines within their own classes. This social system managed the distribution of land and wartime spoils. It also formed the basis of military organization by balancing independent landowners with dependent vassals. The Circassian nobility was obligated to follow the Worq Khabze (Adyghe: Оркъ Хабзэ, lit. 'Noble Law'), the knightly code of the nobility.

==== Princes (Pshi) ====
The pshi (prince) class formed the highest aristocratic tier in Circassian principalities. They held exclusive judicial and administrative privileges. Princes protected the lands under their patronage. They also held the sole authority to declare war and sign treaties. The title was hereditary but passed only to children from equal marriages. Children from commoner mothers lost full inheritance rights. Authority of a prince depended on his bravery in battle, his eloquence, and his generosity. Princes were required to protect their subjects from outsider threats. A prince who failed to provide protection could lose his subjects to different regions led by other princes or nobles.

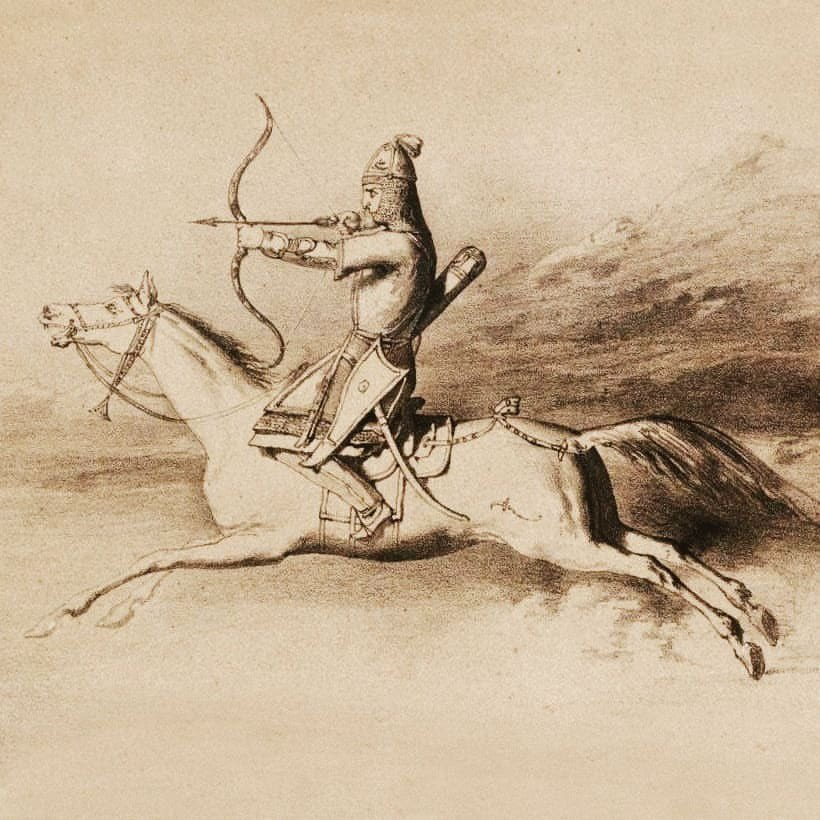
Circassian prince mounted on a Bechqan breed horse.

There are different theories regarding the origins of the Zhane princes, primarily centering on whether or not they descended from Inal. The genealogical division of the ruling elite, particularly those documented by the 19th-century ethnographer Sultan Khan-Giray, identify the Komeo (Qomewo, Къомео) and the Bechkan (Bechqan, Бэчкъан) as the two primary prince houses and sovereign lineages governing the Zhane. The division of the Zhane political structure into Greater and Lesser Zhane over time suggests that these two families originated as branches from a single lineage. Prince Palavandov, a Russian administrative official in 19th century, alternatively recorded the Qomewo family under the name "Komokh".

The Bechqan house was the ruling family that bred the Bechqan horse breed, a breed considered one of the best in Circassia.

The authority of the Zhane princes extended over Kheghache Principality, whose people lived under Zhane protection. The Kheghache Principality coordinated almost all military and political movements with the Zhane princes, who functioned as a higher authority that ensured their security and represented them in foreign relations. According to Khan-Giray, the Zaneqo house, one of the three princely houses of the Principality of Kheghache, is descended from a branch of the Zhane princes.

Russian records use the title "brother-in-law of the Tsar" for Alexander, son of 16th century Zhane prince Sibequ. This title belonged to Mikhail (Sultanqul) because his sister Maria Temryukovna was the wife of Ivan IV. The use of this title for the son of Sibequ is being explained by the marital ties between the Kabardian and Zhane princes. Even when Alexander switched sides and joined Sweden in 1573, Russian records continued to identify him as the Tsar's brother-in-law. Russian records present this relationship through the marital ties, while historian Hieronim Grala explains that shared lineage and blood ties form the actual basis of these marriages and titles. In 1557, a Kabardian embassy arrived in Moscow. They called Sibequ and Makhoshoqo their brothers-in-law.

==== Nobles (Worq) ====
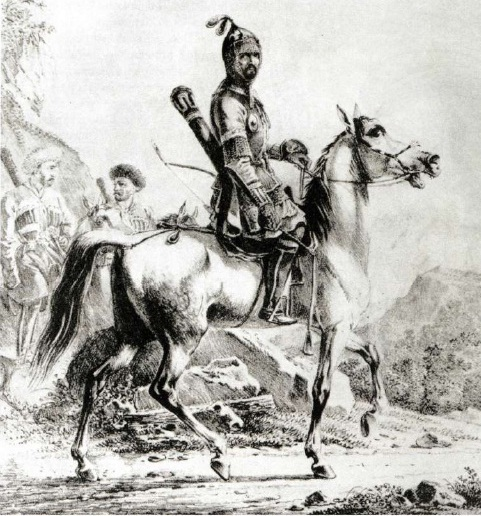
A Circassian knight drawn by Aleksander Orłowski.

The worq (Adyghe: оркъ, lit. 'noble') class was beneath the princes. They formed the primary military force of Circassia. This group was divided into specific ranks based on land rights, control over settlements and their exact relationship with the ruling local prince. Nobles also did not marry free peasants to keep their lineage pure. They followed their specific prince or noble during wartime under a system of mutual loyalty and protection. They served as elite units and fought as armored cavalry.

===== Tleqotlesh =====
The tlekotlesh (Adyghe: лIэкъолъэш, lit. 'powerful lineage') class was the highest rank within the noble class and closest to the prince class. They had near-total independence from the ruling princes. They lived on their own lands in villages named after their families. They did not owe personal or domestic service to the prince. Their only duty was to join military campaigns with their own forces.

===== Tijinigho =====
The tijinigho (Adyghe: тыжьыныгъо, lit. 'gilded silver') class also lived in independent properties away from the prince. Unlike the tlekotlesh, this class was not completely closed, and it was possible to enter this status later. A noble reached this rank after creating a separate cavalry unit of lower-level soldiers.

===== Beslan-Worq =====
The beslan-worq (Adyghe: беслъэн-оркъ, lit. 'knight of Beslan') or the pshi-worq (Adyghe: пщы-оркъ, lit. 'knight of the prince') class was directly dependent on the princes and formed their closest military retinue. Honorary duties like being the standard-bearer were usually given to members of this class, and these positions were hereditary.

===== Shawotlighus =====
The shawotlighus (Adyghe: шъаолIыгъус, lit. 'young comrade') or the worq-shawotlighuse (Adyghe: оркъ-шъаолIыгъусэ, lit. 'young comrade of the noble') class served higher nobles like the tleqotlesh or tijinigho instead of the prince. These landless nobles did not own villages and lived on the estates of their lords. They formed the core of the nobles' military units. The structure was strict but allowed wealthy free peasants to enter the noble hierarchy.

===== Pshichew =====
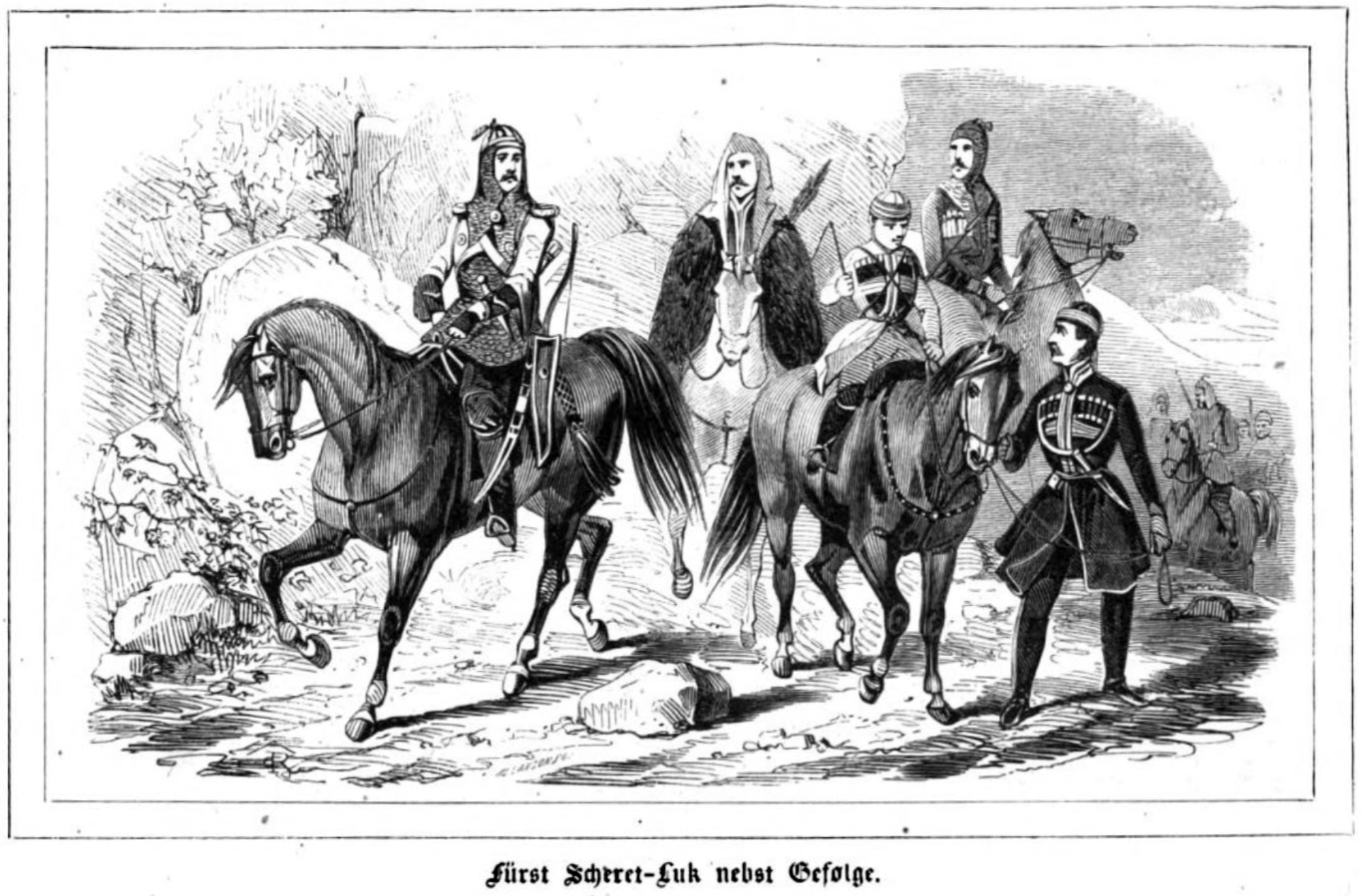
Circassian prince and his retinue

The pshichew (Adyghe: пщычэу, lit. 'fence of the prince') class was the lowest noble rank and they were directly dependent on the princes. They formed a transitional class between the nobility and free peasants. Their duties included serving as the prince's personal guardians and armor-bearers. During campaigns, they performed tasks such as holding the prince's horse, carrying his cloak, and preparing meals.

=== Folklore ===
Among the Circassians, folklore was a system of practices that regulated social relationships and organized daily life. In the absence of written literature, social rules, rituals, games, and ceremonies were transmitted to subsequent generations through oral traditions managed by specific actors. The backbone of this worldview was formed by the Nart Sagas, which originated in the early Bronze Age and shared typological similarities with ancient epic traditions like the Sumerian Epic of Gilgamesh. The sagas consisted of nearly one hundred core plots and cycles centered around heroic figures. Rather than serving purely as mythological stories, these epics functioned as an educational medium to transmit ethical codes, concepts of valor, and societal rules to younger generations.

Celebrations and rituals were directed by specific actors who managed traditional practices, including calendar festivals, lifecycle events, military games, and healing ceremonies. The hatiyako (Adyghe: хьатиякIо) was the master of ceremonies who managed dance circles and organized acrobatic displays under mandatory rules. Masked actors called acheghashu (Adyghe: ачъэгъашъу) acted as clowns and performed pantomime and comedic shows to symbolize abundance during public and family gatherings.

The djeguako (Adyghe: джэгуакIо) were bards, musicians and oral historians who performed heroic epics and war songs with stringed instruments for gifts. They routinely operated in small professional groups of three to seven members that included musicians, dancers, poets, and actors capable of multi-role performances. These performers held high social prestige and absolute immunity under customary law, allowing them to travel unarmed during wars and openly criticize or satirize powerful ruling princes in their songs without retaliation. They accompanied the army to boost morale during campaigns, observed the battlefield from safe locations, and composed songs on the spot to preserve the acts of valor performed during combat.

==== Qeyt ====
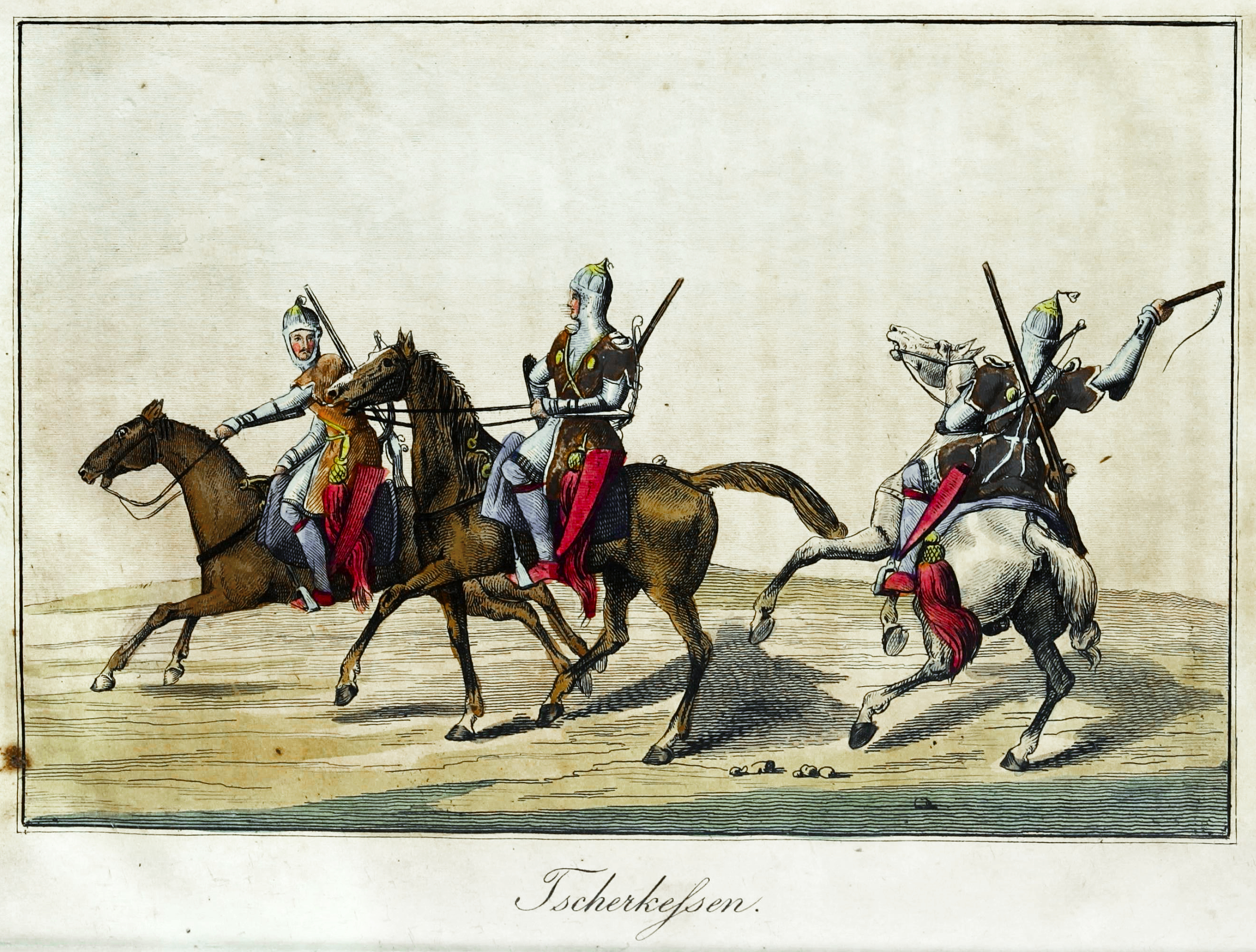
Circassians drawn by Karl Friedrich Vollrath Hoffmann.

In the oral sources compiled by Khan Giray and Dubrovin, a Zhane nobleman named "Kait" (Qeyt) (Adyghe: Къет) was known for his bravery, pride, and riding skills. After returning from a raid, a woman asked him with a smile whether Qeyt, like two specific famous brother princes, could survive only on military rations. Seeking to demonstrate his endurance, Qeyt set out at night to locate the two princes. Despite a long journey across dangerous territory, Qeyt reached the house where the princes were located. Two hunting dogs attacked him upon his arrival and bit his legs, yet Qeyt showed no reaction and continued walking without showing the pain. The host's daughter informed the princes that a strange stranger had arrived. Impressed by his composure, the princes accepted Qeyt, who became their companion on subsequent expeditions.

During a later battle while being pursued by enemies, both brother princes were dying side by side. Qeyt defended their bodies against the enemy forces, who offered to spare his life and allow him to return home because he belonged to a different principality. Qeyt refused the offer. In a song dedicated to him, Qeyt responded to the princes, who had urged him to flee while dying: "Oh, numerous Zhane! I left everything for you, and shared the military rations with you; now, when you perish, I will share my life!". Qeyt continued fighting beside the bodies of the fallen princes until he was killed in the battle.

==== The Seven Years' War ====
According to oral sources compiled by Sultan Khan-Giray, the Zhane frequently raised Crimean princes in the atalyk system. The Zhane asked the Crimean Khan to appoint one of these princes as the commander-in-chief (serasker) of all Circassians. The Khan refused, which started a seven-year war. When the Zhane ran out of resources, princes and elders rejected surrender and chose a final battle. To prevent retreat, they placed women and children directly in front of the warriors on the battlefield. Old folk songs describe the outcome where the finest Zhane warriors were killed, the fields were soaked with blood, and women and children were trampled under the hooves of Crimeanc horses. Zhane traditions claim a victory, while Khan-Giray state the Crimean Tatars won. Due to heavy losses, the Khan stopped trying to fully conquer the Zhane and accepted a symbolic tribute of one wooden spoon per household. The Zhane accepted this, believing the Khan feared them and settled for a token, but the Khan's actual purpose was to count the spoons to determine the number of households and calculate the military strength of Zhane.

A notable leader during the war was Prince Jambolet. Following the war, internal rivalry weakened the principality further. Jambolet's rival, a prince nicknamed Kanly (meaning "bloody" in Turkish due to his execution of opponents), targeted Jambolet's young associate, Tembolet, whose father had died in a past feud with Jambolet's family. Kanly used actors dressed as ghosts at the father's grave to convince Tembolet that his father's spirit demanded revenge, promising him marriage to Zaira, the daughter of the grand prince of Zhane and the husband of Jambolet. Tembolet stabbed Jambolet to death while he was asleep after a hunt. Upon discovering the deception, Tembolet went to Kanly's house and killed him. Believing a report that her husband had entrusted her to Tembolet before his death, Jambolet's widow, Zaira, married Tembolet. Four years later, Tembolet lost his mind and confessed the murder, and Zaira killed him to avenge her husband.

In the Shapsug oral sources compiled by Dubrovin, a Shapsug song describes the war between the Zhane Principality and Crimean Khanate. After suffering several defeats against the Tatars, the Zhane people learned that the Crimeans were gathering again and decided to either win or die fighting. Every Zhane warrior was required to bring a young child to the battle to prevent retreat while defending them. One specific Zhane warrior did not have a child, so he brought his sister-in-law instead. When his sister-in-law asked what would happen to her if he died, that warrior replied that his body would save her and the people. During the close combat battle, a Tatar killed that specific warrior. As the Tatar tried to capture his sister-in-law, the Tatar's horse slipped on the dead warrior's body, causing the Tatar to fall. The Zhane warriors killed the fallen Tatar and removed his armor, which caused the Zhane forces to advance while the Tatars panicked and retreated in defeat. These events are based on the Zhane oral tradition transmitted among the Shapsugs.

==== Qunchuq ====
The narrative recorded by Sultan Khan-Giray regarding Qunchuq, a Bzhedug (Cherchenay) prince, centers on the abduction of his fiancée, Gul. After an Ottoman pasha from Azov Fortress had her tricked and brought to his harem, Gul resisted him. Qunchuq assembled about one hundred armored cavalrymen, infiltrated Azov, killed the pasha and the guards, and set fire to the city before escaping into the steppe with Gul and captured goods.

While traveling between Azov and the Kuban, Qunchuq halted the group along the banks of the Kuban River to rest. During this pause, a dispute arose between an elderly Shapsug warrior nicknamed "the Wolf" (Tughuzh) and a young Zhane warrior. Tughuzh remained mounted and insisted that enemy forces were pursuing them. The young Zhane warrior mocked his caution and Tughuzh replied back, "Pride has blown your Zhane noses higher than your foreheads, so your eyes cannot see past the end of them!" Qunchuq intervened to stop the argument, after which Tughuzh went to sleep without removing his armor while the young Zhane warrior slept without taking precautions.

At dawn, pursuing Ottoman and Nogai forces launched a surprise attack on the camp and killed many of the raiders, including Tughuzh and the young Zhane warrior. As enemy forces closed in, Qunchuq refused to allow Gul to be captured again. Holding her with one arm, he leapt from a steep cliff on horseback into the waters of the Kuban River, resulting in the drowning of both.

==== Khan Giray's accounts of events from the 19th century ====
According to records by Khan-Girey, in the early 19th century, Zhane prince Pshiquy Chukhoq participated in a conspiracy with the Khimishiy prince Alqas Hajemuqo to murder Alqas's brother, Yaqubequ. Alqas, described as a cruel leader, envied Yaqubequ because his brother was more popular among the people. Under the pretense of helping Yaqubequ abduct a princess for marriage, Alqas and Pshiquy Chukhoq lured him into a trap, where a disguised assassin stabbed Yaqubequ to death. Following the murder, Alqas was condemned by the public, earned the nickname "two-faced" and died in exile.

In 1810s, after Prince Qomewo killed a Bzhedug prince, his relative Prince Netakhoqo delayed paying the blood price, prompting the Bzhedug prince Naghoy to plan an assassination. Naghoy and his brothers later ambushed the unarmed Netakhoqo in a forest. However, Naghoy refused to kill an unarmed elder and escorted him home instead. Following this, Netakhoqo immediately paid the compensations and ended the feud. Qomewo was an influential Zhane prince who was seen as a warrior and led raids. Jealous of his influence, other Zhane princes and relatives conspired against him. They ambushed and captured Qomewo while he was unarmed, performing his evening prayer on his cloak, under the pretext of planning a raid into Shapsug territory. He was taken to a forest for execution by a Bzhedug prince named Naghoy, who held a blood feud against him. A low-ranking warrior shot Qomewo twice in the chest. Before dying, Qomewo mocked his enemies by saying they should have chosen a warrior to kill him, which led Naghoy to deliver the final sword strike. The Zhane people buried him as a martyr, and his grave was believed to have healing properties.

=== Demography ===
By the second half of the 17th century, the combined population of Greater and Lesser Zhane is estimated as approximately 200,000, making it one of the largest ethnopolitical entities within Circassia. In a 1724 report, French consul Xaverio Glavani noted that the Zhane ("Janna") region had 500 households. Around 1740, 300 settlements in Taman peninsula were under the authority of the Zhane prince.

According to Russian records and the Tiflisskiye Vedomosti newspaper, the Zhane population was recorded as 50 households (400 people) in May 1829. According to Russian data collected by the Russian officer Novitsky as an agent from 1830, the Zhane population consisted of 60 households (1,200 people).

According to a statistical table compiled by the Russian General Staff officer Blaramberg in 1834, the Zhane population was recorded as 60 households (600 people), with "Pshikhuye Tsuyukhuk" (Pshiquy Chukhoq) listed as their prince. According to Khan Giray, by the mid-19th century, only "10-20 poor huts" remained of the Zhane population in the Karakuban region.

==== Minorities ====
In the 16th century, Taman Circassians were the majority in Taman which were under the Ottoman jurisdiction. However, in the 17th century, the population was declining. To repopulate the region, Zhane Circassians from the non-controlled inner regions moved, including 371 households settling near Anapa (which belonged to the Kheghache) in 1682 by the Ottomans. In this period, Nogais fleeing Kalmyk pressure also began entering and created a coexistent society of Zhanes, Nogais, and Tatars.

There were Genoese Circassians who preserved their identity until the 17th century and Armenians forming the merchant class were living among Circassians.

=== Language ===
The Zhane dialect (Adyghe: Жанэбзэ) was a coastal dialect of the Adyghe language. Linguistically and geographically, Adyghe dialects are divided into coastal and steppe groups. Coastal dialects preserve the most archaic features of the language, particularly palatalized velar consonants. Steppe dialects (such as Chemguy, Bzhedug and Abzakh) transformed these sounds into dental-palatal affricates. The archaic coastal гь shifted to дж, кь to ч, кӏь to кӏ in the steppe group. For example, the archaic coastal g'ane (гьанэ), meaning "shirt", became dzhane (джанэ) in steppe dialects. Today, Shapsug is the only surviving representative of the coastal dialect group.

=== Religion ===
In the early 16th century, the religious life of the western Circassian regions combined Circassian paganism with Christian practices. Around 1500, Interiano recorded that drinking ceremonies were performed bareheaded and with religious solemnity. children were baptized only at eight years old, and nobles avoided entering churches until age sixty. For deceased nobles, kurgans were being built and the burial rituals included the horse of the deceased. Archaeologist I. V. Volkov found that findings from the Prorvensky 1 settlement and the Cherny Yerik cemeteries matched the burial rituals in Interiano's description. Archaeological sites located between Pshada and Dzhubga on the Black Sea coast, as well as near the Shapsugskaya and Erivanskaya settlements in the Abinsky District of Krasnodar Krai, feature burial mounds linked to the Zhane society. These sites contain shallow grave pits where the deceased were laid in an extended position facing west, accompanied by charcoal within the soil and under the head. In accordance with an older Maeotian custom, some bodies were pierced with a spear to prevent evil spirits from reanimating them.

At first, Western Circassians adopted Islam through its practical, ceremonial, and political aspects, starting with the ruling elite in the 16th century due to growing Ottoman and Golden Horde successor influence. The first official record of Islam within the Zhane princes dates to the 1560s. Islam spread through military and marital ties with the Crimean Khanate, though the Circassians maintained their administrative and military independence.

Daily religious practices of the general population remained superficial for a long time. In 1711, French diplomat Aubry de la Motraye observed that his Zhane guide claimed to be Muslim but wanted to eat wild boar, refraining only out of fear of a devout Nogai guide, and noted that these guides did not perform daily prayers. Islamization accelerated among the Western Circassians during the 18th and 19th-century Russo-Circassian War, making Islam fully established in Circassia by the 1860s. An Ottoman document from 1810 mention a mosque built by a person named Taniy (Adyghe: Таный) in the Zhane village, listed in the Bzhedug region, and its imam as Ali Effendi. Following the exile, Circassians were scattered across the Ottoman Empire, integrating into Muslim environments where the older syncretic traditions fully faded, leaving Islam as their sole religious identity.

== Legacy ==
The remaining Zhane people mixed into the surrounding sub-ethnic groups and lost their identities and dialects during the Russo-Circassian War. Eventually, the Zhane identity shifted from a distinct regional population into a family name, used by families of the Zhane origin.

Georgian academician Simon Janashia visited the Circassians in Caucasus in 1929 and interviewed a Circassian informant who said that according to accounts from his elders, the Zhane were completely destroyed in wars as an independent sub-ethnic group and the Zhane name survived only as a surname.

According to Khan-Giray and Vasily Potto, the Zhane was the most powerful and largest principality in Circassia in the past who were outnumbering other Circassians. They had enough military power to launch raids without reprisal and even the distant Kabardians, who feared the Zhane despite the geographical distance between them. He described the Zhane as distinct among Circassian societies due to their "pride," "fiery character," and "rebellious spirit" with legends of their exploits continued to evoke fear and admiration among later Circassian generations. The Zhane raiders would carry out raids extending to the Don and Volga rivers. Even among the dispersed remnants of the Zhane, traits of "unyielding temperament" and a "martial spirit" persisted. This led him to conclude that other Circassians could not have broken their power on their own, which made everyone to arm against them.

Khan-Giray draws a parallel between the Zhane principality and the Roman Empire. He notes that just as Rome collapsed under its own greatness, the Zhane once dominated the region before disappearing. The Zhane were viewed as symbols of a "classical and glorious" era in Circassian history.

The Zhane lands were filled with mostly Shapsug population over time, however some old ruling noble families maintained their presence within the regional structures. According to a hypothesis proposed by historian Samir Khotko in collaboration with G.K. Chemso, the famous Shapsug military commander Qizbech Tughuzhuqo Sheretluqo directly descended from the Zhane princes. The Sheretluqo house was a first-rank knight in the Shapsug society, where there were no princes. The primary evidence for this connection is in the family's tamga. Qizbech's grandfather, Yelmeshuq, used a sword-shaped tamga that is almost identical to the tamga of the Bechqan, differing only by a small curl on the handle. In Circassian tradition, such minor modifications were specifically added to show a new branch splitting from the same root. According to the hypothesis, during the decline of the principality, its noble elite integrated into the neighboring Shapsug and Natukhaj societies, allowing the Sheretluqo line to retain its aristocratic status and emerge as prominent, high-ranking leaders within their new communities.

Tamgas of Bechqan (left), Sheretluqo (middle) and Yelmishequ (right)

The river Zhane was a tributary of the Mezyb River near modern-day Novomikhaylovka that flows into the Black Sea, derives its name from the Zhane people who inhabited the area until the late 18th century.

== Rulers ==
Prince	Native Name	Reign	Description
Zan / Zhane	Зан / Жанэ	Late middle ages	Descendant of Inal and the ancestor of Zhane princes in tradition.
Barasabiyeqo ("Berzebuk")	Бэрасбиекъо	fl. 1460s–1470s	Managed the feudal estate of Copa and built a stone castle there.
Qambolet ("Kambelot")	Къамболэт	Late 15th century	Son of Barasabiyeqo and possibly the brother of Antonuq.
Antonuq ("Antonon")	Антоныкъу	fl. 1498	Requested military aid from the Crimean Khan during internal power struggles.
Qanshawuq ("Kansavuk")	Къаншъаукъу	fl. 1538–1551	Father of Sibequ. First ruler to accept Ottoman suzerainty; led resistance against Crimean Khan Sahib Giray I.
Sibequ ("Sibok") / Vasily	Сибэкъу	fl. 1555–1563	Son of Qanshawuq. Led a major delegation to Moscow; allied with Russia before later entering Crimean service. Brother of Adzimguq, "Tazdruy," Chukhoq, Dawid and possibly Qanbolet. Possibly from a sub-branch named Anchoq. Father of Qanshawuq and Qudenet (Alexander).
Davud Bey	Даут	fl. 1561–1583	Son of "the bey of Zhane in 1561. o-led the escort of the Ottoman military treasury and units to Derbent in 1583.
Mehmet Bey	Мэхьмэт	fl. 1561–1586	Brother of Davud Bey. Tasked by the Ottomans with the safe transport of the military treasury in 1586.
Mustafa Bey	Мыстафэ	fl. 1564–1571	Sanjak-bey of Zhane under Ottoman administration; resettled subjects in the Taman region.
Akhmet / Chiqoqo	Ахъмэт / КIыкъокъо	fl. 1577–1593	Sanjak-bey who escorted the imperial treasury; later rebelled by seizing a shipwrecked merchant ship.
Musa Bey	Мусэ	fl. 1592–1593	Addressed in Ottoman decrees regarding regional security and banditry.
Qaziy (Casibei)	Къазый	fl. 1625	Two brother princes reported by Giovanni da Lucca to control coastal settlements.
Zaneqoshkho ("Sancascobei")	Занэкъошхо	fl. 1625	Two brother princes reported by Giovanni da Lucca to control coastal settlements.
Zhaneqo ("Djan-ko-bey")	Жанэкъо	fl. 1629	Recorded as the ruler of Zhane.
Hakushmuq	ХьэкушIмыкъу	fl. 1635–1644	Rebellious prince who claimed full independence from Crimea; executed after a long conflict.
Antonuq	Антоныкъу	fl. 1638–1666	Brother of Hakushmuq; became the sole ruler of Greater Zhane with Ottoman/Crimean backing.
Unnamed ruler		fl. 1740	An unnamed ruler who were governing 300 settlements around 1740.
"Imhas Bey"	—	fl. 1780s	Zhane princes recorded in the vicinity of Anapa.
Beshiqoy ("Bashkoy Bey")	Бэщыкъой	fl. 1780s	Zhane princes recorded in the vicinity of Anapa.
Temir ("Timur / Demir Bey")	Темыр	fl. 1784	Ruler whose representatives petitioned the Ottoman Sultan for aid against Russian encroachment.
Mishawost Melichjeriy	Мышъэост Мэлычджэрый	fl. 1787–1794	Relocated the Zhane people during the Russo-Circassian War. Requested direct trade with Istanbul.
"Ilchent Bey"	—	fl. 1792	They signed the official request for merchant ships and recognized Ottoman suzerainty. They took a formal oath of loyalty to the Ottoman Empire alongside other Zhane princes.
Tatarsau ("Tatar Shu Bey")	Тэтэршъау	fl. 1792	They signed the official request for merchant ships and recognized Ottoman suzerainty. They took a formal oath of loyalty to the Ottoman Empire alongside other Zhane princes.
Netakhoqo Zan	Зан НэтIахъокъо	fl. 1812–early 1830s	The last major prince; attempted to reunite the survivors. After his death, the principality was dissolved.
Pshiquy Chukhoq	Цухъокъу Пщыкъуй	fl. 1826–1834	Listed as a prince in Ottoman/Russian records and also gets mentioned in Khan-Giray's accounts.
Selim	Сэлим	fl. 1830s	A former Ottoman major who returned to Circassia to join the war following the death of his brother. He represented the remaining Zhane elite in Atakum during councils.
