= Battle of Laba River =

- Part of the Russo-Circassian War
Date	November 1833
Location	Laba River, Kuban
Result	Russian victory

Belligerents
Russian Empire	Circassia

Commanders and leaders
Grigory Zass	(Circassia) Aytech Qanoqo

Strength
800 soldiers 400 Cossacks	2,000 Besleney, Abzakhs, and Kabardians

Casualties and losses
1 killed 14 wounded	Unknown
- aul of Aytech Qanoqo destroyed

The Battle of Laba River was an engagement between Russian forces under the command of Grigory Zass and Circassians under the command of Aytech Qanoqo during the Russo-Circassian War.

== Background ==
In July 1833, Zass was appointed commander of the Batalpashinsky section of the Kuban Line. Starting in August, Zass launched a series of expeditions against Circassians in an effort to push the Circassians as far as possible from the Kuban line. Zass systematically destroyed Circassian villages near the Kuban and Laba and cut clearings along the banks of the Laba and Khodz. Aytech Qanoqo, who had for a while fought on the side of the Russians, recently switched sides and joined the Circassians following a series of military setbacks by Russian forces in the late 1820s.

== Battle ==
Zass assembled a force of 800 infantry and 400 Cossacks with 6 light guns, and launched an attack on the Besleneys across the Laba river. He unexpectedly attacked the aul of Aytech Qanoqo and ravaged it. On the way back to the crossing over the Laba, the force was attacked by a detachment of 2,000 Besleney, Abzakhs and Kabardians led by Qanoqo. Qanoqo's forces set fire to dry grass and reeds along the path of the retreating Russians. Zass ordered a site to be burned for his force and protected himself from fire. When the Circassians approached closer, they were met with grapeshot. The Circassians fled shortly after, Zass quickly reached the Laba and, without stopping for the night, began the crossing by the light of fires. In this campaign, Zass lost 1 soldier and 14 were wounded.

== Aftermath ==
After failing to defeat Zass's forces, Aytech Qanoqo lost hope in the Circassian cause, and switched back to the Russian side. Grigory Zass destroyed 2 more Circassian auls in December.
