= Bursać =

Bursać is a Slavic surname. Notable people with the surname include:

- Aleksandar Bursać
- Boris Bursać
- Boško Bursać
- Dragoljub Bursać
- Ellen Elias-Bursać
- Marija Bursać
- Miloš Bursać
- Nikoletina Bursać

== See also ==
- Bursak
