= Pshiquy Akhezhaqo =

Circassian politician, military commander and nobleman

Prince Pshiquy Akhedjaqo
- Пщыкъуй Ахэджакъо
- Tamga of Pshiquy Akhezhaqo

Grand Prince of Cherchenay

Personal details
- Born: 1779 Bzhedugia, Circassia
- Died: May 1838 (aged 58–59) Bzhedugia, Circassia
- Spouse: Melek-Sultan
- Children: Talosten; Chemguy; Salatdjeriy
- House: Cherchan; Pshishawoqan; Akhedjaqo

Military service
- Allegiance: Circassian Confederation: Bzhedugia; Principality of Cherchenay
- Battles/wars: Russo-Circassian War

Pshiquy Akhezhaqo (Adyghe: Ахэджакъо Пщыкъуй; Russian: Пшикой Ахеджако; 1779–1838) was a Circassian politician, military commander and prince who took part in the Russo-Circassian War.

== Biography ==
=== Name ===
The name Pshiquy is a given name, while Akhezhaqo (or Akhezhaguqo) is a surname. Pshiquy is derived from the words pshi (prince) and quy (bald), and it translates to "Bald Prince".

=== Early life ===
Not much is recorded about Pshiquy, as Circassians did not write down their history, and all knowledge comes from Russian sources. Reportedly, he was born in 1779 in the Bzhedug region of Circassia. He was born into the Akhezhaqo family of the Pshishawoqan branch of the Cherchenay princes, one of the two ruling princely houses of Bzhedughia, and became the leader of his princedom. He was married to the sister of Sultan Khan-Giray.

=== Russo-Circassian War ===
Several reports state that Pshiquy was a respected person all around Circassia. His arrival made Circassians feel safe and Russian encampments worried. He had a permanent army of at least 6,000 horsemen, and during hostilities his detachment reached 12,000 horsemen.

Pshiquy was one of the Circassian commanders who defended the Anapa Fortress against the Russians during the Russo-Turkish War (1828–1829). He stationed his army near Yekaterinodar to prevent Russian forces from advancing into the interior of Circassia. He was famous for his victories over the Russian troops. It is recorded that he defeated General Velyaminov multiple times. In addition to military skill, he was also a talented statesman. In 1827–1828, he resolved the conflict between the commoners and the nobility in Bzhedughia; citing Islam’s principle of equality, he took refuge with the Abzakhs and restored the rights of the noble class.

In 1837, Pshiquy signed a truce with Russia, but according to John Longworth, he only appeared to align with the Russians as a strategic move. In reality, he passed intelligence he received from them to the Circassians to support the Circassian side. During the truce period, he also joined Shapsug raids into Russian-held territory, disguising his identity with wearing a mask.

According to Longworth, Pshiquy recognized that Russia’s ultimate aim was the complete occupation of Circassia. Although the Bzhedug tribe supported resistance efforts alongside the Shapsugs and Natukhais, the Bzhedug region was small, densely populated, and exposed due to its flat terrain. These strategic concerns led him to seek an agreement with Russia. He stated that, if permitted to relocate to the Abzakh mountains, they would immediately join the resistance and refrain from further negotiations with Russia. Pshiquy also noted that extending his authority and influence to the Abzakh region could help mediate intertribal conflicts and provide broader political stability.

=== Death ===
Sources state that he died of an illness in May 1838.
