= Bursak =

Bursak is a Slavic surname literally meaning "a student from bursa". Notable people with the surname include:

- Fyodor Bursak (1750–1827), Russian Imperial general and ataman of the Black Sea Cossack Host
- Max Bursak (born 1984), Ukrainian boxer

== See also ==
- Bursać
