= Maxim Grigorievich Vlasov =

Russian commander

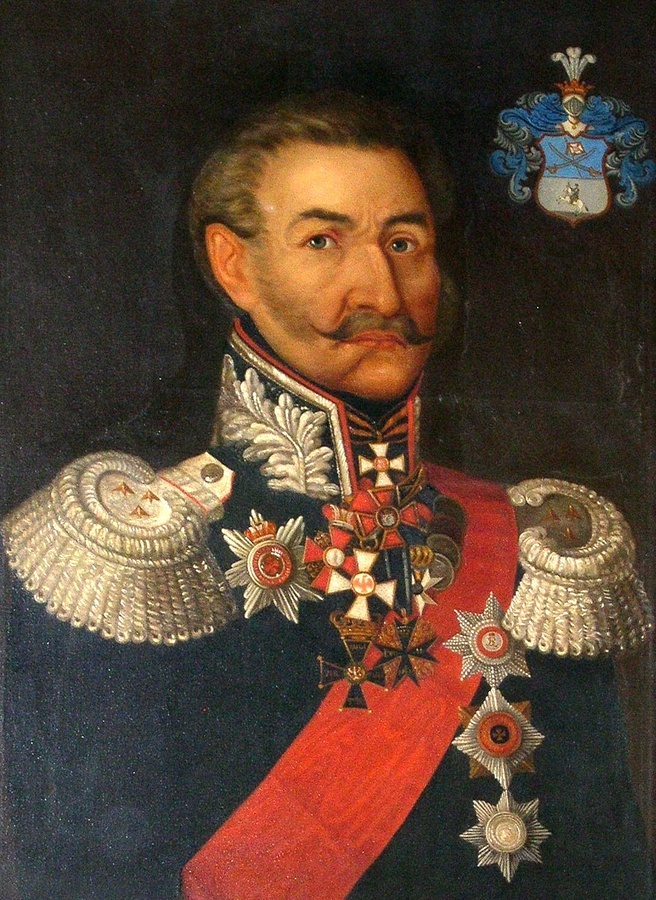
- Born: 1767
- Died: 1848 (aged 80–81)
- Military career
- Allegiance: Russia
- Conflicts: Russo-Circassian War
- Awards: Order of St. George; Order of Saint Vladimir; Order of Saint Anna; Order of Saint Alexander Nevsky; Golden Weapon for Bravery; Order of the Sword; Order of the Red Eagle; Pour le Mérite

Maxim Grigorievich Vlasov (13 August 1767 - 21 June 1848) was a Russian commander, general of the cavalry (1843), and chieftain of the Don Cossack army (1836). He commanded the Russian troops during the Russo-Circassian War and played a major role in the Circassian genocide.

== Biography ==
The son of a poor Don Cossack who had risen to the rank of an officer, Vlasov was a Cossack from the Razdorskaya stanitsa, born in 1767.

While traveling to his service in Poland, his father left him, at the age of nine, with the monks of the Kyiv-Pechersk Lavra, where he learned to read and write. In 1784, upon returning from Poland, his father took the boy from the monastery and assigned him as a clerk in the "civil administration." However, Maxim was not interested in office work—he was born a Cossack and wanted to remain one. He was registered for Cossack service and began active duty in 1786. In 1790, M. G. Vlasov was appointed as a clerk in Grekov’s regiment.

He participated in the wars with Poland in 1792 and 1794. With the Don Cossack army under Ataman Platov, he marched in defense of Prussia and also fought in the war of 1807 against Napoleon. He continued his service in the Russo-Turkish War of 1806–1812.

In the Turkish War of 1806–1812, Vlasov served in the Ataman Regiment. He participated in all the wars against Napoleon with the regiment named after him. He took part in heavy battles with the enemy.

In the Battle of Borodino, he commanded a separate detachment. He distinguished himself in rear-guard and vanguard battles while pursuing the French. Near Kovno, a detachment of three Cossack regiments under his command captured 23 officers and 2,237 French soldiers, for which he was awarded the Order of St. George (4th class). On February 2, 1813, M. G. Vlasov was promoted to colonel.

In 1813 and 1814, Vlasov, serving under the command of General-Adjutant A. Chernyshev in the foreign campaign of the Russian army, distinguished himself in battles during the capture of Berlin, Lüneburg, and Bad Belzig, where he took 20 officers and 1,207 soldiers prisoner.

For his bravery and achievements, Vlasov was awarded the Order of St. George (3rd class), and for his raid on Kassel, he was promoted to major general. He later participated in the Battle of Hanau, the siege of the Dutch fortress Coevorden, the storming of Soissons, and battles near Laon, Reims, Vilkova, and Marten.

In May 1819, Vlasov was appointed campaign ataman of the Don regiments in Georgia and was sent to the Caucasus, where he restored order in Imereti and the Shirvan Khanate. From 1820 to 1826, he was the chief administrator of the Black Sea Cossack Host, responsible for border security against highlander raids.

In his fundamental work on the Caucasian War, historian V. A. Potto dedicated a chapter to the valor of the Cossacks under General Vlasov's command (whom he mistakenly referred to as Mikhail Grigorievich) in the Battle of Kalaus against the Shapsugs and Janeevtsy (October 2–3, 1821, on the Kuban River, near the Kalaus estuary). According to V. A. Potto, M. G. Vlasov was at the forefront and personally participated in hand-to-hand combat alongside his men, shouting, *"Strike, lads! Drown, stab the infidel!"* For this battle, Emperor Alexander I awarded him the Order of St. Vladimir (2nd class). *"But the greatest reward for Vlasov,"* wrote Potto, *"remained the eternal memory of him in the Black Sea region, the external expression of which was the golden-mounted saber presented to him by the Black Sea Cossacks, on the blade of which the Kalaus battle was depicted."*.

In 1830–1831, Vlasov participated in the campaign against the Polish insurgents as a campaign ataman. In the First Battle of Wawer, he personally commanded attacking regiments and received ten wounds in battle. For his distinction, he was promoted to lieutenant general.

In 1836, M. G. Vlasov was appointed acting Don military ataman, and in 1843, he was promoted to general of the cavalry.

He died in noble rank in the Ust-Medveditskaya stanitsa (now the town of Serafimovich), having contracted cholera. He was buried there.

== Military Ranks ==
- Sotnik (10.07.1792)
- Yesaul (18.11.1794)
- Voysko Starshina (1807)
- Podpolkovnik (20.01.1810)
- Polkovnik (02.02.1813)
- General-Major (19.09.1813)
- General-Lieutenant (21.02.1831)
- General of the Cavalry (10.10.1843)

=== Awards ===
- Order of St. Vladimir 4th class with bow (1807)
- Order of St. Anna 2nd class (04.09.1809)
- Gold Sword for Bravery (1812)
- Order of St. George 4th class (26.03.1813)
- Gold Sword for Bravery (21.03.1813)
- Order of St. Vladimir 3rd class (1813)
- Order of St. George 3rd class (03.11.1813)
- Diamond insignia for the Order of St. Anne 2nd class (19.10.1813)
- Gold Sword for Bravery, decorated with diamonds (02.02.1814)
- Order of St. Vladimir 2nd class (1814)
- Order of St. Anne 1st class (1826)
- Imperial Crown for the Order of St. Anne 1st class (1831)
- Order of St. Alexander Nevsky (1831)
- Insignia of the Virtuti Militari 2nd class (1831)
- Gold snuffbox with the monogram of His Imperial Majesty (1835)
- Diamond insignia for the Order of St. Alexander Nevsky (06.12.1838)
- Order of St. Vladimir 1st class (16.04.1841)

=== Foreign Awards ===
- Prussian Pour le Mérite (1807)
- Swedish Order of the Sword Knight 1st class (1813)
- Prussian Order of the Red Eagle 1st class (1835)

== Legacy ==
External image
- Monument in the stanitsa Razdorskaya

- In 1904, his name was given to the 5th Don Cossack Regiment, which was then called 5th Don Cossack Regiment of Voysko Ataman Vlasov.
- In 2012, a monument to Ataman Maxim Vlasov was unveiled in the stanitsa Razdorskaya.
