= Russo–Circassian War =

Armed conflict in the Caucasus (1763–1864)

Russo-Circassian War
- Part of the Russo-Caucasian conflict (incl. the Caucasian War)
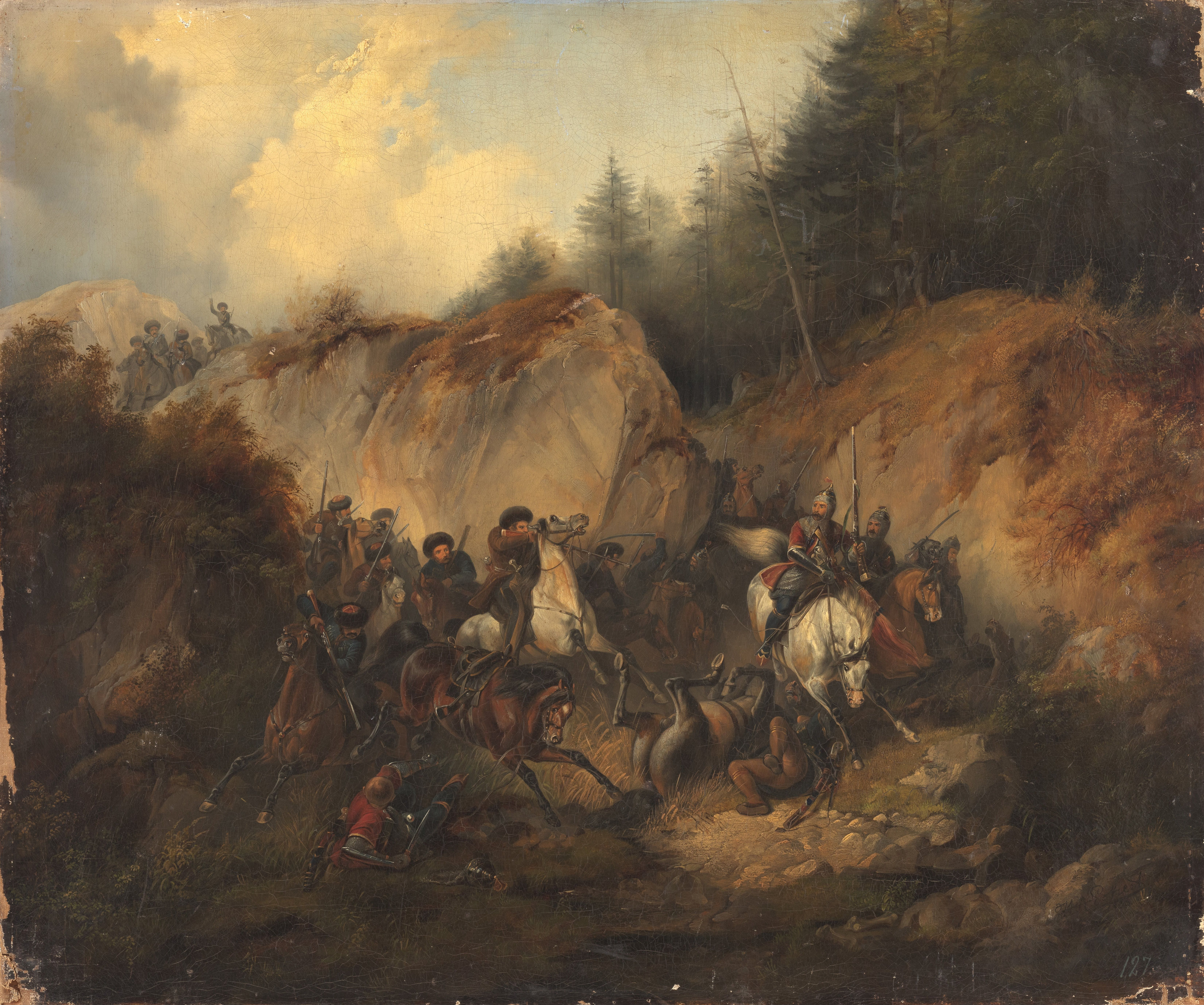
Date	28 July [O.S. 17 July] 1763 – 2 June [O.S. 21 May] 1864 (100 years, 10 months, 6 days) (Note: Disorganized Circassian resistance continued in the mountains until the 1880s.)
Location	Circassia (North Caucasus)
Result	Russian victory: Circassian genocide
Territorial changes	Annexation of the Caucasus, including Circassia, by Russia

Belligerents
Russian Empire: Subjects of Russian Empire: Kalmyk Khanate(1769–1771)	Circassian Confederation: Circassian regions: Abzakh; Ademey; Besleney; Bzhedug; Cherchenay; Khimishey; Chebsin; Hakuch; Hatuqay; Hytuk; Kheghache; Makhosh; Mamkhegh; Natukhaj; Shapsug; Chemguy; Ubykh; Yegeruqway; Zhane; Kabardia (East Circassia) (until 1822); and others; Aided by: Ottoman Empire (1787–1792; 1806–1812; 1828–1829); European adventurers (1818–1856); Caucasian Imamate (1848–1859)

Commanders and leaders
(Russian Empire) Catherine II (1763–1796); (Russian Empire) Paul I (1796–1801); (Russian Empire) Alexander I (1801–1825); (Russian Empire) Nicholas I (1825–1855); (Russian Empire) Alexander II (1855–1864); (Russian Empire) Pavel Tsitsianov (1787–1806); (Russian Empire) Fyodor Bursak (1799–1827) (DOW); (Russian Empire) Georgi Emmanuel (1815–1831); (Russian Empire) Aleksey Yermolov (1817–1827); (Russian Empire) Maxim Grigorievich Vlasov (1819–1843); (Russian Empire) Nikolay Yevdokimov (1820–1864); (Russian Empire) Aytech Qanoqo (1828–1844) (D) (executed); (Russian Empire) Grigory Zass (1830–1848) (WIA); (Russian Empire) Pavel Grabbe (1831–1842); (Russian Empire) David Dadiani (1841–1845); (Russian Empire) Aleksandr Baryatinsky (1856–1862); (Russian Empire) Dmitry Milyutin (1861–1864); (Russian Empire) Michael Nikolaevich (1862–1864); ...and others	Qasey Hatokhshoqo (1763–1773); Misost Bematuqo (1763–1788); Qalebatuqo Hatuqay (1807–1827); Ismail Berzeg (1823–1846); Hawduqo Mansur (1839–1846); Muhammad-Amin Asiyalav (1848–1859) (surrendered); Seferbiy Zanuqo (1807–1860) (DOW); Gerandiqo Berzeg (1820–1864) (WIA); Mansur Ushurma (1791) (POW) (DOW); Hamirza Qeytuqo (1764–1779) †; Qizbech Qanoqo (fl. 1781–fl. 1792); Pshiquy Akhezhaqo (1797–1838); Qizbech Tughuzhuqo (1810–1840) †; Jembulat Boletoqo (1814–1836) X; Qerzech Shirikhuqo (1816–1864); Aytech Qanoqo (1828–1844) (D) (surrendered) (executed); Jandjeriy Cherchanuqo (1827–1851); Ale Khirtsizhiqo (1776–1836) †; Ajdjeriyiqo Kushuk (?–1830) (DOW); Janseid Wuvzhuqo (1770s–1843) †; Muhammad Asha (1828–1846) †; Karamirza Aliy (1800s–1825) X †; (Poland) Teofil Lapinski (1857–1859); (United Kingdom) James Stanislaus Bell (1836–1839); ...and others

Units involved
(Russian Empire) Russian Imperial Army; (Russian Empire) Separate Caucasian corps (1817–1857); (Russian Empire) Russian artillery units; (Russian Empire) Russian cavalry units; (Russian Empire) Russian infantry units; Cossack raiders	Before 1860: Circassian Cavalry Units; Irregular military Abreks; Murtaziqs (1848–1859); After 1860: Circassian Confederal Army Foreign volunteers: (Ingushetia) Ingush volunteers; Chechen volunteers; Karachay-Balkar volunteers; Avar volunteers; Dargin volunteers; (Poland) Polish volunteers (after 1857)

Strength
150,000–300,000 regulars	20,000–60,000 regulars

Casualties and losses
(Russia) Disputed	Military casualties: Unknown; Civilian casualties: 1763–1818: 315,000+ After 1818: 1,200,000+ Total: 1,615,000+ (Estimate)
- During the Circassian genocide, approximately 1.5 to 2 million Circassian natives were slaughtered; and about 1,500,000 indigenous highland Caucasians were mainly expelled to the Ottoman Empire, and a much smaller number of them were expelled to Persia. An unknown number of those who were expelled died during their deportation.

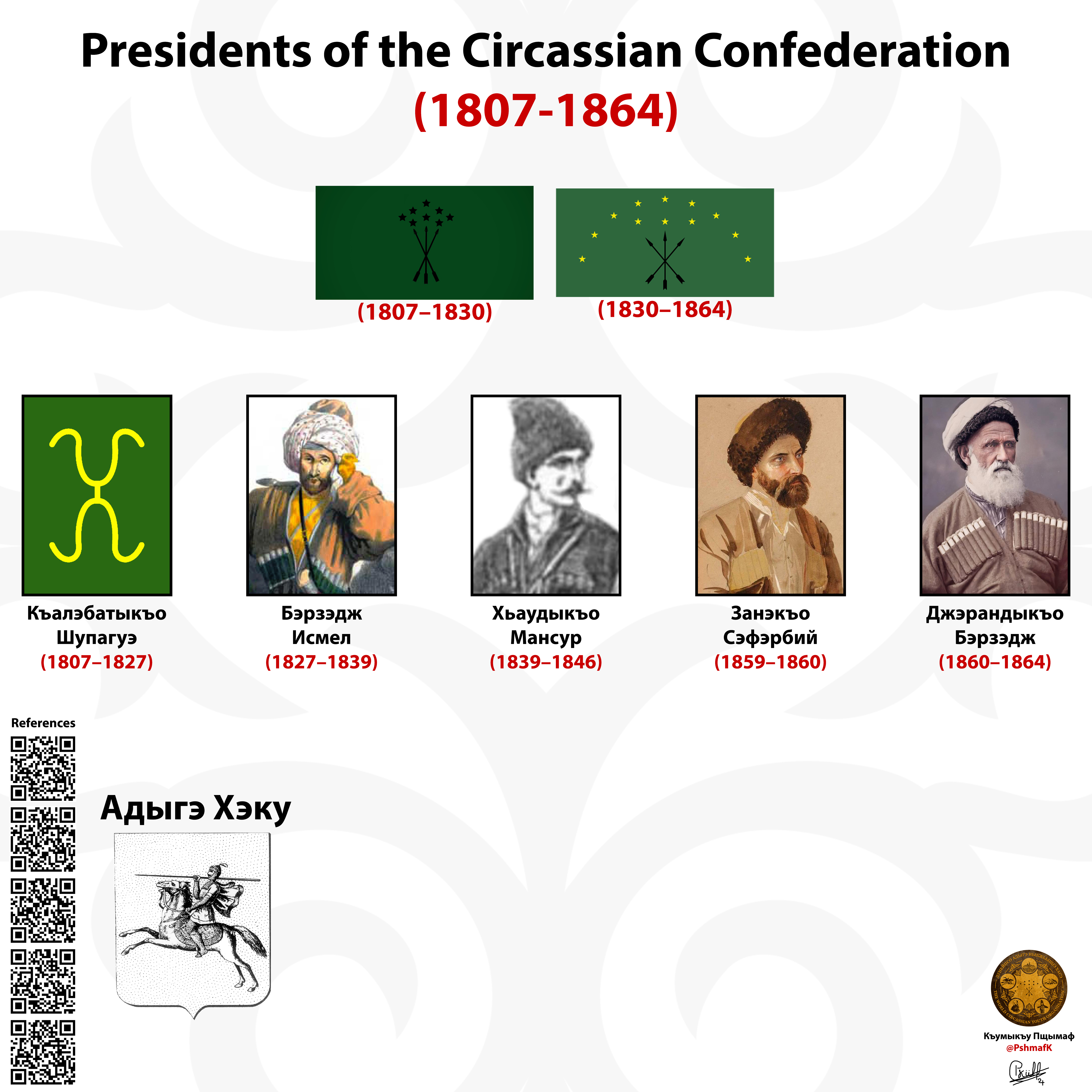
Presidents of the Circassian Confederation

The Russo–Circassian War, (Note: Adyghe: Урыс-адыгэ зао, romanized: Urys-adyge zaue; Russian: Русско-черкесская война, romanized: Russko-cherkesskaya voyna) also known as the Russian invasion of Circassia, or termed by the Circassians as the Great War with the Tsar (Note: Adyghe: Пачъыхь заожъ; Kabardian: Пащтыхь зауэжь) took place in the North Caucasus between July 1763 and June 1864. It began when the Russian Empire entered Circassia and occupied Mozdok, which prompted the Circassian people to organize a resistance movement to preserve their independence. Over the next century, the Imperial Russian Army expanded across the country until the last Circassian fighters were defeated in the Battle of Qbaada. It remains the longest war to have ever occurred in the Caucasus and in the history of Russia, as well as the longest and final war in the history of Circassia. Although it initially involved only Russia and Circassia, the conflict soon drew in a number of other Caucasian nations after they also became targets for Russian conquests, and it is consequently sometimes considered to be the western half of the Caucasian War.

During the hostilities, Russia recognized Circassia not as an independent polity, but as a Russian region that had fallen under rebel occupation—in spite of the fact that Circassia had never been controlled by Russia prior to the first incursion at Mozdok in 1763. Many Russian generals did not refer to the Circassians by their ethnonym and instead called them "mountaineers" or "bandits" in a pattern of broadly dehumanizing and xenophobic rhetoric that glorified the mass murder and rape of Circassian civilians.

Upon achieving hegemony throughout Circassia in 1864, Russia perpetrated the Circassian genocide, which continued until 1878 and resulted in the destruction of about 97% of the entire Circassian population. Upwards of 2,000,000 Circassians were killed during this period, while another 1,500,000 were displaced to the Ottoman Empire. (Note: The Ottoman Empire accepted to harbour the Muslim Circassians who were exiled during the Circassian genocide, 800,000–1,500,000 Circassians Between 95 and 97 percent of the total Circassian population were killed or expelled from the Caucasus region during the Circassian genocide. Most of the Circassian refugees fled to Ottoman territories. Different smaller numbers ended up in neighbouring Persia. During the process, the Russian and Cossack forces used various brutal methods to entertain themselves and scare off the native Circassians, such as tearing the bellies of pregnant women and removing the babies that were inside them, then feeding the babies to dogs. Russian generals such as Nikolai Yevdokimov and Grigory Zass allowed their soldiers to rape Circassian girls who were more than 7 years old.) The genocide caused the formation of the Circassian diaspora, which is mainly concentrated in countries that were once part of the Ottoman Empire, particularly Turkey, Jordan, and Syria.

In modern Russia, the war has been the subject of historical negationism: Russian state media and officials have gone as far as claiming that the invasion "never happened" and that Circassia "voluntarily joined Russia in the 16th century" in lieu of genocidal events documented by Russian historians of the 1860s. Contemporary accounts include those of Russian bureaucrat Adolf Berzhe, who portrayed the expulsion of Circassians as essential for "Russian security"; and Russian historian Rostislav Fadeyev, who described the campaign as "one of the most vital tasks in Russian history." Furthermore, in 1861, Russian emperor Alexander II (r. 1855–1881) publicly ordered the Imperial Russian Army to "utterly force out the hostile mountaineers (Circassians) from the fertile countries they occupy and settle on the latter a Russian Christian population forever."

== Before the war ==
Circassians, Christianised through Byzantine influence between the 5th and 6th centuries, were generally in alliance with Georgians, and both groups wanted to keep good relations with the Russians. In 1557, Temruqo Idar of Eastern Circassia allied with the Russian Tsar Ivan the Terrible and built a defense against possible enemies. Circassians were Christians during this period and Islam had not begun to spread. In 1561, Ivan the Terrible married Goshenay, daughter of Temruqo, and named her Mariya. In several narratives, Temruqo, because of his alliance with Russia, was described as a tyrant who only cared about his rule.

Although there had previously been a small Muslim presence in Circassia, significant conversions came after 1717, when Sultan Murad IV ordered the Crimeans to spread Islam among the Circassians. Islam gained much more ground later as conversion came to be used to cement defensive alliances to protect the Circassians' independence against Russian expansion. Despite this, there were still Pagans and Christians among the Circassian people. The Circassian-Russian alliance was damaged and eventually broken when the Circassians converted to Islam and adopted a more pro-Ottoman policy.

On 13 May 1711, Tsar Peter I ordered Araksin, Governor of Astrakhan, to pillage Circassia. Araksin moved with 30,000 strong Russian armed forces and, on 26 August 1711, broke into the lands of the Circassians, and captured Kopyl town (now Slavianski). From there, heading towards the Black Sea, he seized ports on the Kuban and looted and pillaged them. Then, he marched up along the Kuban River, pillaging villages. During this single invasion in Circassia, the Russians killed 43,247 Circassian men and women, and drove away 39,200 horses, 190,000 cattle and 227,000 sheep from Circassia. Russia continued to wage this type of warfare against Circassia from 1711 to 1763; the intent of this type of operation was not to annex Circassia but rather to raid it. Although Peter I was unable to annex Circassia in his lifetime, he laid the political and ideological foundation for the occupation to take place.

=== The confrontation of Prince Temruqo against the Ingush ===
After the departure of Timur, the Ingush left their mountains and began to develop the foothill plains in the 15th–16th centuries. In 1562, the Kabardian prince Temruqo Idar undertook an aggressive campaign against the Ingush, supplemented by detachments of Nogai Murzas. The Russian Tsar Ivan IV the Terrible, married to Temruqo's daughter Maria, sent 1,000 Cossacks under the command of Grigory Pleshcheev to aid Temruqo. As a result of this unified Kabardino–Nogai–Cossack campaign, 164 settlements were defeated, judging by the Russian chronicles. The Ingush returned to the mountains, and their former territory was settled by Kabardians.

=== Political reasons of the war ===
Circassia was a key strategic location amidst the power struggle between the emerging Russian Empire, the established England and France, and the failing Ottoman Empire. Russia sought to expand along the Black Sea, and England sought to reduce Russia's ability to take advantage of the declining Ottoman Empire, known as the Eastern Question.

To counter Persian influence in the region, Russia would require shipyards on the Black Sea, which made Circassia, with its coastline and fertile valleys, a target. By 1853, near the end of the war, the Black Sea had become responsible for a third of Russian exports, making the area very important for trade.

=== Starting date of the war ===
The date of the outbreak of the Russo–Circassian War has been a matter of debate by historians. Most scholars agree that organised warfare happened after 1763 when Russia established forts in Circassian territory, but small-scale conflicts had been ongoing since 1711. Another view held by a smaller number of scholars is that proper warfare began in 1817 with the arrival of Aleksey Yermolov, and prior to that it was merely clashes.

== The conflict ==
=== Pre-1817 period ===
During the reign of Catherine II, the Imperial Russian Army started entering Circassian soil and Russia started building forts in an attempt to quickly annex Circassia. On 17 July (O.S.) 1763, Russian forces entered the town of Mezdeug (modern-day Mozdok) in Eastern Circassia, turning it into a Russian fortress. Thus began the first hostilities between the Circassians and the Russian Empire.

While some Kabardian (Eastern Circassian) nobles wanted to fight the Russians, arguing they could convince the Ottomans and Crimea to help them, other nobles wanted to avoid fighting with Russia and to try to make peace.

In January 1764, several Kabardian nobles including Misost Bematuqo Hatokhshoqo met with the representative of the Russian Kizlyar commandant N. A. Potapov and unsuccessfully demanded the demolition of the Mozdok fortress built by the Russians. If the Russian government refused, the Kabardian princes threatened to seek alliance with the Crimean Khan against Russia.

Also in 1764, Kabardian Circassian knights Keysin Keytiqo and Kundeyt Shebez-Giray met with Catherine II in Saint Petersburg. They informed her that "the military build-up in Mezdeug was unacceptable, the region has been a land of Circassians, [and] the situation would create hostility and conflict". She refused diplomacy and the envoys were sent back. On 21 August 1765, the citizens of Circassia were instructed by the Russian general Johann de Medem to accept Russian control or face the Russian army. In 1765, Kabardian Circassians occupied the fortress of Kizlyar.

In June 1767, Bematuqo started a military operation against Russia, though many other Kabardian nobles did not want a war and wanted to surrender. In the middle of 1768, fifteen of these Kabardian princes who decided to surrender reported to Kizlyar that they were ready to "take an oath" of allegiance to Russia. Bematuqo, not wanting to surrender or convert to Christianity, refused.

Bematuqo's resistance was strengthened on 18 October 1768 when he received a letter from the Ottoman sultan, who had declared war on Russia, in which the sultan ordered that all the Muslim peoples of the Caucasus should officially rise to war with Russia, obey the Crimean Khan as their commander, and, together with the Nogais, defeat Russia. In December 1768, Muhammad-aga, the personal envoy of the Crimean Khan, arrived in Kabarda. The Crimean Khan asked the Kabardian princes to help the Kuban serasker in the upcoming campaign to Russia.

In January 1769, the Kizlyar commandant Potapov sent a letter to Bematuqo which pressured him to stop listening to the Ottoman sultan and surrender. Later that year, the Kabardian Circassians were defeated and their army destroyed in a battle against the Russian army, which was supported by Kalmyk Khan's 20,000 cavalrymen. Another major battle took place in the Nartsane area in June 1769, when a large Russian army entered Kabardia and took up positions near the Pashtu Mountains. Circassian forces under Bematuqo's leadership retreated as both sides suffered losses.

At this point, the anti-Russian group, which refused to cooperate with the Russian tsarist government, was headed by Bematuqo. He and his supporters moved to the upper reaches of the Kumy River. In need of allies, they turned to the Crimean Khan Devlet Giray for help. The Khan promised to send a small detachment; however, before that happened, the Russian lieutenant general de Medem sent detachments of Cossacks and Kalmyk cavalry against the Kabardians. In an unequal battle on the river Eshkokon, the superior Russian forces defeated the Kabardians.

As a result of the Russo-Turkish War (1768–1774), the Ottomans had forces in Circassia. They were seen as fellow Muslim allies by the Circassians. The Cossacks defended the village of Naur against a combined Circassian-Turkish army of 8,000 men.

The Circassian Revolution began in 1770.

In 1771, Circassians under the command of Soqur Qaramirza burned many Cossack and Russian barracks. On 29 September that year, a battle took place near the Malka River and was won by the Russians under General Yakobi.

In 1772, a serious battle took place in Daghestan territory. There were 10,000 Russian soldiers in the fort at Kizlyar. Both sides suffered serious losses as finally the Russians emerged victorious. In the same year, the Kabardian princes sent another embassy to the Crimean Khan Devlet IV Girey, requesting his assistance in the inevitable war against tsarist Russia. However, despite nominally being allies, the Crimean Khanate attacked Circassia in June 1774. A large Crimean army led by Khan Devlet IV Girey and Kalga Shabaz Girey attacked Kabarda in the Battle of Beshtamak. The Crimeans entered Mozdok and occupied and ruined the nearby villages.

The Ottoman Empire lost its protection over the Crimean Khanate with the 1774 Treaty of Küçük Kaynarca. Following these events, Russian presence in the region strengthened, and the Circassians requested help and alliance from the Ottomans.

In 1776 the Russian army built several forts in Terek to encircle the Kabardian Circassians from the north. The Circassians managed to gather a 14,000-strong army and won back several forts. From 1777 the Russians built a line of forts from Mozdok northwest to Azov. The presence of Cossacks in former grazing lands slowly converted traditional raiding from a kind of ritualized sport into a serious military struggle. In 1778, a battle took place between the Russian troops under the command of Colonel Kulbakov and the Circassians.

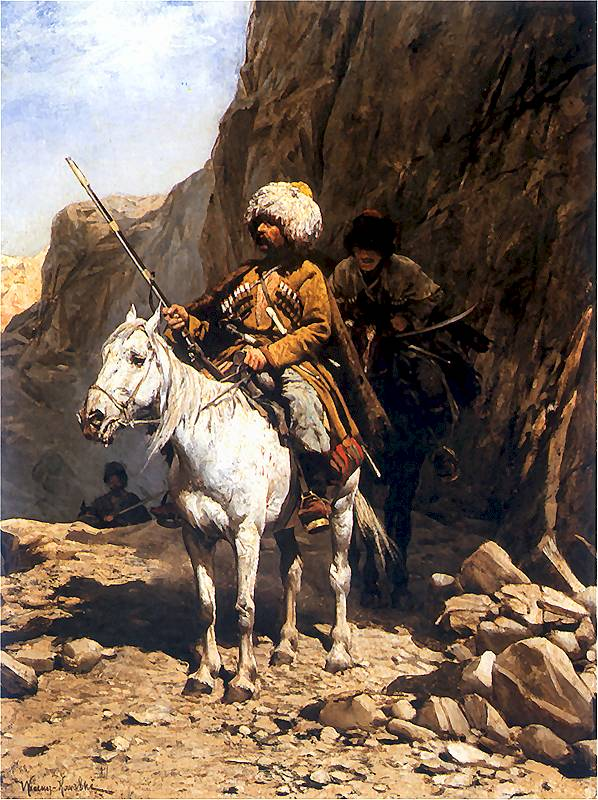
Circassian patrol

The construction of the Azov-Mozdok Line beginning in 1777 severely disrupted Kabardian migration routes essential for livestock grazing and led to economic collapse among the Kabardians, Ossetians, Balkars, and Abazins. The Kabardians launched attacks even during the early phases of the constructions. Following a national congress held in March 1779, the Kabardians decided on full-scale war an, electing Prince Misost Bematiqo as commander-in-chief of the Circassian coalition, which included the Chemguy, Besleney, and other allied forces. The Kabardians established their camp in the Qeytuqo Tuasha region and began systematic assaults on Russian positions, cutting communication lines between the fortresses and launching attacks. This conflict was named as the Seven Months' War and was the largest conflict of the Russo–Circassian War up to that time.

The conflict’s turning point came with two decisive battles that severely weakened the Kabardian leadership. During the Night Assault of June 10–11, while Prince Hamirza Qeytuqo was leading the siege of Marinskaya Fortress, Russian forces under General Yakobi broke the siege after six hours of fighting, killing 500 commoners and 50 nobles and princes including Prince Hamirza and his descendants. At the Battle of Qeytuqo Tuasha on October 10, Generals Fabritsian and Yakobi launched a coordinated attack on the main Kabardian camp. The Russian army destroyed the camp and killed nearly all of the Kabardian forces, consisting of 300–350 nobles and princes.

Following a Russian campaign led by General Yakobi into Greater Kabardia and by Suvorov into Lesser Kabardia, the remaining Kabardian princes were forced to accept a harsh treaty in December. The treaty established new borders along the Malka and Terek rivers, imposed massive reparations including 10,000 rubles and thousands of livestock, and formally recognized Russian suzerainty. Although Kabardia lost a third of its territory and much of its nobility in the conflict, Kabardia endured for several more decades until the final Russian conquest in the 1820s.

In 1781, the Ottomans built a strong fortress in Circassia to ensure Turkish influence in the region and to act as a base for future operations against Russia in Kuban, the Don, and Crimea.

In 1782, Ferah Ali Pasha arrived at Soghujaq Castle in Western Circassia as a missionary and diplomat from the Ottoman Empire with the aim of Islamizing some Circassians who were still not Muslims.

The position of the Kabardians became even more precarious when Russia occupied Kuban in 1781 and annexed Crimea in 1783. Many Tatars, erstwhile enemies, took refuge in Circassia. Sensing the threat posed by Russia, the Circassians and Nogais launched joint attacks on the Russians in the Western Caucasus in 1784, but no success was achieved. Between 1783 and 1785, Russian forces led by General Potyomkin attacked the Kabardia region.

In 1784, Sheikh Mansur, an imam in Chechnya who wanted to unite all Caucasian peoples against Russia, declared holy war against the Russian Empire. In response, the Russian army launched a military expedition to capture Mansur, but were defeated during the Battle of the Sunja.

In 1786, Russian forces abandoned the new fort of Vladikavkaz, and did not occupy it again until 1803. From 1787 to 1791, during the Russian-Turkish War, Sheikh Mansur moved to Circassia and started Western Circassian resistance against Russia, leading the Circassians in assaults against Russian forces.

The Russian army entered Circassia again after the Battle of Jilehoy and raided the Abaza, Besleney, Chemguy, and Hatuqay regions in 1787, successfully defeating the regional Circassian armies and burning nearly a hundred villages. That same year, Circassian envoys led by Tatarkhan Kurighoqo and Sidak Jankat requested a meeting with the Russians to secure a solution, but were denied. In 1788, the Russians besieged the Bighurqal (Anapa) castle but failed to take it.

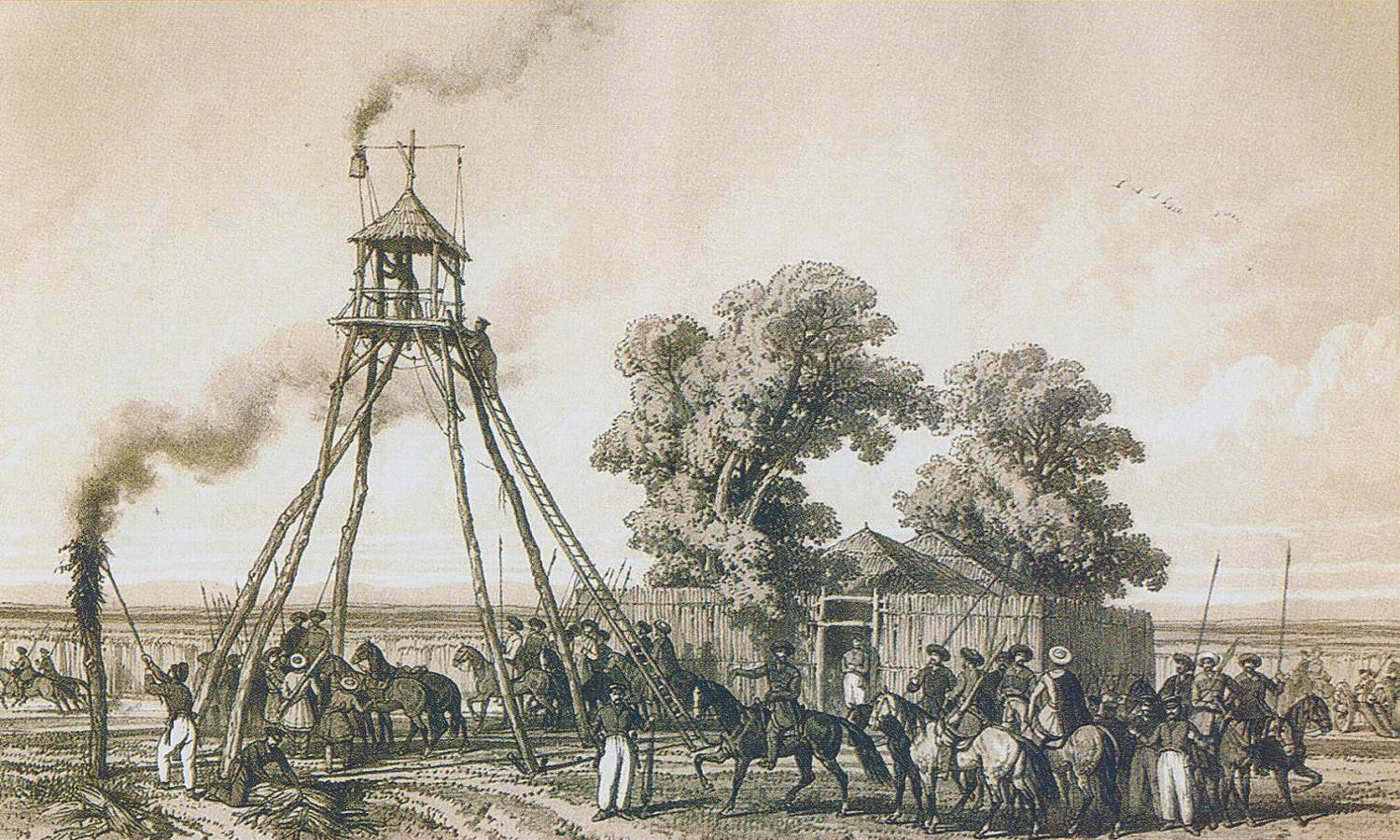
A Cossack Post on the Approach of the Circassians

In 1790, a large Russian army led by General Yury Bogdanovich Bibikov crossed the Kuban River and entered the territory of Western Circassia. Bibikov managed to reach Anapa, but failed to capture the castle. He also suffered heavy losses during his retreat. After this defeat, Bibikov was removed from his post and Circassian attacks on Russian forts increased significantly. At the same year, Russian armies entered the Bzhedugh region and burnt several villages.

The Russians introduced courts in Kabarda in the early 1790s and declared the removal of Adyghe Xabze (Circassian moral code), to the anger of the Circassians.

On 29 May (O.S.) 1791, Russian troops led by Ivan Gudovich crossed the Kuban and entered Circassia to capture the Anapa castle, establishing a camp in June. Thereafter, the Russians successfully captured the castle in the siege of Anapa. Once the Russian army entered the fortress, as per Gudovich's orders, it was completely destroyed, its wells were poisoned, and its houses were burned. Sheikh Mansur was captured in the fort; when Russian troops left Anapa on 10 July, he was brought to Saint Petersburg and imprisoned for life in harsh conditions. He died in April 1794, reportedly due to poor treatment.

After a large influx of Cossack settlers and the construction of a long line of pickets in 1792, which cut the Circassians off from their traditional pastures around the Kuban River, the Circassians began systematically raiding Russian encampments and then disappearing. At the same time, as more Russian troops were stationed in the region, they started to raid native villages, further enraging the natives and producing cycles of retaliation. The Russian military tried to impose authority by building a series of forts, but these forts in turn became the new targets of raids; indeed, at times some were captured and held by the highlanders.

In 1799, Russian general Fyodor Bursak organized several raids against the Western Circassians, and personally ordered his men to burn Circassian villages, even those who were loyal to the Russian Empire.

In 1800, as part of the Russian conquest of the Caucasus, Russia annexed eastern Georgia and by 1806 held Transcaucasia from the Black Sea to the Caspian. Because Russia held the central Georgian Military Road, the war against the mountaineers was divided into eastern and western parts. With Georgia out of the question, more armies were directed to Circassia. Russian armies successfully crossed the Kuban River again in March 1814. Western Circassians used this opportunity to promote the young prince Jembulat Bolotoqo and sent a delegation to the Ottoman Empire to complain against the Russian actions.

On 22 February 1802, near the Karakuban Island, Western Circassians captured and burned a Russian ship in the Black Sea. During the battle, two Russian admirals and fourteen Cossacks soldiers were killed; the rest surrendered and were pardoned by the Circassians.

In 1804, the Kabardian Circassians and neighbouring Abazins, Balkars, Karachays, Ossetians, and Chechens united in a military movement. They aimed to destroy the Kislovodsk Russian fort. Despite threats of bloodshed from General Pavel Tsitsianov, the forces began threatening the Kislovodsk fort.

During the uprising of Adil-Giray Atajukin and Efendi Ishak Abukov in Kabarda on 9 May 1804, a battle took place near the Chegem River. The Karachays, Ossetians, and Balkars came to the rescue, Lieutenant General Glazenap himself in a report to the Russian emperor Alexander I reported that the fight lasted from 11 a.m. to 6 p.m. at the same time in the evening, noting: "...fought in the gorges for the most part with 11,000 desperately fighting Kabardians, Chegemians, Balkars, Karachays and Ossetians, knocked out of 12 dug auls." Russian forces commanded by Glazenap were pushed back to Georgievsk and then besieged; however, the attacking Kabardian forces were eventually repelled, and 80 Kabardian villages were burnt as a reprisal.

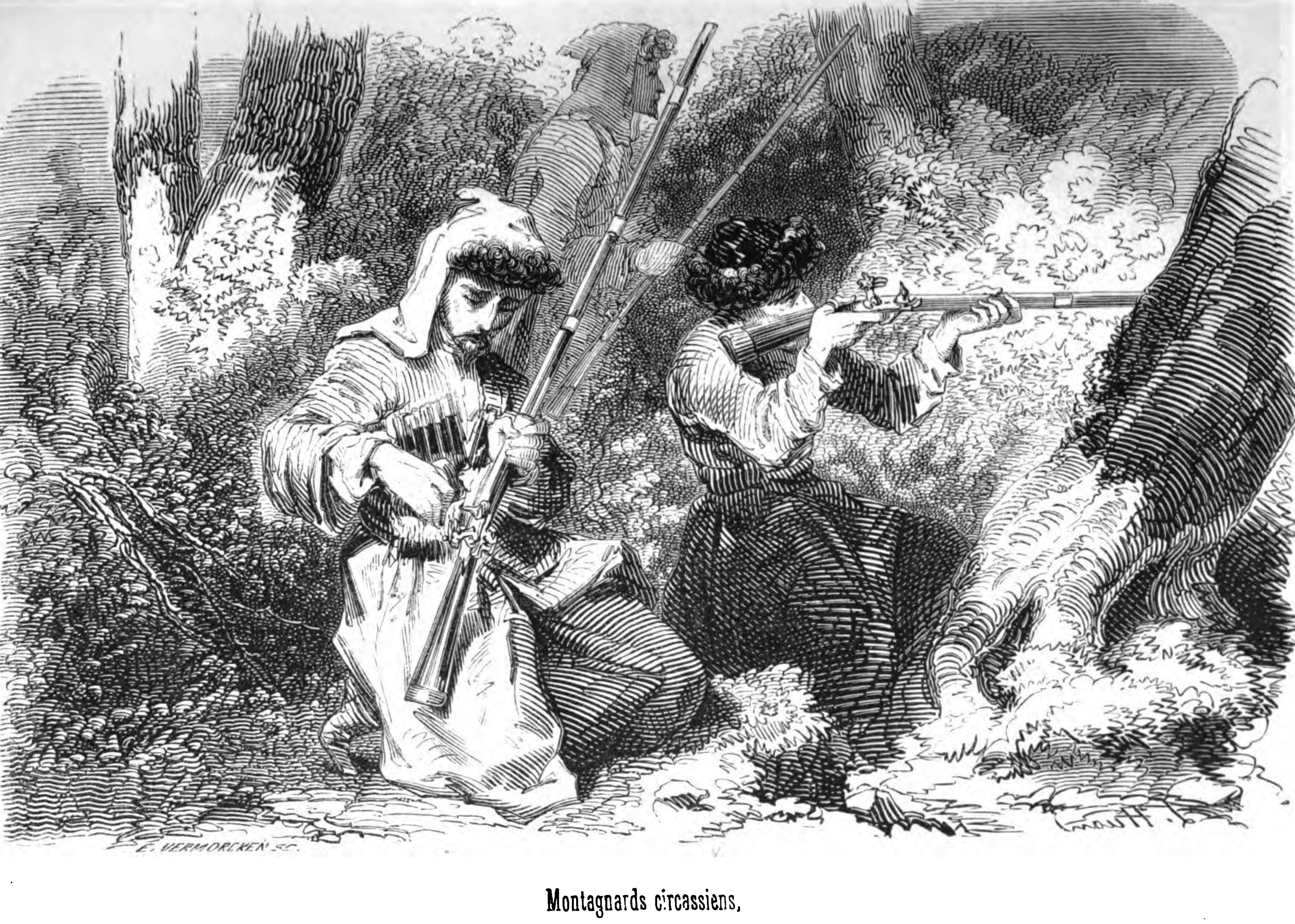
Circassian guerillas

In 1805, a plague struck Kabardia. Using this as an excuse, Glazenap ordered his forces to burn down 80 villages to terrorize the people into submission and to wreak revenge upon the Kabardians. In 1810 about 200 villages were burned. In 1817 the frontier was pushed to the Sunzha River and in 1822 a line of forts was built from Vladikavkaz northwest through Nalchik to the Pyatigorsk area. Fighting subsided after 1825. Between 1805 and 1807, General Bulgakov's army burned more than 280 villages. The population of Kabarda was reduced from 350,000 in 1763 to only 37,000 in 1817.

In 1807, the fortress of Anapa was captured by Russian troops and Circassian nobleman Seferbiy Zaneqo was taken as hostage.

In 1808, a Russian commission decided that to end Circassian resistance against the Russian Empire, the Circassians would need to be eliminated from their homeland.

In 1809–1810, unrest spread across Kabardia as resistance to Russian colonial rule intensified. In response, Russia deployed additional armed forces to the region, preventing Kabardinian villages from relocating to the mountains and arresting or sentencing Kabardinian princes who opposed Russian authority. Faced with overwhelming pressure and the apparent futility of resistance, most Kabardinian princes ultimately submitted to Russian rule and pledged allegiance to the autocracy of the Tsar. As a form of tribute, Russian authorities demanded from them 1,000 horses, 500 cattle, and 10,000 rubles.

Despite these punitive measures, the Kabardinians remained defiant. In an effort to crush further resistance, Russia launched a large-scale punitive expedition in 1810 under General Bulgakov. His forces plundered and burned down 200 Circassian and Balkar villages, massacred much of the population, and seized more than 20,000 cattle.

That same year, another uprising erupted in Kabarda, with the Balkars providing support to the Kabardians. On April 30, General Bulgakov reported from his camp near the Cherek River that a force of over 2,000 Kabardinian horsemen, supported by infantry and Balkar allies, had taken defensive positions in two fortified gorges at the foot of the snowy mountains, where they were ultimately blockaded by Russian troops.

In January 1810, Circassians raided and plundered the Cossack settlements of Ivanovskaya and Stebliyevkaya. At the Olginsk Fortress, they killed 146 Cossacks, including the fortress commander Colonel Tikhovski. During these operations, the Circassian army suffered around 500 casualties.

In February of the same year, Fyodor Bursak's forces entered a Circassian village near the Sop River and proceeded to kill every single inhabitant. They decided to postpone their plans to attack the next village when the river began to overflow. In December, the same methods were applied in the Shapsug region, and several villages were burnt. After some civilians deserted to the forests, the forests in the region were burnt down.

In 1811, petitions were sent to St. Petersburg in Russia, appealing for the basic rights of Circassians in the occupied areas.

During the whole period from 1779 to 1818, the Russian army reportedly killed 315,000 of the 350,000 Kabardian Circassians.

=== Post-1817 period ===
==== Russian conquest of Kabarda ====
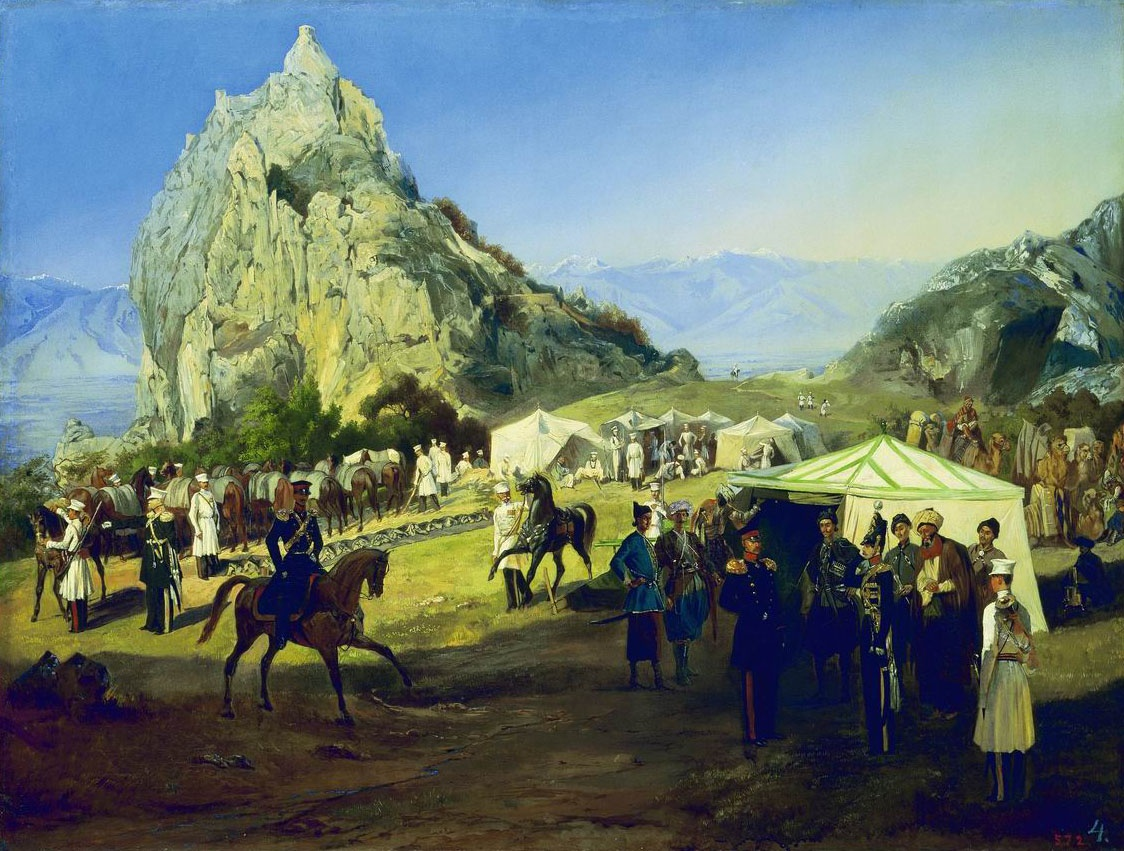
Russian military camp in the Caucasus

In 1817, Russian veteran general Aleksey Yermolov arrived in the Caucasus. Deciding that Circassians would not surrender, General Yermolov concluded that "terror" would be effective. Russia began to destroy Circassian fortresses, villages, and towns and slaughter the people.

In May 1818, the village of Tram was surrounded, burnt, and its inhabitants killed by Russian forces under the command of General Ivan Petrovich Delpotso, who took orders from Yermolov. Delpotso then wrote to the rebel forces: "This time, I am limiting myself on this. In the future, I will have no mercy for the guilty brigands; their villages will be destroyed, properties taken, wives and children will be slaughtered." These brutal methods further enflamed the Circassians, and many Circassian nobles, even those who had been in blood feuds for centuries, united to strengthen their resistance. In Europe, especially in England, there began to form a great sympathy for the Circassians who resisted the Russians.

In response to persistent Circassian resistance and the failure of their previous policy of building forts, the Russian military began using a strategy of disproportionate retribution for raids. With the goal of imposing stability and authority beyond their current line of control and over the whole Caucasus, Russian troops retaliated by destroying villages or any place that resistance fighters were thought to hide, as well as employing assassinations and executions of whole families. Understanding that the resistance relied on food from sympathetic villages, the Russian military also systematically destroyed crops and livestock. These tactics further enraged natives and intensified resistance to Russian rule. The Russians began to counter this by modifying the terrain, both environmentally and demographically. They cleared forests by roads, destroyed native villages, and often settled new farming communities of Russians or pro-Russian Orthodox peoples.

The complete destruction of villages and their occupants became a standard action by the Russian army and Cossack units, marking the beginning of the Circassian genocide. Nevertheless, the Circassian resistance continued. Villages that had previously accepted Russian rule were found resisting again, much to the ire of Russian commanders.

In September 1820, Russian forces began to forcibly resettle inhabitants of Eastern Circassia. Throughout the conflict, Russia had employed a tactic of divide and rule. Military forces were sent into Kabardia, killing cattle and causing large numbers of inhabitants to flee into the mountains, with their land appropriated for the Kuban Cossacks. The entirety of Kabardia (Eastern Circassia) was then declared property of the Russian government.

==== The fall of Kabardia ====
General Yermolov accelerated his efforts in Kabardia, with fourteen villages displaced in March 1822 alone as Yermolov led expeditions. The construction of new defensive lines in Kabardia led to renewed uprisings, which were eventually crushed; to discourage further uprisings, Russian forces freed the peasant work forces of the rebellious lords. The area was placed under Russian military rule in 1822, as Kabardia eventually fully fell.

==== Invasion of Western Circassia ====
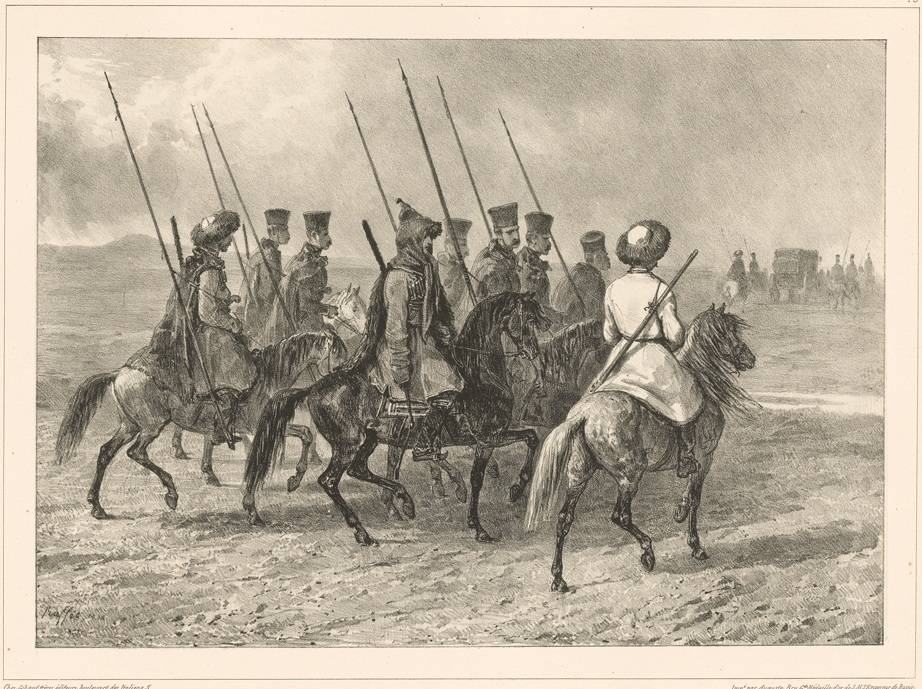
Cossack patrol on the Kuban line

While Eastern Circassia was being occupied, Russia was also engaged in sporadic wars with its other neighbors, including a war with the Turks (Russo-Turkish War of 1806–1812) to free the Black Sea from Turkish influence. In Western Circassia, which Russia had previously been merely foraying into, a number of groups were dominant—including the Besleneys, Abzakhs, Ubykhs, Shapsugs, Hatuqay, and Natukhajs—which Russian propaganda portrayed as savages in a possible attempt to curry favour from the international community. Russian and Circassian forces clashed repeatedly, particularly on the Kuban plains, where cavalry from both sides could manoeuvre freely.

Trade with Circassia could not be prevented, however, and both the Turkish and the English supplied Circassia with firearms and ammunition with which to fight the Russians. In 1830 alone, up to 200 Turkish and British ships arrived and delivered military aid to the shores of Circassia. England also supplied several advisors, while Turkey attempted to persuade Circassia to start a holy war, which would draw support from other nations.

==== Rise of Jembulat Boletoqo ====
Meanwhile, the Circassian commander Jembulat Boletoqo led his cavalry force into Russian territory. On 23 October, only one Cossack regiment decided to fight the rising Circassian army at the village of Sabl on the Barsukly River. Boletoqo's forces surrounded the Cossacks and killed all of them in a saber attack.

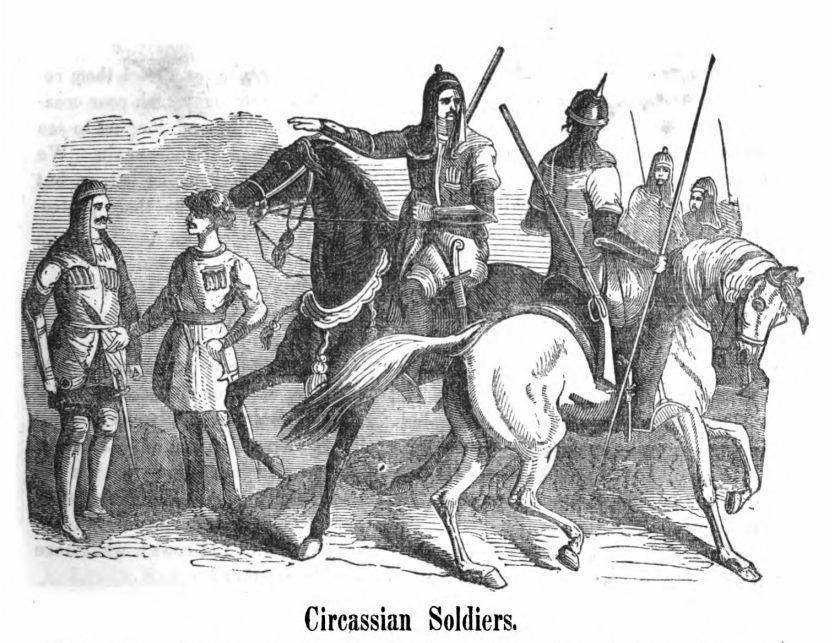
Circassian Soldiers

In April 1823, Boletoqo and his forces along with the army of the Circassian lord Skhum attacked the Russian line. Lord Skhum was wounded in the cheek by a spear on each side and by a bullet around the spine. The Russians withdrew and left more than twenty prisoners to the Circassians. In May, the Circassians burned a large Russian fortress in Kruglolesskoe. Under the leadership of Boletoqo, Circassian cavalry headed for Russian camps. Half of the detachment consisted of Kabardians who fled Kabardia to continue fighting. Multiple Cossack armies were defeated by this detachment. Later that year, thirty Circassian regional leaders gathered in the village of Boletoqo behind the Belaya River. A plan was made to retake Kabardia from the Russians. In 1832, Boletoqo tried to implement this plan, but failed.

In February 1824, the Russian army led by General Vlasov attacked the Circassian villages of Jambut, Aslan, Morza, and Tsab Dadhika and completely destroyed them, along with their inhabitants, despite the villages being loyal to the Russian Empire.

In the summer of 1825, Russian forces carried out several military operations. On 18 August, a group of Russian officers commanded by General Veliaminov burned the residency of Hajji Tlam, one of the elderly supporters of the Circassian resistance in Abadzekh, and killed his entire family. The village was alarmed and Circassian men and women took up arms and attacked the Russian soldiers who caused the killing. Before the Russians had time to retreat, they were completely destroyed by the Circassian counterattack.

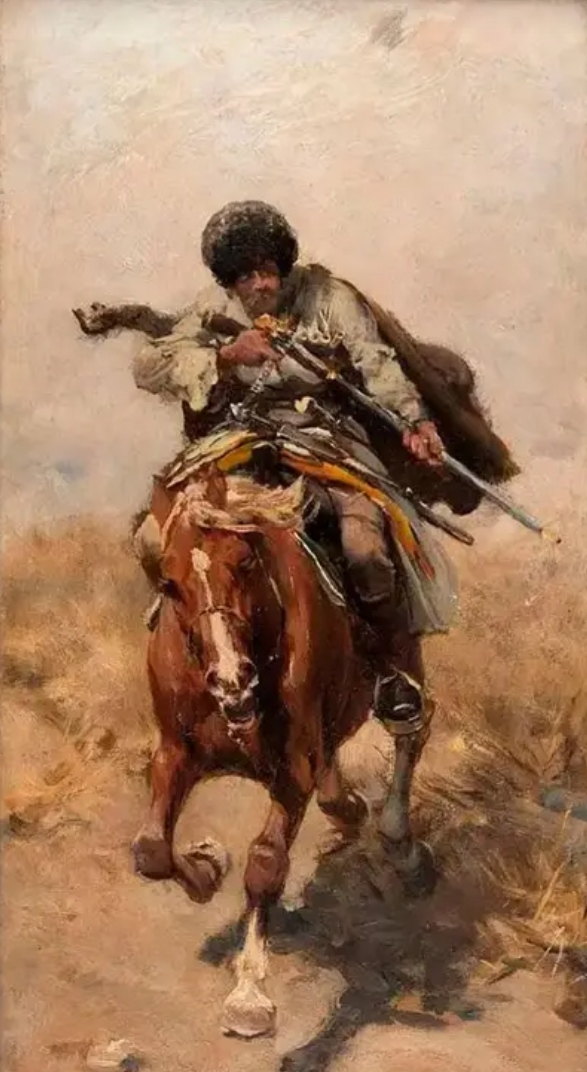
Circassian warrior, by Alfred Kowalski, 1895

On 31 January, Boletoqo burned down the fortress of Marevskoye as revenge. On 4 June 1828, he started his campaign into Russian lands with 2,000 cavalry under five flags of different Circassian principalities, as well as a Turkish flag symbolizing their loyalty to Islam. The Russians concluded that he intended to go to Kabarda in the middle of the Russian-Turkish war, and open a second front on the Terek and Sunja Rivers. Earl Paskevich ordered the 2nd Ulan division, returning from the Russia-Iran war, to move along the Georgian Military Road to cut off the route of the Circassians toward Kabarda. The 40th Eger battalion marched from Kabarda toward Boletoqo. Yet, Boletoqo suddenly changed direction and headed toward the town of Georgievsk, the Russian administrative center in the Caucasus. The Circassian army stopped on a high hill at a distance from the Marinskaya fortress. Boletoqo menaced the Volzhskiy regiment's left flank with all his forces, and won the battle.

Political analyst Khan-Giray observed that the situation changed for Great-Prince Jembulat Boletoqo "after the field marshal Paskevich left the region". The new commander-in-chief, Baron Rosen, did not believe in human rights of the indigenous Circassians.

In 1827, Ismail Berzeg officially declared the military confederation of the Circassian societies. By the end of 1839, he managed to unite a significant part of the population under his control.

The Russians besieged Anapa in 1828. The Ottomans sought help from Circassians, and the conflict lasted for two months. Osman Pasha, the Turkish commander of Anapa, decided to surrender the fort, and Seferbiy himself led the negotiations to avoid potential bloodshed but was taken prisoner by the Russians. General Emanuel, a Russian general, then razed six Natukhay villages and many Shapsugh villages. He then passed the Kuban and burned 210 more villages.

In 1828, Aytech Qanoqo, a Circassian prince who lost his status in the Circassian Revolution, arrived at the Russian camp, where he took an oath of allegiance to the Russian Empire, changed his name to Aytek Konokov, converted to Christianity, received a promise that his village would not be destroyed like the other Circassian villages, and accepted Russian citizenship. However, after seeing the failure of the Russian forces to quickly annex Circassia, he changed sides, returning to Islam and fighting for Circassia.

==== Treaty of Adrianople ====
The Treaty of Adrianople was signed on 14 September 1829. According to the document, Circassia was given by the Ottoman Empire to Russia. However, Circassia was not part of the Ottoman Empire, so it is not clear how this happened. Many, including German economist Karl Marx, criticised this event.

In 1830, an emergency council, attended by representatives from all over Circassia, convened to discuss the treaty. Most Circassian leaders believed the treaty was a hoax, as they believed that the Ottoman Empire would never abandon the Circassians. It was decided to send a delegation to the Ottoman sultan to examine the accuracy of the news.

Seferbiy Zaneqo, Nour Mohammad Haghur, and Tram were selected as delegates. They hoped to meet with the Ottoman caliph to ask the matter and receive a blessing. When they arrived, the Russian ambassador demanded their arrest. Following this, Zaneqo hid while the other two delegates returned to Circassia. After confirming the treaty's legitimacy, the Circassians considered it invalid, arguing that because their territory had been independent of the Ottomans, Istanbul had no right to cede it. Circassian ambassadors were sent to England, France, and Ottoman lands announcing that they deny this treaty under all conditions.

Zaneqo offered the Russians a white peace in which Circassia would remain independent and Russia would leave the region. The Russians wanted the Circassians to surrender unconditionally, but the Circassian stance was clear:

If you decide to continue fighting this war against us, you should know that no power has ever been able to bring our mountains to their knees, and we have never submitted to anyone.

— Seferbiy Zaneqo

Before 1830, Russia maintained a siege line along the Kuban River. There was constant raiding by both sides but no change in borders. Over the following years, Russia gained increasing control of the coast, but this momentum slowed down after the Circassians defeated the Russian army in the Battle of Abinsk in 1834.

In early January 1831, Zaneqo organized several general meetings with Circassian leaders. Among other things, he put forward the idea of a possible reconciliation between the Circassians and Russia, on the stipulation that the Russians retreated behind the Kuban; however, this proposal was rejected.

In 1831, the Russian government considered the destruction of the Natukhaj people in favor of populating their land on the northern coast of the Black Sea with Cossacks. In late 1831, in retaliation for Circassian attacks against Cossack military bases, Russian General Frolov and his task force destroyed several villages. A "horror campaign" began on the night of 20 November, in which villages were surrounded by artillery weapons and shot at. The targets were local homes, as well as mosques. The operation was described in a report:

…In this affair the Russians lost 10 soldiers and had one officer and 16 soldiers wounded. At the scene of the battle there were more than 150 bodies of Circassians killed by bayonets and up to 50 women and children killed from the action of the Russian artillery.

In another report, General Rosen described how his forces captured 381 Circassians (December 1831), and boasted about taking them prisoner and firing at villages, leaving 100 men and 50 women dead. He goes on to detail how when setting fire to a village, a Russian soldier named Midvideiv killed a Circassian who tried to stop him from burning down a mosque.

==== General Zass takes control ====
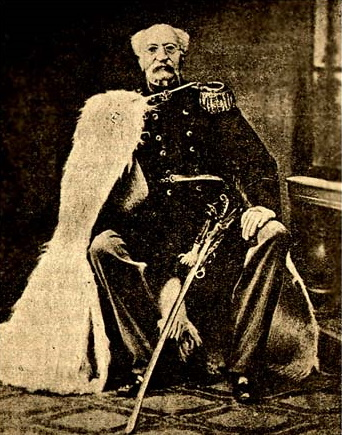
Grigory Zass

Colonel Grigory Zass was a key figure in the Circassian genocide through ethnic cleansing. He operated across all areas of Circassia, but East Circassia was affected the most. It is estimated 70% of the East Circassian population died in the process.

In 1833, Zass was appointed commander of a part of the Kuban Military Line with headquarters in the Batalpashinsk fortress. Zass received wide authority to act as he saw fit. He was a racist who considered Circassians to be an inferior race than Russians and other Europeans. The only way to deal with the Circassians, in his opinion, was to scare them away "just like wild animals". Zass advocated ruthless military methods predicated on this notion, including burning people alive, cutting off heads for enjoyment, burning populated villages to the ground, spreading epidemics on purpose, and mass rape of children. He kept a box under his bed with his collection of severed Circassian body parts.

In August 1833, Zass led his first expedition into Circassian territory, destroying villages and towns. This was followed by a series of other expeditions. He attacked the Besleney region between November and December, destroying most villages, including the village of the double agent Aytech Qanoqo. He continued to exterminate the Circassian population between 1834 and 1835, particularly in the Abzakh, Besleney, Shapsug, and Kabardian regions.

In 1834, Zass sent a report to Rosen detailing his campaign into Circassia. In it, he writes about how he killed three Circassian civilians on their way to fetch grass:

I captured three Circassians from carriages that were on their way to fetch grass, other than the thirteen we already had, who did not wish to surrender to us voluntarily, so I ordered to kill them.

He also writes about how he destroyed a neighborhood:

The savages panicked and started fleeing from their homes, leaving their weapons behind attempting to escape to the forest but most of them were killed by the Cossacks ... with the soldiers lined up ready to fight, the cleansing continued with artillery shells, and I sent there two infantry brigades, but they could only capture 11 more people, and since the fire was in flames in many places, the rest were either killed or burned after attempting to escape by hiding on the roofs of their homes or by the manure. So like this, we destroyed and destructed the neighborhood.

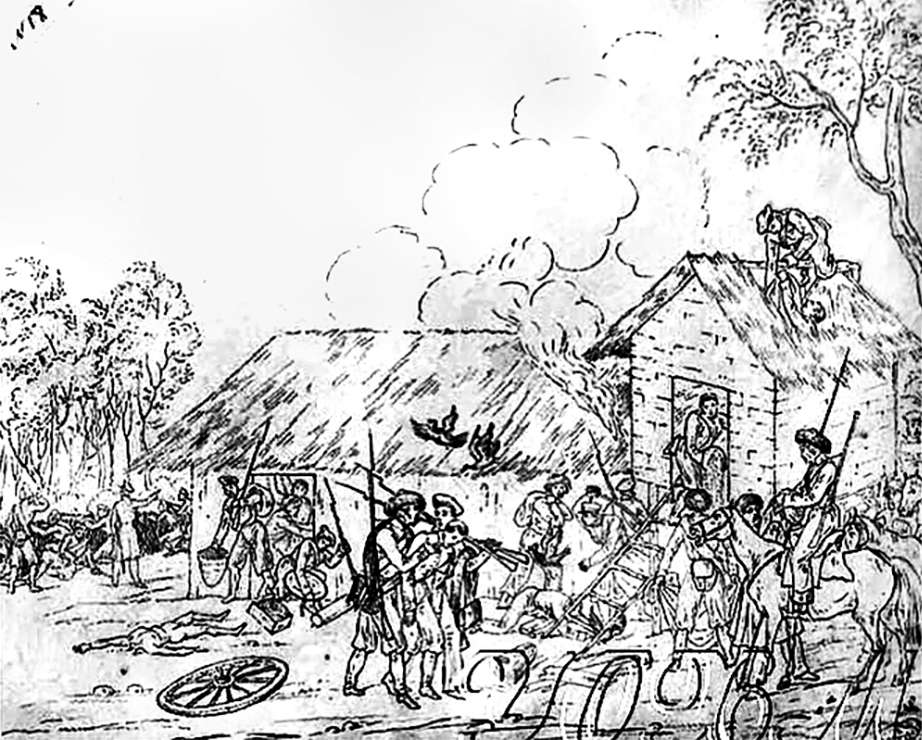
Scene after the attack on a Circassian village, 1830s.

Zass' main strategy was to intercept and retain the initiative, terrorize the Circassians, and destroy Circassian settlements. He paid close attention to his enemy's morale. After a victory, he would usually burn several villages and seize cattle and horses to show off, acts which he proudly admitted. In his reports, he frequently boasted about the destruction of villages and glorified the mass murder of civilians.

In the end of 1836, the Armenians of Circassia declared their allegiance for Russia and begged Zass to locate them a place to live. In 1839, Zass established an Armenian colony in the region that had previously belonged to the Circassians. To make room for the Armenians, Circassian villages and the people who lived in them were destroyed. This year is regarded the official year of Armavir's establishment.

In October 1836, General Zass sent Jembulat Boletoqo word that he would like to make peace. This was a strategy—if Boletoqo came to the Russian fortress for explanation, he would be assassinated; if he did not come, the Russians would claim that he was a warmonger. Prince Boletoqo came to Zass' residency. The general was not there for his first visit, but Zass told him to come at an exact date when he would certainly be in his residency. On his way to the Prochnyi Okop fortress, Boletoqo was killed by a Russian sniper who was hiding in the forest on the Russian bank of the Kuban River at the intersection with the Urup River.

In 1838, Zass spread false rumors about having a serious illness, then staged his own death, thereby weakening the Circassians' vigilance. On the same night, when the Circassians were celebrating their oppressor's death, the suddenly "resurrected" Zass launched a raid that destroyed two villages. He left the Caucasus in 1842.

==== Mission of the Vixen ====
British adventurer James Stanislaus Bell arrived in Circassia by 1836, to provide military aid and medical relief to the Circassians. In November 1836 the Russian military brig Ajax detained his ship, the Vixen, in the port of Sujuk-Qale (now Novorossiysk). At the time of detention, 8 guns, 800 pounds of gunpowder, and a significant number of weapons had already been unloaded from its side. Bell was allowed to leave as he falsely introduced himself as a diplomat, but the ship and the cargo were confiscated for the Russian government and included in the Russian Black Sea fleet.

Left without a ship, Bell remained in Circassia. He did not lose time and helped the Circassians in military affairs. By 1840, with the support of Polish deserters and Circassians trained by Bell, there were several attacks on Russian forts on the Black Sea and Gelendzhik cordon lines. The Circassians employed military tactics taught to them by Bell, such as taking fortifications by storm and using artillery.

==== Naval and shore battles ====
The first naval combat in the war was in May 1834, when the Circassians launched a naval landing near Bombory. In October 1836, seven Circassian galleys attacked the Russian warship Nartsiss. In his report, Russian captain Varnitskiy stated that the Circassians fought in an organized manner, and that the Russians escaped at the last moment as a result of the fierce collision.

Seeking to end the war, the Russians wanted to try another strategy. Most engagements during this subsequent part of the conflict took the form of either (1) amphibious landings on coastal towns in accordance with the directive laid out by the Tsar to secure possible ports, or (2) routings of Circassian forces entrenched in mountain strongholds. On 13 April 1838, Russian forces engaged the Circassian army in the estuary of the Sochi River; on 12 May 1838, the Russians landed a naval invasion at Tuapse, securing the area despite heavy casualties. On the following day, 13 May, when arriving to request permission to remove their dead from the battlefield, a few Circassians leaders were killed.

By this time, Aytech Qanoqo had reformed his army and organized a campaign. After its failure, however, he saw little hope left for Circassia and switched to the Russian side again.

In 1837, some Circassian leaders offered the Russians a white peace, arguing that no more blood should be shed. In response to this offer, the Russian army under the command of General Yermolov burnt 36 Circassian villages.

In February 1838, there was a fierce battle between four Circassian galleys and a Russian ship. The Russian ship was destroyed.

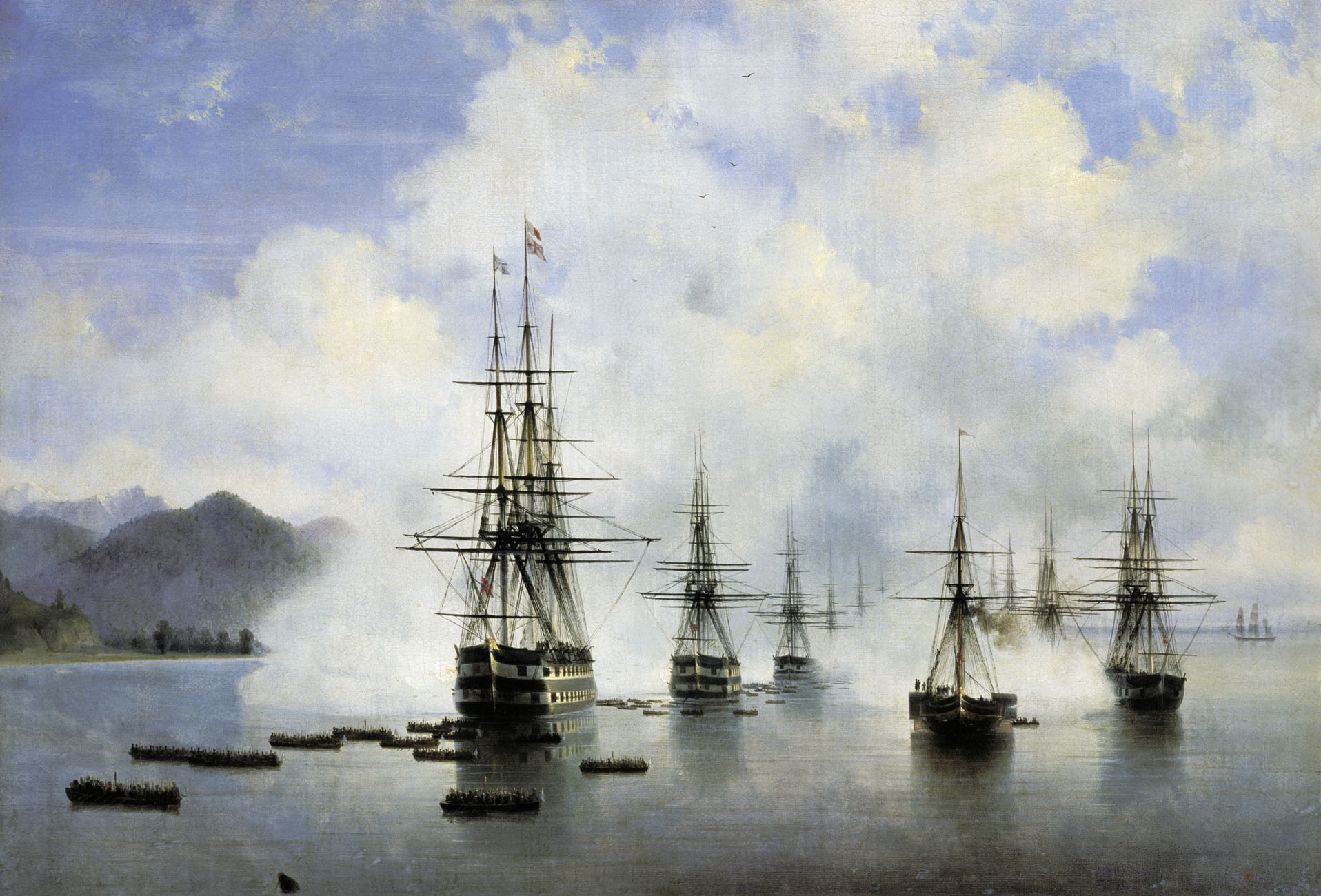
Russian army lands in Subashi

In 1839, Russian forces landed at Subashi (near Sochi) and began construction of a fort, where they faced charges by Ubykh forces who were eventually driven back by shellfire from the Russian navy. Over 1,000 soldiers then charged the Russian positions; however, they were outflanked and overrun as they attempted to retreat. This pattern of attack by the Russian forces went on for several years. Qerzech Shirikhuqo played a big role in reforming and leading the Circassian armies at this time.

==== Final Circassian unification ====
Later in 1839, the Circassians declared Bighurqal (Anapa) as their new capital and Hawduqo Mansur as the leader of the Circassian Confederation. Thus, Circassians were nominally united. The following year, Hawduqo Mansur gave a speech addressing the Circassian nation:

Even if we lose many of our brave warriors, we have men and young boys to replace them! Worst case, we will not be able to use our rifles because we don't have gunpowder and ammo. We will still fight with swords and daggers in our hands! We will never ever bow to the enemies! Even if the whole world leaves us alone and we are cornered to the last point of our country, it will be seen what the Circassians can do. If necessary, we will have to mercifully take the lives of our women and children with our own hands, so that they do not fall into the hands of the enemy and suffer more. And then, to avenge them, we too must perish.

— Hawduqo Mansur

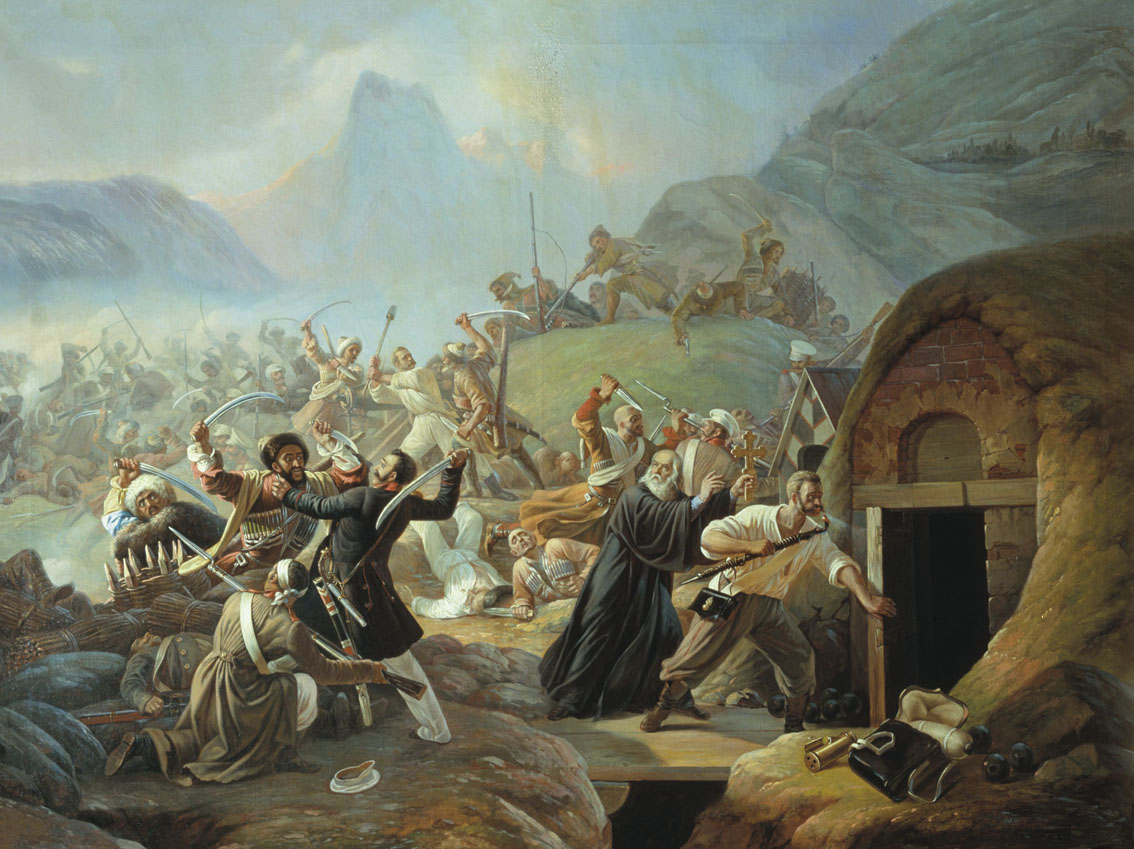
Circassians besiege the Russians at Mikhailovsky fortress on 22 March 1840

The siege of Lazarevsky took place on the night of 7 February 1840. After a 3-hour battle, the fortification was captured and destroyed by the Circassians. Hawduqo Mansur and Ismail Berzeg went on to capture two more forts with an army of 11,000 men, one of them being the siege of Mikhailovksy fort.

In 1841, Circassian commander Ismail Berzeg participated in negotiations with the Russian military leaders in Sochi, but the negotiations ended in vain. The Russian leaders stated that the Circassians were "poor villagers waiting for help from the English". A Russian officer, Lorer, who witnessed Ismail Berzeg's meeting with the Russians, later wrote in his memoirs that Berzeg answered:

I must say, General, your statements truly astound me. If your master, the Tsar, is so wealthy, and we are so poor and barbaric, why does your master envy us and forbid us from living in our humble mountains? Your lord appears to be greedy and lustful. I'm afraid, sir, we won't be surrendering the Englishmen and Turkish pashas in our lands; we can not abandon them because they are our friends and visitors. No amount of gold or silver, I swear to God, will be able to deviate us from the path of honor.

— Ismail Berzeg

In March 1842, the Russians attacked the villages on the plains. Thereupon, Circassians from Abzakh, Shapsug, Ubykh, Hatuqay, Yegeruqway, Chemguy, and Besleney living in the mountains came down from the mountains to help the Circassians exposed to the Russian attacks. In front of the Ferz river, the army of the Russian commander Zass retreated with heavy losses.

In 1844, Aytech Qanoqo again switched sides, and joined Circassia against the Russian forces. On the night of 26 August, he tried to siege the fortress of Colonel Zass, seeking revenge for his destroyed village, but ultimately failed. He was killed in a battle against the Russians on 26 September. Some sources claim he was going to the Russian camp to change sides again but was attacked by the Russians. His body, contrary to tradition, was not removed by the Circassians from the battlefield for janazah (Islamic funeral), and went to the Russians.

==== First two naibs ====
Imam Shamil, the leader of Chechnya and Dagestan, wanted to unite Circassia under Islam, and sent three Sufi naibs for this mission.

The first naib was Haji-Mohammad (1842–1844), who reached Circassia in May 1842. By October he was accepted as leader by the Shapsugs and some of the Natukhajs. The next February, he moved south to Ubykh country but failed because he started a civil war. In the spring of 1844, he was defeated by the Russians, withdrew into the mountains, and died there in May.

The second naib was Suleiman Effendi (1845), who arrived among the Abadzeks in February 1845. His main goal was to raise a Circassian force and to lead it back to Chechnya, but the Circassians did not want to lose their best fighters. After twice failing to lead his recruits through the Russian lines, he surrendered and gave the Russians key information in exchange for money.

==== Muhammad Amin era ====
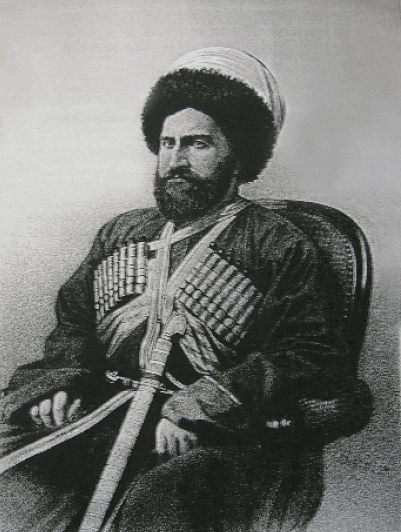
Muhammad Amin

In 1848, an event took place that significantly influenced the history of the Caucasus and the general course of the Russo–Circassian War. Ambassadors came to Imam Shamil from the Abzakh, one of the Circassian regions. They requested that a naib introduce Islam properly and unite the peoples under the banner of the Imamate. Imam Shamil agreed to send Muhammad Amin to lead their struggle against the expansion of Russia. After learning that a warriorlike scholar had arrived, thousands of families moved to the Abzakh region to accept his rule.

Titling himself "Naib", Muhammad Amin assumed full control over Circassia. His absolute rule was accepted by almost all Circassians. By the spring of 1849, the Abzakh, Makhosh, Yegeruqway, and Chemguys declared their allegiance to the Naib; the Shapsugs along the Ubin River also promised to support him with an alliance. The remaining small societies had no power to resist him, and had to obey his orders.

In a short time, Amin succeeded in carrying out reforms in Circassia. He brought the Murtaziq units, previously used in Dagestan, to Circassia with a strategy of releasing prisoners of war in exchange for their conversion to Islam and loyalty. Amin disrupted the general defensive strategy of the Circassians and directed basic attacks against the Russian positions throughout 1849. The Russians, in turn, retaliated more severely against all Circassians.

The Russians, worried about Amin's rise strengthening Circassia, supported the opposition via arms supplies and financial support, as well as promises of high ranks should they topple Amin and submit Circassia to Russia. Despite the protracted war, the opposition, mostly made up of nobles who had lost their power, accepted these proposals. A significant part of the population, especially those who submitted recently, began to ignore the Naib's orders, causing the administrative system of Circassia to collapse.

When the Crimean War started and the Ottomans joined the war against the Russians, Muhammad Amin took advantage of this to reinstate his rule. He managed to regain control in some parts of his former lands, and strengthened his rule further. On 9 October 1853, the Ottoman sultan sent a letter to Imam Shamil and ordered him to declare a holy war against Russia. Amin took it upon himself to lead the Circassian part of this holy war, and started mobilising against Russia. In 1853, Amin gathered a Circassian army consisting of different societies and planned an attack on Russian forts.

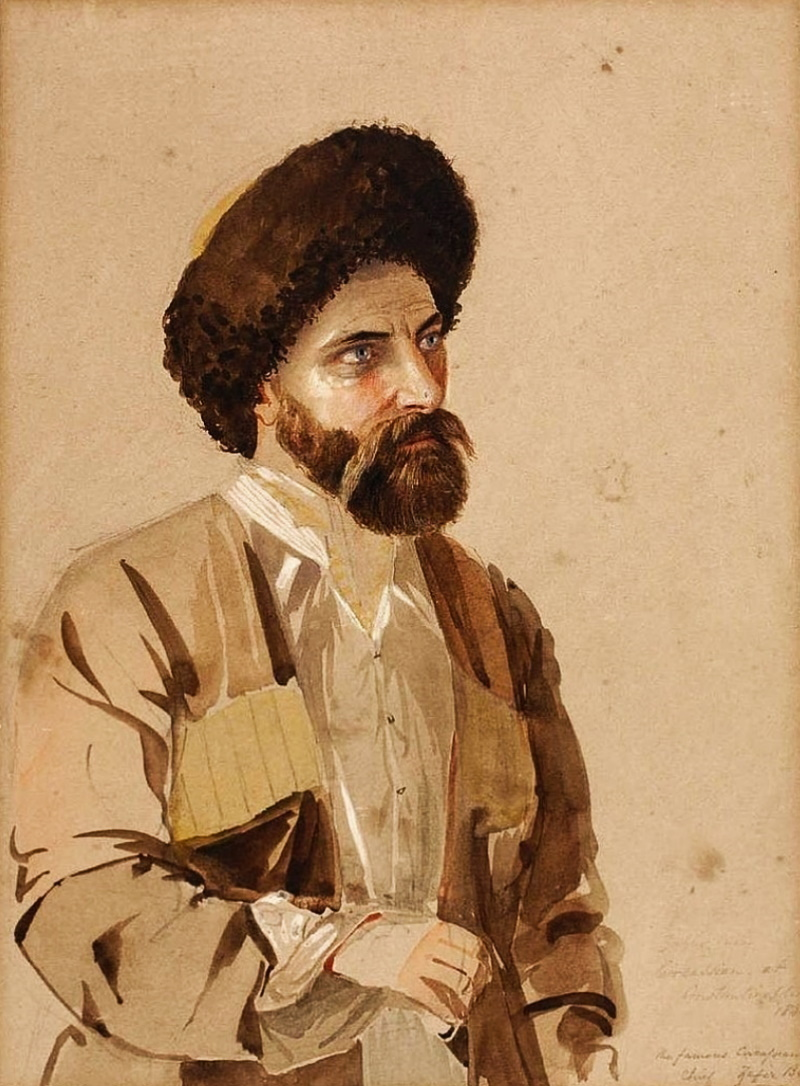
Seferbiy Zaneqo

Meanwhile, the Ottoman Empire, who did not recognize Muhammad Amin as the ruler of Circassia, was preparing to send Seferbiy Zaneqo—a former Circassian commander in the Russo–Circassian War who had declared loyalty to the sultan—to lead Circassia instead. Amin strictly disagreed with this decision; in a letter to the Ottoman grand vizier, he asked the Ottomans to recognize him. Amin's complaint was rejected, and Seferbiy was declared as a pasha and the leader of Circassians.

Amin believed that the Ottomans were actually his enemies attempting to weaken his influence rather than assist him. He went to Varna to declare his worries and went to Istanbul to talk with the Sultan himself. The Sultan, on the condition that he becomes an Ottoman vassal, declared him a pasha as well.

This led to an even more complex situation, as the Ottomans now recognized two different rulers of Circassia. Each one boasted about his own recognition, resulting in rising tensions. In March 1855, near the river of Shebzh, the first battle between Muhammad Amin and Seferbiy Zaneqo took place. In May 1856 another battle took place on the banks of the Sup River. In January 1857, the followers of Amin and Zaneqo fought again near Tuapse, and both sides suffered casualties.

In May 1857, Amin returned to Istanbul. He was then arrested at the request of the Russian ambassador and exiled to Damascus. In September 1857, he escaped and returned to Circassia. He made some final efforts to establish authority, but failed. Russian-backed opposition leaders managed to remove Amin from power. The Naib's army, the Murtaziqs, tried to gain power, but were defeated by the Abzakh opposition. The Russian military, making use of the turmoil, quickly annexed the Abzakh region, but did not keep any of the promises given to the Abzakh opposition leaders. After the annexation of the region, most Abzakh Circassians were forced into a death march in the winter as part of the Circassian genocide.

==== Paris Treaty of 1856 ====
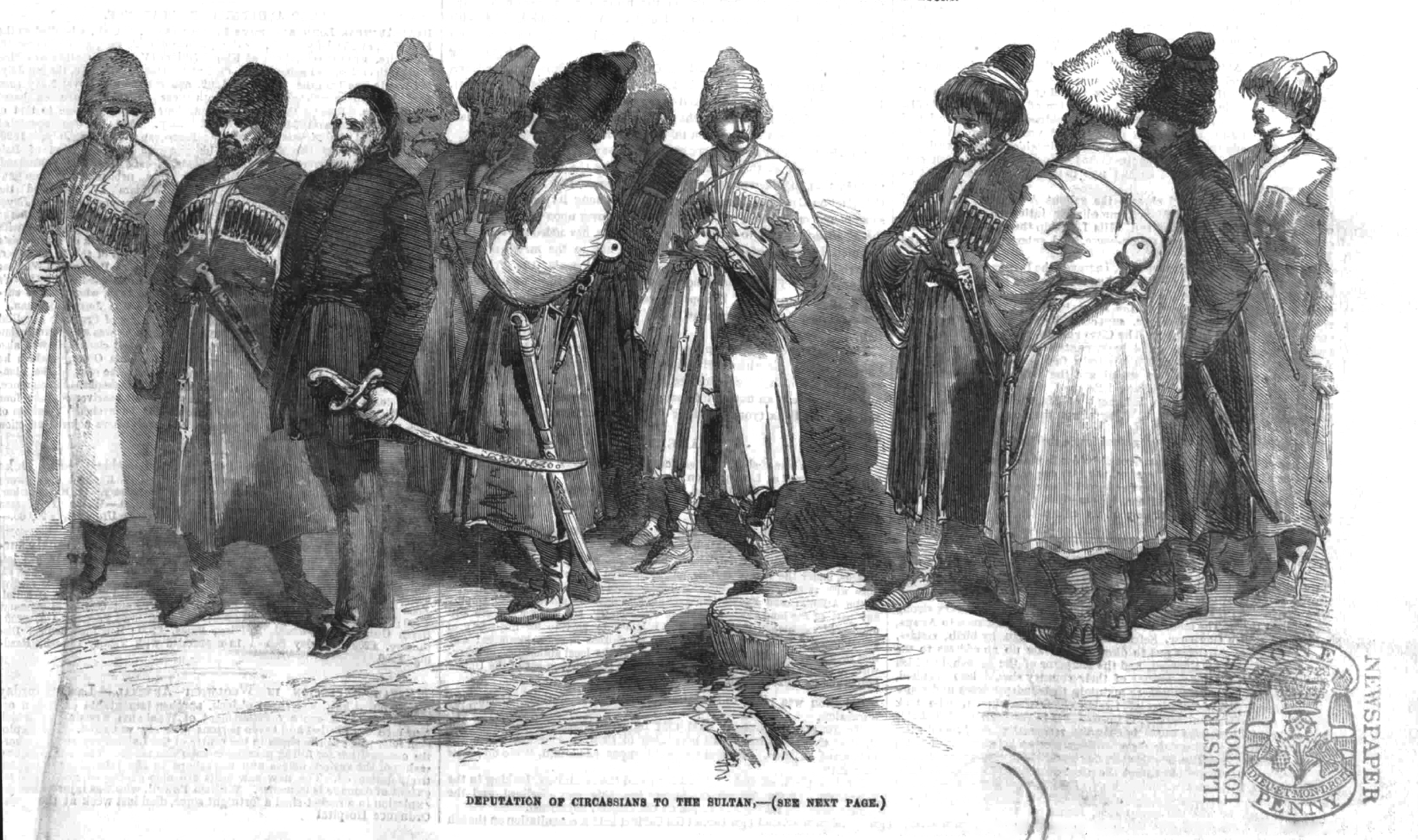
Deputation of Circassians to the Sultan, 1856.

In the Paris Treaty of 1856, British representative Earl of Clarendon insisted that Circassia remain an independent state, but French and Russian representatives wanted to give Circassian lands to Russia. When Clarendon then tried to make the treaty state that Russia could not build forts in Circassia, he was again thwarted by the French representative. The final treaty also extended amnesty to nationals that had fought for enemy powers, but since Circassia had never previously been under Russian control, Circassians were exempt, and thus Circassians were now placed under de jure Russian sovereignty by the treaty, with Russia under no compulsion to grant Circassians the same rights as Russian citizens elsewhere.

=== End of the war ===
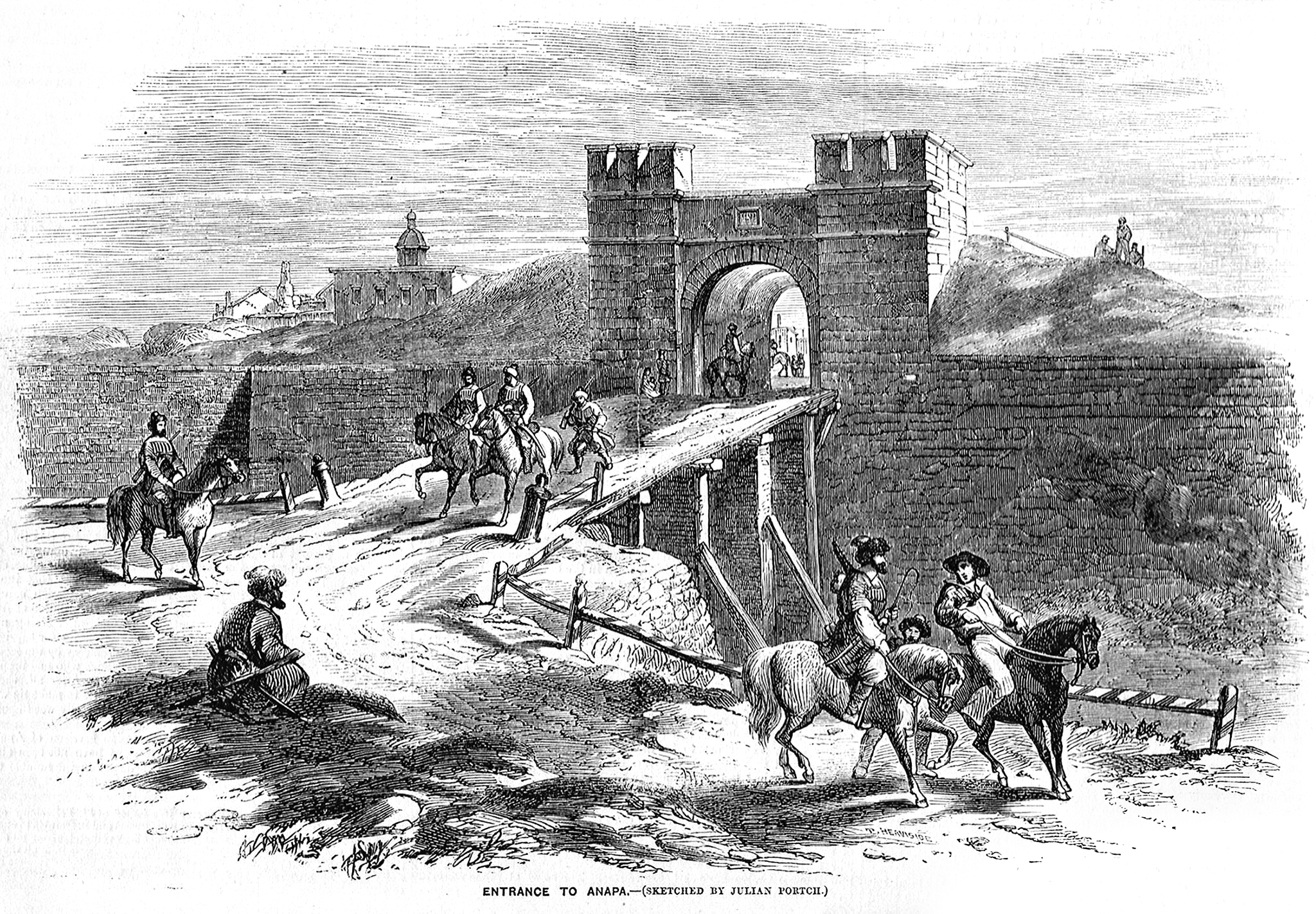
Circassians at the entrance to Anapa, 1855.

In 1854, Circassian forces under the command of Gerandiqo Berzeg set out to recapture areas and forts taken by the Russian army, with partial success. In the Circassian congress convened in Abin in 1857, it was decided to "continue the war against the Russians and be killed, rather than surrender and be killed".

In February 1857, Polish volunteers under the command of Teofil Lapinski arrived in the Caucasus to fight for Circassia. In the same year, Dmitry Milyutin published a document in which he argued that the Circassian people should be exterminated. According to Milyutin, the issue was not to take over the Circassian lands, but to put an end to the Circassians. Rostislav Fadeyev supported the proposal, saying: "It is not possible to tame the Circassians, if we destroy half of them completely, the other half will lay down their weapons." In May 1859, elders from the Bjedugh negotiated a peace with the Russian Empire and submitted to the Tsar. Other societies soon submitted to the Russians, including the Abadzekhs on 20 November 1859. By 1860 the Russians had seventy thousand soldiers in Circassia.

Gerandiqo Berzeg

According to Ivan Drozdov, the Russian army generally preferred to indiscriminately destroy areas where Circassians resided. In September 1862, after attacking a Circassian village and seeing some of its inhabitants flee into the forest, General Yevdokimov continuously bombarded the forest for six hours and ordered his men to kill every living thing; he then set the forest on fire to ensure no survivors remained. Drozdov reported to have overheard Circassian men taking vows to sacrifice themselves to the cannons to allow their family and rest of their villages to escape, and later received reports of groups of Circassians doing so.

As part of an operation launched from the autumn of 1863, Circassian villages and their supplies were to be burned, and this process was repeated until General Yevdokimov was convinced that all inhabitants of the region had died.

The remaining Circassians established the Circassian Parliament in the capital city of Ş̂açə (Sochi) on 25 June 1861. Gerandiqo Berzeg was appointed as the head of the parliament. This parliament asked for help from Europe, arguing that they would be forced into exile soon.

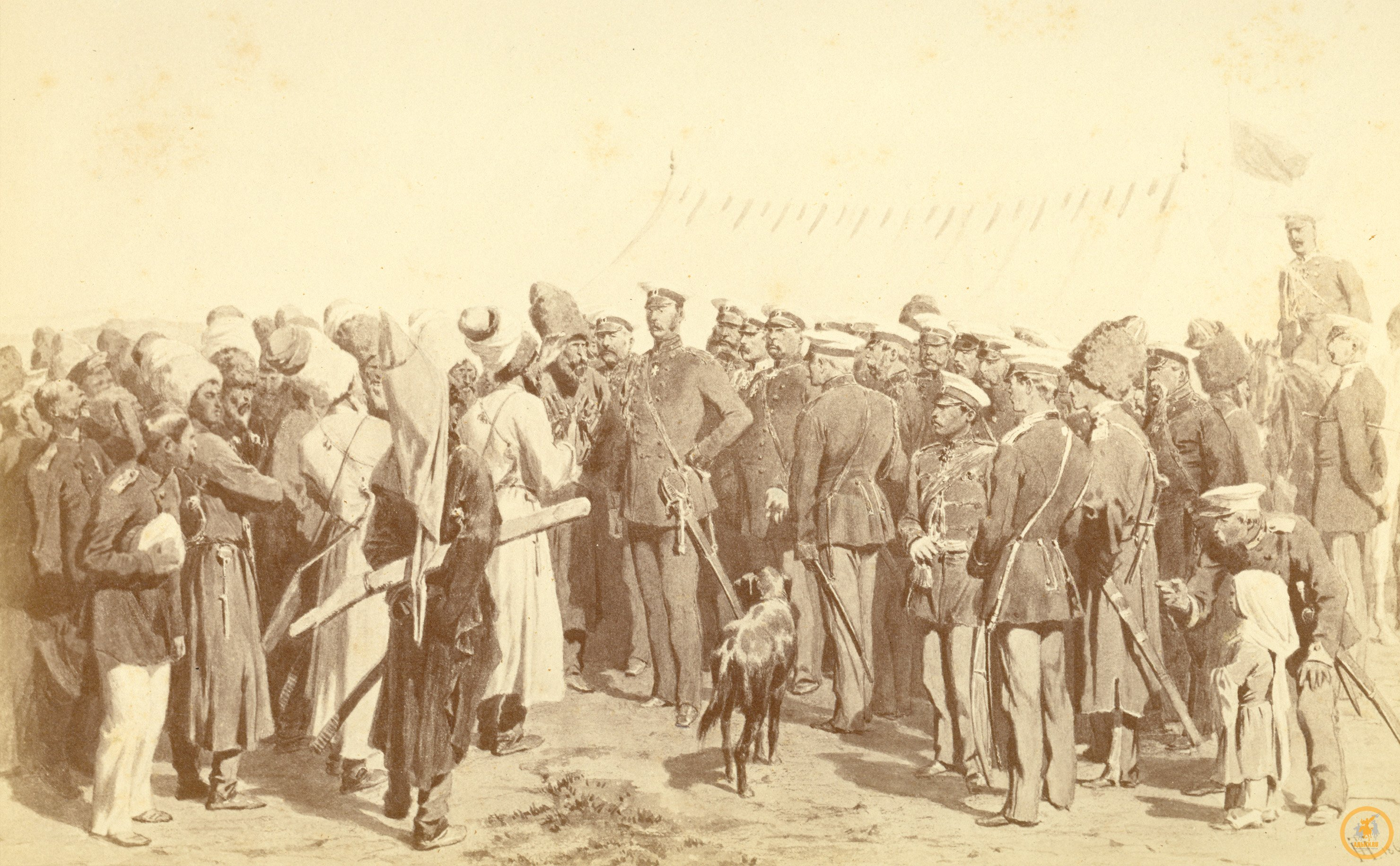
Delegation of Circassians to Emperor Alexander II in 1861 drawn by Theodor Horschelt.

The Circassian Parliament negotiated with the Russian Tsar Alexander II in September 1861 to establish peace, expressing their readiness to accept Russian citizenship. After being convinced by his generals, the Russian Tsar declared that not only would Circassia be annexed by Russia unconditionally, but the Circassians would also be forced to migrate to Turkey and other foreign lands; Russian generals would be tasked with killing any remaining Circassians. He gave the Circassian representatives a month to decide. Soon after, Russian General Kolyobakin invaded Sochi and destroyed the parliament; no other government publicly opposed this.

On 9 April 1864, "A Petition from Circassian leaders to Her Majesty Queen Victoria" was signed by the Circassians. The document requests British military aid, or at least humanitarian aid, to the Circassian people. It reads:

In the name of God, the Most Compassionate, the Most Merciful.

Our most humble Petition to Her Magnificent Majesty the Queen and Emperor of England is to the effect that –

It is now more than eighty years since the Russian Government is unlawfully striving to subdue and annex to its dominions Circassia, which since the creation of the world has been our home and our country. It slaughters like sheep the children, helpless women, and old men that fall into its hands. It rolls about their heads with the bayonet like melons, and there is no act of oppression or cruelty which is beyond the pale of civilisation and humanity, and which defies description, that it has not committed.

We have not, from father to son, at the cost of our lives and properties, refrained from opposing the tyrannical acts of that Government in defence of our country, which is dearer to us than our lives. But during the last year or two it has taken advantage of a famine caused by a drought with which the Almighty visited us, as well as by its own ravages, and it has occasioned us great distress by its severe attacks by sea and land. Many are the lives which have been lost in battle, from hunger in the mountains, from destitution on the sea-coast, and from want of skill at sea.

We therefore invoke the mediation and precious assistance of the British Government and people – the guardian of humanity and centre of justice – to repel the brutal attacks of the Russian Government on our country, and save our country and our nation together.

But if it is not possible to afford this help for the preservation of our country, and race, then we pray to be afforded facilities for removing to a place of safety our helpless and miserable children and women that are perishing by the brutal attacks of the enemy as well as by the effects of famine; and if neither of these two requests are taken into consideration, and if in our helpless condition we are utterly annihilated notwithstanding our appeals to the mercy and grace of the Governments, then we shall not cease to invoke our right in the presence of the Lord of the Universe, of Him who has confided to Your Majesty sovereignty, strength, and power for the purpose of protecting the weak.

We beg Your Excellency (Sir Henry Bulwer) to be the medium of making known to the great British Government and to the glorious British nation our condition of helplessness and misery, and we have therefore ventured to present to Your Excellency our most humble petition. A copy of it has been submitted to the Sultan's Government and to the Embassies of other Powers.

Signed by the People of Circassia. 29 Sheval, 1280 (April 7, 1864)

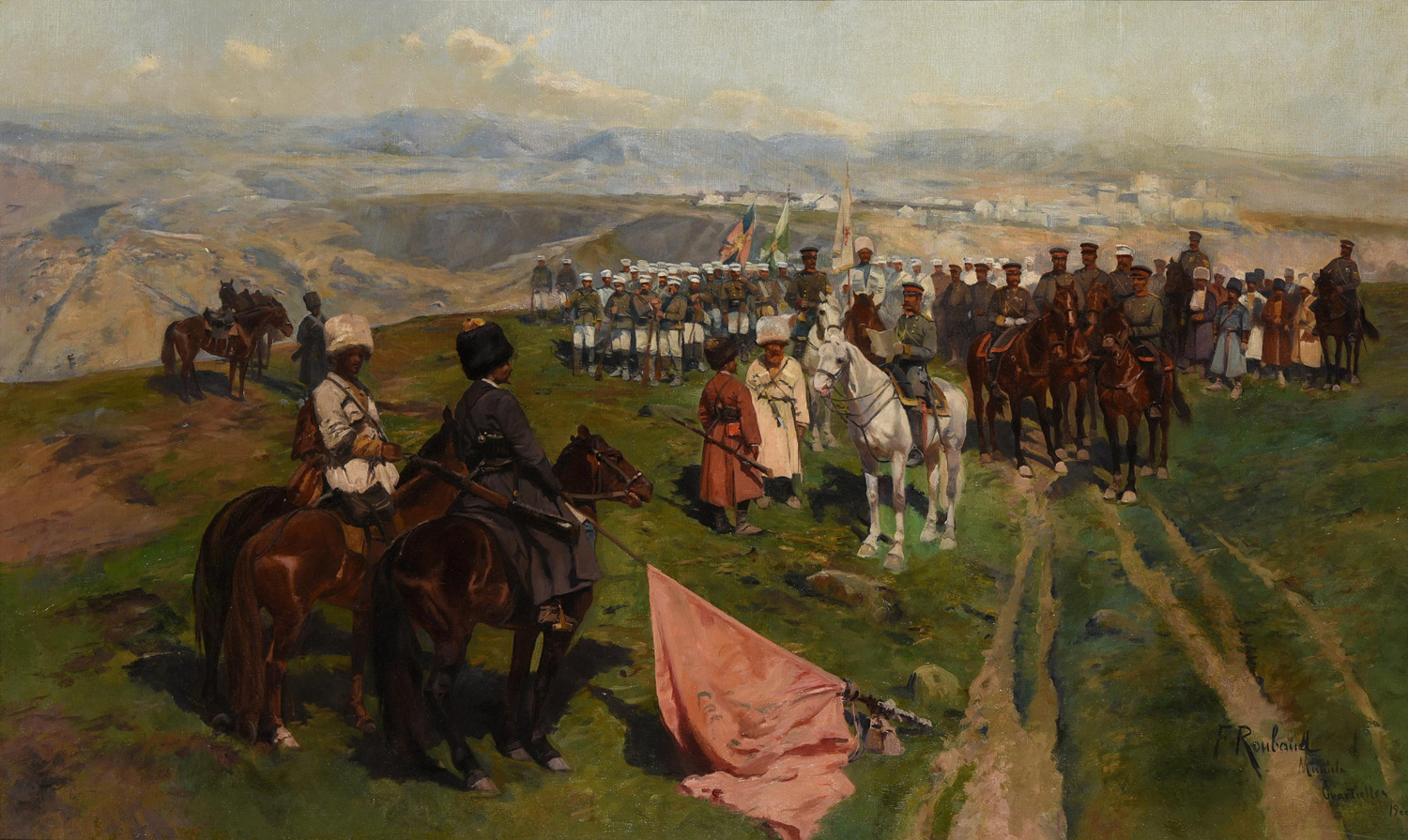
Announcement of the end of the war by Grand Duke Mikhail Nikolaevich painted by Franz Roubaud.

In March 1864, a surrounded Circassian army refused to surrender and committed mass suicide. Around the same time, a final battle took place in Qbaada between the Circassian army of 20,000 men and women, consisting of local villagers and militia as well as tribal horsemen, and a Russian army of 100,000 men, consisting of Cossack and Russian horsemen, infantry, and artillery. The Russian forces advanced from four sides. Circassian forces tried to break the line, but many were hit by Russian artillery and infantry before they managed to reach the front. The remaining fighters continued to fight as militants and were soon defeated. The Russian army began celebrating victory on the corpses, and a military-religious parade was held, as 100 Circassian warriors were publicly mutilated in a public execution to establish authority. The Russian army began raiding and burning Circassian villages, destroying fields to prevent return, cutting down trees, and driving the people to the Black Sea coast.

After 101 years of resistance, essentially all of Circassia fell into Russian hands; the only exception were the Hakuchey, who lived in the mountainous regions and continued their resistance until the 1870s.

After the war, Russian General Yevdokimov was tasked with forcing the surviving Circassian inhabitants to relocate outside of the region, primarily in the Ottoman Empire. This policy was enforced by mobile columns of Russian riflemen and Cossack cavalry.

=== Expulsion and genocide ===
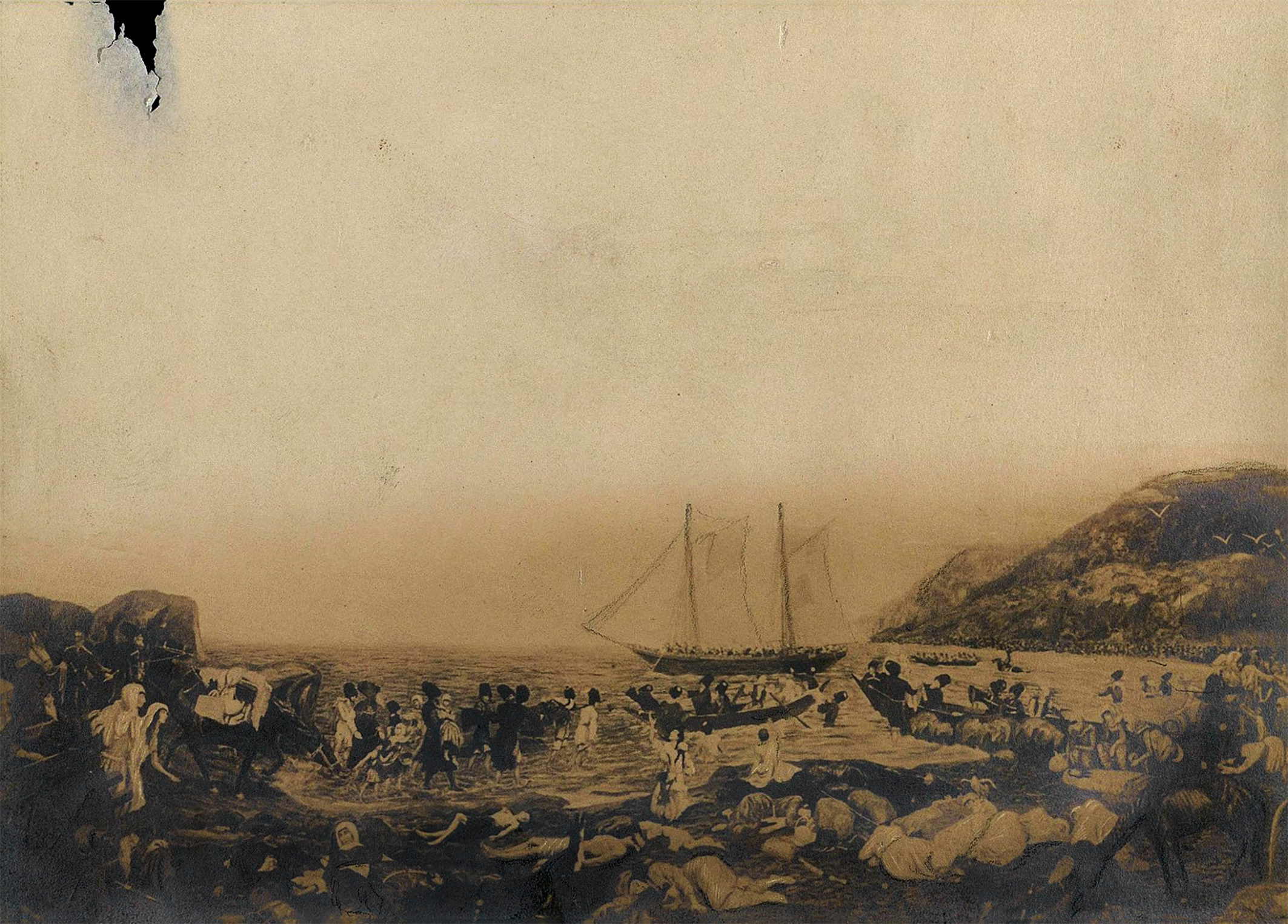
A Circassian Camp Near Novorossiysk.

The Circassian genocide was the Russian Empire's systematic mass murder, ethnic cleansing, forced migration, and expulsion of Circassians from their homeland of Circassia, which roughly encompassed the major part of the North Caucasus and the northeast shore of the Black Sea. Between 95 and 97 percent of the total Circassian population were slaughtered or forcibly expelled from their homeland; and approximately 1 to 2 million Circassian natives were mass murdered during the genocide.

As many as 1 to 1.5 million Circassians were forced to flee, but less than half survived. Ottoman archives show nearly 1 million migrants entering their land from the Caucasus by 1879, with nearly half of them dying on the shores as a result of diseases. If these archives are correct, it was the biggest exile of the 19th century. Corroborating the archives, the Russian census of 1897 records only 150,000 Circassians, one tenth of the original number, remaining in the conquered region.

90% of people with Circassian descent now live in other countries, primarily in Turkey, Jordan, and other countries of the Middle East, with only 500,000–700,000 remaining in what is now Russia.

== See also ==
- Caucasian War
- Circassian genocide
- Russian conquest of Chechnya and Dagestan
- David Urquhart

== Sources ==
- Ahmed, Akbar (2013). The Thistle and the Drone: How America's War on Terror Became a Global War on Tribal Islam. Washington, D.C.: Brookings Institution Press. ISBN 978-0-8157-2379-0.
- Baddeley, John F. (1908). The Russian conquest of the Caucasus. London: Longmans, Green and Co. ISBN 0-7007-0634-8. OL 3428695M.
- Henze, Paul B. (1992). "Circassian resistance to Russia". In Bennigsen Broxup, Marie (ed.). The North Caucasus Barrier: The Russian Advance Towards The Muslim World (PDF). London: C Hurst & Co. pp. 266 (also New York: St. Martin's Press, 252 pp.). Archived from the original (PDF) on 29 March 2007.
- Karpat, Kemal H. (1985). Ottoman Population, 1830–1914: Demographic and Social Characteristics. Madison, Wisconsin, USA: University of Wisconsin Press. ISBN 0-299-09160-0.
- King, Charles (2008). The Ghost of Freedom: A History of the Caucasus. New York City: Oxford University Press. ISBN 978-0-19-517775-6.
- Mackie, John Milton (1856). Life of Schamyl: and narrative of the Circassian War of independence against Russia. Michigan. ISBN 1-4255-2996-8.
- Мальбахов, Б. К. (2002). Кабарда на этапах политической истории (середина XVI — первая четверть XIX века). Москва: «Поматур». ISBN 5-86208-106-2.
- Messenger, Evan (6 December 2023). "The Circassian Genocide: The Forgotten Tragedy of the First Modern Genocide". American University: Journal of International Service. Archived from the original on 23 February 2024.
- Neumann, Karl Friedrich (1840). Russland und die Tscherkessen (pdf) (in German). Stuttgart und Tübingen: J. G. Cotta – via Internet Archive.
- Richmond, Walter (2008). "Chapter 4 (excerpt)". The Northwest Caucasus: Past, Present, Future. Routledge. ISBN 978-0-415-77615-8. Archived from the original on 27 September 2007.
- Richmond, Walter (9 April 2013a). The Circassian Genocide. Rutgers University Press. ISBN 978-0-8135-6068-7.
- Shenfield, Stephen D. (1999). "The Circassians: A Forgotten Genocide?". In Levene, Mark; Roberts, Penny (eds.). The Massacre in History. New York: Berghahn Books. pp. 149–162. ISBN 978-1-57181-935-2.
- Tsutsiev, Arthur, Atlas of the Ethno-Political History of the Caucasus, 2014
- Vedeneyev, D. (1994). "77 тысяч". Rodina (3–4). Moscow.
