= Boris Bursać =

Serbian politician

Boris Bursać (Serbian Cyrillic: Борис Бурсаћ; born 1989) is a politician in Serbia. He has served in the National Assembly of Serbia since October 2020 as a member of the Serbian Progressive Party.

== Private career ==
Bursać lives in Belgrade and is a master manager by educational training. He has published articles on the subject of terrorism.

== Politician ==
Bursać is chair of the youth council of the Progressive Party's municipal board in Zemun. He was awarded the 195th position on the party's Aleksandar Vučić — For Our Children electoral list for the 2020 Serbian parliamentary election and narrowly missed direct election when the list won a landslide majority with 188 of 250 mandates. He received a mandate on 28 October 2020 as the replacement for another party member. Bursać is the leader of Serbia's parliamentary friendship group with Mozambique and a member of the friendship groups with Armenia, Israel, Montenegro, Russia, the United Kingdom, and the United States of America.
