= Fyodor Bursak =

Russian Imperial General

Fyodor Yakovlevich Bursak
- Фёдор Яковлевич Бурсак
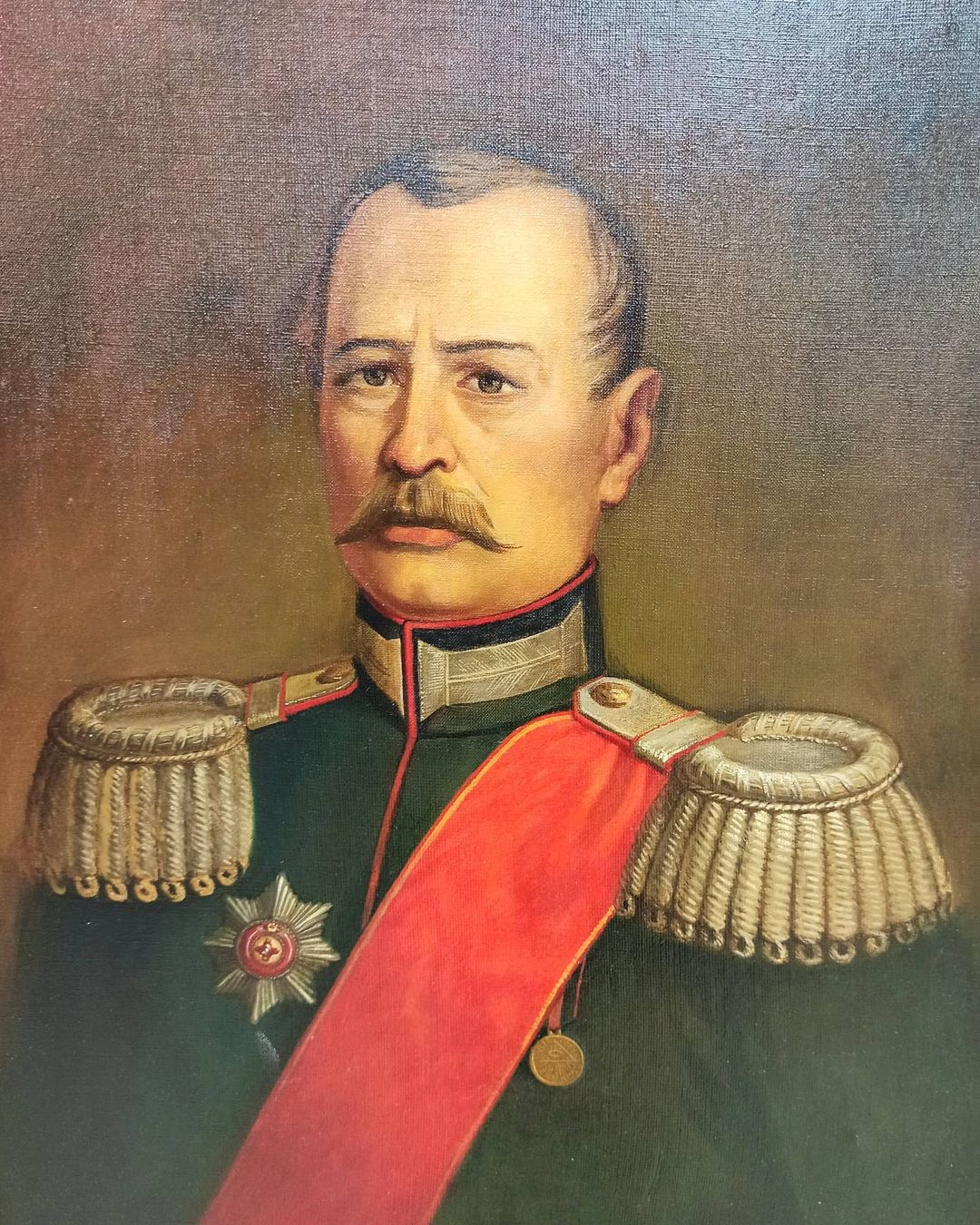
- Born: 1750
- Died: 1827 (aged 76–77)
- Military career
- Service years: 1768–1816
- Nickname: Ruthless general
- Conflicts: Russo-Circassian War; Russo-Turkish War (1768–1774); Russo-Turkish War (1787–1792); Russo-Turkish War (1806–1812)
- Awards: Order of Saint Anna

Fyodor Yakovlevich Bursak (1750–1827) was a Russian Imperial General and an ataman (Cossack military chieftain) of the Black Sea Cossack Host. Known as a ruthless general with no mercy, he took an active part in the Circassian genocide.

== Biography ==
Born in 1750 in the noble family of Antonovich in the Kharkiv region, he studied at Kiev.

He participated as an ordinary Cossack raider in the Russian-Turkish War of 1768–1774. His success in raids promoted him in ranks.

With the settlement of the Black Sea troops in the Kuban, on December 22, 1799, he was appointed ataman in the border with Circassia. He immediately organized a number of raids against the Circassians, and personally ordered his men to burn all Circassian villages they see, even if they are villages that are loyal to the Russian Empire.

He died and was buried in 1827 near the military cathedral on the Fortress Square of the Yekaterinodar Fortress.
