= Aytech Qanoqo =

Circassian military commander

Qanoqo Aytech Aytek Konokov
- Born: Circassia
- Died: 1844; Circassia
- Military career
- Allegiance: Russia; Circassia; Ottoman Empire
- Conflicts: Russo-Circassian War

Aytech Qanoqo (Kabardian: Къанокъуэ Айтэч, romanized: Qanoqwə Aytəç; Russian: Айтек Коноков; ? - September 26, 1844) was a Circassian military commander, nobleman and double agent who took part in the Russo-Circassian War.

== Biography ==
=== Early life ===
Due to the rise of democratic factions in Circassia with the Circassian Revolution, and some regions abandoning social classes, he lost his status as a noble and initially supported the Russian invasion of Circassia to keep his noble titles. In 1828, he arrived at the Russian camp, where he took an oath of allegiance to the Russian Empire, changed his name to Aytek Konokov, converted to Christianity, took promise that his village would not be destroyed like the other Circassian villages, and accepted Russian citizenship. Despite this, he kept fighting against Russia. As a result, in 1833, Russian general Grigory Zass completely destroyed his village, killed most inhabitants, captured 68 prisoners and destroyed the stocks of hay and bread. After this, Qanoqo tried to defeat Zass, but failed. After this failure, he saw little hope left for Circassia and switched to the Russian side again.

Until 1844, Qanoqo served as a general in the Russian army. Later that year, Qanoqo again switched sides, and fought against Russian forces. On the night of August 26, he tried to siege the fortress of Grigory Zass, ultimately seeking revenge for his destroyed village, but failed.

=== Death ===
On September 26, 1844, he was killed by a Russian patrol near a Russian camp. His body, contrary to tradition, was not removed by the Circassians from the battlefield for an Islamic funeral (janāzah) and was left for the Russians to pick up, but the Russians did not take the body either.
