= Cherchenay =

Eastern Bzhedugia

The tamga of the Akhedjaguqo princely branch ruling Cherchenay

Cherchenay (Adyghe: Чэрчэнай, romanized: Çərçənay), also known as the Eastern Bzhedugia, was a subdivision of the Bzhedugia region that was ruled by the Cherchan princely dynasty.

According to oral tradition, the princely dynasty that ruled the Bzhedug tribe of the Circassians split into four branches. Bagharsiqu and Basteqo migrated with their villagers to different parts of Circassia, founding the Mahosh and Chopsin tribes, while Khimish and Cherchan remained, governing the western and eastern parts of Bzhedug; the eastern region under Cherchan rule was known as Cherchenay.
