= Religion in Circassia =

Religious beliefs in Circassia

Religion in Circassia refers to religious presence in historical Circassia and modern-day Adygea, Kabardino-Balkaria, Krasnodar Krai and Karachai-Cherkessia. The majority of ethnic Circassians today are Muslim while a minority retain Orthodox Christian or pagan beliefs. Historically, Circassians were predominantly Christians from the 3rd century to the 16th century, and later they gradually began converting to Islam.

== History ==
Circassia gradually went through following various religions: Paganism, Christianity, and then Islam.

=== Paganism ===
A Zichian wheel, representing the articulation of the universe from the center.

Before encountering Abrahamic religions, the Circassians believed in their traditional religion. The foundation of this religion is the worship of the chief god, Thashkho (Adyghe: Тхьэшхо, lit. 'Great God'). Some classify this religion as polytheistic, while others as monotheistic. Thashkho has attributes such as "needed by all, but needing no one," "creating from nothing, the multiplier," and "allowing the cycle of the universe."

All beings are essentially one and part of an eternal cycle; only Thashkho, the creator, is unaffected by this cycle. Prayers to Thashkho were made as "Good God, we wretches pray to you." Thashkho also has lesser deities subordinate to him. The beginning of the world is associated with the formation of the great emptiness or the universe (Adyghe: Хы). Thashkho created the universe and order, and the rest developed spontaneously. The symbol of the Circassian religion is the T symbol.

According to Leonti Lyulye, who traveled through Circassia, in the Circassian belief, souls were rewarded after death according to their deeds on earth. Therefore, the purpose of human earthly existence was the soul's perfection. An important element was the spirit of the ancestors. The spirits of the ancestors required commemoration: funeral feasts were held, and sacrifices or memorial meals were prepared and distributed in memory of the deceased souls.

Before the Middle Ages, there were trade relations between the Circassians and the Greeks. The Circassian forest goddess Mezitha and the Greek forest god Pan are roughly the same person. The name of the Circassian bee goddess Merisse means "bee" in Greek. Other similarities can be found between Greek and Circassian beliefs: Greek mythology contains references to Circassia (such as Prometheus chained to Mount Elbrus). Some have even claimed that this mythology originated in Circassia.

Edmund Spencer described the traditional religion of the Circassians as follows:

The principal articles in the faith of the inhabitants of the Western Caucasus are,—a firm belief in one God, supreme and powerful, and in the immortality of the soul, which they feel convinced will be translated to another world, the abode of their fathers.

Like the Mahometans (Muslims), they do not represent the Deity under any visible form, but define him as the Creator of all things, whose spirit is diffused over all space.

Besides the one Eternal God, they believe in the existence of several inferior beings, or saints, to whom the Great Spirit, Thka, has delegated power over such sublunary things as he deems too trivial for his awful superintendence. These saints have each an anniversary, which is celebrated with public rejoicing and prayer, in the same manner as festivals are in Catholic countries. Some of them are represented under a peculiar symbol; but they do not worship them, except as intermediate agents.

Upon this subject I made strict inquiry, and found that all my informants agreed as to this point, and which confirmed what I had previously heard from several Russian officers, who had been for many years in communication with the Circassians. Nevertheless, this worship must be regarded as a species of adoration by the strict Protestant and the equally rigid Mahometan.

Circassians had a tradition of burying the dead in high places. German traveler Johannes Schiltberger, who passed through Circassian lands in 1427, wrote the following:

They (the Circassians) have a tradition of placing those who died from lightning strikes in coffins and hanging them from a tall tree. After this, neighbors arrive with food and drink. They begin dancing, partying, slaughtering oxen and rams, and distributing most of the meat to the poor. They do this for three days, repeating the process year after year until the bodies have completely decomposed. They consider the person struck by lightning to be a saint.

Turkish traveler Evliya Çelebi wrote:

After performing various rituals, the storytellers gather people at the deceased's bedside. This is a surprising and rare sight. They then place the deceased in a special coffin, perched on the branches of a large tree in the mountains.

Sultan Barquq, the Circassian Mamluk ruler of medieval Egypt, was also buried in accordance with Circassian tradition; the coffin containing his body was hung from the ceiling of the mosque by the Circassian community.

The most important deities were:

- Mezytha (god of the forests) – controlled the fate of wild animals and dictated success in the hunt.
- Zeykutkh (god of horsemanship) – served as the patron deity of riding and equestrians, though he lacked a clearly defined physical form.
- Psykhe-Guasha (princess of the waters) – a maiden deity who ruled over and protected bodies of water.
- Ahin (patron of cattle) – ranked among the most vital deities; a prominent myth details the sacred, "self-walking" sacrificial cow of Akhina.
- Sozeresh (patron of agriculture and fertility) – manifested physically as a domestic idol kept in family barns, fashioned from a seven-knotted branch of *hamshkhut* wood.
- Emish (patron of sheep breeding) – explicitly venerated during autumn ritual cycles coinciding with the mating season of rams.

Concurrently, the Circassians recognized and revered a supreme creator deity of the universe: the great Thashkho. Their theological practices strictly eschewed human sacrifice or the consumption of sacrificial blood. Beyond the central pantheon, Circassians venerated semi-divine figures and the Narts—the mythic heroes around whom the folklore created the heroic world of the Nart epic. Among these, the most widely celebrated was Sosruqo. On a specific winter night, families hosted lavish feasts in his honor, setting out the finest delicacies in the guest room for the hero, alongside fresh oats and hay in the stable for his magical steed. Any random traveler who happened upon the home that night was welcomed and feasted in Sosruqo's stead.

Another prominent figure, Tlepsh, was highly revered by blacksmiths as the master of fire, metalworking, and weapons; the community also petitioned him during ritual vigils to heal wounds and alleviate illness. As Islam began to penetrate the region, the imagery surrounding many of these traditional saints and epic heroes was gradually adapted by polytheistic Circassians into the mythos of heroic Arab warriors and Islamic legends.

In the late 16th century, Ottoman geopolitical expansion into the region intensified, executed primarily through their regional vassals—the Crimean Khans. This period marked the systematic conquest of various tribes across the western and central Caucasus, accompanied by the active propagation and mass adoption of Islam. Nevertheless, the Ottoman traveler Evliya Celebi observed in the late 17th century that many Circassians merely adopted Islamic identities nominally while practicing traditional ancestral rites, and noted that several isolated tribes had not converted to the new faith at all.

==== Holy places (groves and trees) ====
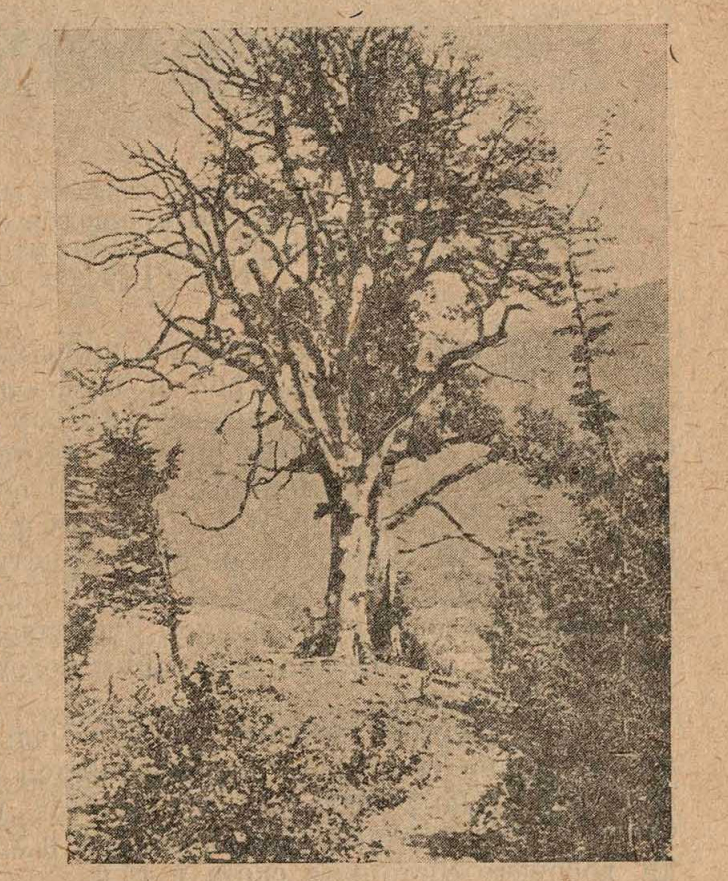
Two sacred oak trees in Tuapse. The pagan Shapsugs used to pray in front of these trees. The one in front was withered by the Russian authorities.

Numerous accounts from Western writers beginning in the 17th century firmly document the Circassians' deep veneration of sacred groves. Among them, the Dominican missionary Giovanni Luca (1637) described these sacred spaces, locally known as *kudoshi*, where weapons and the heads of sacrificed rams were hung prominently from branches. Later, the diplomat Claude-Charles de Peyssonnel (1787) documented a sacred tree named panjassan located "in the center of Circassia," noting that the local population held a reverence for it that bordered on idolatry. The consul and traveler Taitbout de Marigny corroborated this widespread veneration of groves, observing that during internal community feuds, a dissatisfied faction could choose to secede and establish an independent sacred grove of their own. Conversely, during inter-communal warfare, attackers occasionally desecrated their opponents' shrines despite sharing identical spiritual beliefs. Similarly, the English diplomat James Stanislaus Bell (1840) encountered revered trees and groves throughout the Pshada and Dzhubga river valleys; visitors regularly adorned these branches with fabric rags, both as religious offerings and as symbolic rituals to transfer and bind the illnesses of those seeking healing to the trees.

A highly detailed record is preserved in the 1724 text, Description of Circassia, compiled by Xaverio Glavani, French consul in the Crimea and first physician to the Khan, in Bakhchisarai, January 20, 1724:

"Each district of Circassia has a special sacred place, usually located in the forest, where the object of worship is a large tree. The Circassians call such a tree "penekassan." They perform their prayers before it. The dying leave a sabre, a gun, and clothing to the penekassan. These objects are ceremoniously carried there and hung on the trees, so that over time the forest becomes filled with all manner of weapons, clothing, and other items. But no one dares touch them. The dead are buried in this forest, and rituals are performed. If men and women who have committed a crime hide in the "penekassan" forest and tie a piece of cloth from among those hanging on the trees around their necks, they are exempt from punishment, as they are under the protection of a deity. It has been known for Turks enslaved by the Circassians to gain their freedom by placing themselves under the protection of the "penekassan." It should be noted, however, that slaves and criminals enjoy a certain freedom and immunity only as long as the piece of cloth they tied around their necks remains. The slaves, without waiting for the bandage to completely fall apart from wear and tear, having gained their freedom, hasten to leave the region."

These foreign accounts align precisely with observations made by Russian ethnographers from the 1860s onward. For instance, the Natukhai tribe, one of the primary Circassian subdivisions that were deported to the Ottoman Empire following the conclusion of the Caucasian War in 1864, held the ancient groves of the Baku Gorge (a tributary of the Adagum River) in exceptionally high esteem. Tribal customary law strictly forbade the removal of a single branch, leaf, or any weapon or item suspended from the canopy.

In the Pshada River valley, the Natukhais similarly venerated a massive tree that had once been struck by lightning. This site was widely believed to possess miraculous powers to cure fevers. Afflicted individuals traveled to the tree with ritual offerings—primarily traditional pies—which were immediately consumed by the companions accompanying the sick. Before departing, a small splinter or piece of bark from the tree was sewn into a cloth pouch and placed permanently around the patient's neck as an amulet, while the remaining fabric was tied to the branches as a reciprocal offering, leaving the entire tree festooned with cloth.

The archives of the Krasnodar Regional Museum include historical collections of bark and wood fragments gathered from lightning-struck trees. These remnants were traditionally utilized in rainmaking rituals during severe droughts and for medicinal purposes. Patients wore them on their backs to alleviate illness and, upon recovery, returned to hang symbolic scraps of fabric on the specific lightning-scarred tree. Far from being a distant antiquity, this practice persisted among the lowland Circassian communities well into the late 19th century.

In the Adyheko tract along the Ilbzhi River (a right tributary of the Afips, located within the territory of the Greater Shapsugs), the local population maintained a *tkha-chig* (god's tree), a sacred grove composed of centuries-old lindens and plane trees known as *tkhamakha* ("dedicated to God"). This historical sanctuary was systematically destroyed by Imperial Russian troops in 1863 during the construction of a military redoubt. In earlier eras, the Shapsugs gathered here to offer sacrifices, recite communal prayers, and hang weapons on the ancient trees, all of which were deemed strictly inviolable. Shapsug tradition warned that sacrilegious individuals and their kin would face divine retribution, catastrophic misfortune, or even total tribal annihilation if the grove were desecrated. These assemblies sought the deity's favor in military campaigns, expressed gratitude for victories, and petitioned for the recovery of the sick.

According to the historian Semyon Dubrovin, the Circassians conducted these rites through animal sacrifices and libations without utilizing formal churches, specialized prayer houses, or constructed altars. Instead, these untouched sacred groves served as natural temples. The local population maintained an absolute belief in the miraculous and protective properties of these woodlands. The Dzhemplokh forest, situated between the Belaya and Pshekha rivers—a region inhabited by the Abadzekhs and Mamkheghs—was dedicated exclusively to the deity of abundance, where a white heifer was sacrificed annually. In 1841, when Russian General Grigory Zass launched a military raid into this territory, his forces engaged in a heated battle within the Dzhemplokh forest, during which Zass was wounded. The Circassians widely interpreted this injury as a direct divine punishment against the general for daring to violate their sacred grove.

Dubrovin also detailed the precise structural layout and ritual procedure of these prayer sites. A rustic altar, marked by a roughly fashioned wooden cross, was typically erected beneath the canopy of a prominent oak tree. Specific family lineages congered at these sites to invoke the supreme deity, Thashkho. Each valley contained multiple sacred groves, with a designated cluster of families assigned to each, effectively forming a localized grove parish, or *tgakhap*. A respected elder was elected to serve as a lifelong priest (*shkhuako*). During religious festivals, the priest secured the cross against the trunk, surrounded and illuminated it with candles, and performed ritual purifications. Donning a traditional burka and removing his hat, he knelt to recite specific prayers tailored to the occasion—usually petitioning for a bountiful harvest, timely rain, or deliverance from epidemics. Following the invocation, the priest took a candle from the cross, rubbed wax onto the forehead of the sacrificial animal (a goat, ram, or bull), poured a libation of *buza* (a traditional fermented grain beverage) over its head, and performed the slaughter. The priest then raised a cup of *buza* and a ritual flatbread toward the heavens in prayer before presenting them to the eldest assembly member, who passed them through the crowd. The congregation then encircled the sacred tree three times. The animal's head was mounted on a ritual pole, the hide was gifted to the priest, and the meat was prepared for a communal feast. While the food cooked, elders joined hands to perform traditional ritual dances to ancient melodies, later joined by the youth. Once prepared, the senior men dined together while the younger men served them, and the women and girls feasted collectively at a respectful distance.

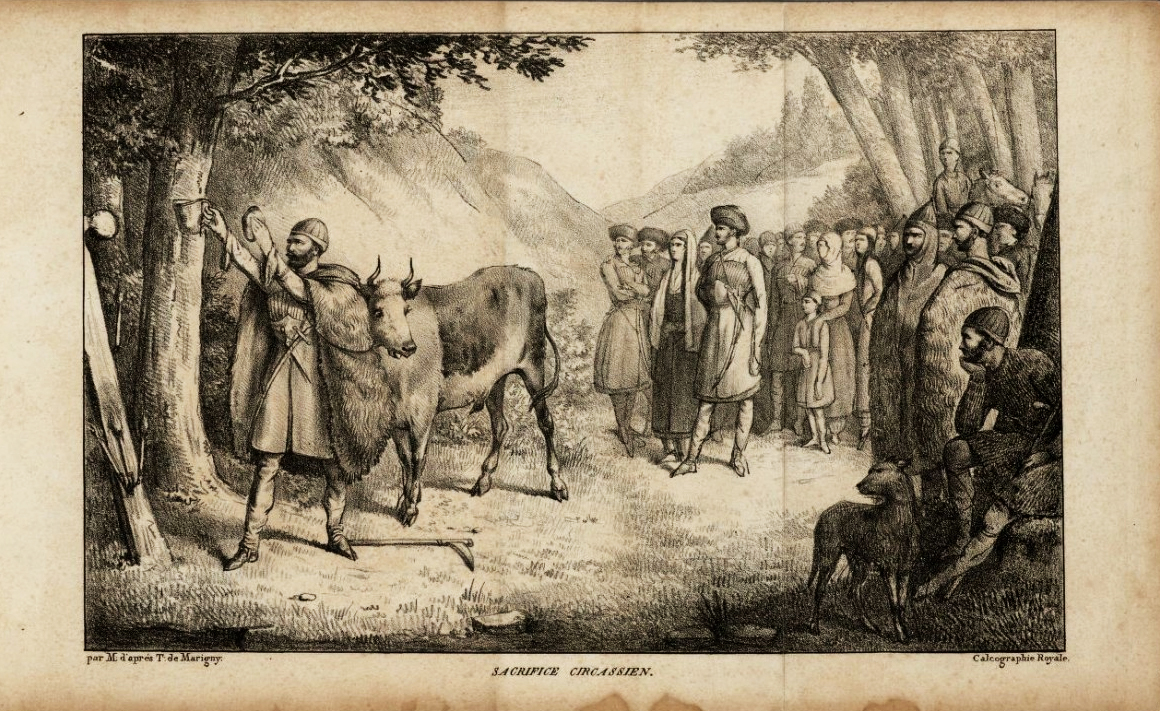
Circassian sacrifice. Engraving based on a drawing by Edouard Taitbout de Marigny

The Abadzekh community preserved distinct memories of these pre-Islamic practices centered around their traditional patron deity, Akhyn. Sacrifices were performed at revered oak trees, where a sacred cow was slaughtered following an invocation by the elders, after which the meat was distributed among the community. In 1902, an ethnographer recorded a local account of an elderly man who informed his adult sons, "You may practice your religion (Islam), but I will pray according to the customs of our ancestors." The elder then retreated into the forest to an isolated oak tree, surrounded by accumulated white sacrificial bones, where he engaged in prolonged prayer.

Vestiges of tree and grove veneration have survived among the Circassians into modern times. In the summer of 1929, Professor B. Sokolov documented active traditions within the Shapsug coastal villages near Krasno-Aleksandrovsky (Legotkh). His research confirmed that despite a general institutional decline, these ancient rituals remained localized. The village maintained sacred oaks known as *thakhoch* ("under God"). During a contemporary anti-religious campaign, local Komsomol activists severed the root system of one prominent sacred oak, causing the ancient tree to wither.

==== Lightning worship (Shible) ====
The cult of Shible, the Circassian deity associated with lightning and thunder, survived among several Circassian groups well into the modern period. Sacred trees struck by lightning were regarded as holy places and often became sites of veneration, sacrifice, and prayer. In many cases, a revered grove originated from a tree that had been struck by lightning.

Individuals killed by lightning were considered blessed or specially chosen. Elaborate rituals were performed in their honor, while livestock killed by lightning were commemorated through ceremonies comparable to those recorded among the Abkhazians.

The ethnographer L. Lulier, who witnessed such a ceremony among the Western Circassians in 1862, described a ritual conducted over three goats struck by lightning:

"A circle formed around the goats, and the usual dance began, accompanied by a chant in which the words 'Shible and Yaliy (Ilya)' were frequently repeated. Meanwhile, several men went into the forest, cut poles and stakes, and constructed a fairly high platform on four posts. They laid the goats on it and covered them with leaves. The platform is made high to protect the goats' carcasses from predatory animals. While some were constructing the platform, others had managed to go to the village and bring back various provisions, including several live goats. These were immediately sacrificed, with a libation ceremony, and their heads were placed on tall poles driven into the ground near the platform. This entire procedure is called shiblasha. No one touches the platform, the stakes, or the goats, and everything is left until it completely collapses and decomposes. While the food was being prepared and the pasta (a thick millet porridge) that serves as a substitute for bread was boiling, the young people of both sexes danced enthusiastically; gaiety and spirit were universal. When everything was ready, we were fed and only then sent on our way."

Celebrations connected with animals killed by lightning lasted three days, while ceremonies for people struck by lightning continued for seven days.

Important evidence for the persistence of the cult was recorded among the Shapsugs of the Black Sea coast in 1929 by Professor B. Sokolov. During periods of drought, members of the community would visit the grave of a person who had been killed by lightning. Trees growing around such graves were regarded as sacred. Participants joined hands and danced barefoot around the grave while chanting "o ele". The ceremony was repeated several times until the participants began to sweat. A relative of the deceased then raised a loaf of bread and appealed to the dead person to intercede on behalf of the community and bring rain.

Afterwards, a stone was taken from the grave and carried to a river. The stone was tied to a tree and submerged in the water. Participants then entered the river fully clothed. According to local belief, these actions would bring rain. The stone was carefully secured to prevent it from being carried away by the current, as excessive rainfall could lead to flooding. A guard remained at the site, and after three days the stone was removed and returned to the grave in a ceremonial procession. This ritual combined elements of ancestor veneration, sacred-tree worship, and the cult of Shible.

Although the lightning cult largely disappeared among the Kabardians, memories of it survived in oral tradition. Elderly informants recalled that special songs were sung during thunderstorms, including the phrase "Ele-ele, eleri shopa", whose meaning had already been forgotten. One Kabardian folktale recounts how the hero Khimysh leapt from a table with such force that people outside believed lightning had struck the house and began chanting ritual invocations associated with the lightning deity.

Among the so-called Mozdok Circassians, descendants of Kabardians who settled near Mozdok during the reign of Catherine the Great, traces of the cult also survived. When lightning struck a particular place, milk or milk soup with noodles was poured onto the site, flatbreads were prepared, food was distributed among those present, money was given away, and ritual dances accompanied by songs such as "Elely Shopa" were performed. In some instances, milk was also poured into wells as part of the ceremony.

==== Rainmaking ====
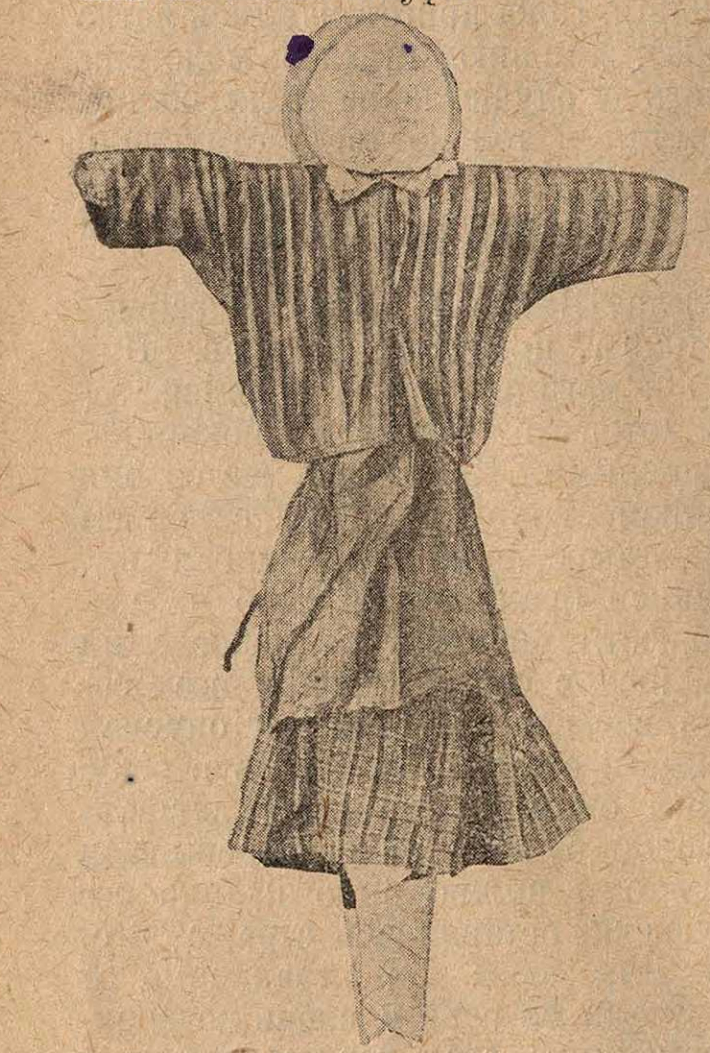
Khatseguashe” — “a doll made from a shovel; used by the Shapsugs in a rain-calling ritual during drought

Several traditional rainmaking rituals were recorded among the Circassians. In addition to the ceremony involving a stone taken from the grave of a person struck by lightning, the Black Sea Shapsugs practiced rituals involving the bathing of a Hatsəguashə and the dragging of an animal skin along the ground to invoke rain during severe droughts.

The Hatsəguashə was a ritual doll made from a wooden shovel dressed in women's clothing. During periods of drought, women and girls carried the doll to a river and threw it into the water. Along the route, people from each household attempted to splash both the doll and its bearers with water. Participants often entered homes, seized those they encountered, and dragged them to the river before throwing them into the water. After the ritual concluded, the doll was stripped of its clothing, dismantled, and discarded. Similar practices were formerly recorded among the Kabardians.

Despite opposition from local mullahs, who condemned the custom as contrary to Islam, the ritual continued to be performed into the twentieth century. In August 1929, women of the Shapsug village of Krasno-Aleksandrovsky revived the ceremony in an attempt to end a drought.

Another rainmaking ritual involved dragging an animal skin across the ground. Unlike the Hatsəguashə ceremony, this practice enjoyed the support of local Islamic clergy. A mullah typically led the procession, followed by two men dragging the skin. Every hundred paces the procession halted while prayers were recited. Similar customs were also recorded among the Kabardians of Greater Kabarda.

==== Worship of iron (Tlepsh) ====
Tlepsh was the patron deity of blacksmiths and the divine guardian of iron, weapons, and metalworking. His cult closely resembled that of Shasha among the Abkhazians.

According to tradition, Tlepsh himself was a master blacksmith capable of forging swords strong enough to cut iron. His grave, reportedly covered with iron filings, was shown in the Guchishche-Govashkh forest. Oaths were sworn in his name, and on feast days worshippers offered prayers and libations over axes, ploughshares, and other iron tools. Ritual observances were followed by communal feasting and marksmanship competitions.

Tlepsh was particularly invoked as a healer of wounds and broken bones. According to descriptions recorded by N. Dubrovin, an injured person was placed in a specially prepared room where iron objects such as ploughshares and hammers were positioned beside the bed. Visitors entering the room were expected to strike the iron three times with a hammer and lightly sprinkle the patient with water while wishing for recovery. Those who had committed crimes often avoided participating in these rituals.

The treatment of the wounded was accompanied by large nightly gatherings attended by relatives, neighbours, and visitors from surrounding villages. The primary objective was to keep the patient awake. Various games, dances, and entertainments were organised, including the popular "hand-slapping" game. The gatherings also served an important social function, strengthening communal bonds and demonstrating collective support for the injured person.

Ethnographic accounts from the Adyghe Autonomous Region recorded similar practices during the twentieth century. During the summer months, the patient's bed was moved into the courtyard, where men and women gathered in separate groups according to traditional etiquette. Violations of social rules were punished through mock trials and humorous penalties. Musical performances, circle dances, and competitive games formed an important part of the proceedings.

Professor B. Sokolov documented comparable gatherings among the Shapsugs, where participants sometimes wore comic masks fashioned from sheepskin and pumpkins. Several examples of these masks were later deposited in ethnographic museum collections.

Among the Kabardians, visitors attending such gatherings were known as shapshako ("those who come to visit"). An iron implement called a vabze was placed at the threshold of the patient's room and remained there until recovery. The festivities included dances, games, storytelling, humorous performances, and masked disguises. Young men frequently competed in displays of wit, jokes, and playful social interaction.

Kabardians also preserved the custom of marking with an iron object the place where an accident had occurred, such as a fall from a horse or a serious injury. In some regions, visitors entering a chapsh gathering would greet the patient by saying: "You are Tlepsh's guest." These practices illustrate the enduring symbolic association between iron, healing, protection, and the divine patronage of Tlepsh.

=== Zoroastrianism ===
Circassians never adopted Zoroastrianism (Adyghe: Мэджусыгъэ, Зертушыгъэ) in large numbers. However, the religion had impact in the region. It was the state religion of the powerful Iranian empires who for a long time bordered Circassian territories. Certain aspects of Circassian paganism may have been derived from Zoroastrianism. Out of all the organised "revealed creedal religions", Zoroastrianism is the oldest to be practiced in the Caucasus (North and South). The religion existed continuously for thousands of years before a very gradual transition to Christianity around the fourth century AD and Islam in the later centuries. Zoroastrianism began to spread into the Northern Caucasus alongside Christianity around the 5th century. The introduction of the religion was heavily driven by the political and military ambitions of the Sassanid Empire. During the Khazar Empire, a small group of Zoroastrians coexisted peacefully with Christians and Jews in the Northern Caucasus. Even after the region fell under Islamic control, many local rulers continued to bear Iranian names that were originally considered sacred by Zoroastrians. 19th-century British traveler James Bell who visited Circassia hypothesized that the original religion of the Circassians may have been a form of fire worship, suggesting an etymological link between the Circassian word for God (Tha) and the term Tau, which was used as a term for "God" by a group of Zoroastrians in the Caucasus.

Some connections between Zoroastrianism and the Circassians appear in the form of linguistic and cultural parallels. These linguistic parallels involve Ahura Mazda, the supreme god in Zoroastrianism. Ahura Mazda, is linked to the Circassian term "Akhumashe". The name of the prophet who founded the religion, Zarathushtra, parallels the Circassian name Zarakush. The Amesha Spentas, which are celestial saints or angels in Zoroastrianism, are possibly connected to the Circassian names Amshoqo and Yemish. Although debated, these connections may suggest that at some points, some Circassians may have adapted a syncretic form of Zoroastrianism, possibly to foster relations with the Iranian empires. In the Nart sagas, the mythology of the Circassians, a character named Nesren-zhache or Asran-zhache brought fire to the Narts and was chained to a rock. The name Asran is compared to the Avestan word aθravan, meaning "keeper of fire", which was a title for Zoroastrian priests. The Adyghe word for sin, gonakh, resembles the Persian word gonāh found in Zoroastrian texts; it is uncertain if this is due to Islamic influence or Zoroastrian. Researchers propose that the long stability of the Zoroastrian religion in the region, followed by a very slow transition to other faiths, is connected to the preservation of grammatical archaisms in Caucasian languages.

In the tenth century, the Arab historian Al-Masudi recorded that a group of Circassians followed the religion of the magi or majusiyya. Scholars debate whether this description referred to actual Zoroastrianism or local pagan practices involving fire (which may or may not have been influenced by Zoroastrianism). Samir Khotko argues that Al-Masudi used this term because the Circassians practiced aerial burials. In this custom, corpses were suspended in trees until the bones were collected for terrestrial burial. Khotko compares this to the Zoroastrian practice of placing bodies in dakhmas or on open rocks. Both traditions aimed to prevent dead flesh from defiling the earth. Similar aerial burials continued to be documented among Circassians and Abkhazians into the nineteenth century, specifically for noble individuals or those killed by lightning. Another funeral ritual called Karazh involved laying the corpse on a four-legged platform or tower, which is also identified as a Zoroastrian influence. In Circassia, elements of Zoroastrianism appear to have affected local customs relating to fire. Ancient Circassians venerated fire, a custom that historians attribute either to the practical difficulties of mastering fire or to direct Zoroastrian influence. Circassians maintained an established tradition of keeping a continuous fire in their family hearths, never allowing them to grow cold. A common greeting among the people was "May your fire be blessed!". If a fire went out, it was considered an omen of impending doom for the individual.

Authors state that Muslim historians applied the term majus to groups who utilized fire in burial rites, including cremation. V.F. Minorsky suggested the term described groups that burned their dead, though he was uncertain if Circassians practiced cremation. Archaeological excavations reveal that cremation burials were present in the North-Western Caucasus during the Khazar period. Some Adyghe curses involve phrases about burning or roasting, which might originate from these cremation rituals. It is unknown if the inhabitants of the North-Western Caucasus built Zoroastrian fire temples. R.R. Rudnitsky proposed that Zoroastrianism spread in Western Alania, right next to Circassia, between the seventh and ninth centuries through Sogdian merchants or Persian refugees, but he found no evidence of it reaching Circassia in any meaningful way.

In some Ottoman sources, some goups of Circassians are recorded as adhering to a variant of Zoroastrianism. The Ottoman chronicler Ahmed Lutfi described these groups as belonging to a Zoroastrian creed known as "Şāsı". An 1826 imperial document similarly referred to their practices as a "Zoroastrian custom". Modern scholars, however, argue that "Zoroastrian" in this context likely is a generic term for all pagans and not the Iranian religion.

=== Judaism ===
Jews are among the ancient populations of the Caucasus, with a historical presence spanning 2,500 years. Characterized by distinct historical, geopolitical, religious, cultural, and psychological traits, Caucasian Jews represent an intermediate link between Western and Eastern Jewish communities. The renowned Israeli historian I. David identified several key defining features of Caucasian Jewry:

- Caucasian Jews are neither Sephardic nor Ashkenazi; rather, they form a distinct ethnic group that emerged from the unique Iberian-Caucasian geopolitical and polyethnolinguistic environment.
- Broadly speaking, "Jews of the Caucasus" encompasses all Jews born in or who migrated to and settled in the region, regardless of their origin (though one might contest I. David's thesis here, as the term primarily denotes the Mountain Jewish population who have inhabited the Caucasus for millennia).
- For Caucasian Jews, religion is not merely an abstract socio-ideological phenomenon or "religion for religion's sake"; instead, it serves as a vital expression of a centuries-old paternal tradition deeply embedded in the collective consciousness.
- Although the religious rituals of Caucasian Jews share some similarities with Sephardic traditions, they constitute an independently developed practice unique to the Caucasian Jewish communities.
- The philosophy of history of Caucasian Jewry reflects the centuries-old evolution of this community—the vital existential factor that shaped its development and identity.

The earliest Jewish settlers arrived in the Caucasus during the 4th–5th centuries BCE. A persistent legend among Mountain Jews traces their ancestry back to migrations following the destruction of the First Temple, linking their descent to the "Ten Lost Tribes of Israel." The mass arrival of Jews in the North Caucasus occurred around the 1st century BCE, primarily settling within Greek colonies located in the territory of the Meotians—the ancient ancestors of the Circassians. A significant portion of this population settled on the Taman Peninsula, which served as a vital trade and economic hub in the Black Sea region.

During the 8th century, following the settlement of approximately 20,000 Jews in Circassia and the establishment of diplomatic ties with the Khazar Khaganate, a small number of Circassians embraced Judaism. While several aristocrats adopted the faith, historical records note only 59 Circassian commoners who converted to Judaism. Over time, Judaism was gradually superseded by Christianity across Circassia.

The majority of Circassian Jews traditionally resided on the Taman Peninsula. Circassian princes, whose martial and noble mentality alienated them from commerce, willingly granted trading priorities to Jewish and foreign merchants, offering them imperial patronage and protection.

The first historical figure of Jewish descent documented in Kabardia was Qudenet, who lived in the early 15th century. He was a close associate of Kabard Tambiy, a prominent Circassian political figure credited with consolidating the name Kabardia for eastern Circassian lands. The Qudenet family coat of arms retains a striking resemblance to the Star of David. By marrying Kabard Tambiy's daughter, Qudenet attained the highest noble rank in Circassia, tlekotlesh. In the Kabardian feudal hierarchy, the Qudenets ranked third, trailing only the princes of Tambiy.

The Italian geographer and ethnographer Giorgio Interiano provides valuable insights into the influential role Jews played in the administrative and cultural life of the Circassians. According to his accounts, Jews were actively involved in drafting administrative and diplomatic documents concerning the economic and political affairs of Circassia. At the end of the 15th century, Zacharias de Ghisolfi (referred to in Russian sources as Zacharias Gurguruis) emerged as a prominent political figure, major merchant, and ruler of the Genoese trading post of Matrega in Crimea. The son of noble Genoese Jew Simone de Ghisolfi and Bika-khanum—the daughter of Circassian Prince Bezok—Zacharias maintained active correspondence with Ivan III of Moscow, where he was formally addressed in documents as a "Zhidovin" or "Jew."

In 1483 and 1487, Zacharias utilized merchants traveling through Kaffa and his own diplomatic agents to send letters to Ivan III in Moscow, proposing to enter Russian service. In response, he received an official invitation from the Tsar to relocate to the capital. However, Zacharias apparently had no intention of moving to Moscow; his primary ambition was to solidify his rule in Taman with the political backing of Ivan III. As the historian L.I. Lavrov observed:

The far-sighted Ivan III, who willingly accepted foreign princes into his service, was interested in Zakhariy as an active and educated man with connections in Western Europe, Crimea and the North-West Caucasus (Circassia) and a good knowledge of Crimean-Turkish-Circassian affairs

In March 1485, Ivan III commanded Shein, the Russian ambassador to Crimea, to facilitate Zacharias's transition to Russian service by any means necessary. He instructed the ambassador to request that Mengli Giray send "two of his men to Cherkassy to that Zachariah, who knows the route from Cherkassy to Moscow, and to order his men there to bring that Zachariah, the Taman prince, from Cherkassy to me." By September 1489, Ivan III dispatched ambassador Nikifor Domanov to Zacharias with an explicit message detailing the time and location where the Grand Duke's escort would await him. However, in May 1491, word arrived from Crimea that Domanov could not fulfill the Tsar's orders because Zacharias was delayed by volatile geopolitical conflicts in the Black Sea region. Domanov attributed this largely to a growing dispute between Zacharias and the Ottoman Sultan. It is highly probable that through Zacharias, the Circassian princes—who had recently endured an Ottoman invasion—were attempting to forge a strategic alliance with Moscow against the Ottoman Empire. This explains Zacharias's hesitation to relocate permanently to Moscow, his strategic requests for external assistance, and his defiant stance against the Sultan. As an educated diplomat and highly influential figure, Zacharias was well-equipped to leverage his relationship with the Circassian princes for broader geopolitical aims. The surviving correspondence between Ivan III and Zacharias de Ghisolfi remains a vital record of early Russo-Circassian relations. By the early 16th century, Zacharias entered the formal service of Mengli Giray. Before 1505, Zacharias was recorded among the Crimean princes receiving Lithuanian diplomatic gifts (pominki), confirming his elevated status at the court of Mengli Giray. Concurrently with Zacharias's alignment with the Khan, Crimean-Circassian relations stabilized into a temporary alliance.

The detailed description of the Jewish community of Circassia provided by the Ottoman traveler Evliya Celebi remains of great historical interest:

"...They live at the foot of the Abkhazian Mountains, among inaccessible cliffs and dense forests. They are a people of crafts, not warlike. There are at least ten thousand of them, and they have no leaders or rulers. Only in each camp there are one or two people as governors, worthy and distinguished (called) "takaku", that is, priests... They do not trade with any people, nor do they mix with any other tribe. They do not take girls from there and (themselves) do not give them. They do not share meals with people of other people... They also do not eat chickens or pigs. They also do not eat those products and provisions that they take from someone.

They show exceptional attention to guests and steal nothing from them. They don't shed blood and don't go to war. They don't eat honey or cheese when they have beans, peas, and millet porridge to eat. They don't eat the meat of animals slaughtered with knives. Only when there is no other food do they slaughter and eat fat animals.

"They have many sheep, lambs, and cows, but no pigs. These people drink mead, but do not drink buza... They showed the khan boundless respect, but did not send an escort, for they are not warriors... Two hours' journey on the banks of the Giaga River is the Mamshukh camp, a fortress-like settlement: around it is the well-appointed, impregnable village of Azbare. From here, three hours' journey is the Ul River, then, another two hours, the Serali River, and then the Uarp River. These three rivers begin in the Chakal Mountains in the land of the Abkhazians, flow east, and empty into the great Kuban River. In these places, the land of Mamshukh ends"

Several key arguments support the historical link between the Mamkhegh (Mamshukh) and the oldest Jewish communities in the Caucasus. Unlike the highly martial Circassians, the Mamshukh were non-warlike and specialized in artisanal crafts—a traditional socioeconomic role of Caucasian Jews for millennia. Additionally, the Mamshukh functioned as a closed, endogamous community; its members did not intermarry with neighboring tribes, mirroring the preservation practices of other isolated Jewish groups. They maintained absolute autonomy, living peacefully and unmolested deep within Circassian territories. Dietary practices further align them with Jewish law, notably their strict avoidance of pork. While Evliya Celebi claimed they abstained from chicken, this likely stemmed from a misunderstanding: poultry was permitted in Judaism, but could only be slaughtered by designated ritual slaughterers within the community, known as the takaku. The Mamkheghs lacked rabbinical texts, a detail that aligns perfectly with I. David's observation that the core of Caucasian Jewry consolidated prior to the final editing of the Talmud, characterizing them as a pre-Talmudic Jewish community. Locally, these community members were referred to as chufud (Jews). Consequently, assertions by certain historians who classify the Mamkheghs strictly as ethnic Circassians appear erroneous. For instance, N.G. Volkova hypothesized that the takaku were merely a Circassian social caste tied to localized pagan cults—a class entirely unrecorded elsewhere in Circassian history. Nevertheless, prolonged regional cohabitation undoubtedly led to the cultural and linguistic assimilation of some Jewish populations. Following the integration of the Imperial Russian administration into the North Caucasus, several hundred Circassian-speaking Jews—descendants of the assimilated Mamkhegh populations of the Western Caucasus—officially took up Russian citizenship.

The Soviet era initiated a new chapter in Circassian–Jewish relations. In 1925, a Mountain Jewish edition of the regional newspaper Karakhalk launched in Nalchik, published in the Judeo-Tat language using Hebrew square script under the editorship of Khanoy Ifraimov. Speaking at the third plenum of the Central Executive Committee of the KBAO on July 26, 1925, the leader of Kabardino-Balkaria, B.E. Kalmykov, advocated for granting administrative autonomy to the Mountain Jewish settlement near Nalchik. This motion passed that same year, and Aron Leviev was appointed the first chairman of the executive committee of the Mountain Jewish Autonomy. The autonomous zone lasted until 1938, when it was dissolved and the settlement was fully integrated into the administrative municipality of Nalchik.

Circassian–Jewish solidarity was severely tested yet firmly preserved during the brutal years of the Great Patriotic War. Nazi forces systematically targeted the Jewish populations of the North Caucasus, replicating the atrocities committed across other occupied European territories. In September, Nazi Einsatzgruppen executed 470 Mountain Jews—primarily women, children, and the elderly—in the village of Bogdanovka in the Mozdok district of North Ossetia, alongside 6,000 Jews slaughtered across the Kavminvody region. While local collaborators in these districts occasionally assisted in these punitive actions, a starkly different dynamic unfolded as Nazi forces captured Nalchik in late October 1942. Though a brutal occupation regime was instantly implemented, the majority of Nalchik's 3,000-strong Mountain Jewish population managed to flee ahead of the German advance. For those who remained, local Kabardian families stepped in at immense personal risk, sheltering Jewish neighbors, providing them with false identities, and claiming them as indigenous relatives. Today, the Yad Vashem Holocaust Memorial Museum in Jerusalem preserves extensive firsthand accounts from survivors of the Nalchik community, honoring the exceptional courage and nobility of the Kabardians who saved their Jewish neighbors from systematic extermination.

The Circassians have peacefully coexisted with the historic Jewish community of Nalchik for generations. During the 1990s, economic shifts and regional instability caused the Jewish population in Circassia to contract sharply due to widespread immigration to Israel. Today, a small but vibrant and growing Jewish community continues to establish roots in Sochi.

=== Christianity ===
==== Orthodoxy ====
The ancestral religious landscape of the Circassians also retains distinct historical layers of Christianity, encompassing both the Eastern Orthodoxy propagated by the Byzantine Empire and the Catholicism introduced by Genoese merchants. This syncretic heritage is evidenced by traditional hymns honoring the Virgin Mary, the etymology of calendar days, localized religious terminology, the widespread veneration of the cross, the recurrence of stone crosses on late medieval graves, and the remnants of historic Christian chapels. Archaeological excavations corroborate this influence through the discovery of pectoral crosses and religious icons within local burials. However, these Christian traditions were deeply intertwined with older indigenous practices, as graves consistently yield complex funerary goods strictly forbidden by standard Christian dogma. Consequently, the Circassians adopted Christianity in a largely formal and superficial manner, maintaining their traditional customary laws as their primary ethical framework. This localized fusion of Christian and polytheistic thought persisted among the Adyghe populations until the early 17th century. Following the retreat of Greek and Italian geopolitical influence from the northwestern Caucasus, the institutional foundations of the Christian faith eroded. Lacking external ecclesiastical support, it dissolved into a complex conglomerate of polytheistic and Christian concepts, folk rituals, and traditional superstitions. Notable practices included scapulimancy—utilizing a ram's shoulder blade to divine future harvests, weather patterns, military conflicts, natural disasters, and seasonal prosperity—alongside divination using beans performed by women, and a deep-seated belief in shape-shifting witches known as the uddi.

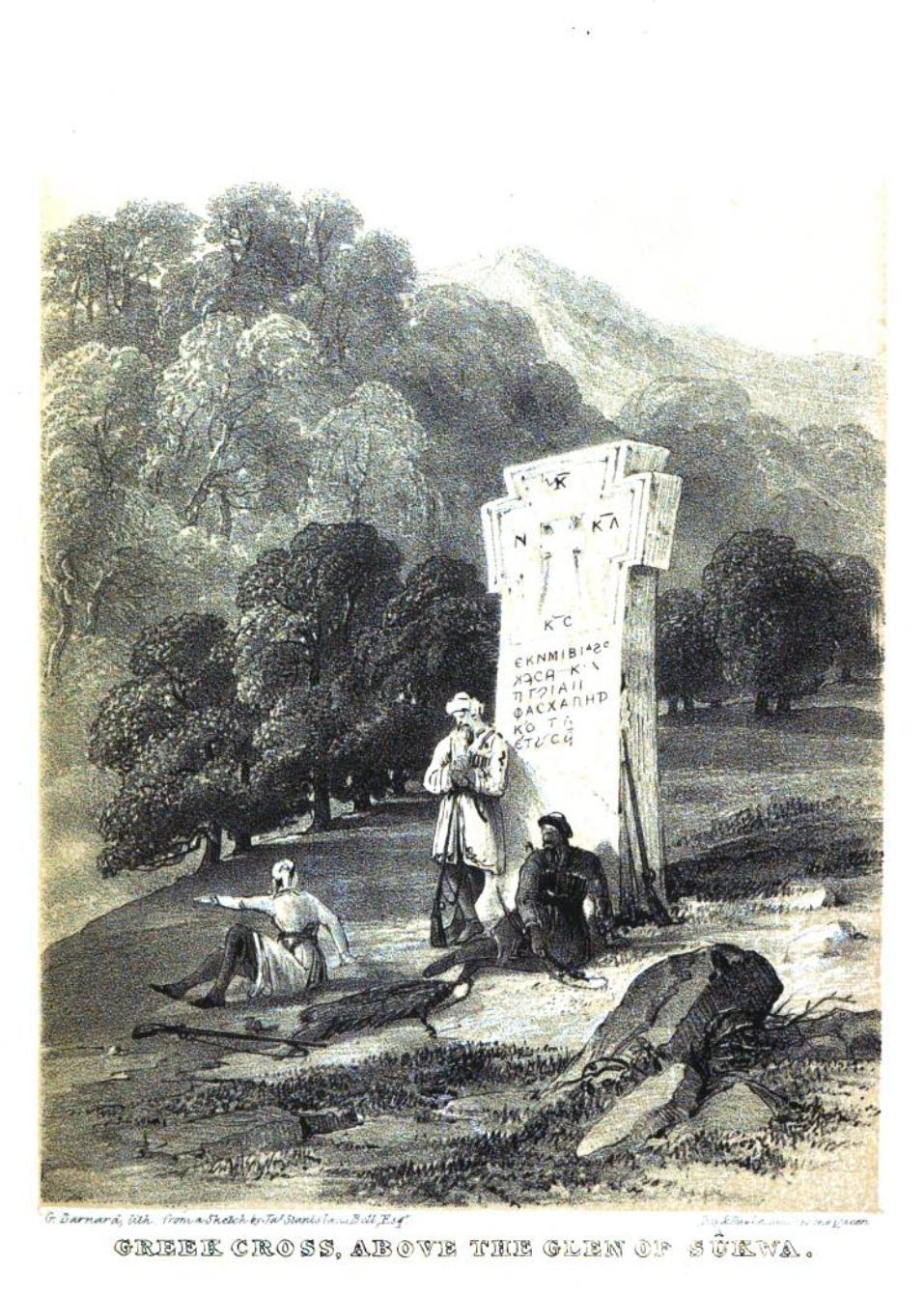
A Greek cross in Circassia, 1830s

It is a traditional account of the early church that Christianity made its first appearance in Circassia during the 1st century AD through the apostolic travels and preaching of Saint Andrew. The earliest written narratives tracking Andrew's missionary work in the region date to the early 3rd century, including a notable account by Saint Hippolytus, Bishop of Portusenus. Church tradition holds that Andrew, accompanied by Simon the Zealot, first crossed into Circassian territory from Sevastopol in Abkhazia (modern-day Sukhumi). While Andrew left Simon behind to continue his mission in Abkhazia, he personally advanced into Zichia; according to these records, the local Zikhs initially intended to put Andrew to death, but upon witnessing his absolute poverty, meekness, and strict asceticism, they abandoned their plans. Andrew subsequently departed the region for the Crimean Peninsula. Simon the Zealot sustained his apostolic labor within Abkhazia until he was martyred by the Zikhs and interred at the diocesan center of Nicopsis, an area believed to correspond with the modern village of Novomikhailovskaya, around 55 AD.

More concrete historical markers establishing the broader spread of Christianity across the Northwest Caucasus, the Taman Peninsula, and Crimea appear by the early 4th century. An early Christian tombstone dated to 304 was excavated in Kerch, and records show that Cadmus, the Bosporan Bishop, personally attended the First Council of Nicaea in 324. Early medieval traditions assert that Zichia, Abazgia, and the Alanian territories in the upper reaches of the Kuban River served as remote zones of exile for Roman Christians during the imperial persecutions at the turn of the 3rd and 4th centuries. These exiled communities became some of the earliest active Christian proselytizers in the North Caucasus, working alongside missionary networks dispatched from Transcaucasia.

Despite early traditions, verified historical records indicate that Christianity systematically took root throughout Circassia between the 3rd and 5th centuries AD primarily through Greek and Byzantine political and cultural influence. The Byzantine Empire regularly deployed large cohorts of clergy to Circassian lands to solidify strategic alliances. Under the reign of Emperor Justinian I (527–565), Byzantine hegemony expanded drastically across Italy, North Africa, and Transcaucasia. The 19th-century Circassian historian Shora Nogmov recorded this regional memory:

"According to the legends of the highlanders, Justin or Yustuk [Justinian] was an ally of the Adyghe people and even called himself an Adyghe prince. He made efforts to convert the Adyghe to Christianity... A priest is called a shogen, a bishop — a shekhnik... The Christian faith flourished in the Caucasus Mountains, supported by the Greek clergy, who replaced the departed by sending new bishops and priests."

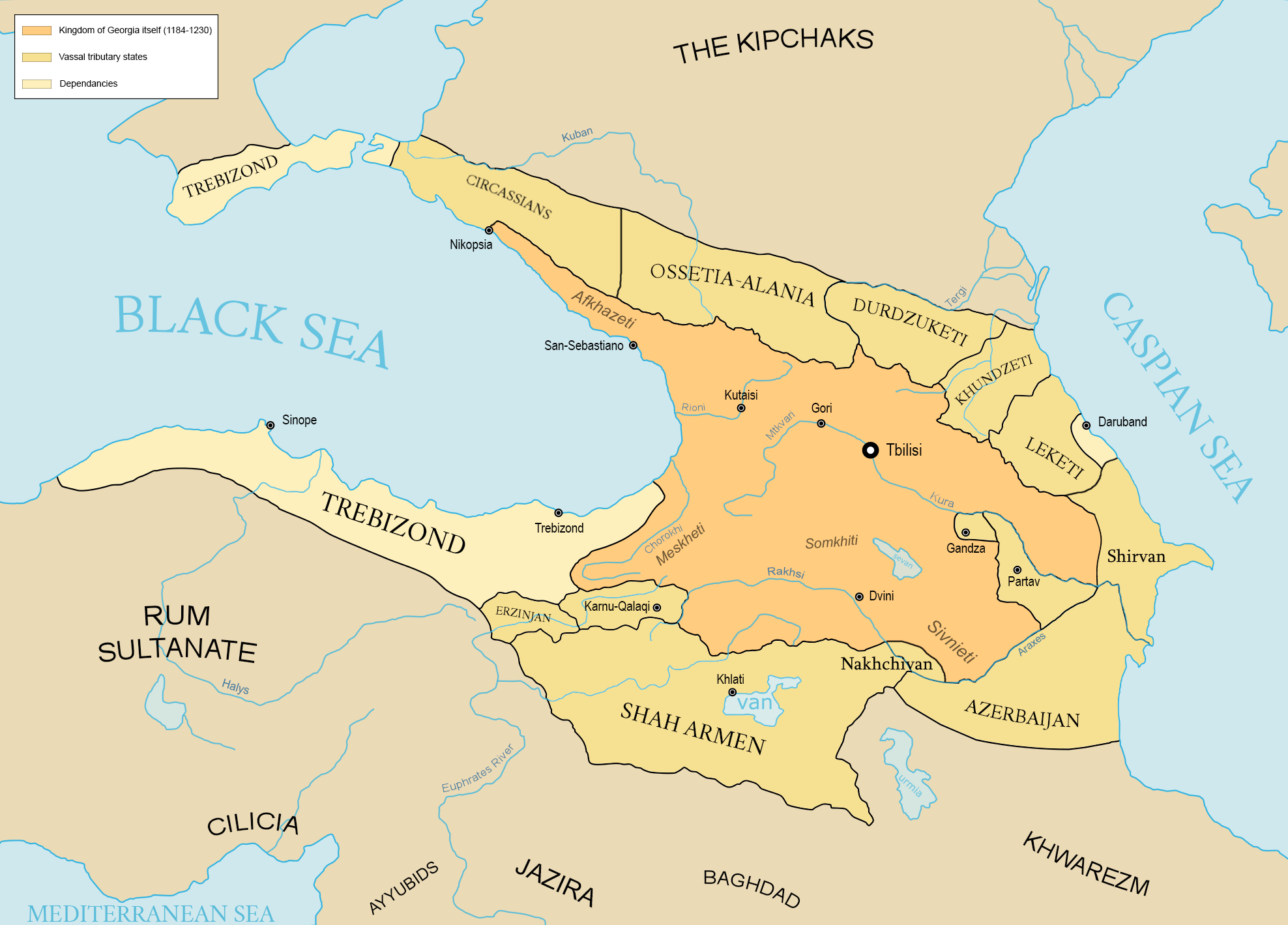
Nicopsia on a modern map of the Kingdom of Georgia early in the 13th century.

Historical analyses, such as those by E. S. Zevakin in Essays on the History of Adygea, conclude that medieval Zichia maintained four distinct ecclesiastical dioceses:

- Phanagoria
- Zikhopolis
- Matrah (located on the modern Taman Peninsula)
- Nicopsis (situated near modern-day Sukhumi)

In 858, Byzantine Emperor Michael III dispatched the renowned missionaries Cyril and Methodius to the Khazar Khaganate, which then exercised suzerainty over lands including Circassia. Throughout their journey, the brothers actively preached the Gospel, anchoring the Diocese of Circassia and the Central Caucasus and overseeing the construction of a fully functioning church and liturgical center in the city of Majar. However, the Khazar Khaganate's subsequent official adoption of Judaism stifled the formal, state-backed spread of Christianity further eastward. Around this period, the Ziyang Diocese is first documented in historical records, notable for maintaining its own Patriarchate and local priesthood. Operating under the ultimate jurisdiction of Constantinople, it functioned with a high degree of administrative autonomy and remained notably free from the theological disruptions of Byzantine Iconoclasm.

While a consensus of researchers traces the arrival of Christianity among the Adyghe directly to Byzantium, peripheral missionary lines also entered via Georgia and Kievan Rus'.

Between the 10th and late 11th centuries, the expanding dioceses of Tamartakha (Taman) and Zikhia merged into a unified see centered on Taman. This era coincided with the military campaigns of Grand Prince Svyatoslav the Brave against the Khazars. Following the collapse of the Khaganate, Svyatoslav marched back along the Kuban River and established the Tmutarakan Eastern Slavic principality on the Taman Peninsula, which consolidated further following Vladimir the Great's campaigns against Korsun (Chersonesos). This brought an ancient Russian principality directly into contact with Circassia for nearly a century. However, the Russian Orthodox Church did not absorb the local see, and the diocese did not report to Kyiv. Following the arrival of Nikon the Great in Tmutarakan, who oversaw the construction of the principality's primary stone church, the see became known simply as the Tmutarakan Diocese while remaining under the ecclesiastical authority of Constantinople. Nikon stood as the sole recorded Russian missionary active in the medieval North Caucasus. In the late 11th century, under Byzantine Emperor Alexios I Komnenos and Patriarch Eustratius, the regional administration was re-divided into separate Zikhian and Abazgian dioceses, placing the Ziyang center at Nicopsis and the Tamartakhian center at Tmutarakan.

According to medieval Georgian chronicles, the Sixth Ecumenical Council (680–691) theoretically incorporated the Adyghe territories into the jurisdiction of the Mtskheta (Georgian) Patriarchate. On this basis, historian N. T. Mikhailov suggested that before the formal 10th-century establishment of the Alanian bishopric, Circassia maintained a loose ecclesiastical dependence on Georgia. As the political and military fortunes of the Kingdom of Georgia ascended in the 12th century, Christian practice expanded substantially across Circassia. Numerous stone churches were constructed under Georgian architectural influence, particularly within southern Circassian communities, though the vast majority were ruined over the centuries. The faith integrated most deeply within the sedentary, coastal Circassian populations. During the early 13th century, western Circassia and Abkhazia were brought into the geopolitical orbit of Queen Tamar of Georgia, leading to partial re-Christianization efforts. This phase marked the absolute zenith of Georgian political and cultural hegemony across the Caucasus. Georgian historiography routinely referred to this western Circassian realm as *Djiketia* (derived from *Zichia*). While this era left architectural ruins and deep cultural exchanges that lingered long after direct Georgian political authority waned, the faith's deeper theological penetration remained limited.

The geopolitical landscape fractured severely following an invasion of Circassia by the Mongol commander Temnik-Nogai in 1277. The destruction shattered regular communication lines between the Abaza-Zikhian dioceses. In response to this isolation, the Zikhian and Matarkhian sees formally merged into a single, elevated metropolitan see. By 1318, this jurisdiction was formally recognized as the independent Metropolitanate of Zikhia and Matarkh. The last surviving historical mention of this Orthodox see occurs in 1396 during the administration of Metropolitan Joseph. While liturgical services were occasionally rendered in local languages—with eyewitnesses noting instruction given in the Yass and Zikh tongues—Christianity never fully displaced indigenous social structures, particularly within the interior highlands. Writing as early as the 9th century, the monk Epiphanius observed that the Zikhs "did not even half believe."

By the turn of the 16th century, the ethnographer and traveler Giorgio Interiano observed the highly fragmented, nominal state of the region's aristocratic Christianity:

"Noble Circassians do not attend church until old age, limiting themselves to a prayer at the entrance, because they live by plunder and consider attending church a sin. Toward the end of their lives, they abandon plundering and only then begin attending church. He also mentions that priests serve in Greek, sometimes not understanding the language."

During this period, Jesus was considered not a central figure of God, but rather an entity added to the pantheon of deities. The chief deity was still Thashkho. The most significant change Christianity brought to the Circassian belief system was the physical representation of God through icons (Adyghe: Тхьэнапэ). These icons included the Mother of God (Adyghe: Тхьэнанэ) and the Holy Spirit (Adyghe: Тхьэм ипсэ). The Circassians called Christianity "Chelehstan" (Чэлэхьстэн) or "Chiristan" (Чыристэн[ыгъэ]) Christmas "Khurome" (Хъуромэ), Easter "Utizh" (ӏутӏыжь), priests "Shodjen" (Adyghe: Шэуджэн, Kabardian: Щоджэн) and pastors "Shekhnik." Religious ceremonies and prayers were conducted in Greek. Furthermore, Elijah was held in high esteem, called "Yele" (Елэ), and associated with the lightning god Shible.

Johannes Schiltberger wrote:

...There were Christian communities of Greek faith in Circassian lands. These people prayed in accordance with Greek religious traditions, invoking God in Yass (Alan) and Zikh (Circassian) languages.

For the Circassians, the most influential and revered figure in Christianity was St. George (Adyghe: Аушыджэр). Zikhia (Circassia) held a significant place in the Orthodox world. The region housed four ancient bishoprics: Sinopoli, Phanagoria (Matrega), Nicopsis, and Tmutarakan. Towards the end of the 13th century, the Diocese of Zichia was elevated to metropolitan status. From 1318 onward, sources mention an independent Zichia metropolis known as "Zicho-Matarch." According to Priest Ricasdus, the Circassians considered themselves Orthodox Christians and used Greek as their written language. Giorgio Interiano, who visited the region in the 16th century, described the Circassian beliefs as follows:

They call themselves Christians, and there are Greek clergy among them. However, they only baptize their children when they reach the age of eight. As is their custom, the clergy only sprinkle holy water on these children and recite a short prayer.

A new phase of Orthodox Christian influence began in Circassia when the Besleney, Zhaney, Abazinia, and Kabardians dispatched diplomatic embassies to Moscow in 1552, 1557, and 1558.

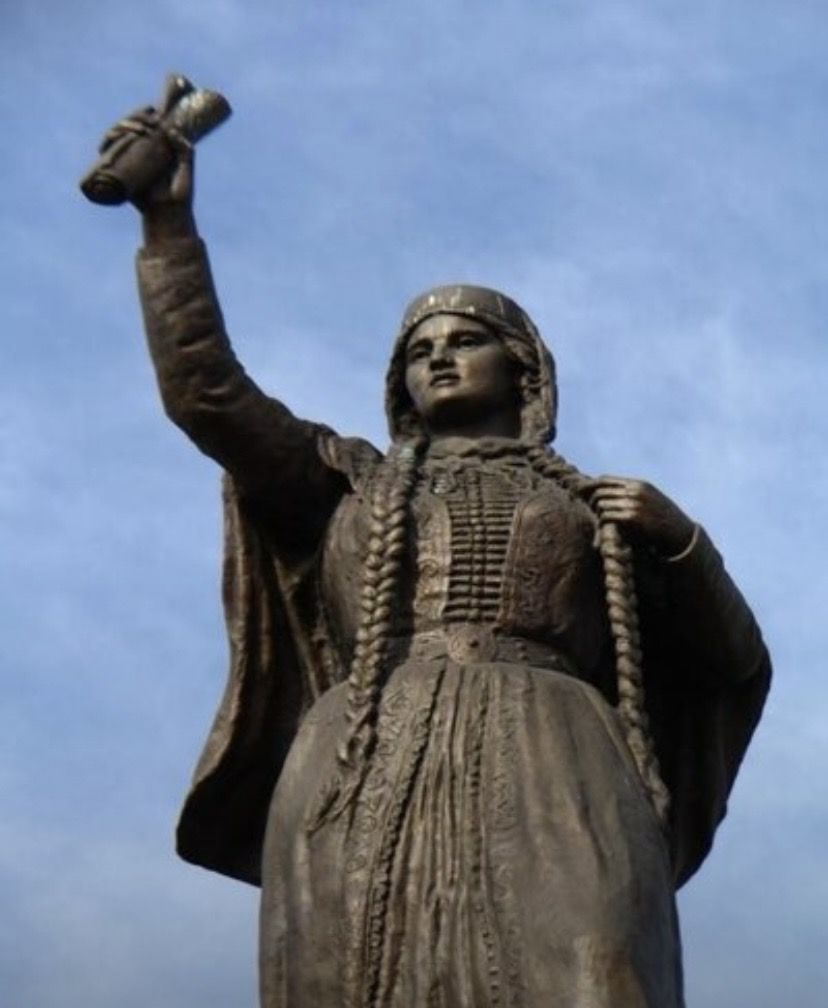
Statue of Maria Temryukovna

Russian–Kabardian ties were significantly strengthened in August 1561 following the marriage of Tsar Ivan IV to Maria Temryukovna, the daughter of the Kabardian Grand Prince Temruqo Idar. This dynastic marriage held profound geopolitical significance for both Kabardia and the Tsardom of Russia, serving as a foundational element in weakening the strategic position of the Crimean Khanate within the North Caucasus region.

The union between Maria Temryukovna and the Russian monarch prompted the conversion of several high-ranking Kabardian princes to Orthodoxy, an ideological shift that notably did not interrupt their close political and familial relations with their Muslim and polytheistic relatives. The baptism of these Kabardian, Circassian, Nogai, and other regional princes was celebrated with great solemnity in Moscow and other prominent Russian cities. As the 19th-century historian Nikolay Karamzin observed:

"The faith... implanted between the Black and Caspian Seas in the most ancient times of the Byzantine Empire has not yet completely died out in these lands; its dark traditions and some rituals remain... the princes baptized their children in Moscow, entrusting them to the Tsar for upbringing—some were baptized themselves."

Among the baptized was Saltankul, the younger son of the Grand Prince of Kabardia, Temruqo Idar. In 1558, Saltankul arrived in the Tsardom of Russia alongside his elder brother Ulgairuk, where, by the directive of their father, he accepted Orthodox baptism and was granted the status of a hereditary service prince. Tsar Ivan the Terrible personally oversaw his conversion, assigning him the Christian name Mikhail and ordering that he be formally educated in reading and writing.

This military and political alliance, formally concluded in 1557 on behalf of Supreme Prince Temruqo, initiated a period of sustained bilateral relations and gradual cultural rapprochement. Following the dynastic marriage of 1561, representatives of the Kabardian feudal aristocracy increasingly assumed vital intermediary roles in managing diplomacy between the Russian state and the diverse ethnic groups of the North Caucasus.

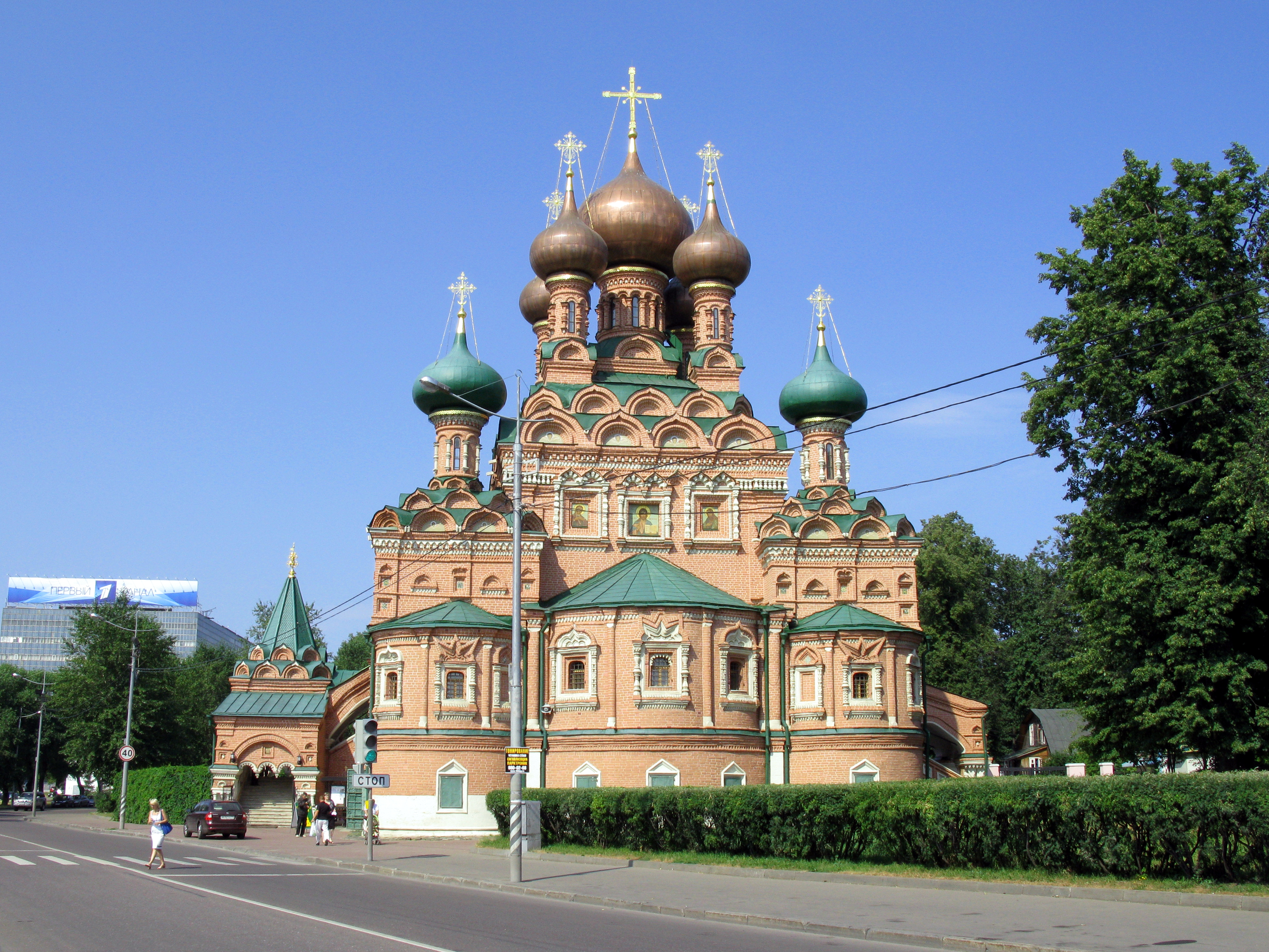
The patrimonial church in the Cherkassky estate in the village of Ostankino . Built in 1677-92 by Prince M. Ya. Cherkassky.

Among these noble houses, the Cherkassky princely family—consisting of the direct descendants and political allies of Temruqo—emerged as a dominant force in consolidating these ties. From the mid-16th century onward, members of this lineage integrated fully into the administrative, diplomatic, and military architecture of the Russian state, maintaining an influential presence that extended well into the imperial era.

Temruqo's descendants and their regional factions remained permanently aligned with Moscow, establishing the Cherkassky dynasty as an elite fixture within the Russian nobility. Despite the geographical distance and fluid loyalties of the broader Caucasus, Kabardian cavalry units tied to this alliance participated actively in Russia's major military campaigns. Beginning with the Livonian War, these elite North Caucasian contingents deployed alongside Russian forces in numerous conflicts in the decades following Temruqo's death, cementing a long-term military dimension to the regional alliance.

==== Catholicism ====
The first Catholic missionaries came to Caucasus in the 12th century. With the Sack of Constantinople, the spread of the Catholic faith in the region accelerated. During this period, Catholicism became particularly influential in the coastal regions of Circassia; the Circassian prince Ferzakht even became Catholic. The Pope sent him a letter of thanks in 1333 for his efforts.

By the mid-13th century, the Tmutarakan Principality collapsed entirely, and its territories reverted to Byzantine control alongside the shifting administration of the Church. Roman Catholic missionaries capitalized on this fluid landscape, entering Circassia in 1237; the Dominican friar Julian documented early accounts of local syncretic rituals. Following the Fourth Crusade and the sack of Constantinople, Catholic maritime powers aggressively penetrated the Taman region, and the growth of Genoese colonies fundamentally shifted the regional balance of power. Operating from their primary Crimean emporium at Kaffa, Genoese Franciscan and Dominican friars traveled regularly into Circassia. The Adyghe nobility welcomed the missionary Luka and permitted the establishment of permanent Catholic stations; many aristocrats embraced the faith primarily to cement political alliances and secure lucrative commercial monopolies. In 1346, the Franciscan friar John was consecrated as the first Catholic Bishop of Zichia, managing an extensive diocese spanning parts of Crimea and the Circassian coast. Taken as a slave to Genoa, John of Zichia converted to Catholicism there and joined the Franciscan Order, then returned to his homeland and engaged in missionary activities. In 1349 John of Zichia was appointed Archbishop of Matrega by Pope Clement VI. John of Zichia became one of the most prominent religious figures of the period.

Despite these high-level conversions, Catholicism failed to secure a popular footing. The absence of liturgical or educational translations in the Circassian language rendered Latin services entirely alien to the general populace, who merely adopted outward legal ceremonies without converting in substance. By the mid-14th century, a parallel Catholic diocese emerged at the Genoese colony of Matrega (modern Taman). Its bishop, consecrated in 1349 as John, was of native Circassian origin, having risen from slavery to purchase his freedom; tracking data for this diocese ceases after his death in 1376. From 1419 until 1482, Matrega was governed autonomously by the Genoese-Circassian Ghisolfi family. The ultimate collapse of Catholic missionary efforts is widely attributed to the high-handed, forceful methods sometimes deployed by Genoese authorities to impose religious conformity, which sparked recurring, violent backlashes among the native population.

As a result of the Catholic Church's missionary work, a Catholic Circassian community, referred to as Frenkkardashi "Frank Brother" in Italian sources, emerged. The Genoese also played an active role in spreading Catholicism among the Circassians. In 1320, Pope John XXII strengthened the Catholic presence in the region by opening a cathedral in the city of Caffa.

According to a Circassian legend, Circassian prince Inal the Blind gave his daughter to the Genoese leader in exchange for the Catholics leaving Circassia. By 1439, two Catholic bishops and one archbishop were recorded as serving on the Taman Peninsula of Circassia.

==== The decline of Christianity ====
Despite all these developments, Christianity never truly took root among the Circassian people. It merged with local pagan beliefs, transforming into a semi-pagan, semi-Christian faith. The Virgin Mary was considered both the Mother of God and the Goddess of Bees, while Jesus was identified with Thashkho, the Circassian chief deity.

Following the Mongol invasions and Timur's campaigns, connections with the main churches in Circassia were severed, and bishoprics gradually disappeared. With the outbreak of the Russo-Circassian War, Christianity began to be perceived by the Circassians as the "religion of the Russians." As a result, those who maintained their Christian faith gradually abandoned their faith and Christianity began to face severe public backlash. The last traces of Christianity in Circassia survived until the 1830s.

=== Islam ===
==== Early periods ====
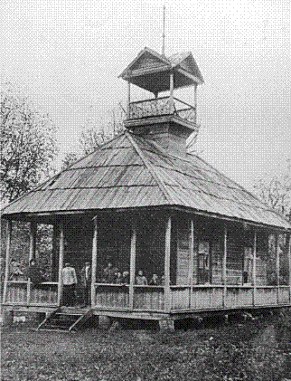
The Old Shapsug Mosque, Thaghapsh village. The only remaining 19th-century mosque in Sochi okrug.

The only Abrahamic religion that remained enduring among the Circassians was Islam. A small Muslim community had existed in Circassia since the Middle Ages. In 815, two Arab da'is, Abu Iskhaq and Muhammad Kindi, came to Circassia to spread Islam; as a result of these activities, a small number of Circassians converted to Islam.

In 1382, Barquq, a Circassian of slave origin in Egypt, seized power and declared himself sultan. During this period, the state became known as the "State of the Circassians" (Arabic: دولة الجراكسة). Although the majority of Circassians were not yet Muslim at the time, the Circassian Mamluks in Egypt were, and throughout the Mamluk sultanate, they strove to spread Islam in Circassia.

With the conquest of Constantinople in 1453, Mehmed II severed the Circassians' ties with the Orthodox world, paving the way for their conversion to Islam. Following this event, Islam gradually began to spread among the Circassians. With the Ottomans' elimination of the Genoese remnants, Circassia's relationship with the Catholic world also ended. According to historian Tursun Beg, the Ottomans' primary goal in this policy was to strengthen Islam among the Circassians.

With the conquest of Trebizond in 1461, Ottoman influence extended to Circassia, and many Circassian aristocrats embraced Sunni Islam. However, even by the 16th century, Muslims were a minority in Circassia; most of the population still practiced Christianity or traditional pagan beliefs.

==== Conversion to Islam ====
The Kabardian Circassians had long been under Muslim influence from Dagestan and were therefore the first Circassian community to embrace Islam. In 1570, some Kabardian aristocrats converted to Islam under the influence of the Tatars; in 1578, the Grand Prince of Kabardia officially converted. Remains of mosques from this period survive to this day.

In Western Circassia, Islam entered Circassian culture not directly, but through stories and folk tales. Ceremonies celebrating the birth of the Islamic prophet Muhammad gradually became common among the people. Following the Kabardians, the Hatuqay, Zhaney, Barakay (an Abazin tribe), and Besleney tribes also converted to Islam.

Evliya Çelebi, who visited Circassia in 1666, wrote that mosques existed in the villages and that the people chanted "la ilahe illallah" (There is no god but Allah), but they failed to fully grasp Islam and continued their old traditions. During the same period, Katip Çelebi stated that some Circassians were Muslim, while others were still considered "infidels". It is also known that a very small Shia community existed due to Iranian influence.

In the 17th century, Christianity had largely lost its influence among the Circassians, and Islam was spreading superficially and slowly, intertwined with paganism.

In the 17th century, Giovanni Luca wrote about the religion of the Circassians:

...Some are followers of the religion of Muhammad, others practice the Byzantine Rite (Orthodox Christianity), but the first one is more numerous...

In 1717, Crimean Khan Devlet III Giray issued an edict ordering the killing of Christian priests in the region and the burning of religious books. By the late 18th century, Islam began to spread more rapidly among the Circassians.

During this period, the Abzakh Circassians first converted to Islam. The Shapsugs, disturbed by the Abzakh's conversion to Islam, fought against them, but by the 1730s, the Shapsugs had also converted. Then, the Natukhajs, resenting the Shapsugs' conversion to Islam, declared them traitors and declared war on them. Nevertheless, the Natukhaj eventually started to embrace Islam and even emblazoned the name of Muhammad on their flag in the 19th century.

While Islam slowly took root in the coastal regions, the people maintained their old beliefs and traditions for a time. Among the Circassian principalities in the Kuban basin, Islam was much more established, although some of the old customs were preserved. In 1737, Jabagh Qazanoqo was appointed chief judge of Kabarda and reformed the justice system, incorporating Quranic principles into the Adyghe Khabze.

In 1779, with the encouragement of Ferah Ali Pasha, 85 new mosques were built in Circassia. Then, in 1785, Sheikh Mansur arrived in the region and led the Circassians in attacks against Russian forces. His call led many Circassians to convert to Islam. However, Sheikh Mansur was later captured by the Russians and imprisoned in the Shlisselburg Fortress, where he spent the rest of his life.

The activities of wandering Sufis and the threat of invasion from Russia further accelerated the Islamization process in Circassia. Circassian scholars who grew up in Ottoman lands also played a significant role in this process. Taitbout de Marigny, who visited the region in the 1820s, reported that the Circassians were predominantly Muslim, but they also respected the symbol of the Cross.

Karl Heinrich Koch, who visited Circassia in the first half of the 19th century, described the religious beliefs of the Circassians:

...It was possible for three different faiths to coexist simultaneously within a Circassian family. The grandfather might worship natural forces and sacred trees, while the father might embrace Christianity and the son might become Muslim. Most strikingly, there was no conflict or disagreement between these different faiths...

Throughout the 19th century, the vast majority of Circassians were Muslim. In 1826, Islam was declared the official religion of all Circassia. That same year, Hasan Pasha abolished the privileges granted to the nobles of the Natukhai, Shapsugh, and Abzakh tribes. Circassian ethnographer Sultan Khan-Giray wrote in 1830:

The only religion of the Circassians is Islam, which adheres to the Sunni sect. Their warlike lifestyle causes them to disregard the rules of their religion. Despite this, many are ready to defend even the slightest insult to their faith at the risk of their lives. I have frequently encountered among them individuals so fanatical in religious matters that they surpass even the Turks and who meticulously follow the teachings of their clergy.

The clergy did not form a powerful class in Circassia. James Bell, who spoke with a Circassian about religion, wrote the following about the Circassians' faith:

...When speaking about their current religious system, the Circassian mentioned the four authoritative books on which the religion is founded: the Bible, especially, as far as I could understand, part of the Old Testament; the Psalms of David; the Evangelist books (Matthew, Mark, Luke, and John); and the Quran. However, he argued that Muhammad's revelation was more worthy of respect than that of Jesus, as it was received directly from God Himself.

In the mid-19th century, Circassians began writing in the Arabic alphabet and using Muslim names; Arabic words began to enter the language. Islam in Circassia challenged the established nobility and strengthened the lower classes' demand for equality. According to James Bell, the lower classes strove for equality in accordance with the rules prescribed by the Quran. The aim of the rising Sharia movement during this period was to abolish nobility and slavery and to unite all social segments against Russian occupation. The movement was led by clergy and Circassian leaders; later, three representatives of Imam Shamil also tried to achieve this goal.

By 1837, those who defected to the Russian side were declared traitors in Friday sermons. In 1840, the non-Muslim Circassian minority also offered mass Shahada under the rule of Naib Muhammad Amin. During the same period, Seferbiy Zaneqo declared in a letter to the Russian Tsar that the Circassians "from youngest to oldest had become Muslims."

In 1841, a large meeting was held on the Pshekh River; these meetings were held regularly to decide on matters concerning the country. At the 1841 meeting, a contract, known as "the defter," was adopted with the approval of all Circassian leaders without exception. The first article of the contract read:

Our first duty is the strict implementation of the Sharia. Any teachings contrary to it must be abandoned and rejected, and all crimes must be judged solely according to the Quran.

With the assumption of power in Circassia by Imam Shamil's viceroy, Muhammad Amin Asiyalav, the integration of Islam among the Circassians accelerated, and the implementation of Sharia law began. Although many Circassians were happy to be freed from what they considered an oppressive government after Muhammad Amin's surrender to the Russians, his reign can be said to have been extremely influential in the establishment of Islam among the Circassians.

By the end of the war, the process of Islamization had become so complete that the Circassians who managed to reach the Ottoman Empire during the Circassian genocide chanted takbir in gratitude for the end of their journey.

Historically, "traditional Islam" in Circassia, Sunni Islam of the Hanafi school, accommodated the rules of Adyghe Khabze, allowing customary laws to regulate communal life, social behavior, and conflict resolution alongside religious practices. Being a good Muslim (Adyghe: Быслъымэныгъэ; Kabardian: Муслъымэныгъэ) involved following Khabze in addition to knowledge of the Quran and observance of Islamic rituals. Those who embodied this synthesis were considered the cultured, pious elite of society. This principle gave birth to the creed "The Creator is in heaven and the Adygaghe granted by Him is on earth".

However, following the collapse of the Soviet Union, the region experienced a surge of foreign Islamic influences, including Salafism (often referred to locally as Wahhabism), a reformist movement seeking to "purify" the Islamic faith. Unlike traditional Sunni Islam, Salafism was hostile towards Khabze, viewing the historical co-existence of Islam and Khabze as a deviation from the faith. The Salafi movement sought to operate as a universalist project that actively strips Islam of any ethnic or local content. Consequently, Salafis rejected the customary laws of Khabze and demanded the eradication of local norms, leading to hostility between believers of "traditional Islam" and "Salafi Islam". The Salafi movement declared adherents of traditional Islam as infidels (takfir). In response, Islamic scholars and chief spiritual officiers of the Caucasus region defended "traditional Islam" and its coexistence with local customs against the Salafi movement. In some cases, the tension between the two parties has escalated into factional violence, particularly in Kabardino-Balkaria. Folk leaders advocating for Khabze traditions have been assassinated. The Salafi movement also assassinated Islamic scholars who defended "Traditional Islam", such as the deputy mufti of Dagestan, Ahmad Tagayev, the rector of the Islamic institute in Cherkessk, Ismail Bostanov, rector of the Islamic University of the North Caucasus, Maksid Sadikov, as well as the mufti of Kabadino-Balkaria, Anas Pshikhachev. Pshikhachev was known for defending traditional Sunni Islam and accusing the Salafis of being deviants, serving as the leader of the traditional movement. Despite the tensions, Salafis remain a small minority among the Muslims of the Caucasus. The local clergy has also declared their adherence to "traditional Islam" and their strong opposition to "untraditional" Salafi Islam.

One of the most important Islamic texts in the Adyghe language is the Adyghe Mawlid, a translation of Süleyman Çelebi's Ottoman Turkish text, "Vesîletü'n-Necât". This translation was undertaken by the Circassian scholar Abdurrahman Efendi. The Adyghe Mawlid is written in the Shapsug dialect, with a very large number of Arabic, Turkish Persian loanwords. The original publication utilized a modified Arabic/Ottoman alphabet, incorporating specialized marks and letters to represent unique Circassian phonemes that do not exist in standard Ottoman Turkish. Poetically, the translation remains highly faithful to Süleyman Çelebi's original structure. It consists of 1,034 lines (517 couplets) and strictly adheres to the classical remel meter (fâilâtun fâilâtun fâilun). The text is recited in Circassian villages to this day. A section:

АллахьыцIэр зикрэу тэжъугъэшI шъыпкъэгье
Тэ тичIыфэу зэрэхъугъэм фэшIыгье.

АллахьыцIэр къэзыIорэм анахьэу
IофыхэрикI къыфэхъун ащ IэшIэхэу.

IэллахьыцIэр зыщыраIоу зы IофикI
РэкIодырэп къадэмыхъоу зы IофикI.

АллахьыцIэр фэпщэ къэси Iо зэпыт
УэлIэжьыфэ Аллахь Аллахь Iо зэпыт.

ИцIэ къабзэ къабзэу рэхъун езыIор,
Имуради лъыIэсын Аллахь зыIор.

ГIэшкъыгье зэ жэгье Аллахь къэтэгъаIу
Дэрдыгье хигь тигугье Iаахь къэтэгъаIу.

Тыщыгугъун игучIэгъу Ар падишахь,
Ар Керимэу Ар Рахьыймэу Ар Iилахь.

Зэрэзэм Ащ изэкъуагъэм шек хэлъэп
Зыгъэзакъор джыхьэнэмым илъынэп.

ГъэшIыгъэхэр щымыIахэу ар щыIагъ,
ГъэшIыгъэмэ афэлъагэу Ар щыIагъ.

Ар зыщэIэм щыIэгъагъэп цIыф мелек,
Уашъуи чIыгуий мази тыгъий зикI фелек.

Ащ ыужым гъэшIыгъэхэр къыгъэшIыгъ
ФэпщылIыным фэшIыхэгье къыгъэшIыгъ.

Translation:

Let us truly make the name of Allah our remembrance,
Because it has become our sacred duty.

Whoever utters the name of Allah,
Their affairs will easily be accomplished for them.

Any deed during which the name of Allah is mentioned,
Will not perish, nor will it go unfulfilled.

Say the name of Allah constantly with every breath,
Until you die, continually say "Allah, Allah."

The one who utters His pure name becomes pure,
The one who says "Allah" will attain their goal.

Let us say "Allah" with divine love,
Let us cry "Ah" from the sorrow in our hearts.

We will place our hope in His mercy, He is the Sovereign King,
He is the Generous, He is the Merciful, He is God.

There is no doubt in His Oneness,
Whoever affirms His Oneness will not burn in Hell.

He existed before any creations came to be,
He existed, exalted above all creations.

When He existed, there was neither human nor angel,
Neither sky nor earth, neither moon nor sun, nor any celestial sphere.

Only after that did He bring creations into being,
He created them for the purpose of serving and worshipping Him.

== Contemporary era ==
Religion in Adygea as of 2012 (Sreda Arena Atlas)
Russian Orthodoxy	35.4%
Other Orthodox	1.4%
Other Christians	3.8%
Islam	12.6%
Spiritual but not religious	29.8%
Atheism and irreligion	9.2%
Other and undeclared	7.8%

=== Adygea ===
According to a 2012 survey which interviewed 56,900 people, 35.4% of the population of Adygea adheres to the Russian Orthodox Church, 12.6% to Islam, 3% are unaffiliated Christians and 1% are Orthodox Christian believers who don't belong to church or are members of other Orthodox churches. In addition, 30% of the population declares to be "spiritual but not religious", 9% is atheist, and 8.6% follows other religions or did not answer to the question.

=== Kabardino-Balkaria ===
Religion in Kabardino-Balkaria as of 2012 (Sreda Arena Atlas)
Islam	70.8%
Russian Orthodoxy	11.6%
Other Christians	4%
Circassian paganism	1.8%
Spiritual but not religious	5.6%
Atheism and irreligion	4.4%
Other and undeclared	1.8%

According to a 2012 survey which interviewed 56,900 people, 70.8% of the population of Kabardino-Balkaria adheres to Islam, 11.6% to the Russian Orthodox Church, 1.8% to Circassian paganism and other indigenous faiths, 3.8% are unaffiliated generic Christians. In addition, 12% of the population declares to be "spiritual but not religious", 5.6% is Atheist or follows other religions including Jehovah's Witnesses.

=== Krasnodar Krai ===
Religion in Krasnodar Krai as of 2012 (Sreda Arena Atlas)
Russian Orthodoxy	52.2%
Other Orthodox	0.9%
Old Believers	0.5%
Other Christians	3.5%
Islam	1.3%
Spiritual but not religious	22.5%
Atheism and irreligion	13.2%
Other and undeclared	5.9%

According to a 2012 survey 52.2% of the population of Krasnodar Krai adheres to the Russian Orthodox Church, 3% are unaffiliated generic Christians, 1% are either Orthodox Christian believers who don't belong to church or members of non-Russian Orthodox churches, and 1% are Muslims. In addition, 22% of the population declares to be "spiritual but not religious", 13% is atheist, and 7.8% follows other religions or did not give an answer to the question.

=== Karachay-Cherkessia ===
Religion in Karachay-Cherkessia as of 2012 (Sreda Arena Atlas)
Russian Orthodoxy	13.2%
Other Christians	1.8%
Islam	64%
Circassian paganism	2%
Spiritual but not religious	10%
Atheism and irreligion	3%
Other and undeclared	6%

According to a 2012 survey which interviewed 56,900 people, 64% of the population of Karachay-Cherkessia adheres to Islam, 13% to the Russian Orthodox Church, 2% to the Karachay and Circassian native faith, 2% are unaffiliated Christians, unchurched Orthodox Christian believers or members of non-Russian Orthodox churches. In addition, 10% of the population declares to be "spiritual but not religious", 3% are atheist, and 6% are other/undeclared.
