= Crimean–Circassian War (1518) =

Military conflict

- Part of Crimean–Circassian wars
Date	July – December 1518
Location	Circassia (Kabarda)
Result	Circassian victory

Belligerents
Crimean Khanate	Kabardia (East Circassia)

Commanders and leaders
Bahadır Giray; Mehmed I Giray	Unknown

Strength
~30,000	Unknown

Casualties and losses
Significant losses, approximately 2/3 of the army lost	Minor losses

Crimean–Circassian War of 1518 was a military conflict between the Crimean Khanate and the Kabardian Principality. The defeat paused Crimean attacks on Circassian states for a time

== History ==
In July 1518, Bahadır Giray, son of the Crimean Khan Mehmed I Giray, informed Moscow that the Crimean Tatars had initially moved toward the Don River against the approaching Astrakhan prince Bibey. However, not finding their enemy, they decided instead to attack the Circassians: "And... not having found our enemy, we thought to go to the Cherkasy, and thus we went there."

Bahadır-Giray also added that "we have annual wars with the Cherkasy," confirming the reports of Venetian diplomat Giorgio Interiano about the ongoing war between the Tatars and Circassians. This campaign of 1518 was not the first major Crimean military action against the Adyghe people.

The large Crimean force moved through the steppe across the lower Don, seemingly intending to avoid conflict with the Zhaney tribe and other western Circassians by bypassing Taman and striking directly at Kabardia from the north. However, the Kabardians decisively defeated the Crimean army.

In December 1518, Russian envoy Ivan Chelishchev reported from Crimea about Bahadır-Giray’s campaign into Kabardia and his crushing defeat. According to his account, only a third of the Crimean forces returned home.
