= Ottoman-Crimean Invasion of Circassia (1479–1490) =

Series of 15th-century military conflicts

Crimean-Circassian War (1479–1490)
- Part of Crimean–Circassian wars
Date	1479–1490
Location	Circassia
Result	Ottoman–Crimean victory
Territorial changes	Ottomans establish control over Anapa and Kopa

Belligerents
Crimean Khanate; Ottoman Empire	Circassia; Kabardia (East Circassia)

Commanders and leaders
Mengli I Giray (Ottoman Empire) Cezeri Kasim Pasha	(Circassia) Peterzeqo; Tabuldu

Strength
(Ottoman Empire) 50,000–70,000	Unknown

Casualties and losses
Unknown	Many enslaved

The Ottoman–Crimean Invasion of Circassia took place between 1479 and 1490 and marked the beginning of systematic Ottoman influence in the North Caucasus. During this period, the Ottomans promoted Islam among the Circassians, successfully converting mainly the aristocracy, while much of the general population remained pagan or Christian.

== Background ==
By the late 15th century, the Ottoman Empire was expanding its influence into the Black Sea region. The strategic location of the North Caucasus, with access to the coastline, made Circassia a region of interest. The Crimean Khanate, an Ottoman vassal state, shared these interests, particularly in slave raids and control over trade routes.

== History ==
In 1479, a campaign of the Crimean Tatars took place on the lands of the Circassians. They outnumbered the Kabardians and captured the fortresses of Kopa and Anapa, where many Turkish garrisons were left. Some Circassians were captured and sold into slavery meanwhile others kept on fighting.

At the very beginning of the 1490s, the Crimean Khan Mengli Gerai undertook a campaign against the Circassians. This was the first campaign of the Crimean khans in a series of numerous campaigns against the tribes of the Circassians, Circassians and Kabardians in order to conquer and subdue them.
