= Šķēde Manor =

Manor house in Latvia

- Courland, Latvia
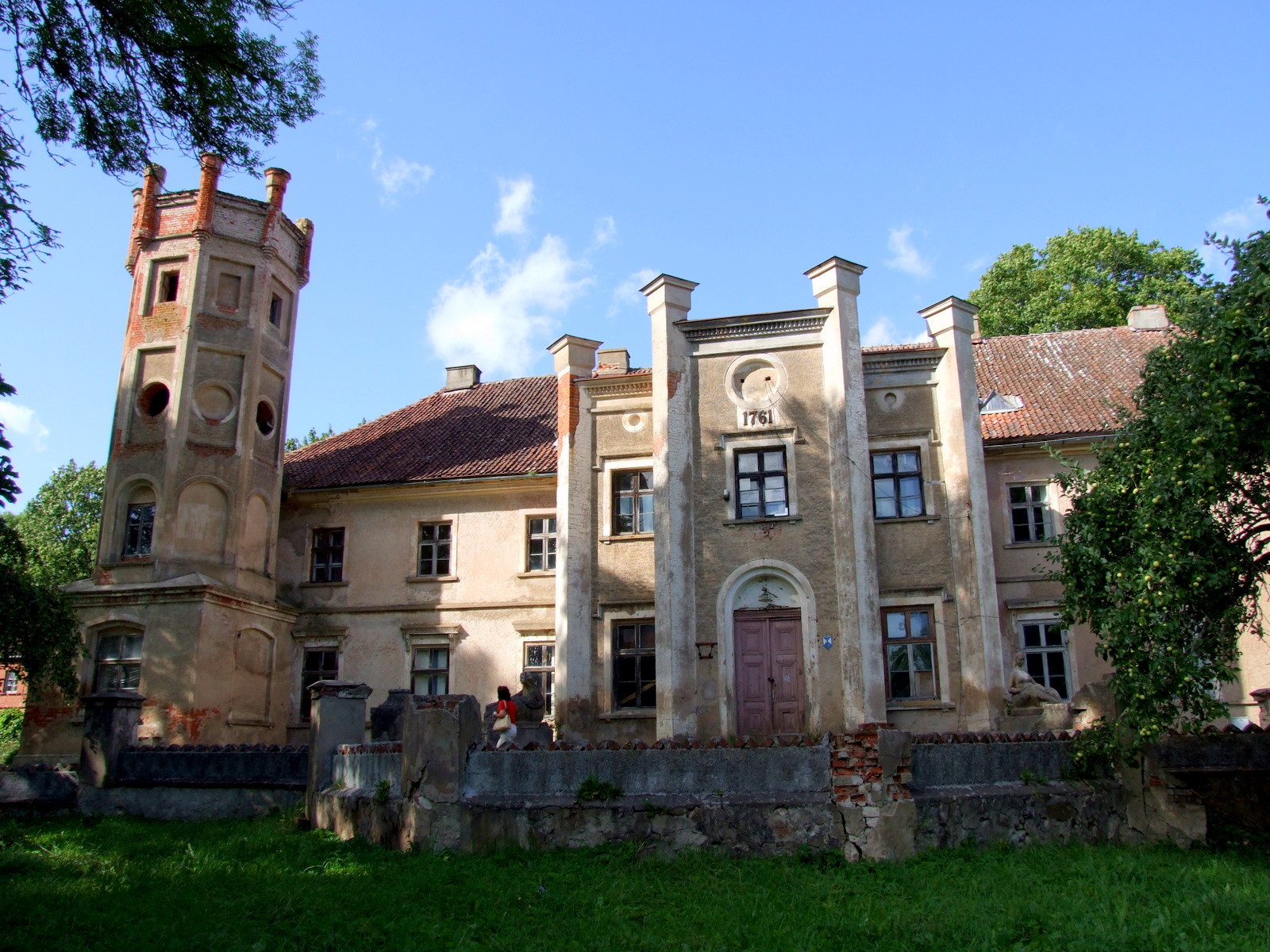

Site information
- Type: Manor

Location
- Coordinates: 56°51′09.6″N 22°23′09.1″E

Site history
- Built: 1761

Šķēde Manor (Latvian: Šķēdes muižas pils, German: Scheden) is a manor house in Šķēde Parish, Saldus Municipality in the Courland region of Latvia.

== History ==
The manor was first mentioned in 1461, when the master of the order Johann Osthoff von Mengede granted Johann Loewe and his heirs a plot called the Schedule. In 1501 the Master of the Livonian Order Wolter von Plettenberg gave it to Merten von den Brinken, whose family has owned it for 200 years. In 1729, H.H. von den Brinken's widow Margaret Veronica sells it to her son Gideon Heinrich von Zass.

The Scheden Manor was built in the 18th century. A barns has been built on both sides of the parade courtyard, at the end of which the one-story masonry house was standing. Behind the road was a farm yard with stables, barns, outbuildings and a mill pond. The manor house was completed in 1761. The 2nd floor was built in the early 19th century. At the end of the 19th century a new entrance and a corner tower were built, as well as an extension. In 1883 the owner was George von Zass, who later died here. The manor remains owned by the von Zass family until 1921. In 1921 the manor was taken over by the Kuldīga County Board and its center was leased to private persons. From 1925 to 1927, the palace housed the first-grade primary school and later became privately owned. The owner of the building from 1928 to 1940 was Jānis Laudams, inspector of Kuldīga County Folk High Schools. The manor house was used as a Wehrmacht army hospital during World War II.

After World War II, the building housed the board of the Soviet farm Viesturi, from 1946 to 1991 - Viesturi village library. In 2004, consulting company SIA "Neibergs un partneri" bought it in auction for 48 000 Ls (65 203 EUR). Although some maintenance work has reportedly been done indoors and on the grounds, the manor is in a rundown condition. The managing company has links to the company behind the current owners of the derelict Kaucminde Manor.

== See also ==
- List of palaces and manor houses in Latvia
