= Zelenchuk ambush =

- Part of the Russo-Circassian War
Date	August 1833
Location	Bolshoy Zelenchuk, Krasnodar Krai
Result	Russian victory

Belligerents
Russian Empire	Circassia

Commanders and leaders
Grigory Zass	Unknown

Strength
350 Cossacks; 2 infantry companies	100 Circassians

Casualties and losses
Unknown	Heavy

The Zelenchuk ambush was a military engagement between the Russian Empire and Circassians during the Russo-Circassian War in which Russian forces located and completely destroyed a detachment of 100 Circassians.

== Background ==
In July 1833, Grigory Zass was appointed commander of the Batalpashinsky section of the Kuban Line. Soon he began fighting Circassians using brutal tactics.

== Raid ==
In August, Zass undertook his first expedition into Circassian territory. Having learned in advance from his scouts that about 100 Circassians were hiding on the left bank of the Kuban planning a raid, he assembled a detachment of 350 Cossacks, two companies of foot soldiers, and two field guns and crossed the Kuban river. After about 80 kilometers, near Bolshoy Zelenchuk, Zass noticed enemy scouts shadowing him. He ordered his infantry to take cover in the forest, while he himself remained in the clearing with the Cossacks to provoke the Circassians into attack. As planned, the warriors attacked his Cossacks, only to be met with grapeshot from the two guns. Disorganized, the Circassians retreated, heading straight for the small woods where the infantrymen were waiting to be deployed. As soon as they were close enough, the Russians fired several volleys into their ranks. The Circassians fled the battlefield in a hurry.

== Aftermath ==
The first expedition of Grigory into Circassian territory proved to be successful. In the months following this raid Zass continued to raid and plunder Circassian territory, devastating the Circassian population. Zass developed a reputation of an extremely harsh commander, and was portrayed as Satan in Circassian folklore.
