= Assault on Germenchuk =

1832 military action against Germenchuk

- Part of the Murid War
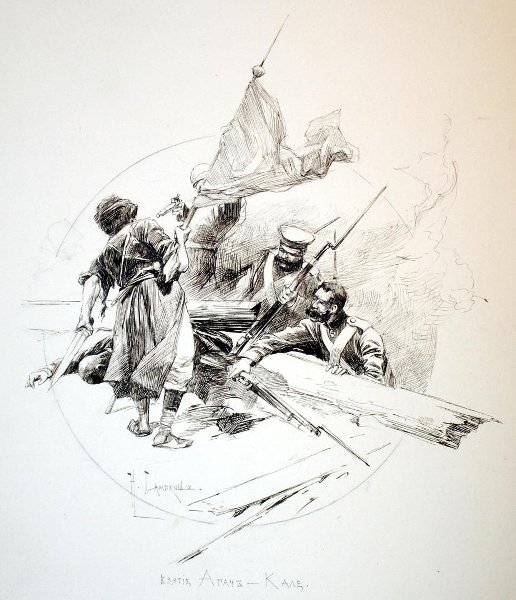
- Taking the fortification from the highlanders in 1831
Date	23 August 1832
Location	Germenchuk, Chechnya
Result	Russian victory

Belligerents
Russian Empire	Caucasian Imamate

Commanders and leaders
(Russian Empire) A. A. Velyaminov (Russian Empire) G. V. Rosen (Russian Empire) Grigory Zass (WIA)	Ghazi Muhammad; Abdurakhman Germenchuk †

Strength
Up to 9,000 men 24 light guns 4 mountain unicorns	3,800

Casualties and losses
300 men killed (of which 2 officers); Unknown wounded	70 men (total losses unknown)

The Assault on Germenchuk, also known as the Battle of Germenchuk, was a military engagement fought between the forces of the Caucasian Imamate and the Russian Empire on 23 August 1832. This battle was one of the key engagements of the Murid War, with some 9,000 Russian troops under the command of General A. A. Velyaminov stormed the Chechen village, where they met 3,800 defenders.

== Background ==
During the Caucasian War, the command of the Caucasian Separate Corps took active steps in Chechnya. On 5 August 1832, Baron G. Rozen exterminated the village of Daud-Martan, Colonel G. Zass set fire to the village of Pkhan-kichu and devastated the arable land of the villagers. During 6-7 August, Major General Prince Bekovich-Cherkassky destroyed residential buildings in the village of Achkhoy, the commander of the Butyrsky infantry regiment, Colonel Piryatinsky burned to the ground the villages of Elmurza-Yurt and Allaha-Irzo-Yurt.

On 7 August, the same Colonel Piryatinsky razed the villages of Shaudon-Shari and Katri-Yurt to the ground. On 8 August, the villages of Dzulgu-yurt, Galgai-yurt, Altemir-yurt were exterminated. On 9 August, the villages of Shalazh and Umakhan-Yurt expressed their obedience, on the same day Bekovich-Cherkassky destroyed the village of Nurki. On 10 August, the village of Gekhi was captured. After Shali, it was Germenchuk’s turn.

== The course of the battle ==
Germenchuk was 4.64 miles from Shali. The Russian detachment crossed the Argun and spent the night in Shali. By noon, the detachment took up positions in full view of the mountaineers waiting for them. On the left flank, the Russians had a river, on the right — a dense forest, where the Lezgin cavalry and Chechen infantry stood. The village was surrounded by trenches on three sides. Behind the village was a dense forest. Cossacks under the command of Zass, Georgian and Tatar cavalry began a skirmish with the Chechen cavalry.

Artillery under the command of Velyaminov opened fire. Zass Cossacks were sent to the forest to cover the right flank of the attackers. The left Russian flank was covered by Caucasian regiments. After the artillery preparation, the Butyrsky and Jaeger battalions went on the attack. The Chechens, who had waited out the shelling in the trenches, fired a volley, but did not have time to reload their rifles. Storming advanced columns broke into the village. Part of the village adjacent to the forest remained under the control of the defenders, but they had to leave the right flank. The Cossacks, pursuing the Lezgins, came under rifle fire. Velyaminov sent an adjutant to Zass with an order to return to the battery.

=== Zass cavalry attack ===
The Zass Cossacks, returning to the battery, came under fire from the Chechens from the left flank of the Germenchuk trench. The Cossacks turned to the trench and soon found themselves in front of a blockage. They jumped off their horses and found themselves out of the fire zone of the village defenders. The Chechens began to wait for the appearance of the attackers, but could not stand it and fired a volley. The Cossacks and Georgians at the same moment rushed to the attack and captured the fortification.

Zass on the way to the blockage was wounded in the leg. Not far from him lay Prince Andronikov, wounded in the chest. Two more wounded officers were found nearby. Hand-to-hand fighting in the village continued, but the thicket of the scales leaned in favor of the Russians, the Chechens retreated under their onslaught.

== Assault surrounded ==
The defenders were forced to leave the village, but about a hundred Chechens, cut off from the forest, settled in three adjacent houses and did not want to give up. They killed one lieutenant colonel and wounded many soldiers. The Sackleys were cordoned off by a triple line of skirmishers lying on the ground, behind the wattle fences and behind the trees. No one dared to appear in front of the enemy: with a right eye, a directed bullet punished the careless … Gunners from the Brimmer team drove a light gun, the shot pierced through all three houses, but the cannonballs were a danger to the attackers from the other side, so the fire had to stop.

Volkhovsky felt sorry for the brave people, he ordered the translator, the old Mozdok Cossack Atarshchikov, who was with us, to offer them to lay down their arms, promising in this case, on behalf of the chief commander, not only life, but also the right to be exchanged for Russian prisoners, which opened up hope for them someday to return to their families. The fire fell silent when Atarshchikov stepped forward and shouted in Chechen that he wanted to speak. Those who were sitting in the houses listened to the proposal, consulted for several minutes, then a half-naked Chechen, blackened from the smoke, came out, made a short speech and – shots flashed from all the loopholes. The answer consisted in the following words: – We do not want mercy; we ask the Russians for one favor, let them let our families know that we died, as we lived, not submitting to someone else's power

Then the houses were set on fire. The defenders tried to escape from the fire, but died under the fire of the attackers. Six wounded Lezgins were taken out from under the smoking ruins. Not a single Chechen gave up. Seventy-two people burned.

Officer Fyodor Tornau recalled:

The final act of the bloody drama played out; night covered the stage. Each conscientiously did his job: the main actors departed into eternity; other actors and behind them the spectators with a stone in their hearts began to disperse to the tents: and it may turn out that more than one in the depths of his soul asked himself the question – what is all this for? Is there no place on earth for everyone, regardless of language and faith?

== In poetry ==
In 1832, the poet Alexander Polezhaev, who, in the ranks of the Moscow Infantry Regiment, also took part in the assault on the village, dedicated his poem to the village of Germenchuk — «Germenchug Cemetery»:

… Perhaps in the battle she revived
She is the motherland’s abusive spirit
And again called for revenge
Hidden in the ashes of Germenchug…
