= Battle of Djemptlokh =

Battle between Circassians and Russian forces during the Russo-Circassian War (1841)

Coordinates: 44.7580°N 39.7626°E

- Part of Russo-Circassian War
Date	1841
Location	Between the Belaya (Shaguash) and Pshikh rivers
Result	Circassian victory

Belligerents
(Circassia) Abzakh Circassians	(Russia) Russian Empire

Commanders and leaders
Abadzekh tribal leaders (names unknown)	Grigory Zass (WIA)

Strength
Unknown	Unknown

Casualties and losses
Unknown, but lower than Russian losses	Heavy (exact numbers unknown)

The Battle of Djemptlokh, also known as the Ambush at the Sacred Grove, took place in 1841 during the Russo-Circassian War between the forces of the Russian Empire and the Abadzekh tribe of the Circassians.

== Background ==
In 1841, during the Russo-Circassian War, General G. X. Zass led a Russian military expedition between the Belaya (Shaguash) and Pshikh rivers in the Caucasus region, aiming to subdue the Circassian tribes and assert Russian dominance over the area.

This area included the Jemtlokh Forest, a sacred site for the Circassians, who revered it as dedicated to the god Tkhagalegu. The local tribes fiercely protected this holy land and held annual rituals, including sacrifices, at this site. The Circassians believed that violating the sacred grove would bring divine retribution.

== Battle ==
Zass' forces were ambushed by the Circassians, who used their knowledge of the terrain and guerrilla tactics to inflict heavy casualties on the Russian troops. Zass himself was wounded in the engagement.

The Circassians believed that their god had punished Zass for violating the sacred grounds of the forest. The attack resulted in heavy Russian losses and forced the troops to retreat.

== Aftermath ==
The Russian defeat in this raid was a temporary setback, but it did not significantly hinder the overall Russian expansion. Nevertheless, the Circassians' successful defense of their sacred forest boosted their morale.
