= Johann Osthoff von Mengede =

Master of Livonian Order from 1450 to 1469

Johann von Mengede (also Johann von Mengden, called Osthof) (c. 1400 – 15 August 1469) was a knight of the Teutonic Knights. Most notably, from 1442 to 1450, he was Komtur of Reval and then from 1450 to 1469 a Master (Landmiester) of the Livonian Order. He was elected as the Landmaster of Livonia in April, 1450.

He is the best known representative of the noble family from Mengede.

== History ==
In 1461–1464, when Landmaster of Livonia Johann von Mengede arrested the Archbishop of Riga, Silvester Stodewescher and plundered Archbishopic lands, troops from Pskov occupied the eastern part of the Archbishopic lands — Adzele (presently Pytalovo). Adzele inhabitants were either deported or converted to Orthodoxy.
