= Grigory Zass =

Russian Imperial cavalry general (1797–1883)

Baron Grigory von Zass
- Григорий фон Засс
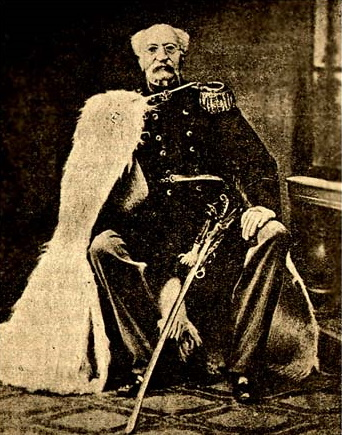
- Born: 29 April 1797
- Died: 4 December 1883 (aged 86); Šķēde Manor, Courland Governorate, Russian Empire
- Monuments: Monument to General G. H. Zass
- Citizenship: Russian Empire
- Occupation: Military officer
- Known for: Russian general, participant in the Caucasian War. He is known for pursuing an extremely cruel policy in which he intimidated the Circassians as part of the Circassian genocide.
- Notable work: Founded the city of Armavir in Krasnodar Krai
- Title: Baron
- Spouse: Baroness Wilhelmina Manteuffel
- Parents: Kreiss Marshal Georg Christoph Sass (father); Countess Annette Kettler (mother)
- Call sign: Zassovsky
- Military career
- Allegiance: Tsar of Russia
- Branch: Imperial Russian Army
- Service years: 1813–1848 (initial enlistment); 1849–1864 (2nd enlistment); 1864–1883 (Caucasian Reserve Army)
- Rank: General of Cavalry
- Units: Grodno Hussar Regiment, Pskov Cuirassier Regiment, Nizhny Novgorod Dragoon Regiment, Mozdok Cossack Regiment, Caucasian Army
- Commands: Batalpashinsky section of the Kuban line, 1833; Entire Kuban line, 1835; Chief of the right flank of the Caucasian line, 1840; The vanguard of the 3rd Corps, 1849
- Conflict: See list: Napoleonic Wars; War of the Sixth Coalition; German campaign; Battle of Dresden; Battle of Kulm; Battle of Leipzig; Campaign in north-east France; Siege of Metz; Battle of Brienne; Battle of Bar-sur-Aube; Battle of Arcis-sur-Aube; Battle of Fère-Champenoise; Battle of Paris; Hundred Days; Russo-Turkish War; Caucasian War; Assault on Germenchuk (WIA); Russo-Circassian War; Zelenchuk ambush; Battle of Laba River; Battle of Djemptlokh (WIA); Hungarian Campaign
- Awards: Order of St. George; Order of Saint Vladimir; Order of Saint Anna; Order of Saint Stanislaus; St. George's Cross; Golden Weapon Award

Grigory Khristoforovich von Zass (Russian: Григорий Христофорович фон Засс; German: Georg Otto Ewald Freiherr von Saß; 1797–1883) was an Imperial Russian general who commanded Russian cavalry troops in the Napoleonic Wars and Russo-Circassian War, initially gaining prominence for his genocidal actions against the Circassians, whom he reportedly saw as a "lowly race". He was the founder of the city of Armavir, Russia.

In 2003, the Russian Federation erected his statue on former Circassian territories, infuriating Circassians and Circassian nationalist establishments worldwide.

== Biography ==
=== Early life ===
Zass (Georg Otto Ewald von Sass or Saß in German) was born into a Baltic German noble family. His ancestors were nobles from Westphalia who in the 15th century moved to the Baltic region, fought under the banner of the Order of the Sword, and in 1710, was among the 52 chivalric families, including the Ungern-Sternbergs and Wrangel family, which took a solemn oath of allegiance to the Russian sovereign, Peter the Great. In 1813 at the age of fifteen, he entered military service as a cadet in the Grodno Hussar Regiment. He rose through the ranks of the Russian army and first saw action in the 1813 Battle of Leipzig. He was transferred to the Novgorod division in 1820.

=== Military career ===
==== Napoleonic Wars ====
Zass took part in the War of the Sixth Coalition with the Russian army in 1813–1814, in German campaign of 1813. He fought at Dresden, Kulm and Leipzig, was awarded the insignia of the Military Order and promoted to cornet, then participated in the battles in the 1814 campaign in north-east France at Brienne, Bar-sur-Aube, Arcis-sur-Aube, Metz, and Fère-Champenoise, and ended the fighting under the walls of Paris. In 1815 he was part of the Russian troops during the second campaign in France in the Hundred Days and took part in the famous parade near Vertus. After the end of the Napoleonic Wars, he served in the Pskov Cuirassier Regiment.

==== Russo-Turkish War (1828–1829) ====
In 1820 he transferred to the Nizhny Novgorod Dragoon Regiment, which fought in the Caucasus. He took part in the Russo-Turkish War of 1828–1829.

==== Russo-Circassian War ====
In 1830 Zass received command of the Mozdok Cossack Regiment as a result of his success in the Russo-Turkish War. With this regiment he undertook several successful expeditions against the Caucasian natives. In a 1832 battle against the Chechens, he was severely wounded while attempting to burn a village and consequentially promoted to colonel.

In 1833, he was appointed commander of the Batalpashinsky section of the Kuban Line. Having studied the military traditions of Caucasian natives and having mastered the tactics of mountain warfare, he tried to seize the initiative and began to carry out regular preventive measures, based on data received from numerous scouts. Active defense was complemented by cruel punitive expeditions, which ended, as a rule, with the extermination of villages. He was appointed as chief commander and given full authority.

In August, he led the first expedition into Circassian territory, destroying as many villages and towns as possible. This was followed by a series of other expeditions. He attacked the Besleney region between November and December, destroying most villages, including the village of the double agent Aytech Qanoqo.

Zass spent a significant amount of money on espionage. During attacks on Circassian land, he never forgot about reconnaissance tasks: his men thoroughly investigated all wooden beams that could serve as enemy shelter, demolished farms, and killed farmers so the enemy would not be able to get food. He made a list of all the Circassians he personally killed. His fearlessness and incredible awareness of the affairs of the Caucasians brought him an otherworldly status among the Circassians, who called Zass "Shaytan" (Satan). Circassian mothers reportedly frightened their children with the name of Zass.

In 1834, Zass sent a report to Georg Andreas von Rosen, a general in the Russian army, detailing his campaign into Circassia. He talks about how he killed three Circassian civilians:

I captured three Circassians from carriages that were on their way to fetch grass, other than the thirteen we already had, who did not wish to surrender to us voluntarily, so I ordered to kill them.

He then talks about how he destroyed a neighborhood:

The savages panicked and started fleeing from their homes, leaving their weapons behind attempting to escape to the forest but most of them were killed by the Cossacks ... with the soldiers lined up ready to fight, the cleansing continued with artillery shells, and I sent there two infantry brigades, but they could only capture 11 more people, and since the fire was in flames in many places, the rest were either killed or burned after attempting to escape by hiding on the roofs of their homes or by the manure. So like this, we destroyed and destructed the neighborhood.

Zass' main strategy was to intercept and retain the initiative, terrorize the Circassians, and destroy Circassian settlements. After a victory, he would usually burn several villages and seize cattle and horses to show off, acts which he proudly admitted. He paid close attention to the enemy's morale. In his reports, he frequently boasted about the destruction of villages and glorified the mass murder of civilians. The military successes of the regiments led by him were highly appreciated by the high command. He received as a reward several prestigious orders and a golden weapon with the inscription "For Bravery".

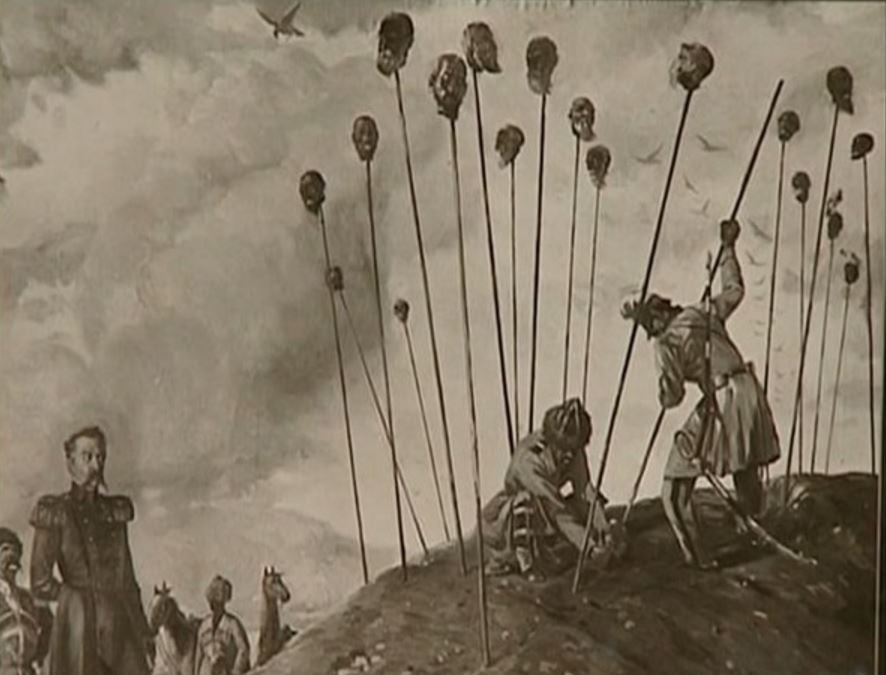
"Russian troops eagerly hoisting pikes spitted with the heads of fallen Circassians, with Russian general Grigory Zass savouring the gruesome act" by Nikolay Ivanovich Lorer

He continued to exterminate the Circassian population between 1834 and 1835, particularly in the Abdzakh, Besleney, Shapsug, and Kabardian regions. In 1835, he was promoted. The entire Kuban line was entrusted to his command, in 1836 he was promoted to major general, and in 1840 – to lieutenant general and appointed chief of the right flank of the Caucasian line. On his initiative, new fortifications began to be laid (one of them is called "Zassovsky") and new Orthodox Slavic villages were arranged, which was the beginning of the creation of the Labinskaya line.

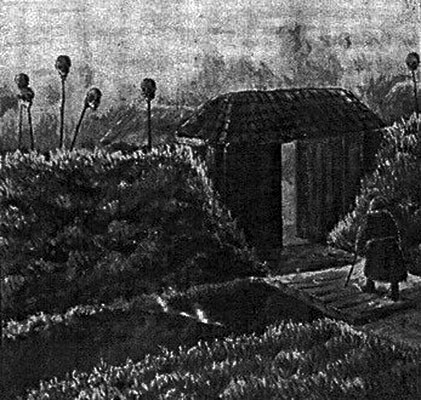
Zass's headquarters in the Caucasus, Prochnyi Okop (modern-day Prochnookopskaya)

Zass loved spreading rumors about himself by exploiting Circassian tribal superstitions. Using various tricks and cutting-edge technology, he was able to convince and deceive the Circassians into thinking that he had various magical abilities, including being bulletproof and able to turn gunpowder into gold. He was known as a magical man who could do anything he wanted to do. As a result, when he attacked, the Circassians believed they had no chance and suffered a significant loss of morale; knowing Zass's cruel methods, they mostly attempted to save their lives rather than fighting.

On 18 August, the Russian army burned the residency of Hajji Tlam, a Circassian elder from the Abdzakh region, and killed his family. As revenge, Circassian commander Jembulat Boletoqo made plans for a new campaign. General Zass sent Circassian commander Jembulat Boletoqo word in October 1836 that he wanted to make peace. Boletoqo considered the offer and decided to go.

Boletoqo visited Zass at his residence. For his initial visit, Zass was not present. Zass wrote him a letter and instructed him to come on a specific date when he would undoubtedly be in his residency. At the said date, Boletoqo was killed on non-warzone territory while on his way to the Prochnyi Okop fortress. The murderer was a Russian sniper employed by Zass, who was hiding in the forest on the Russian bank of the Kuban River, at the confluence with the Urup River. After this, in 1836, Zass was promoted again.

In 1838, Zass spread false rumors about his serious illness, then staged his own death, weakening the Circassians' vigilance. On the same night, when the Circassians were celebrating their oppressor's death, the suddenly "resurrected" Zass launched a raid that destroyed two villages.

In 1841, during the Russo-Circassian War, Zass led a Russian military expedition between the Belaya (Shaguash) and Pshikh rivers in the Caucasus, aiming to subdue the Circassian tribes. The operation targeted the Jemtlokh Forest, a sacred site for the Circassians dedicated to the god Tkhagalegu, where annual rituals and sacrifices were held.

Circassian forces ambushed the Russians, using guerrilla tactics and their knowledge of the terrain to inflict heavy casualties. Zass himself was wounded in the battle. The Circassians believed this was divine punishment for desecrating their holy land. Despite this temporary Russian setback, the broader campaign against Circassian resistance continued.

Between 1840 and 1841, he burned his last villages and built Russian villages on top of them. The punitive strategy of Zass and other Caucasian generals alienated the population and caused discontent in St. Petersburg. In 1842, Zass was removed from service in the Caucasus and because of the quarrel in 1842 with superiors, including Pavel Grabbe, he was forced to leave the Caucasus forever, and ultimately to resign in 1848.

==== Hungarian Revolution of 1848 ====
Tsar Nicholas I of Russia, in March 1849, recruited a Russian army, composed of about 8,000 soldiers, to assist Franz Joseph against the unrest in Hungary. In 1849 Zass returned to service and took part in the campaign in Hungary, commanding the Vanguard of the 3rd Corps. Russia invaded Transylvania on 8 April 1849. But as they crossed the Southern Carpathian mountain passes (along the border of Transylvania and Wallachia), they were met by a large Hungarian revolutionary army led by Józef Bem, a Polish-born General. Zass participated in the battles of Weitzen and Debrecen.

Zass then again left the service in 1864.

==== Reservist in Caucasian Army ====
In recognition of his previous services, Emperor Alexander II ordered Zass to be enlisted in the service nominally in the Caucasian Army, and in 1877 he was promoted to the rank of general of cavalry.

=== Retirement ===
Emperor Alexander II, wishing to honor the military exploits of Zass, called him back into service and promoted him to general of cavalry, commanding him to be listed in the Caucasian Army with the right to live wherever he wanted. Zass died at the age of 86 in Šķēde Manor, Courland Governorate, Russian Empire (now Saldus Municipality, Latvia).

== Racist views ==
Zass considered Circassians to be subhumans inferior to the "European Race", particularly Germans and Russians. The only way to deal with the Circassians, in his opinion, was to scare them away "just like wild animals". He kept a box under his bed with his collection of severed Circassian body parts.

Zass advocated ruthless military methods predicated on this notion, including burning people alive, cutting off heads for enjoyment, burning populated villages to the ground, spreading epidemics on purpose, and mass rape of children.

== War crimes and genocidal actions ==
=== Methods of massacre of Circassians ===
Colonel Grigory Zass was a key figure in the Circassian genocide through ethnic cleansing, which included methods such as burning entire Circassian villages, and deliberately causing epidemics. It is estimated that 70% of the East Circassian population died in the process.

Zass believed that there was no need to try to negotiate with the Circassians. His reports regularly say the following – "the village was exterminated to the ground", "those who resisted together with the village were committed to fire and sword", "the inhabitants of the village perished."

Zass sent severed Circassian heads to his friends in Berlin who were professors and used them to study anatomy. The Decembrist Nikolai Ivanovich Lorer said that Zass cleaned and boiled the flesh off the heads after storing them under his bed in his tent. He also had Circassian heads outside of his tent impaled on lances on a hill. Circassian men's corpses were decapitated by Russian-Cossack women on the battlefield after the battles were over for the heads to be sent to Zass for collection.

Zass erected Circassian heads on poles outside of his tent and witnesses report seeing wind blow their beards. Russian soldiers and Cossacks were paid for sending Circassian heads to Zass. Besides cutting Circassian heads off and collecting them, Zass employed a deliberate strategy of annihilating Circassian en masse, burning entire Circassian villages with the people in them and encouraging the rape of Circassian women and children. Zass' forces referred to all Circassian elderly, children, women and men as "bandits", "plunderers" or "thieves" and the Russian empire's forces were commanded by officers who commanded political dissidents and criminals.

Zass worked with another German officer in the Russian army named Georg Andreas von Rosen during the genocide against the Circassians. Zass wrote letters to Rosen proudly admitting he ordered Cossacks to slaughter Circassian civilians.

=== Dismembering corpses ===
In addition, it was recorded that Zass dismembered Circassian corpses, hid them as ornaments and sent them abroad to be used as test subjects. Zass especially sent severed Circassian heads to professors in Berlin, who used them to study anatomy.

=== A Circassian Lament ===
An oral Circassian tradition describes the cultural memory of Zass as follows:

Zass with his thick mustache,
Is hanging the skulls of our men on sticks.
Our children in the wombs of mothers,
He stabs them out with a sword.
Children's bodies taken from the mother's womb,
They play with them on sticks.
The atrocities committed by the enemy,
Our new born generations should not forget.

— A Circassian elegy describing Zass

== Legacy ==
=== Controversy ===
Zass is depicted as the Devil or Satan in Circassian folklore.

In 2003, a monument to General Zass, as the founder of the city, was unveiled in the city of Armavir, Krasnodar Territory. The installation of the monument caused a sharply negative reaction of the Circassian society.

=== Establishments founded by him ===
On April 21, 1839, Zass founded the city of Armavir.

By 1843, he founded the villages of Urupskaya, Voznesenskaya, Chemlykskaya and Labinskaya. Zass's plans, however, extended even further. He developed a plan to strengthen the left bank of the Belaya River, to create powerful strongholds for the Russian army.

On August 26, 1904, the 1st Labinsky Regiment of the Kuban Cossack Army began to bear his name.
