= Giorgio Interiano =

Italian traveler and ethnographer

Giorgio Interiano (fl. 15th century) was a Genovese traveler, historian and ethnographer. His travelogue La vita: & sito de Zichi, chiamiti ciarcassi: historia notabile was among the first European accounts of the life and customs of the Circassian people.

== Life ==
Little is known about Interiano's personal life. He served as the governor of Corsica in 1496. He also lived in Naples and traveled throughout Asia before finally settling in Venice, where he became friends with many influential citizens of the city, whose connections would prove beneficial for his career as a travel writer.

The poet Angelo Poliziano (1454-1494) called Interiano, with whom he had worked for a number of years, "magnus naturalium rerum investigator," or "learned seeker into recondite matter."

== Notable work ==
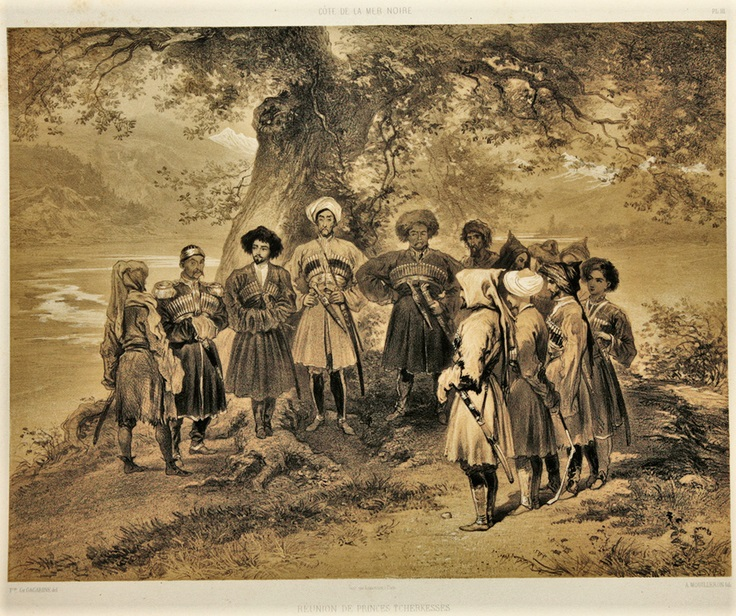
Early 19th century depiction of Circassian princes. Giorgio Interiano was the first Western traveler to document their customs.

Interiano was the author of one of the first Europe descriptions of Circassia, a book called La vita: & sito de Zichi, chiamiti ciarcassi: historia notabile. It was published by Aldus Manutius in Venice in 1502, though it probably describes events that occurred in the second half of the 14th century. The book was uncharacteristic of the works usually printed by Manutius, but Interiano's friendship with Jacopo Sannazaro, a famed poet of the time, may have influenced Manutius to accept and publish it anyway.

Interiano's account is considered to be more "learned" than other travelogues of the time, though it is still fits into the Orientalist idiom, the texts of which tend to focus on the exotic and savage character of all natives of Asia. For example, Interiano claimed that it was the custom of Circassian princes to hunt animals "and even people." Circassian priests, he wrote, were "ignorant, illiterate men performing the Greek ritual without any knowledge of the language," and "nobles never entered a church until they were sixty years of age, because, as they lived by rapine, they were deemed to desecrate the sacred edifices."

In spite of the more colorful aspects of the account, Interiano was still a dedicated ethnographer and detailed many important Circassian customs, including their distinct burial ritual of disemboweling men of high rank who had died and seating them outdoors on a tall pile of timber, a custom also described by Herodotus in his account of Scythian funerals.

The book was reprinted several times in Europe and in Russia. In 1830, M.V. Semenov published the text in the first volume of his Library of the foreign writers of Russia.

== Studies ==
Francesco Crifò / Wolfgang Schweickard, «Vita et Sito de Zychi» di Giorgio Interiano. Trascrizione e commento dell'editio princeps del 1502, Zeitschrift für romanische Philologie 130 (2014), 160-178.
