= Qaramirzey Massacre =

Russia's massacre against Circassians on 17 April 1825

- Laba Massacre
- Part of the Russo-Circassian War
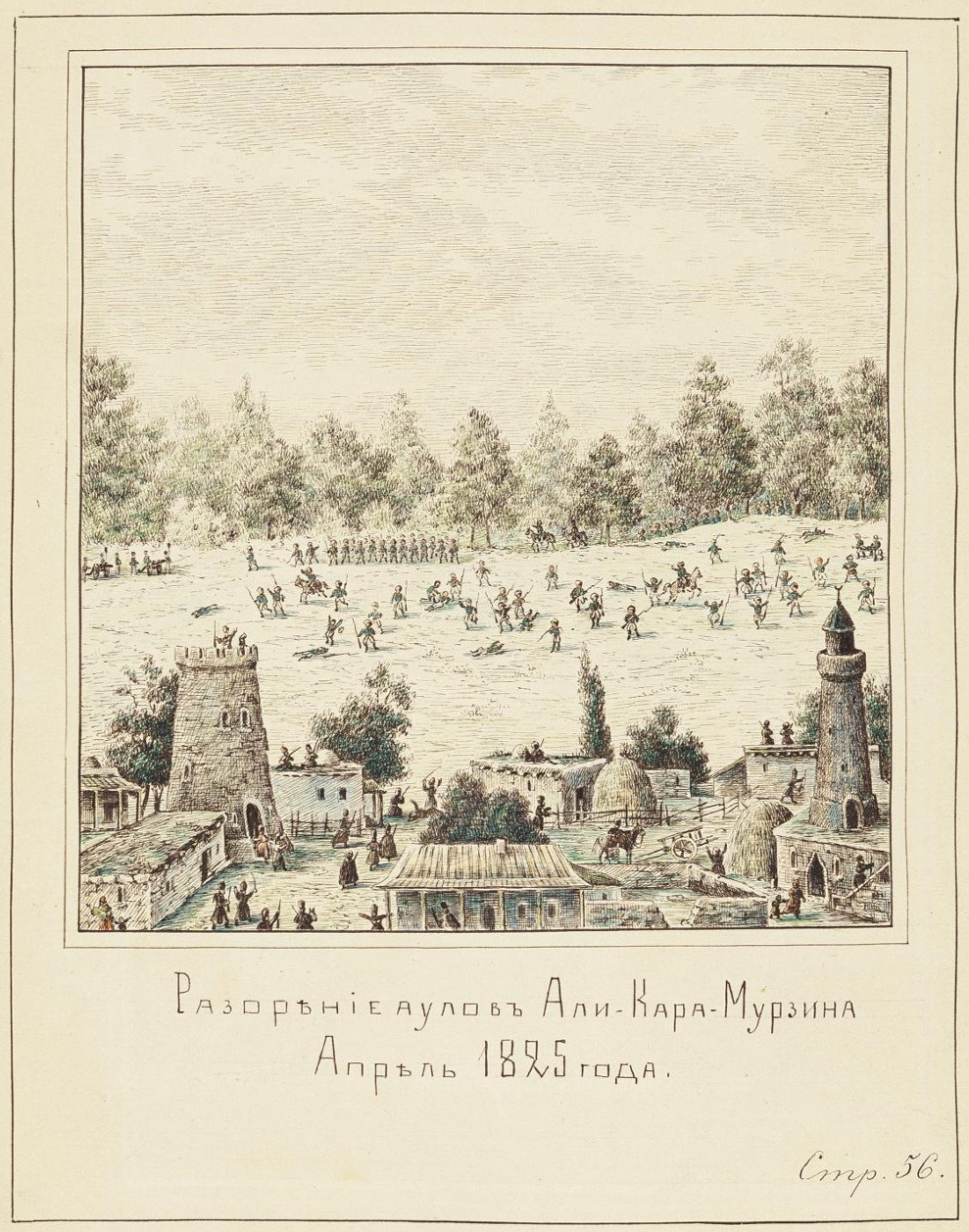
- Location: 44°05′42″N 40°57′28″E; Qaramirzey, Circassia
- Date: 17 April [O.S. 5 April] 1825
- Deaths: 1.700+ Qaramirza Aliy
- Victim: Circassians
- Perpetrators: (Russian Empire) Imperial Russian Army: (Russian Empire) Russian infantry units; Cossacks; Gen. Alexey Veliaminov; Col. Fedor Bekovich-Cherkasski; Col. Akim Makarovich Dadymov
- Motive: Russian imperialism

The Qaramirzey Massacre, or the Laba Massacre, was the destruction of the Circassian town/village of Qaramirzey by the Imperial Russian Army during the Russo-Circassian War. The Russian forces carried out looting, and arson.

The destruction of the town and the massacre of its inhabitants, although similar to what was done to other Circassian villages and towns, resonated strongly among the Circassians because it was the home of the renowned military commander Prince Qaramirza Aliy Misost and was 7–8 times larger (at least 200-250 households, 300 families) than an average Circassian village, making it a small town or a large village.

== Background ==
After Kabardia came fully under Russian control in 1822, Kabardian princes who refused to accept Russian rule migrated—mostly to Besleney territory in Western Circassia—along with their subjects and established new villages. These Kabardians were named the Hajret Kabardians, referring to the Hijrah. On April 1, 1825, General Veliaminov ordered to attack the villages of the Hajret Kabardians who settled in the Besleney lands. The main target of the campaign was Qaramirzey (or Karamirzahable), the village of Hajret Kabardian Prince Qaramirza Aliy. Aliy was from the Misost dynasty, took part in the wars against the Russians and was a famous commander with prestige among the Circassians. Qaramirzey was located near Mount Akhmet and was established on the upper bank of the Laba River, at an elevation that was difficult to access.

Veliaminov planned a secret and rapid attack to catch the townspeople unprepared. On the night of April 1, the Russian armies gathered at the Prochni Okop fortress and started the campaign. 3 infantry battalions crossed the Kuban River with 18 cannons and Cossack cavalry regiments. Circassian-origin Russian Colonel Bekovich's army crossed the Laba River, they spotted a herd of horses belonging to the Hajret Kabardians. The herder, who tried to drive the herd away, was captured. He was beaten during interrogation and admitted that the town was located 22 kilometers away.

In order not to be noticed by the Beseney villages on the way, they crossed rough roads at night under the guidance of the herder. They passed through difficult terrain and reached the town near the evening of April 4. Bekovich's army had arrived in the town before the infantry support from Veliaminov had yet reached. According to the Russian report, Bekovich's army consisted of 2 regiments, a total of 350 Cossack soldiers.

According to the writing of the Russian military historian Vasily Potto, if Bekovich retreated, he would encounter the Besleneys, if he tried to return quickly from the pass, he would suffer losses, and since there was a village in front of them that was awakening, he had to attack the town. According to the Caucasian historian V. H. Kazharov, this writing of Potto is a justification attempt.

At the midnight, a Besleney cavalryman named Krimzheriy Dokhushoqo, who was serving in Veliaminov's army, approached Qaramirzey, his face covered to avoid recognition. He knocked on Aliy's window and said he needed to speak with him. Aliy went outside, and Dokhushoqo told him that despite he is serving to Russian army, he felt pity for the townspeople and that the Russians would attack either today or tomorrow. After the Dokhushoqo left the town, Qaramirza gathered the town council. During the meeting, Aliy acknowledged the warnings he had received multiple times in the past, all of which had turned out to be false. The town leaders reasoned that in order for the Russians to reach Qaramirzey, they would have to pass through Besleney villages, and if they did, they would likely attack the Besleney villages first, allowing them to be alerted in advance. Qaramirzey said that if an attack occurred and he died, he instruckted everyone to tell others that Dokhushoqo had warned them. Consequently, they decided not to abandon the town. Despite the conclusion, Kabardians were worried and stayed awake through the night. However, when no attack came, they fell asleep at dawn.

Dokhushoqo returned to Veliaminov's army and reported that the Kabardians had learned of the attack and left the town, and that there was nothing left to attack. General Veliaminov was skeptical of his report. Another Besleney, Ali Shagur (Shavogur in some sources), who was a guide to Veliaminov's army, told Veliaminov that Dokhushoqo was a traitor and a liar, and that he would go to the town and find out the truth. When Ali Shagur returned and reported that the townspeople were in their place, Dokhushoqo was arrested and beheaded. Veliaminov ordered Bekovich to surround the town from all corners until reinforcements arrived, and then Bekovich's army deployed inside the pine forest around the town (except for the cliff leading to the river).

== The Massacre ==
Oral sources say that after artillery fire was opened on the town from Akhmet Mountain, the Russian army launched the attack. When the attack began at dawn, the Cossacks began to break into houses, loot and kill any Circassians they saw.

Colonel Akim Makarovich Dadymov, of Ossetian descent, who personally knew Qaramirza Aliy from the battles, moved to the other end of the town with the Cossacks under his command. Qaramirza Aliy, who had just woken up and was partially dressed, stepped out into his courtyard and fired at Dadymov, but missed. Dadymov then shot Aliy in the lower part of his right eye with his pistol, killing him. As the buildings in the town were set on fire, people were emerging from the burning houses, only to be killed as they did so. As people sought shelter behind the warriors, large groups of targets quickly formed for the Russian soldiers.

Shogen Shumaho, a famous Kabardian noble warrior, tied his baby Ismail to his gilded rifle to prevent it from falling into the hands of the Russians and left him from the cliff, and was killed while trying to protect his daughter Gushehurai. Gushehurai was bayoneted to death by Cossacks. Shumaho's pregnant wife burned to death in the fires, having taken the loot with her to prevent it from falling into the hands of the Russians. 18 prominent princes and about 50 famous Circassian warriors has been killed in the massacre. During the 2-hours long massacre, 570 Circassians were directly killed, 100 bodies were found of those who drowned while trying to cross the Laba River after jumping off the cliff, and over 1,000 Circassians died due to the fires that were set by the Russian army. 665 horses, 530 cattle, 2,300 sheep, large amounts of money, and weapons were looted.

Bekovich suffered no casualties according to the Russian report. The Russians captured 139 survivors and left the town, returning to Prochni Okop on April 10. The male prisoners were forced to work on the construction of the fortresses, while the women and children were placed in Cossack villages. It was reported that an 8-year-old girl, who had a seizure from fear, died the morning after being taken prisoner.

According to the Russian report, General Veliaminov and his infantry reached Akhmet Mountain after the massacre. Kazharov considers Veliaminov's claim of not participating in the attack on the town to be "a fairy tale." He emphasizes that even if the element of surprise was on the Russian side, the Kabardian princes would not have shown weak resistance, noting that many people in the town were warriors, nobles, or princes. Throughout the Caucasian War, some Russian military reports observed that the number of troops and casualties were reported as lower than they actually were, while the successes were highlighted and exaggerated.

According to Kazharov, General Yermolov's reporting of the attack on civilians to the government would have diminished the value of the victory. Therefore, the deliberate underreporting of the number of troops under Bekovich’s command and presenting the attack as an entirely independent action was crafted to strengthen the narrative of heroism and protect the command from accusations of excessive violence.

== Aftermath ==
A few hours after the massacre, Ajdjeriyiqo Kushuk and Jembulat Qeytuqo from the vicinity of Qaramirzey came to the destroyed town with 300 warriors, but Bekovich had passed the pass and taken himself to safety. Later, Besleneys, Kabardians and Abazas from the surrounding villages came and buried the funerals of more than 1,000 people in the burned town. Three days after the massacre, the Circassians found Shozhen Shumakho’s baby Ismail by coincidence. Ismail was unconscious and with Shumakho’s gilded rifle in the bushes by the cliff. After the Russo-Circassian War, Ismail settled in the village of Ulyap. The Circassians intensified their attacks and resistance efforts in retaliation for the massacre.

Qaramirza's two wives, Yelmiskhan and Haniy Pusughay (Slastamina in Russian sources), were seized as booty and Princess Haniy was given to prince Astemirov of Little Kabarda as a concubine, while Yelmiskhan was sent back to his older brother, prince Mansur Yedizh of Nogai. Prince Astemirov was also the chief of police of the Little Kabarda.

Aliy's nephews, Mohammad Asha Hatokhshoqo and Ajdjeriyiqo Kushuk Bechmirza, decided to kill Ali Shagur and Astemirov, who were helped the Russians, for "revenge of the people". Prince Muhammad Asha learned from a young Nogai informant, who knew Shagur personally, where Shagur would pass through. He aimed his rifle at the village entrance path throughout the night. Then, as Ali Shagur—dressed in a white Cherkesska, singing, and riding a white horse—was leaving the village, Muhammad intercepted him. After a brief exchange, Shagur fired at Muhammad but missed. Then Muhammad shot and killed Shagur with his Yerzhib model rifle. Following princely customs, he placed Shagur's weapons beside his body, covered him, and released his horse into the surroundings.

Dadymov, who killed Qaramirza Aliy, was severely wounded by the warriors of Ajdjeriyiqo during a Circassian attack that followed by the destruction of the village of the Abzakh leader Hajji Tlam on August 18, 1825, by a detachment under the command of Bekovich-Cherkassky, ordered by General Veliaminov. Dadymov died the next day from his injuries.

Prince Ajdjeriyiqo Kushuk rode 400 kilometers and arrived in Lesser Kabarda, in the village of Prince Astemirov. He stole Astemirov's herd of horses. This was an act which in Circassian tradition symbolized a duel challenge. Upon being informed by a herdsman, Astemirov took a few guards and began to pursue Ajdjeriyiqo. Once he realized that Ajdjeriyiqo's true intention was not theft but a challenge to duel, he quickly recovered the herd. The prince’s warriors withdrew. Astemirov and Ajdjeriyiqo distanced themselves before charging toward each other on horseback. Both fired their rifles at the same time, but each missed. Ajdjeriyiqo suddenly maneuvered his horse, drew his pistol, and killed Astemirov with his first shot. According to oral sources, he killed him with a sword instead. These sources also claim that Ajdjeriyiqo ordered Astemirov’s body to be buried and took Qaramirza’s widowed wife Haniy back to Western Circassia.

According to Russian sources, Haniy was forcibly married to Bekovich in 1826. After the death of Bekovich without children in 1833, Haniy's uncle Prince Ismail Qasey, said Haniy to marry a Chemguy prince named Jembulat Aytuqo. However, in 1834, Prince Hatokhshoqo Hatokhshoqo proposed and they were engaged in exchange for 500 rubles and 6 serfs. Upon hearing this, Ismail Qasey told Haniy not to marry without his permission. Hatokhshoqo exaggerated the situation, prompting his superiors to order that the marriage not proceed and that Haniy be sent to her uncle if she did not agree. The marriage was canceled, though Haniy is known to have been married by 1840.

The news of the destruction of the town of Qaramirzey spread quickly among the Circassians and many laments were sung about it. A fragment from a Laba lament:

When we look at the Laba, cursed by God,

The bloody mist is rising like fog.

When we look down upon the old Laba,

The bodies of children drift along its wide waters.

Russian General Yermolov praised Bekovich’s massacre as a bold move. on September 29, 1825, Yermolov proposed to Tsar Alexander I that he be awarded the Order of St. George, 4th class. The Tsar rejected the proposal with the following words:

“If the orders of Regimental Commander Prince Bekovich concerning the initial assault on the enemy village and its capture were carried out without loss, on the other hand, he forfeits the right to be rewarded, as the wisely initiated operation ended with the complete destruction of more than 300 families, the majority of whom were women and innocent children…”

Bekovich received the medal for repelling two Circassian attacks in the same year.
