= Muhammad Asha Hatokhshoqo =

Circassian prince and commander

Muhammad Hatokhshoqo
- ХьэтIохъущокъуэ Мыхьэмэт
- Born: c. 1810; Kabardia (East Circassia)
- Died: 1846; Urup River, Besleney, Circassia
- Children: Ashemez
- Relatives: Ajdjeriyiqo Kushuk; Karamirza Aliy; Temirbolet Misost; Misost Bematuqo
- Military career
- Allegiance: Kabardia (Russian Empire) Russia (formerly); Circassia
- Service years: 1825; 1828–1846
- Nickname: The Crippled-Armed
- Conflicts: Russo-Circassian War

Muhammad Asha Hatokhshoqo (Kabardian: ХьэтIохъущокъуэ Мыхьэмэт Iэшэ, Russian: Мухаммад-Аша Атажукин, Мухаммад Колчерукий) or Muhammad the Crippled-Armed, was a Circassian commander and prince. He participated in the Russo-Circassian War. Muhammad was one of the Kabardians who migrated to Western Circassia. Over time, he became known as a famous leader among the Circassians.

There were at least three other people named Muhammad Hatokhshoqo in the records of his time.

== Biography ==
=== Name ===
Muhammad's surname was Hatokhshoqo and his nickname was Asha (Iэшэ, ӏащэ). This nickname means crippled armed in Circassian and he received it because his right arm was noticeably shorter than his left arm because of a wound he received in battle in the 1834.

=== Family ===
Muhammad was born in Kabardia into the princely Hatokhshoqo family. His father Temirbolet (son of Misost Bematiqo), had served in the Russian army, and the family was regarded by the Russians as peaceful Kabardians. As a child, Temirbolet was given as a hostage to Russia, where he received his education. He served in the Russo-Turkish War of 1787–1792. As a captain, he helped suppress the uprisings by Kabardians against Russian rule, served on the Kabardian Court until it was dissolved, and opposed sending his children to be educated in Russia.

Muhammad was the maternal nephew of the famous Hajret Kabardian prince Karamirza Aliy Misost. He was also the maternal cousin of Ajdjeriyiqo Kushuk Bechmirza. His auntie Sultanim was the wife of Jankhot Qushuq, the last grand prince of Kabarda. From this marriage, Jankhot had a son, Jembulat, who took part in the Circassian assault on the Soldatskaya fortress and was killed in Nalchik in an attack against Russian forces in October of the same year.

=== Russo-Circassian War ===
Among the prominent Hajret Kabardian princes of the 1820s were Karamirza Aliy, Talhosten Hatokhshoqo, Ismail Qasey, Beslanuqo Aslan-Giray Hamirza, Mirzabek Hamirza and Ajdjeriyiqo Kushuk. It was estimated that the Hajret Kabardians alone could field a maximum of 2,000 cavalries. The main area where the battles took place during this period extended from the mouth of the Laba River to the Kamenny Most (Stone Bridge) region, located above the Kuban River. During this period, the regions east of the Kuban River (around the Urup, Zelenchuk, and Laba rivers) became a base of operations for Circassian warriors conducting raids against the Russians. The Hajret Kabardians, joining forces with the Chemguy, Besleney, and Abzakh tribes, became one of the strongest elements of the Circassian resistance.

In 1825, after the death of his father, Muhammad left Kabardia and migraed to Western Circassia in the same year, joining other princes who had become part of the Circassian resistance in Western Circassia. By this time, Kabardia had come fully under Russian control after the suppression of the last major uprising in 1825. According to oral sources, Muhammad ambushed and killed a Circassian named Shagur who helped the Russians in the Karamirzey Massacre, the massacre resulted in killing of his uncle Karamirza Aliy and his villagers. After some time for some reason, he returned to Kabardia. When he returned he was arrested for joining the enemy, but he was laterforgived because he was still a child. As an intelligent politician, he took part in the Kabardian People's Council.

In March 1828, Muhammad reestablished contact with the Hajret Kabardian princes, a Russian stagecoach 8 kilometers from Pavlovskaya Station was looted by a group of 8 men, mostly Hajret Kabardians including Muhammad. After an investigation he was arrested and imprisoned. When he was released from prison with the guarantee of the Kabardian princes, he migrated permanently to Western Circassia. His brother Kushuk remained loyal to Russian rule in Kabardia. During the Russo-Turkish War of 1828–1829, Muhammad frequently took part in Circassian attacks on Russian lines.

F. F. Tornau, described the period when Grigory Zass was promoted to Commander-in-Chief of the Kuban Military Line in 1834, stated the following:

...their most capable leaders were killed by us during the clashes, and many surrendered; however, the most dangerous ones stubbornly continued their bloody activities. Among them, Hajji Janseid, Prince Aslan-Giray Hamirza, and Muhammad Hatokhshoqo stood out for their skill and extraordinary luck. With every offensive the General (Zass) launched, he was met with an equally successful counterattack from them.

Muhammed Asha reached his fame in the 1830s and 1840s, rising to the position of leader of the Hajret Kabardians. He is recorded as being a skilled poet and also a player of the shichepshin (Circassian violin). Continuing the old tradition of Circassian and Abkhaz nobility, he organized month-long festivals each year. These events featured competitions in horseback riding, acrobatics, poetry, music, dance, and theater.

He was mentioned in a song about Ajdjeriyiqo Kushuk:

When the campaign horsemen mount their horses,

They send the messenger (to call Muhammad to the campaign) after them.

When the (enemy) cavalry fall behind you,

He brings (those enemies) to us as prisoners,

If you ask who this cavalry is,

He is Hatokhshoqo Muhammad Asha!

Despite his arm, he had a special rifle adapted to his short hand, and according to records, he was highly successful in marksmanship, but couldn't cut flesh with his sword enough to split it in two. In 1835, Muhammad went to Istanbul to have his crippled arm treated. During his stay in the spring and summer, he also took an interest in social problems and held meetings with Ottoman officials. In the petition submitted to Sultan Mahmud II on April 28, 1835, Muhammed requested that 1,000 Circassian households be settled on Ottoman territory to protect them from Russian attacks and that the state provide assistance to them. Muhammad was recognized by the Ottoman government as the leader of the Hajret Kabardians and a representative of Circassia. Additionally, he received the title of "Bey" from the Sultan, and instructions were given to meet the needs of the migrants.

According to an Ottoman document dated July 19, 1835, 400 Circassian households arrived in small groups at the port of Samsun and were settled in Çorum, Amasya and Samsun. Despite the status and wealth promised to Muhammad by the Ottomans, he returned to Circassia after his request was fulfilled and the Circassian families were settled in the Ottoman Empire. In 1843, his unit was defeated by Colonel Krugovski at Bekeshevskiy.

=== Death ===
There are two different versions about Muhammad's death. According to Baron von Karl Fyodorovich Stal, in 1846, Muhammad was advancing along the line to join a campaign with his companions. While passing through the land of Besleney prince Adilgirey Konoko, who had a long-standing blood feud with him, Prince Adilgirey charged toward Muhammed, with his nobles and the two princes met near the Urup River. Adilgirey's son charged forward to Muhammad to take revenge for the blood feud. When Muhammad saw that his opponent was a child, he hesitated to fire. His companion Silpay raised his weapon to shoot but Muhammad stopped Silpay, saying that blood should not be mixed with milk, meaning that the innocent should be separated from the enemy.

At this moment, Adilgirey's son shot at Mohammad. Immediately afterwards both sides charged each other and 14 people, including Prince Adilgirey and his son, were killed in the clash. The princes' bodies were carried to Adilgirey's village and brought to the prince's house before being buried and placed in the corner of honor in the guest room. Seeing the bodies of her husband and son, Adilgirey's wife began to mourn. When she saw the body of Prince Mohammed, she ordered to placed the body in the corner of honor.

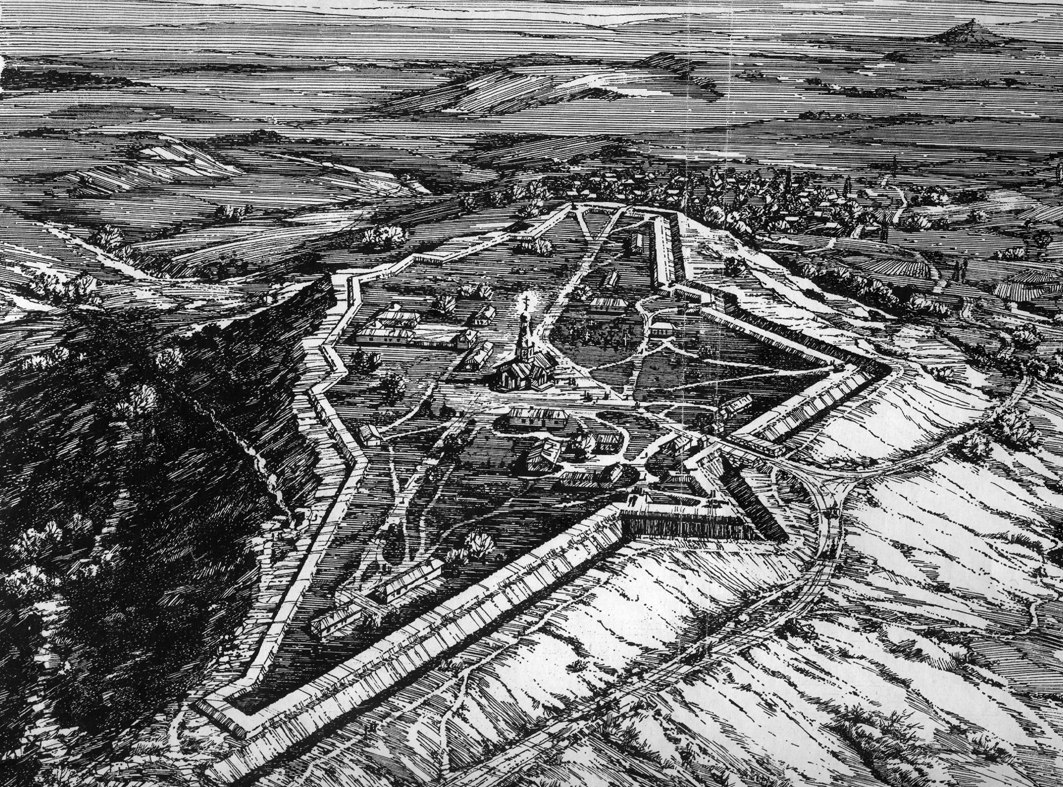
Stavropol Fortress

According to Vasily Potto, in 1846, Muhammad infiltrated Stavropol Fortress with 13 warriors. When the fortress was besieged by the Russian army, they organized to break the siege. Muhammad and a few others managed to break through from the fortress entrance, but returned to rescue those left inside. They attempted to break the siege three times, and during these attempts, Muhammad and 3-4 of his companions were killed. One person, who could neither be captured nor killed, escaped.

The fate of Muhammad's family after his death remained largely unknown, aside from a few folk legends. Muhammad's only child, Ashemez, was child when Muhammad was killed. As the Russian line advanced during the war, the Hajret Kabardian villages were continuously pushed further inland toward Abzakh lands, and for this reason Muhammad spent his final years settled in Abzakh territory. According to a legend among the Circassians in Turkey, when the Abzakhs were exiled to the Ottoman Empire during the Circassian genocide, they took Muhammad’s son Ashemez with them. A group of Circassians who adhered to their traditions came together and chose Ashemez as their prince which descendant of a renowned prince. A special princely house was built for Ashemez, and guards were stationed there. In case of a dispute or a decision to be made, he would consult a council of 40 elders and accept their judgment if he deemed it appropriate. Ashemez would announce his decision with the formal words: "I, Ashemez, son of Hatokhshoqo Muhammad, prince of princes, by the grace of God, decide on behalf of all Circassians in accordance with Adyghe Khabze and the opinions of our esteemed elders..." According to one interpretation, due to the chaotic situation of the Circassians in the Ottoman Empire, the elders, who saw the need for an authority system, used Muhammad’s son, a descendant of a famous prince, as a means of establishing authority. When Ashemez died at a young age under unknown circumstances, Muhammad’s lineage came to an end.

== Legacy ==
In the national memory of the Circassians, Muhammad Asha emerged as an ideal hero. According to contemporary historians, he was seen by the Circassians as a "symbol of courage and heroism." Even while he was alive, songs about him were sung, but these songs have not survived to the present day.
