= Qaramirza Aliy =

Circassian military commander

Prince Qaramirza Aliy Misost
- Къэрэмырзэ Алий Мысост
- Seal of Qaramirza Aliy, 1820

Personal details
- Born: 18th c. Kabardia (Eastern Circassia)
- Died: 17 April [O.S. 5 April] 1825 Qaramirzey, Besleney, Circassia
- Spouse(s): Yelmiskhan; Haniy
- House: House of Misost; Qaramirza

Military service
- Allegiance: Kabardia (East Circassia); Circassian Confederation
- Battles/wars: Russo-Circassian War; Qaramirzey Massacre †

Qaramirza Aliy Misost (Kabardian: Мысост Къэрэмырзэ Алий, Russian: Али Карамурзина), was a Circassian commander and prince who partook in the Russo-Circassian War.

== Biography ==
=== Family ===
Aliy belonged to the Qaramirza family of the princely house of Misost in Kabardia. One of her sisters was the wife of the last Kabardian Grand Prince, Jankhot Qushuq. Her nephew Jembulat from this sister was killed by the Russians during a Circassian raid on Nalchik. Another sister of Aliy was the mother of the famous Hajret Kabardian prince Ajdjeriyiqo Kushuk. Another sister was the mother of the famous Hajret Kabardian prince Muhammad Asha.

Yelmiskhan, the sister of Nogai prince Yedizh, and Haniy, the niece of Hajret Kabardian prince Ismail Qasey, both entered into political marriages with Aliy.

Tamga of Qaramirza family

=== Russo-Circassian War ===
In 1807, with the death of two of Kabardia's most influential figures; Adilgirey Hatokhshoqo and the religious leader Efendi Ishak due to an epidemic, figures such as Qasbolet Qilichuqo, Qaramirza Aliy, and Aslanbech Beslan began to rise to prominence. His name first appeared in Russian records in 1809, listed among the Kabardian princes who were "always hostile to the Russian side."

During the Russo-Turkish War (1806–1812), he was among the princes who promised to support the anti-Russian Georgian prince Alexander. In a meeting attended by all the princes and nobles in Kabardia, they decided to retreat to the mountains and begin operations against Russia. The Ottoman ambassador brought by Aliy was also present at the meeting.

According to a Russian report from 1820, Aliy's village was located north of the Kuma River and consisted of 60 households. In 1822, together with his subjects, he established the village of Qaramirzey in the lands of the Besleney Circassians, beyond Mount Akhmet and at the source of the Laba River, in a hard-to-reach mountain pass (near present-day Akhmetovskaya). Within a short time, many warrior nobles and princes, along with their subjects, settled in Qaramirzey. As a result, the village's population grew to at least 200–250 households. Qaramirza Aliy became one of the most prominent and influential leaders of the Hajret Kabardians.

In the summer of 1823, Russian General Veliaminov launched a campaign into Circassia with a detachment of approximately 1,400 infantry, artillery, and Cossack cavalry. The objective of the campaign was to punish the Nogai villages for providing military support to Jembulat Boletoqo. During this time, Qaramirza Aliy and other Circassian leaders quickly assembled an army of 1,500 men, bringing together the Hajret Kabardians, the Besleney, the Bashilbey Abaza, and a dozen Abzakh warriors in response to the Russian advance.

While Veliaminov's troops crossing the Lesser Zelenchuk River, the Circassians continued to follow them. Some Circassian units repeatedly ambushed the Russians, but Veliaminov's unit continued to advance, taking up defensive positions in the wide valley. The Circassians began their attack repeatedly charged the Russian positions on the hills, dispersed the Navaginsky Infantry Regiment and approached Veliaminov, but each time they withdrew with heavy losses.

The Russians managed to repel the Circassian attacks with artillery fire and snipers. As a result of the battle, the Circassians suffered heavy losses, and Qaramirza Aliy was wounded.

After the defeat at Lesser Zelenchuk, discussions took place throughout August to compensate for the losses by entering Kabardia and bringing the Kabardians under Russian rule to Western Circassia. Qaramirza Aliy and Ismail Qasey were the most persistent advocates of this plan but no decision could be made due to frequent oppositions.

=== Death ===
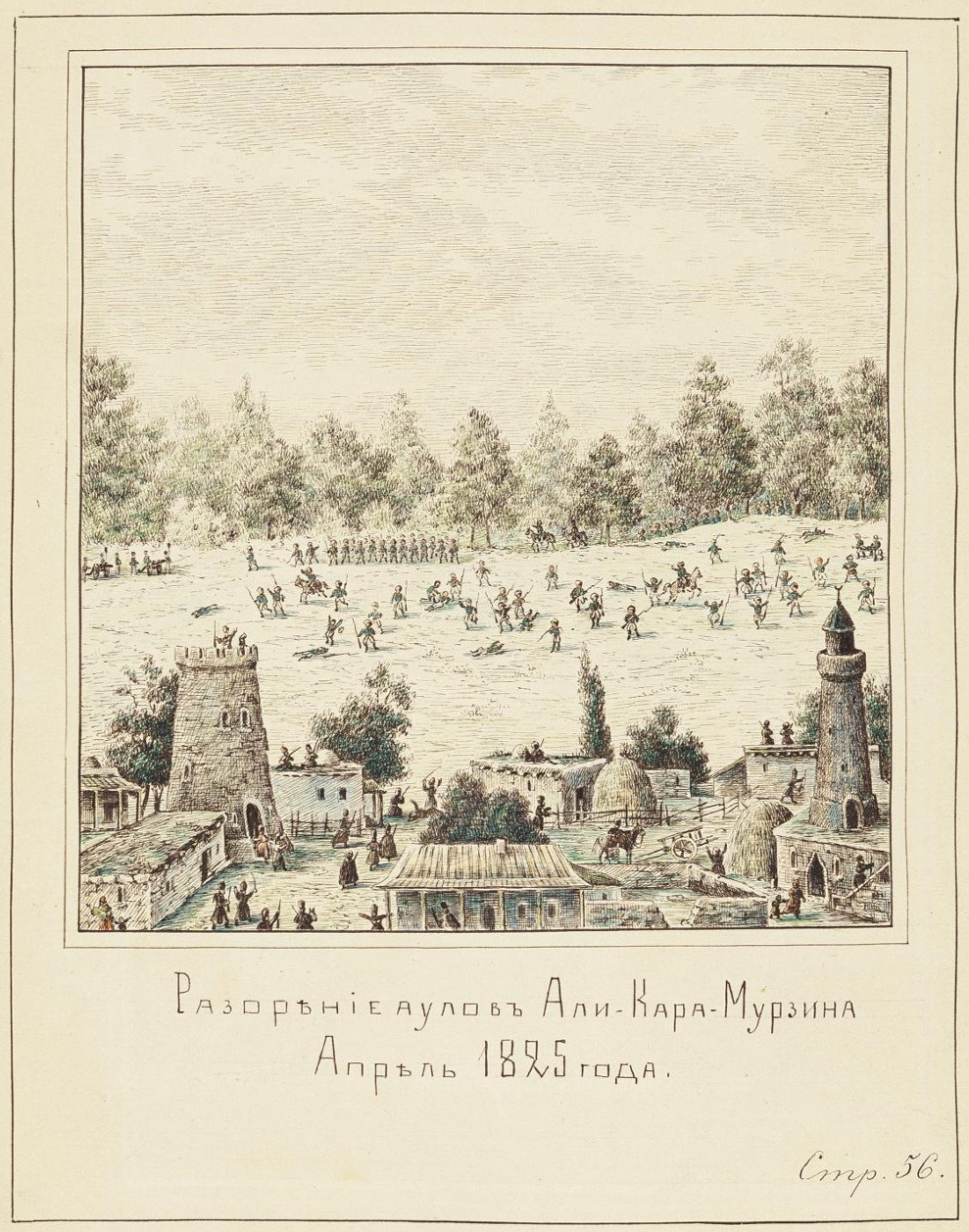
Destruction of the village of Karamirza Aliy by Geyevskiy E. P.

The Hajret Kabardians posed a great threat to Russia's Kuban Military Line, and made them one of the first targets. General Veliaminov gave the order to attack the Hajret Kabardian villages on April 1, 1825, determined Qaramirzey as the main target of the campaign.

A Russian army under the command of Bekovich questioned a herder they had captured and took advantage of his guidance, and on the night of April 4–5, they passed near the Besleney villages and reached Qaramirzey.

At dawn, The Cossacks began killing the villagers, looting and burning the houses. Ossetian origin Russian Colonel Akim Makarovich Dadymov, who knew Aliy from the battles, quickly moved to the other side of the village along with his Cossack troops. Just awakened, Qaramirza Aliy fired his rifle at Dadymov from his courtyard but missed. Dadymov then fired his pistol and killed Aliy with a shot below his right eye.

During the two-hour massacre, the village of Qaramirzey was destroyed, and a small number of survivors including Qaramirza Aliy's two wives Haniy and Yelmiskhan, were taken captive. Haniy was later given as a gift to Astemirov, the police chief of Little Kabarda. Astemirov was killed in a duel by Ajdjeriyiqo Kushuk as revenge for Qaramirzey. Another Circassian who helped the Russians in the massacre, Shagur, was killed by Muhammad Asha.

== Legacy ==
The killing of Prince Qaramirza Aliy, an important and famous commander, with the destruction of his village left a deep cultural mark among the Circassians, and many laments were sung about the event. Some of these laments have survived to the present day.
