= Amirkhan Kamizovich Shomakhov =

Soviet play writer (1910–1988)

- Born: 10 October [O.S. 27 September] 1910; Kabardian: Къаншыуей, Tersky District Russian Empire
- Died: 13 July 1988 (aged 77); Nalchik, Kabardino-Balkaria, RSFSR, Union of Soviet Socialist Republics
- Resting place: Nalchik, Volny Aul Cemetery
- Occupations: Writer, lyricist, playwright
- Years active: 1930–1985
- Known for: Lyrics for Children
- Spouse: Lyolya Kupova (m. 1913–1999)
- Children: Tamara Shomakhova, Sultan Shomakhov
- Parent(s): Kamiza Shomakhov, Gushaney Maksidova

Amirkhan Kamizovich Shomakhov (Russian: Амирхáн Ками́зович Шомáхов; Kabardian: Щомахуэ Амырхъан Къамызэ и къуэр; 10 October [O.S. 27 September] 1910 − 13 July 1988) was a Soviet Kabardian lyrics, prose, and play writer, primarily known as one of the founders of the Kabardian children's literature. People's Poet of the Kabarda-Balkar ASSR (1977). Member of the Union of Soviet Writers since 1949. Member of the CPSU since 1938.

== Biography ==
Amirkhan Shomakhov was born in the village of Kanshuei of the Terskaya oblast of the Russian Empire (in what is now Nizhnii Kurp of the Tersky District of the Kabardino-Balkar Republic, Russian Federation).

=== Education ===
In his early childhood Shomakhov studied at a madrasa in his native village. After the October Revolution he finished primary school and entered a secondary educational institution called The Lenin's Campus in the city of Nalchik. In 1933 he graduated from the Northern Caucasus Pedagogical Institute in Ordzhonikidze (Vladikavkaz, North Ossetia-Alania). In 1955 he also finished the Higher Party School of the Central Committee of the CPSU.

=== Employment ===
During his lifetime Amirkhan Shomakhov worked as lecturer, editor, and official in governmental and civic institutions.

- 1933-1936 Nalchik Pedagogical College (teacher, deputy principal, principal)
- 1935-1936 Military service
- 1938-1940 Republican newspaper (editor-in-chief)
- 1941-1941 CPSU committee of the Baksansky District, KBR (chairman)
- 1941-1943 People's Commissariat of Education of KBR (comissar)
- 1943-1945 Republican newspaper, KBR (editor-in-chief)
- 1945-1946 CPSU committee of the Baksansky District, KBR (chairman)
- 1947-1949 Kabardian Publishing House (director)
- 1949-1952 Ministry of Education of KBR (minister)
- 1952-1955 All-Union Znanie Society, KBR (executive secretary)
- 1955-1957 Republican newspaper, KBR (vice editor-in-chief)
- 1957-1960 Literary magazine «Oshkhamahue», KBR (editor-in-chief)
- 1965-1970 Republican Union of Writers, KBR (executive secretary)

== Literary works ==
=== Trial of the pen ===
For the first time Shomakhov's lyrics saw the light of the day in 1933 (in a literary collection «First Step»).

=== Prose ===
Shomakhov is the author of novels Kolkhoz Under Fire (1958) and Dawn Over the Terek (1968; Russian translation, 1972). The former tells about the events of the war years, and the latter concerns the Civil War and the first years of Soviet power in the Kabardian Republic. He also wrote a novel titled Horsemen on the Peaks (1970), about formation of the working class in Kabardino-Balkaria.

=== Poetry for Children ===
Amirkhan Shomakhov was truly a dedicated kids writer. A Moscow publishing house «Detskaya Literatura» in 1969 highly appraised his poem «Scouts». In 1970 he was nominated for the State award named after N. Krupskaya. His books have been translated into many of the languages of the peoples of the Soviet Union. Here is an abstract from his poemette translated to English by Margaret Wettlin:

POOR LITTLE MUKHADIN Kabardian: МУХЬЭДИН КЪЫЩЫЩIАР

Always something bad befalls me,
I'm always on the outs with luck,
Every day the teacher calls me
To the board, and there I'm stuck.

Yesterday I couldn't tell her
Where our country gets its tea,
I lost my pen, I lost my speller —
What a life for such as me!

== Family ==
- Father: Kamiza Shomakhov
  Kabardian: Щомахуэ Къамызэ.
- Mother: Maksidova Guashane
  Kabardian: Махъсыд Гуащэнэ Тепсорыкъуэ и пхъур.
- Wife: Lyolya Kupova
  Kabardian: Куп Лёлэ Мац и пхъур
  14 May [O.S. 1 May] 1913 − 26 January 1999.
- Amirkhan and Lyolya had 2 children: the daughter, Tamara and the son, Sultan.

== Honours and awards ==
=== Titles of honor ===
- Honored Man of Art of Kabardino-Balkaria (1949).
- People's Poet of Kabardino-Balkaria (1977).

=== Decorations ===
- Medal "For the Defence of the Caucasus" (1944).
- Medal "For Valiant Labour in the Great Patriotic War 1941–1945" (1945).
- Order of the Badge of Honour (1957).
- Order of the Badge of Honour (1970).
- Medal "In Commemoration of the 100th Anniversary of the Birth of Vladimir Ilyich Lenin" (1970).
- Medal "Thirty Years of Victory in the Great Patriotic War 1941–1945" (1976).

== Memory ==
- The City Council of Nalchik, on the occasion of the 100th anniversary of Amirkhan Shomakhov's birth, disposed to erect a commemorative plaque on the facade of the poet's residence house.

== Bibliography ==
- The Great Soviet Encyclopedia / ed. Marron Waxman. - 3-rd Edition. - New York : Mac-Millan, Inc., 1970—1979;
- Kozhevnikov, V., Nikolaeva P., Literary Encyclopedic Dictionary, Soviet Encyclopedia, Moscow, 1987;
- Kodzokova, L.R., Kabardian Poetry for Children of the Present Period: Topics and Poetics // Current Problems of the Humanitarian and Natural sciences. Moscow. – 2017. – No. 7; (Russian: Кодзокова, Л.Р., Кабардинская детская поэзия на современном этапе: тематика и поэтика // Актуальные проблемы гуманитарных и естественных наук. Москва. – 2017. – № 7)
- Writers of Kabardino-Balkaria (XIXc. - end of 80-s of XXc.). Bibliographic Dictionary / ed. Khazhkhozheva, R.H., Nalchik: El-Fa, 2003; (Russian: Писатели Кабардино-Балкарии XIX – конец 80-х гг ХХ в. Библиографический словарь / гл. ред. Р. Х . Хашхожева. Нальчик: Эль-фа. – 2003);
- Maksidova, A.A., Maksidovs' Genealogical Line, in Genealogy of the North Caucasus. No. 10. – Nalchik, 2004; (Russian: Максидова, А.А. Генеалогия рода Максидовых // Генеалогия Северного Кавказа. – Нальчик : Северо-Кавказское генеалогическое общество. – 2004. – № 10).
