= Hajji Janseid =

Circassian noble and commander

Hajji Jansit Wuvzhuqo
- Native name: Жансит Увжыкъуэ
- Born: c. 1760s Kabardia
- Died: 1843 Circassia
- Allegiance: Kabardia (East Circassia); Circassian Confederation
- Service years: c. 1770s-1843
- Conflicts: Russo-Circassian War
- Children: At least 1 male child

Hajji Janseid (Russian: Хаджи Джансеид) or Jansit Wuvzhuqo (Kabardian: Жансит Увжыкъуэ, Russian: Увжуко Жанситов), was a Circassian commander and nobleman who took part in the Russo-Circassian War. Most of the information about Janseid comes from a Russian officer Fedor Fedorovich Tornau, who was taken hostage by the Circassians between 1836 and 1838. In James Bell's book, he is mentioned as Hadji Jansit-okû. His name was Wuvzhuqo and surname Jansit.

== Biography ==
He was born in Kabardia in the 1760s. He was a nobleman loyal to Prince Naf Andemiriqo of the Bechmirza dynasty. He took part in campaigns against the Russians from the 1770s. After the Kabardian subjugation to Russia in the 1825, he was among the Hajret Kabardians who migrated to Western Circassia. According to the Russian report dated January 30, 1825, Janseid had between 5 and 20 individual peasants. Although he had to leave all his property behind while migrating, he became richer than ever by standing out in the Circassian campaigns he participated in. He lived in Abzakh lands and had 60 peasant families and 30 serf families. Despite not holding a princely title, he gained recognition comparable to leading Circassian princes due to his experience and leadership capabilities. He collaborated with commanders such as Muhammad Asha and was frequently entrusted with leadership in operations requiring advanced skill and experience.

From the autumn to the end of 1830, his detachment took part in several assaults. These included attacks on Babukovskaya Stanitsa and Major Sokolov's Khopyor Cossack Regiment, the assault on Temnoleskaya Fortress, the attack on Georgi Fortress, and the stealing of horse herds from Borgustanskaya Stanitsa.

Janseid had the title of Hajji and he went to Hajj twice. During his Hajj, he held meetings with various leaders of the Islamic world, including the Viceroy of Egypt, Mehmed Ali Pasha, and his eldest son, Ibrahim Pasha. However, he did not expect any support from these leaders for the Caucasians' struggle for independence. Tornau described Janseid with many attributes: intelligent, charismatic, brave, sympathetic, and honest. He also noted that Janseid approached events with a realistic perspective.

In 1837, on his return from the Hajj, Janseid and his 12 companions, mostly merchants, were mistakenly landed by their ship's captain on the Russian-controlled southern coast instead of the northern shores of Gagra. Shortly after disembarking, a large Russian detachment emerged from a newly built fortress nearby and advanced toward the shore. When the group refused to surrender, the Russians opened fire. Under Janseid's command, they used sacks of goods as cover and engaged in a brief firefight with the Russian troops. As the result of the clash, most of them were killed besides Janseid and one severely wounded companion. Believing everyone was dead, the Russians withdrew to the fortress. At night, Janseid and the wounded companion escaped into the forest and with the help of local Abkhazians they managed to return to Abzakh territory.

In 1838, Janseid met with James Bell. During the meeting, Bell presented him with a British telescope as a gift. According to Bell's account, Janseid emphasized that the people in the interior regions of Circassia still held a strong belief in the struggle for independence. He also stated that if Britain supports them, those who had previously surrendered would take up arms again, and that as Russian oppression increased, the people's hatred towards the Russian side was increased too.

He believed, as he told Tornau, that the Russians would eventually invade the Caucasus, but that this would happen long after his death:

“If the Circassians had been wiser, if they hadn’t fought and killed each other, it would have taken you centuries to establish dominance in the mountains. I am not considering surrender. At my age, it would be unbecoming to abandon the cause I have fought and shed blood for over the past sixty years. I cannot submit to another’s will, to a new order, to new rules. I will die as I was born. My son is young; it will be easier for him to adapt to the new order. If God wills to give the mountains to the Russians, perhaps then he too may choose to be buried beside his father.”

=== Death ===
In 1843, Russian units under the command Russian General V. O. Gurko were patrolling in the Middle Urup. The Russian army consisted of a unit of two infantry battalions, about 500 Cossacks and 4 cannons. On the way back, Officer Tornau was tasked with holding a hill with about 50 Nogai princes in order to get ahead of the troops and ensure the safety of the route.

The Circassian cavalry under Janseid was lacking the time to seize the hill and began gathering on the opposite slope. As Janseid and Tornau observed each other's forces through their telescopes, they saw each other and exchanged greetings from the distance.

After an hour, Cossacks began to descend into the valley, between the two hills. The Circassian horsemen, numbered around 300, launched a sudden charge to the Cossacks and started to overwhelm them. During the attack, the Russian infantry were far away and the cavalry support were not ready, but there was a cannon nearby.

Artillery commander Captain Biryukov gave the order to fire, and with two canister shots from a distance of 300 paces, he struck Hajji Janseid. The Circassian cavalry scattered, lifted Janseid's body from amid the smoke, and quickly retreated.
