= Kabardians =

Circassian tribe

къэбэрдэй адыгэ
- Kabardian Flag

- Circassian Flag

Total population
- ~1,628,500 Kabardian dialect speakers

Regions with significant populations
- Turkey: More than 1,000,000
- Russia: 523,404 (2021 census)
- Kabardino-Balkaria: 502,615
- Karachay-Cherkessia: 13,496

Languages
- Kabardian, Russian, Turkish, Arabic

Religion
- Predominantly Sunni Islam; Minority Russian Orthodox Church and Catholic Church

Related ethnic groups
- Other Circassian tribes, Abkhazians, Abazins

The Kabardians (Kabardian: къэбэрдей адыгэхэр, Adyghe: къэбэртай адыгэхэр, Russian: кабардинцы), or Kabardinians, are one of the twelve major Circassian tribes, representing one of the twelve stars on the green-and-gold Circassian flag. They are also commonly known by the plural terms Kabardin, Kebertei, or Kabarday. Along with the Besleney tribe, they speak a distinctive dialect of Circassian. Historically the Kabardians lived in Kabardia, a region of the north Caucasus. In modern times the Kabardians live mostly in the Russian republic of Kabardino-Balkaria, which partly corresponds to the historic region.

Despite the Soviet administrative divisions that placed Circassians under four different designations and political units, namely Adygeans (Circassians in Adygea), Cherkessians (Circassians in Karachay-Cherkessia), Kabardians (Circassians in Kabardino-Balkaria), and Shapsugs (Circassians in Krasnodar Krai), all four groups are essentially the same people (Circassians). Furthermore, Cherkessians are mostly of the Kabardian and Besleney tribes.

== Population ==
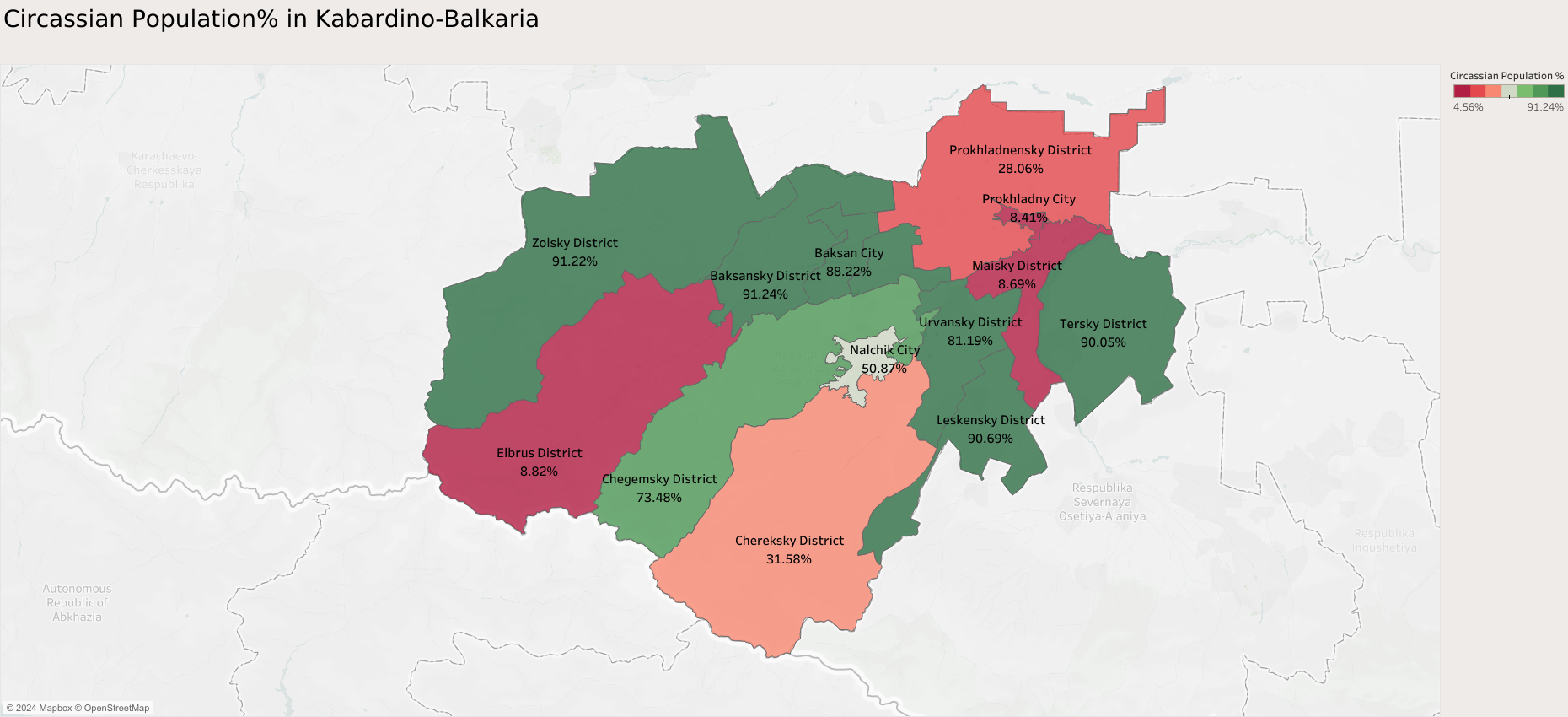
Share of Kabardians by distirct of Kabardino-Balkaria

Kabardians are the largest Circassian group in the world in general and form the largest group in Russia, Turkey, Egypt, and other countries. As of 2002 Kabardians numbered around 520,000 in Kabardino-Balkaria, Russia, and about 50,000 in Karachay-Cherkessia in Russia. In Turkey, where more than 1 million live, they are concentrated on the Uzunyayla plateau of Kayseri Province and around central Turkey. However, there are Kabardian villages in Balıkesir, Düzce, Eskişehir in northwest Turkey, Çorum, Samsun, and Tokat in the Black Sea region, amongst many others. Significant populations of Kabardians also live in Jordan, and there are communities in the United States. In Israel and Jordan, respectively, Shapsugs and Abzakhs are the largest groups.

== Religion ==
Share of Kabardians by settlement of Kabardino-Balkaria

Religions historically practiced by Kabardians include the native Adyghe Xabze faith, Christianity and Islam. The majority of Kabardians had converted to Islam by the early 19th century. There are also still some adherents to traditional Xabze beliefs, with 1.8% of Kabardians practicing in Kabardino-Balkaria, although most Kabardians are either Non-denominational or Sunni Muslims of the Hanafi school. From April 2004 to December 2010, the Spiritual Administration of the Muslims of the Kabardino-Balkarian Republic (SAMKBP) was led by Anas Pshikhachev. RIA Novosti considered him to be one of the most influential Muslim religious figures of the North Caucasus.

Kabardians also constituted one of the earliest Christian communities in Europe, converting in the late 2nd and early 3rd centuries. Kabardians living in Mozdoksky District in the Republic of North Ossetia–Alania are Orthodox Christians. Some of the Kabardians living in the southern part of the neighbouring Kursky district of Stavropol Krai are also Orthodox Christians. There are also some Roman Catholic Kabardians (possibly descended from families who reportedly converted from Orthodoxy during the 13th century). According to the 2012 survey census, of the 240,000 Catholics who lived in Russia, 1.8% were Kabardians.

== Notable Kabardians ==
Population pyramid of the Kabardians in the 2021 Russian Census

- Adil-Giray Atazhukin
- Aleguko Shogenukov
- Alexander A. Cherkassky
- Alexey Cherkassky – Chancellor of the Russian Empire during the reign of Empress Elizabeth
- Alexander Bekovich-Cherkassky – Prince of Kabarda
- Alexander N. Bekovich-Cherkassky
- Amirkhan Shomakhov
- Atazhuko Atazhukin
- Armande Kumpal Kabartay Altaï-Magini
- Aslanbek Khushtov – Member of the Parliament of Kabardino-Balkarian Republic and athlete who has won a gold medal in the 2008 Summer Olympics
- Avenir Tchemerzine – Colonel of the Russian imperial army and mathematician before becoming a bibliographer
- Bidar Kadın – Imperial consort of Abdul Hamid II of the Ottoman Empire
- Boris Cherkassky
- Caner Dagli – Islamic scholar and author
- Dmitry Cherkassky
- Doamna Ecaterina Cercheza – Princess consort of the Voivode of Moldavia as the wife of Vasile Lupu
- Elmirza Bekovich-Cherkassky
- Fyodor A. Bekovich-Cherkasski
- Fyodor N. Bekovich-Cherkasski
- Grigory Cherkassky
- Janseid Wuvizhuqo
- Idar of Kabardia
- Inal the Great – Prince of Kabarda
- Ismail Bey Atazhukin
- Ivan Amashuk
- Ivan B. Cherkassky – Cousin of Michael I of Russia
- Ivan E. Cherkassky
- Jacop Cherkassky
- Kasbulat Cherkassky
- Kasei Atazhukin
- Kambulat Cherkassky
- Kelemet Cherkassky
- Kudenet Cherkassky
- Kurgoko Atazhukin
- Ladislas du Luart, Comtesse Leïla Hagondokoff – Recipient of the National Order of Merit and National Order of the Legion of Honor (Commander), model for the French high-fashion house Chanel
- Ludmilla Monique Tchérina
- haseki Mahidevran sultan – Imperial consort of Suleiman the Magnificent of the Ottoman Empire
- Mamstryuk Cherkassky
- Maria Temryukovna – Tsaritsa of the Tsardom of Russia as the wife of Ivan the Terrible
- Michael A. Cherkassky I
- Michael A. Cherkassky II
- Michael T. Cherkassky
- Michael Y. Cherkassky
- Mutsal Cherkassky
- Nikita Egupov-Cherkassky
- Peter Amashukov-Cherkassky
- Peter B. Cherkassky
- Pshemakho Kotsev - Second Prime Minister of the Mountainous Republic of the Northern Caucasus.
- Roslanbek Atazhukin
- Rusudan of Circassia – Queen consort of Georgia (Kartli) as the wife of King Vakhtang VI
- Servetseza Kadın – First wife of Abdulmejid I of the Ottoman Empire
- Sholokh Cherkassky
- Simon Cherkassky
- Sunchalei Cherkassky
- Temryuk – Prince of Kabarda
- Vasily Amashukov-Cherkassky
- Vasily Kardanukovich Cherkassky
- Vladimir Cherkassky – Mayor of Moscow (1868–1870)
- Yefim Bekovich-Cherkassky
- Yuri Temirkanov – Music Director and Chief Conductor of the Saint Petersburg Philharmonic Orchestra since 1988
- Zaur Tutov

== Gallery ==
Yinal speaking Adyghe and Kabardian

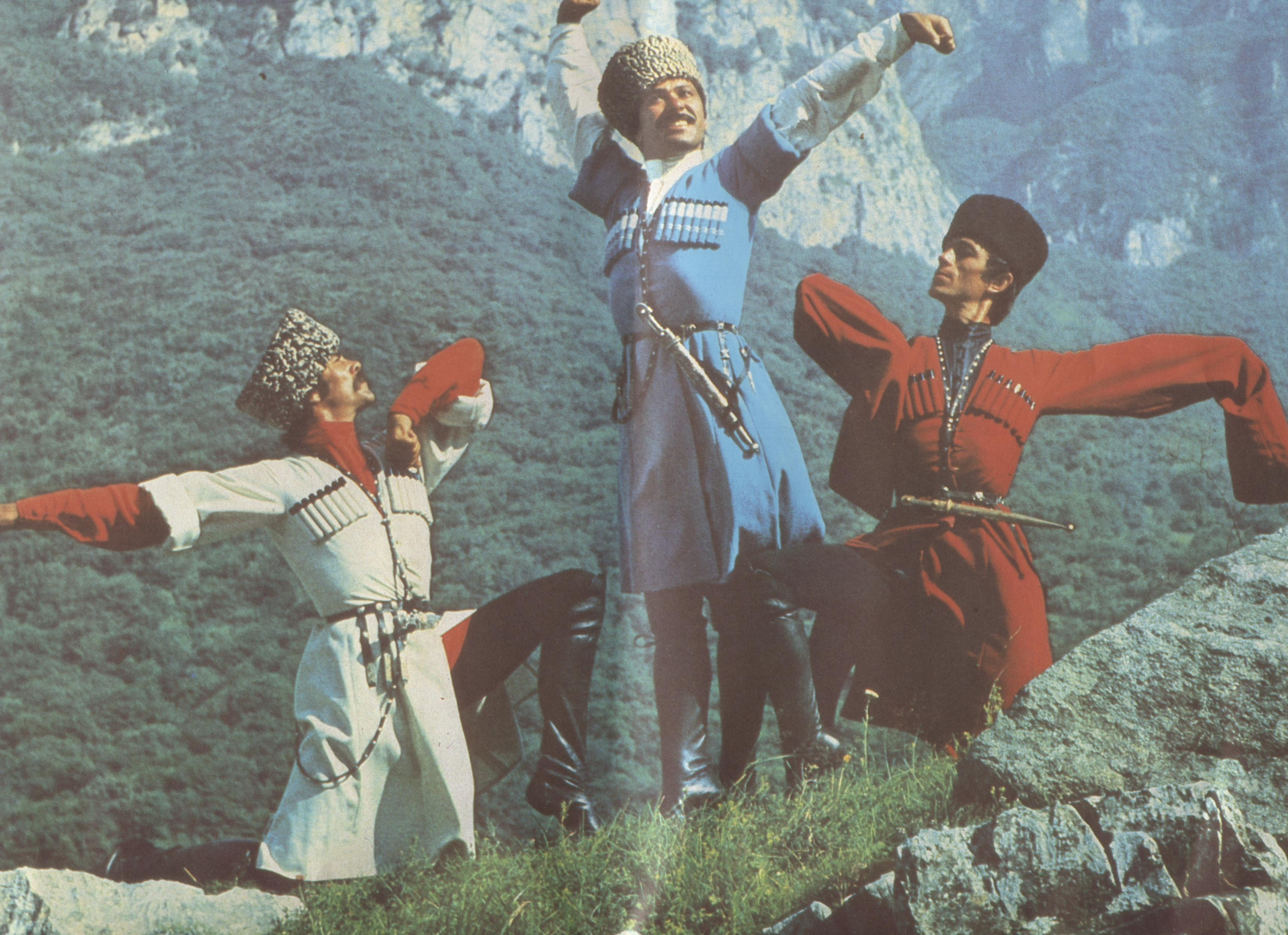
Kabardian dancers in traditional dress

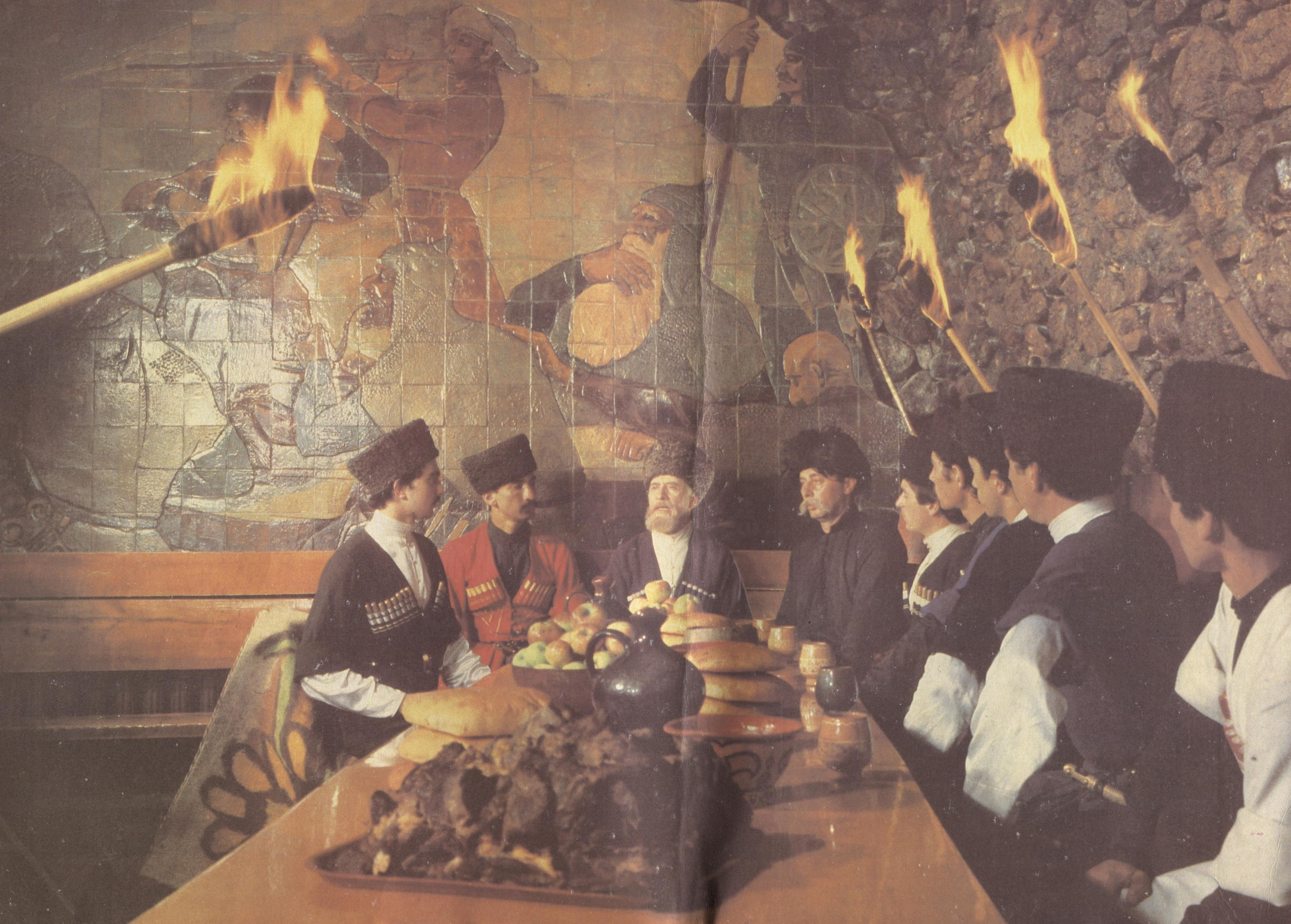
Kabardian men in traditional dress

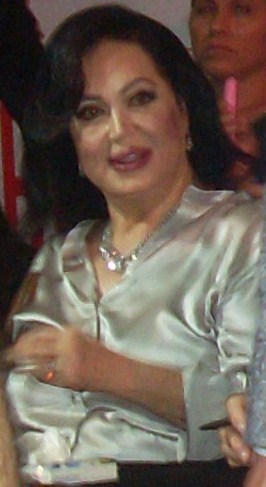

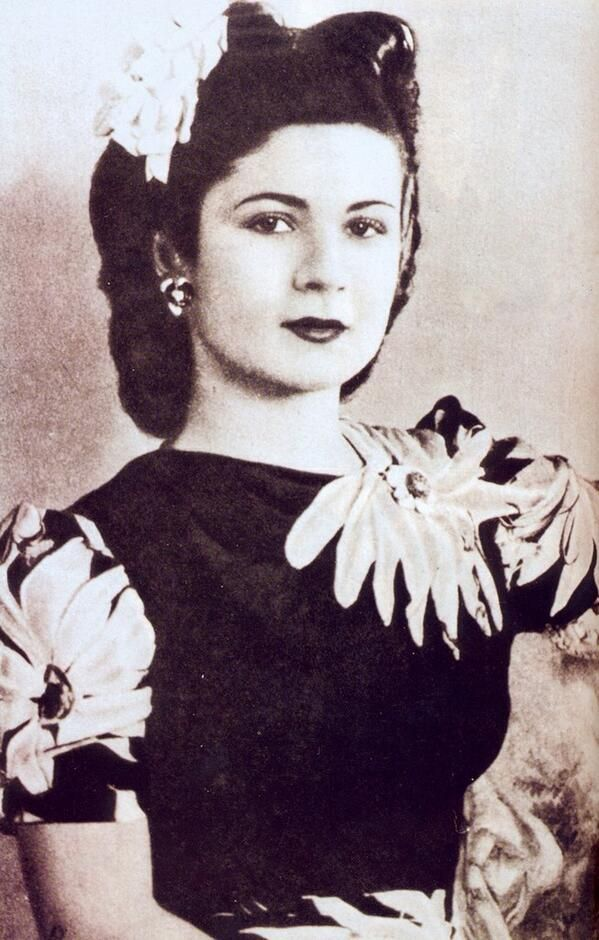

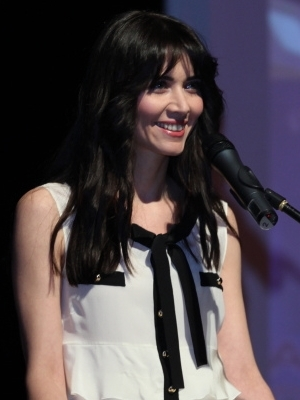

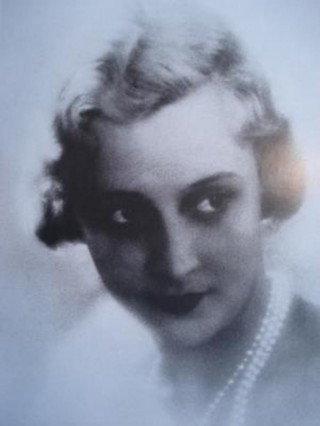

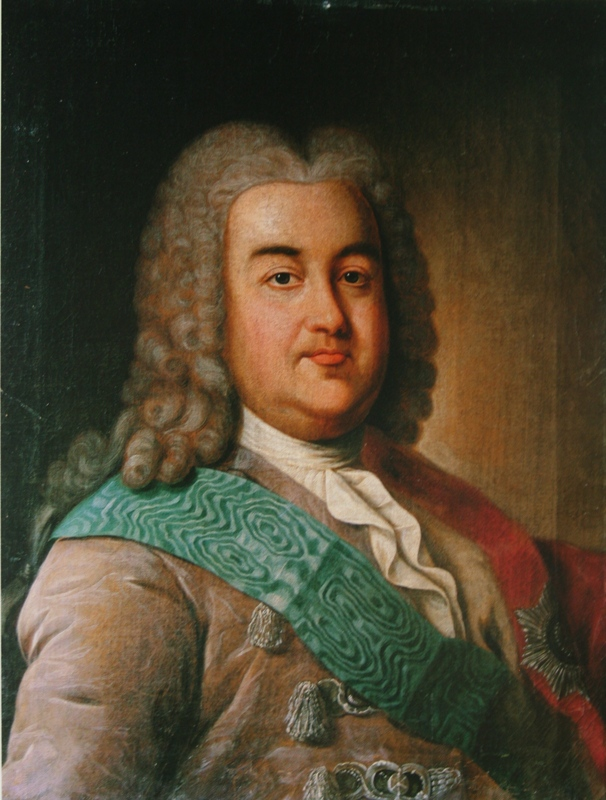

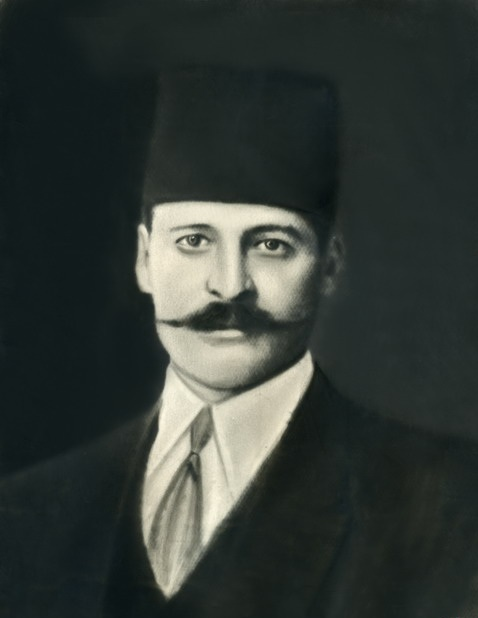

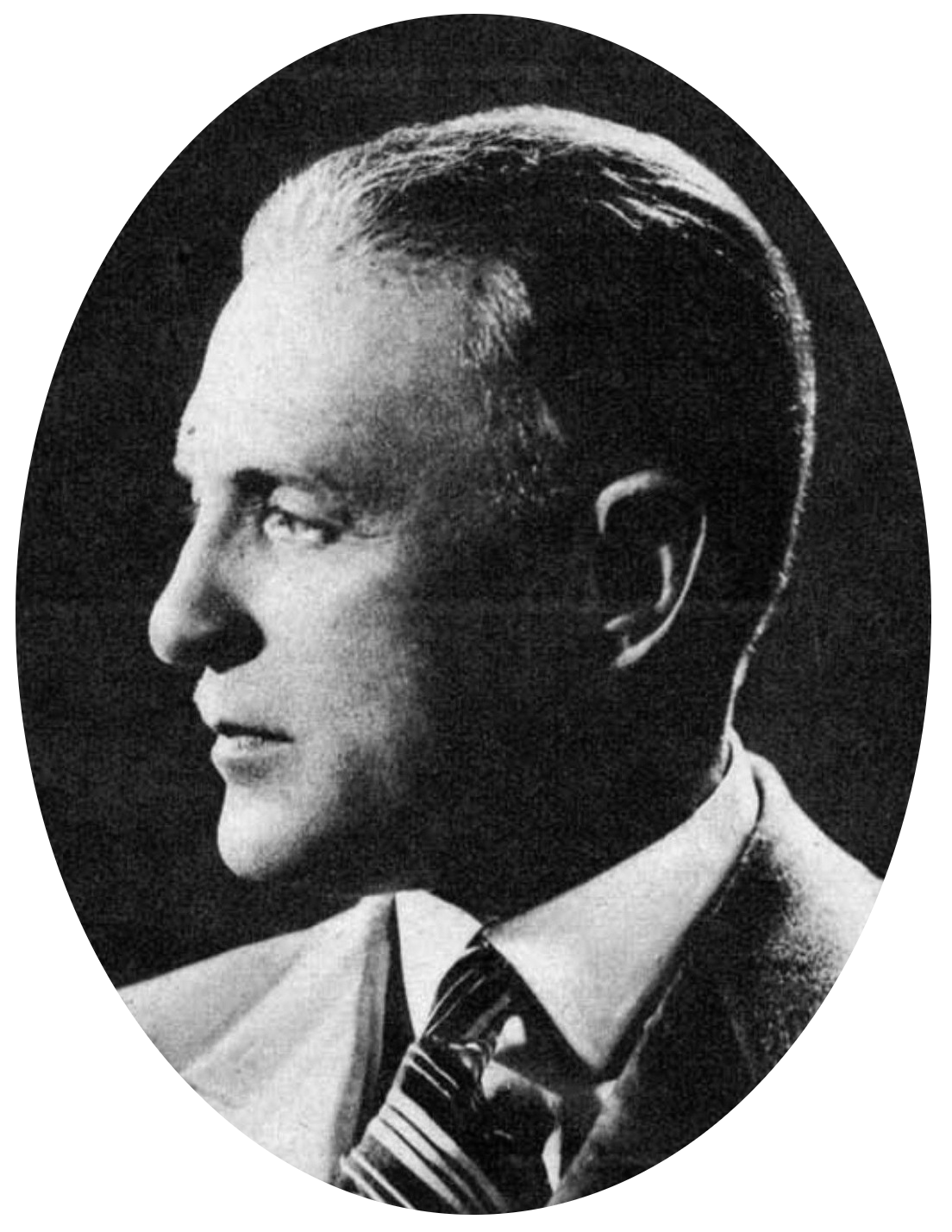

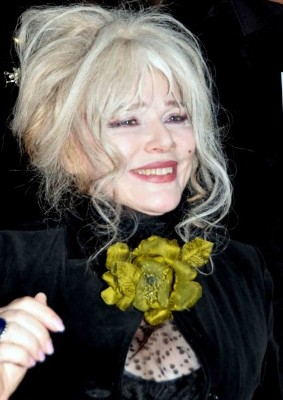

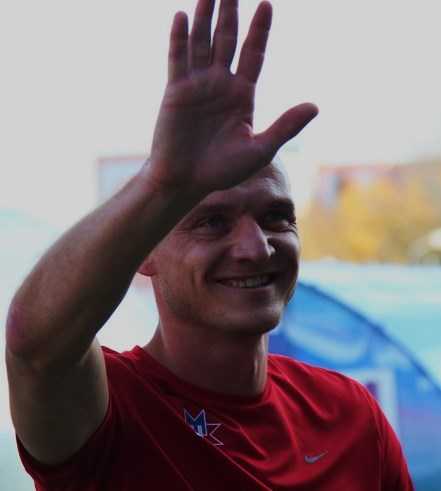

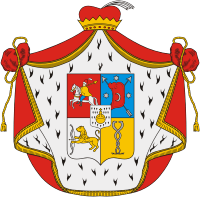

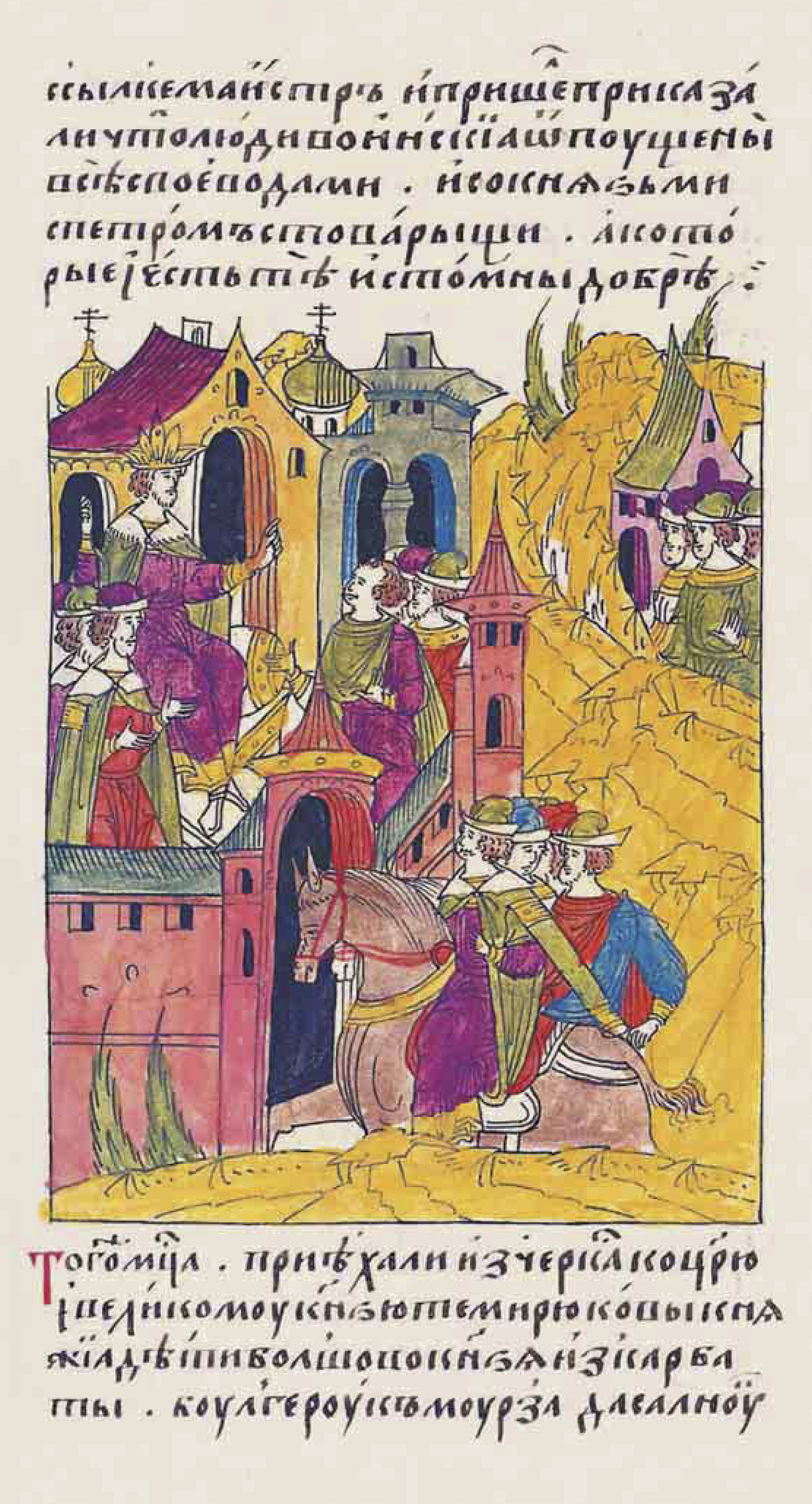

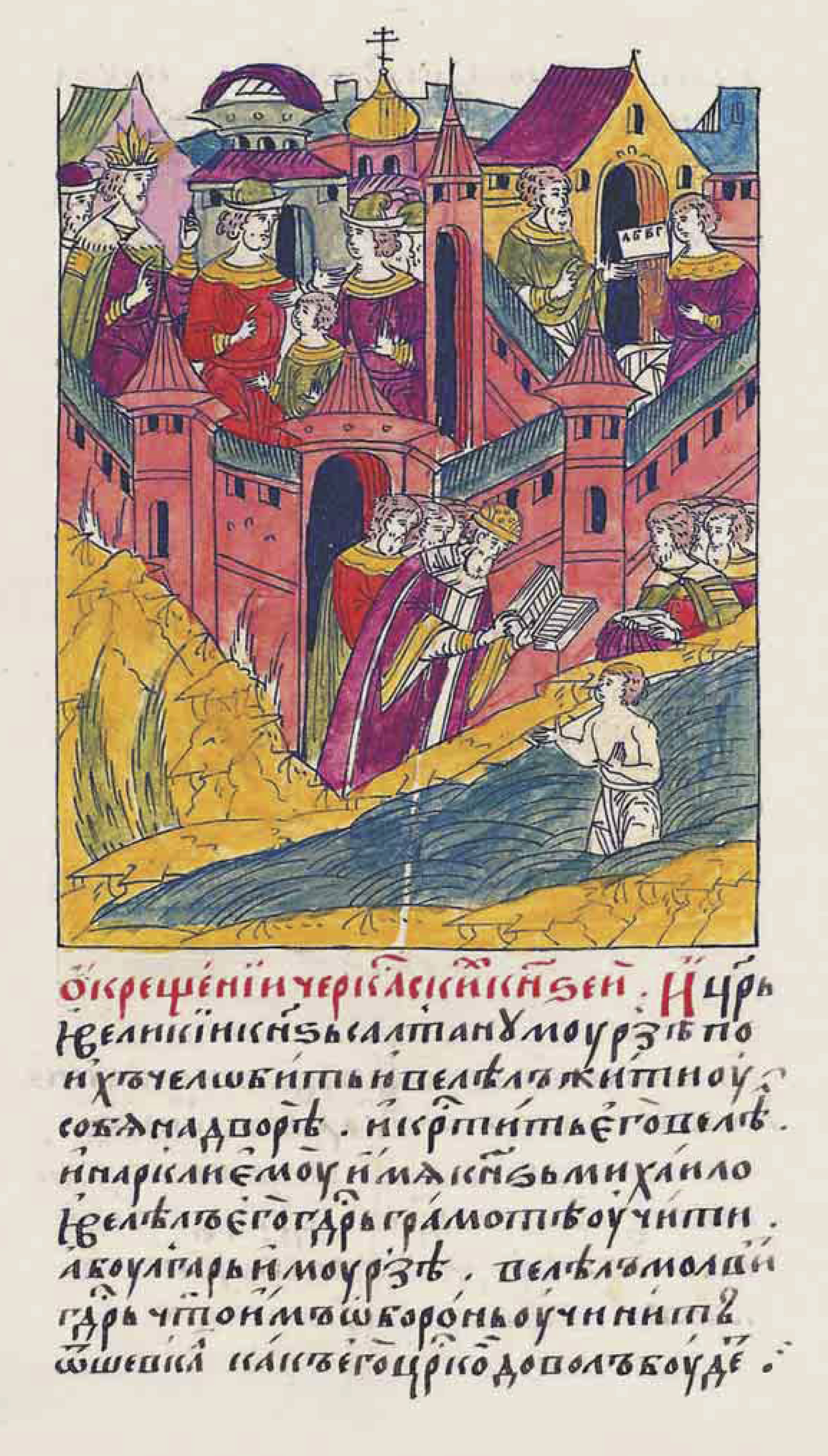

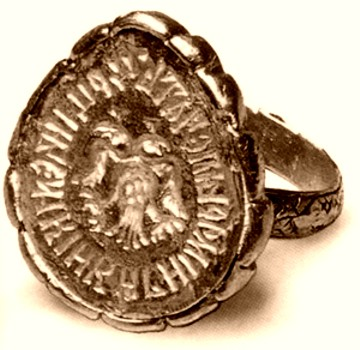

== See also ==
- Kabardia
- Other Circassian tribes:
- Abzakh
- Besleney
- Bzhedug
- Hatuqwai
- Mamkhegh
- Natukhai
- Shapsug
- Temirgoy
- Ubykh
- Yegeruqwai
- Zhaney
