= Zaur Tutov =

- Born: Zaur Nazhidovich Tutov; October 2, 1951 (age 74); Baksan
- Education: Gnessin State Musical College
- Occupation: Singer
- Years active: 1973–present
- Spouse: Madina Tutova
- Children: 3

Zaur Nazhidovich Tutov (Russian: Заур Нажидович Тутов; born October 2, 1951, Staraya Krepost village (now Baksan), Kabardino-Balkarian Autonomous Soviet Socialist Republic, RSFSR, USSR) is a singer (tenor baritone). People's Artist of the Russian Federation (2011). Minister of Culture and Information Communications of Kabardino-Balkaria (2005–2008).

== Biography ==
He was born on October 2, 1951, in the village of Baksan. His mother was a cashier named Fatima. His Father died in a car accident when he was an infant. The only sister Tatiana lives in Nalchik.

Up to the 4th grade of the school he studied at (the Kabardian school) and did not know a word of Russian.

He graduated from the vocal department of the musical school in Nalchik.

Since 1971 to 1973 he served in the Soviet Army, in the ground forces on Sakhalin.

After retiring to the reserve, he worked as a soloist in the Kabardino-Balkarian Philharmonic.

Fame came in 1973, when Zaur Tutov took second place at the All-Union competition in Minsk. Laureate of the World Festival of Youth and Students in East Berlin.

Since 1989 to 1992 he worked as a senior teacher of the vocal class of the Russian Academy of Theatre Arts.
