= Ajdjeriyiqo Kushuk =

Circassian prince and military commander

Prince Ajdjeriyiqo Kushuk Bechmirza
- Бэчмырзэ Ажджэриикъуэ Кушыку
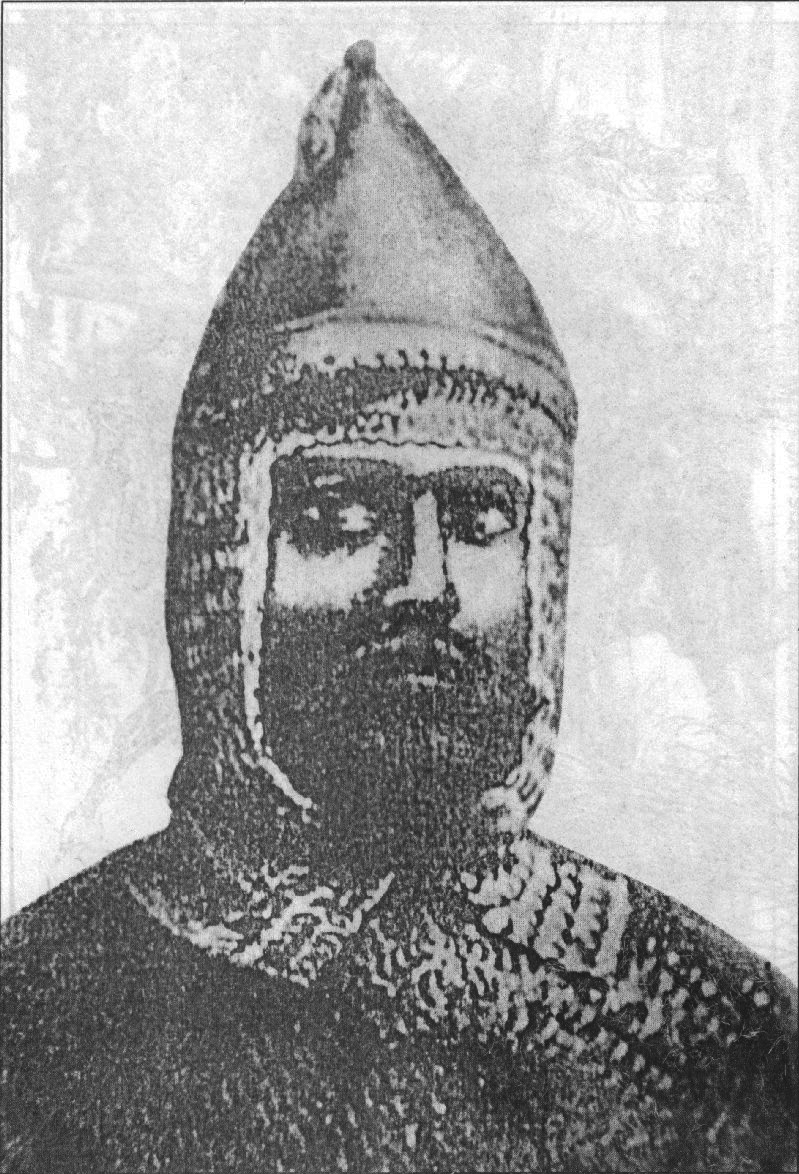
- Modern depiction of Ajdjeriyiqo Kushuk
- Born: c. 19th c. Kabardia, Circassia
- Died: 23 January [O.S. 11 January] 1830; Urup River, Besleney, Circassia
- Relatives: Muhammad Asha; Karamirza Aliy
- Military career
- Allegiance: Kabardia (East Circassia); Circassian Confederation
- Nicknames: The Guide of the Circassian Land; The Guide
- Conflicts: Russo-Circassian War

Ajdjeriyiqo Kushuk Bechmirza (Note: Kabardian: Ажджэриикъуэ Кушыку, Азджэрий, Азджэриикъуэ, Ажджэрий, Ажджэриикъуэ, Алджэрий, Алджэриикъуэ Russian: Ажгиреев, Адилгиреев, Ажгирей, Аджигиреев, Ажджериюко) (Kabardian: Бэчмырзэ Ажджэриикъуэ Кушыку, Russian: Ажгериев Кушук), was a Circassian military commander and prince. He took part in the Russo-Circassian War.

== Biography ==
=== Name ===
Kushuk's surname is Bechmirza, and Ajdjeriyiqo means "son of Ajdjeriy". In different sources, it is found as, Adzhgirey or Kushikupsh. In Circassian languages, names and surnames ending with the suffix '-psh', as in the variant Kushikupsh, imply that the person is a prince, derived from the word 'pshi', meaning prince.

Kushuk's nickname was "the guide" (гъуазэ) or "the guide of the Circassian land".

=== Early life ===
Since the Circassians did not write their history and all the information comes from external sources, the details about Ajdjeriyiqo's youth are not well-documented. According to the oral sources, he was a member of the Bechmirza family, one of the Kabardian princely families. His exact birth date is not known. Ajdjeriyiqo was born in Kabardia and raised with a martial education. His cousin from his mother side was Muhammad Asha and his uncle from his mother side was Prince Karamirza Aliy.

=== Russo-Circassian War ===
He has participated in wars against the Russians since his youth. He was one of the Hajret Kabardians who migrated to Western Circassia after the Russian occupation of Kabardia to continue the war. He migrated in 1817. In Circassian folk tales, Ajdjeriyiqo's skill in finding directions by observing the stars is frequently mentioned. As a very famous cavalry commander among the Circassians, many songs, laments, and stories have been told about him in both Adyghe and Kabardian. Even during his lifetime, songs were sung about him. It has been recorded that when a call to arms was issued, the warriors promptly assembled under his command. He was a friend of famous commanders and warriors such as Khirtsizhiqo Ale and Shogen Shumakho.

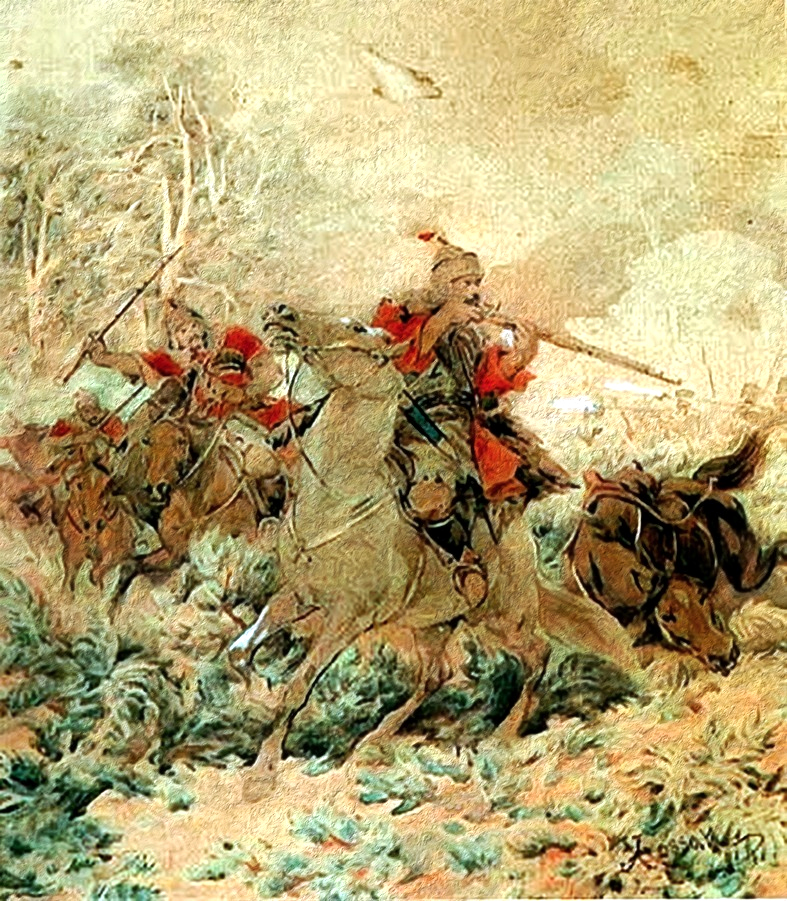
The Circassians in the Caucasian War, Juliusz Kossak.

On April 1, 1825, General Velyaminov issued an order to destroy the villages of Hajret Kabardians. On April 5, the Russian army, under the command of Fedor Aleksandrovich Bekovich-Cherkasski, launched an unexpected attack on the Karamirzey village in the Besleney region. The Russians obtained the exact location of the village, as well as the difficult routes to avoid detection, by interrogating a captured shepherd. Karamirzey was 7-8 times larger than other Circassian villages. The villagers were Hajret Kabardians, and the village was named after its prince; famous Hajret Kabardian Prince Karamırza Aliy Misost. Besides Aliy, famous warriors also lived in this village.

During the attack, Prince Karamırza Aliy was killed, the village was plundered, set on fire, and destroyed, the villagers were massacred, and the surviving minority was taken captive. When the Jambolat Qeytuqo and Ajdjeriyiqo's armies arrived at the village, the Russians had already retreated. The two wives of Karamirza, named Haniy and Yelmiskhan, were captured as spoils of war, and Haniy was gifted to Prince Astemir, who had helped in the destruction of the village. Upon hearing the news, the Circassian commanders decided to seek revenge on those who had helped the Russians in the massacre. Ajdjeriyiqo rode 400 kilometers and arrived at Astemirov's village in Lesser Kabardia, challenging him to a duel. Ajdjeriyiqo killed Astemirov and, in the oral sources, he took the widowed wife of Karamirza Aliy back to Western Circassia. According to Russian sources, Haniy was forced to marry with Fyodor Bekovich-Cherkasski before the death of Astemirov.

In December 1828, a Russian detachment launched a sudden attack on Kushuk’s village at the source of the Laba River and captured 120 people. Among the captives were Kushuk's little son and his son’s wet nurse.

=== Death ===
On January 11, 1830, he was severely wounded while defending an Abazin village near the banks of the Urup River and died from his injuries. After the battle, his body was carried on horseback to his village by his cavalries.

According to a different version, on April 17, 1829, a group of 20 which led by Ajdjeriyiqo Kushuk and the Ubykh leader Pshimaf Babuqo, raided the village of Nogay prince Ismail Aliyev, who was under Russian protection. The Circassians, unaware that Ismail was in the village, intended only to seize livestock and take a few captives. However, upon learning of the attack, Ismail pursued them with 24 of his men and began fighting in the evening near the Urup River. During the clash, Ismail shot and heavily wounded Kushuk. After that, Pshimaf Babuqo came and fired at Ismail, inflicting a fatal wound that led to his death, but Pshimaf himself was killed immediately afterward by Ismail’s bullet. After the clash, Kushuk was brought back to his village while severely wounded and died there.

== Legacy ==
There are nearly 50 folkloric elements recorded in the archives of the Adygea Institute of Social Sciences related to Ajdjeriyiqo Kushuk. In a traditional Abzakh song, Kushuk and Ale are mentioned as follows: (Note: Recorded in Kabardian dialect: (Kabardian: Си нэм къилъагъужахэм Кушыкупщыр я нэхъ лӏыфӏщ, лIыуэ шыбг итIысхьахэм Алэр я нэхъ ябгэщ))

Among those my eyes behold, the most honorable is Prince Kushuk; among the valiant riders, the most courageous is Ale.
