= Hakuchi =

Hakuchi can refer to:

- Hakuchi Adyghe dialect, a minority dialect of Adyghe spoken in Turkey
- The Idiot (1951 film) (Hakuchi), a film directed by Akira Kurosawa
- Hakuchi (1999 film), a film starring Tadanobu Asano
- Hakuchi (era), the Japanese name for the years 650–654

== See also ==
- Hakuchey, a Circassian warrior clan
