= Pronouns in Circassian =

In the Circassian language, pronouns belong to the following groups: personal, demonstrative, possessive, interrogative, reflexive, determinative, and indefinite.

== Personal pronouns ==
In Circassian, personal pronouns are strictly expressed only in the first person and second person in singular and plural forms.

Circassian does not have gender-distinguishing pronouns. Unlike most languages, it does not have "traditional" third-person pronouns (he, she, it, they). The concept of the third person is expressed using demonstrative pronouns.

Case	1st Person (I / We)		2nd Person (You)	
Case	West (Adyghe)	East (Kabardian)	West (Adyghe)	East (Kabardian)
Singular
Absolutive	сэ [sa]	сэ [sa]	о [wa]	уэ [wa]
Ergative	сэ	сэ	о	уэ
Instrumental	сэркӀэ	сэркӀэ	оркӀэ	уэркӀэ
Adverbial	сэрэу	сэрэу	орэу	уэрэу
Plural
Absolutive	тэ [ta]	дэ [da]	шъо [ʃʷa]	фэ [fa]
Ergative	тэ	дэ	шъо	фэ
Instrumental	тэркӀэ	дэркӀэ	шъоркӀэ	фэркӀэ
Adverbial	тэрэу	дэрэу	шъорэу	фэрэу

Examples:

West	сэ	о	усэплъы
East	сэ	уэ	усоплъ
	I	you	I am looking at you
"I am looking at you."

West	мы	Ӏофыр	сэркӀэ	къины
East	мы	Ӏуэхур	сэркӀэ	гугъущ
	this	work	for me	hard
"This work is hard for me."

== Demonstrative pronouns (3rd Person) ==
Circassian uses demonstrative pronouns to fulfill the role of the third person. Unlike English "he", "she", or "it", which are abstract references, Circassian pronouns are spatial—they point to "that one" or "this one".

There are three main demonstratives, distinguished by distance and visibility:

- а (Neutral/Invisible): Refers to someone/something not visible, abstract, or mentioned previously.
- мы (Proximal): Refers to someone/something visible and close to the speaker ("this one").
- мо (Distal): Refers to someone/something visible but far away ("that one over there").

=== Forms ===
A major difference between West and East Circassian appears in the Oblique/Ergative case: West uses -щ (-ɕ), while East uses -бы (-bə).

Case	Neutral (He/She/That)		Proximal (This)		Distal (That yonder)	
Case	West	East	West	East	West	East
Singular
Absolutive	ар	ар	мыр	мыр	мор	мор
Ergative	ащ	абы	мыщ	мыбы	мощ	мобы
Instrumental	ащкӀэ	абыкӀэ	мыщкӀэ	мыбыкӀэ	мощкӀэ	мобыкӀэ
Adverbial	арэу	арэу	мырэу	мырэу	морэу	морэу
Plural
Absolutive	ахэр	ахэр	мыхэр	мыхэр	мохэр	мохэр
Ergative	ахэмэ	абыхэм	мыхэмэ	мыбыхэм	мохэмэ	мобыхэм
Instrumental	ахэмкӀэ	абыхэмкӀэ	мыхэмкӀэ	мыбыхэмкӀэ	мохэмкӀэ	мобыхэмкӀэ
Adverbial	ахэрэу	ахэрэу	мыхэрэу	мыхэрэу	мохэрэу	мохэрэу

Examples:

West	мор	о	уимашинэ
East	мор	уэ	уи машинщ
	that (visible)	you	your car
"That is your car."

West	ащ	къысиӀуагъэр	мыщ	есӀотэжьыгъ
East	абы	къызжиӀар	мыбы	жесӀэжащ
	that one (erg.)	the thing (s)he told me	this one (erg.)	I told him back
"I told this person the things that person told me."

West	ахэмкӀэ	мы	джанэу	мощ	щыгъэр	дахэ
East	абыхэмкӀэ	мы	джанэу	мобы	щыгъыр	дахэщ
	for them	this	shirt	that one	wearing	beautiful
"According to them, the shirt that person is wearing is beautiful."

== Reflexive pronouns ==
Circassian has specific reflexive pronouns used when the subject and object are the same person (e.g., "He hurt himself"). These are primarily used for the third person.

Case	Singular (Himself/Herself)		Plural (Themselves)	
Case	West (Adyghe)	East (Kabardian)	West (Adyghe)	East (Kabardian)
Absolutive	ежь	езы / ежь	ежьхэр	езыхэр
Ergative	ежь	езым	ежьхэмэ	езыхэм
Instrumental	ежькӀэ	езымкӀэ	ежьхэмкӀэ	езыхэмкӀэ

Example:

West	ежь	сэ	къысиӀуагъ
East	езым	сэ	къызжиӀащ
	himself	I	(s)he told me
"He told me himself."

== Possessive pronouns ==
Possessive pronouns indicate ownership ("mine", "yours"). In Circassian, these are distinct from the possessive prefixes attached to nouns.

The base form of a possessive pronoun (e.g. сэсый "mine", оуй "yours", ий "his") has no noun case: it is used predicatively, as the predicate of sentences such as "this house is mine", and it never takes case suffixes in this function. When the pronoun instead stands for the possessed object itself — "the one that is mine", "the one that is yours" — it is substantivized: it behaves like a noun and takes the regular noun case suffixes, the absolutive -р (сэсыер "the one that is mine"), the ergative -м (сэсыем) and the instrumental -(м)кӀэ (сэсыемкӀэ "with mine").

Form		1st (Mine/Ours)		2nd (Yours)		3rd (His/Theirs)	
Form		West	East	West	East	West	East
Singular Possessor
Base form ("mine") — caseless		сэсый	сэсей	оуй	уоуэ/уий	ий	ей
Substantivized ("the one that is mine")	Absolutive	сэсыер	сэсейр	оуиер	уийр	иер	ейр
Substantivized ("the one that is mine")	Ergative	сэсыем	сэсейм	оуим	уийм	ием	ейм
Substantivized ("the one that is mine")	Instrumental	сэсыемкӀэ	сэсеймкӀэ	оуемкӀэ	уоуэмкӀэ	иемкӀэ	еймкӀэ
Plural Possessor
Base form ("ours") — caseless		тэтый	дэдей	шъошъуй	фий	яй	яй
Substantivized ("the one that is ours")	Absolutive	тэтыер	дэдейр	шъошъуиер	фийр	яер	яйр
Substantivized ("the one that is ours")	Ergative	тэтыем	дэдейм	шъошъуим	фийм	яем	яйм
Substantivized ("the one that is ours")	Instrumental	тэтыемкӀэ	дэдеймкӀэ	шъошъуемкӀэ	фиймкӀэ	яемкӀэ	яймкӀэ

The third person also has an emphatic (reflexive) form built on ежь "self": ежьый "his own" (East езым ей), as in мыр оуя ежья? "Is this yours or his (own)?".

Examples:

West	мы	джэгуалъэхэр	сэсиех
East	мы	джэгуалъэхэр	сэсейхэщ
	this	toys	they are mine
"These toys are mine."

West	мо	унэ	плъэгъурэ	сэсый
East	мо	унэ	плъагъури	сэсейщ
	that	house	seeing	mine
"That house you are seeing is mine."

West	мыр	оуя	ежья?
East	мыр	уоуэ	хьэмэрэ езым ей?
	this	yours?	is it his?
"Is this yours or his?"

Examples of the substantivized (case-marked) forms:

West	сэсыер	ины
East	сэсейр	инщ
	the one that is mine	big
"Mine (the one that is mine) is big."

West	оуиер	дахэ
East	уийр	дахэщ
	the one that is yours	beautiful
"Yours (the one that is yours) is beautiful."

West	сэсыем	еплъ
East	сэсейм	еплъ
	at the one that is mine (erg.)	look!
"Look at mine."

West	оуемкӀэ	тхэ
East	уоуэмкӀэ	тхэ
	with yours (instr.)	write!
"Write with yours."

=== Predicative forms ===
Possessive pronouns are commonly used as predicates ("this is mine"). When the subject of such a predicate is a first or second person, the pronoun takes the corresponding absolutive person prefix, producing a single-word predicate: у-сэсый "you are mine", сы-оуй "I am yours". A third-person plural subject is marked by the plural suffix (West -(э)х, East -хэ): сэсиех "they are mine".

After a person prefix, the third-person possessive pronouns ий "his" and яй "theirs" appear with the linking consonant р: с-рый "I am his", у-ряй "you are theirs".

A dash marks combinations in which the possessor and the subject refer (in part) to the same person(s) (e.g. *"I am mine", *"we are mine"); such combinations do not occur.

West Adyghe
Possessor	Subject					
Possessor	I	You (sg.)	He/She/It	We	You (pl.)	They
Mine	—	усэсый	сэсый	—	шъусэсый	сэсиех
Yours (sg.)	сыоуй	—	оуй	тыоуй	—	оуиех
His/Hers	срый	урый	ий	трый	шъурый	иех
Ours	—	утэтый	тэтый	—	шъутэтый	тэтиех
Yours (pl.)	сышъошъуй	—	шъошъуй	тышъошъуй	—	шъошъуиех
Theirs	сряй	уряй	яй	тряй	шъуряй	яех

In Kabardian the same construction uses the Kabardian person prefixes (сы-, у-, ды-, фы-), and the final element -ый of the Western forms corresponds to Eastern -ий/-ей (West сыоуй → East сыуэуий). In declarative sentences the predicate additionally takes the affirmative suffix -щ: усэсейщ "you are mine", сэсейхэщ "they are mine". The suffix is absent in questions: усэсей? "are you mine?".

East Circassian (Kabardian)
Possessor	Subject					
Possessor	I	You (sg.)	He/She/It	We	You (pl.)	They
Mine	—	усэсей	сэсей	—	фысэсей	сэсейхэ
Yours (sg.)	сыуэуий	—	уоуэ/уий	дыуэуий	—	уэуийхэ
His/Hers	сырей	урей	ей	дырей	фырей	ейхэ
Ours	—	удэдей	дэдей	—	фыдэдей	дэдейхэ
Yours (pl.)	сыфий	—	фий	дыфий	—	фийхэ
Theirs	сыряй	уряй	яй	дыряй	фыряй	яйхэ

Examples:

West	о	сэ	усэсый
East	уэ	сэ	усэсейщ
	you	I	you are mine
"You are mine."

West	сэ	шъо	шъусэсый
East	сэ	фэ	фысэсейщ
	I	you (pl.)	you (pl.) are mine
"You (plural) are mine."

West	сэ	о	сыоуй
East	сэ	уэ	сыуэуийщ
	I	you	I am yours
"I am yours."

West	сэ	шъо	сышъошъуй
East	сэ	фэ	сыфийщ
	I	you (pl.)	I am yours (pl.)
"I am yours (plural)."

West	о	тэ	утэтый
East	уэ	дэ	удэдейщ
	you	we	you are ours
"You are ours."

West	мы	унэр	тэтый
East	мы	унэр	дэдейщ
	this	house	it is ours
"This house is ours."

West	ащ	сэ	срый
East	абы	сэ	сырейщ
	him	I	I am his
"I am his."

West	ащ	ар	ий
East	абы	ар	ейщ
	his	it	it is his
"It is his."

West	мы	тхылъхэр	яех
East	мы	тхылъхэр	яйхэщ
	this	books	they are theirs
"These books are theirs."

=== Possessive Prefixes ===
Possession is a key grammatical feature in Adyghe. Unlike independent possessive pronouns ("mine"), these are prefixes attached directly to the noun. Nouns are divided into two categories based on the relationship between the possessor and the possessed:

- Inalienable (Organic) possession: Used for things that cannot be separated from the possessor (body parts, family, intrinsic positions).
- Alienable (Proprietary) possession: Used for transferable property, objects, and concepts.

Note: This distinction is strictly maintained in West Adyghe. In Eastern Circassian (Kabardian), this distinction has largely disappeared, and the "Alienable" prefixes are used for almost all nouns.

==== Inalienable possession ====
In West Adyghe, inalienable possession is marked by short prefixes attached to the noun stem. This category includes:

- Body parts: e.g., head, heart, leg.
- Kinship terms: e.g., mother, brother, daughter.
- Name: ыцӀэ
- Part-whole relations: ычӀэгъ (its under), ыкӀоцӀ (its inside), ыпэ (its front/nose).

Person	Prefix		Example (Head)	
Person	West (Adyghe)	East (Kabardian)	West (Adyghe)	East (Kabardian)
1st Sing	с- / сы-	си-	с-шъхьэ	си щхьэ
2nd Sing	п- / у-	уи-	п-шъхьэ	уи щхьэ
3rd Sing	ы-	и-	ы-шъхьэ	и щхьэ
1st Plur	т- / ты-	ди-	т-шъхьэ	ди щхьэ
2nd Plur	шъу-	фи-	шъу-шъхьэ	фи щхьэ
3rd Plur	а-	я-	а-шъхьэ	я щхьэ

==== Alienable possession ====
Alienable possession is used for separable items, such as property, animals, concepts, and material objects. In West Adyghe, these prefixes involve the additional vowel -и- (-i-). In Kabardian, these same prefixes are used for almost all situations.

Person	Prefix		Example (House)	
Person	West (Adyghe)	East (Kabardian)	West (Adyghe)	East (Kabardian)
1st Sing	си-	си-	си-унэ	си унэ
2nd Sing	уи-	уи-	уи-унэ	уи унэ
3rd Sing	и-	и-	и-унэ	и унэ
1st Plur	ти-	ди-	ти-унэ	ди унэ
2nd Plur	шъуи-	фи-	шъуи-унэ	фи унэ
3rd Plur	я-	я-	я-унэ	я унэ

==== Predicative possession ====
The possessive prefixes can likewise combine with the absolutive person prefixes directly on a possessed noun, producing predicates of the type "you are my child". The structure is [subject prefix] + [possessive prefix] + noun: о сэ у-си-кӀал "you are my child" (2sg. subject + 1sg. possessor + "child").

As with the possessive pronouns, the third-person possessive prefixes и- and я- take the linking consonant р after a subject prefix: у-ри-кӀал "you are his child".

West Adyghe (prefix combinations)
Possessor	Subject					
Possessor	I	You (sg.)	He/She/It	We	You (pl.)	They
My	—	уси-	си-	—	шъуси-	си-…-эх
Your (sg.)	сыуи-	—	уи-	тыуи-	—	уи-…-эх
His/Her	сри-	ури-	и-	три-	шъури-	и-…-эх
Our	—	ути-	ти-	—	шъути-	ти-…-эх
Your (pl.)	сышъуи-	—	шъуи-	тышъуи-	—	шъуи-…-эх
Their	сря-	уря-	я-	тря-	шъуря-	я-…-эх

East Circassian (Kabardian; declaratives additionally take -щ)
Possessor	Subject					
Possessor	I	You (sg.)	He/She/It	We	You (pl.)	They
My	—	уси-	си-	—	фыси-	си-…-хэ
Your (sg.)	сыуи-	—	уи-	дыуи-	—	уи-…-хэ
His/Her	сыри-	ури-	и-	дыри-	фыри-	и-…-хэ
Our	—	уди-	ди-	—	фыди-	ди-…-хэ
Your (pl.)	сыфи-	—	фи-	дыфи-	—	фи-…-хэ
Their	сыря-	уря-	я-	дыря-	фыря-	я-…-хэ

A plural subject is marked on the noun: шъусикӀалэх "you (pl.) are my children" (East фысищӀалэхэщ).

Examples:

West	о	сэ	усикӀал
East	уэ	сэ	усищӀалэщ
	you	I	you are my child
"You are my child."

West	сэ	о	сыуикӀал
East	сэ	уэ	сыуищӀалэщ
	I	you	I am your child
"I am your child."

West	ар	сикӀал
East	ар	сищӀалэщ
	he	he is my child
"He is my child."

West	ащ	о	урикӀал
East	абы	уэ	урищӀалэщ
	his	you	you are his child
"You are his child."

West	о	тэ	утикӀал
East	уэ	дэ	удищӀалэщ
	you	we	you are our child
"You are our child."

West	о	сэ	усиныбджэгъу
East	уэ	сэ	усиныбжьэгъущ
	you	I	you are my friend
"You are my friend."

West	шъо	сэ	шъусикӀалэх
East	фэ	сэ	фысищӀалэхэщ
	you (pl.)	I	you are my children
"You (plural) are my children."

== Interrogative pronouns ==
Interrogative pronouns correspond to English Wh-words.

Interrogative Pronous

Meaning	West (Adyghe)	East (Kabardian)
who	хэт	хэт
what / which	сыд	сыт
why	сыда	сыт щхьэкӀэ
where	тыдэ	дэнэ
how much	тхьапш	дапщэ
which one	тары	дэнэ
when	сыдигъу	сыт щыгъуэ

Examples:

West	хэт	къэкӀуагъэ?
East	хэт	къэкӀуар?
	who	came
"Who came?"

West	сыд	кӀалэм	ыцӀэ?
East	сыт	щӀалэм	и цӀэр?
	what	the boy	his name
"What is the boy's name?"

West	непэ	тыдэ	ущыӀэщт?
East	нобэ	дэнэ	ущыӀэну?
	today	where	you will be
"Today where will you be?"

== Indefinite pronouns ==
The main indefinite pronoun is someone/something.

Case	Singular		Plural	
Case	West	East	West	East
Absolutive	зыгорэ	зыгуэр	зыгорэхэр	зыгуэрхэр
Ergative	зыгорэм	зыгуэрым	зыгорэхэмэ	зыгуэрхэм
Instrumental	зыгорэ(м)кӀэ	зыгуэр(ым)кӀэ	зыгорэхэ(м)кӀэ	зыгуэрхэ(м)кӀэ

Examples:

West	зыгорэ	пчъэм	къытеуагъ
East	зыгуэр	бжэм	къытеуащ
	someone	door	knocked
"Someone has knocked the door."

West	кӀалэ горэм	бэнанэр	ешхы
East	щӀалэ гуэрым	бананэр	ешх
	some boy	banana	eats
"Some boy is eating the banana."

West	пшъэшъэ	дахэ горэм	мыр	къысиӀуагъ
East	пщащэ	дахэ гуэрым	мыр	къызжиӀащ
	girl	some pretty	this	(s)he told me
"Some pretty girl told me this."

== Indicatory pronouns ==
Indicatory pronouns are predicative forms used to say "It is X".

Meaning	West (Adyghe)		East (Kabardian)	
Meaning	Cyrillic	IPA	Cyrillic	IPA
it is me	сэры	[sarə]	сэращ	[saraːɕ]
it is you	оры	[warə]	уэращ	[waraːɕ]
it is him/her	ежьыр	[jaʑər]	аращ	[aːraːɕ]
it is us	тэры	[tarə]	дэращ	[daraːɕ]
it is you (pl)	шъоры	[ʃʷarə]	фэращ	[faraːɕ]
it is them	ежьхэр	[jaʑəxar]	ахэращ	[aːxaraːɕ]
that is it	ары	[aːrə]	аращ	[aːraːɕ]
this one is	мары	[maːrə]	мыращ	[məraːɕ]
that one is	моры	[morə]	моращ	[moraːɕ]
exactly that	джары	[d͡ʒaːrə]	аращ	[aːraːɕ]

Examples:

West	сэры	къэшъугъотын	фае
East	сэращ	фызылъыхъуэн	хуейр
	it is me	to find	necessary
"The one you must find is me."

West	ары	къысиӀуагъэ
East	аращ	къызжиӀар
	that is	what (s)he told me
"That is what he told me."

== Dialectal variations (Shapsug) ==
The Shapsug dialect of West Adyghe preserves specific demonstrative forms that differ from the standard literary language. These include the specific proximal дымы ("this one right here") and the specific distal дымо ("that one way over there").

Case	Specific Proximal (This here)		Specific Distal (That over there)	
Case	Cyrillic	IPA	Cyrillic	IPA
Singular
Absolutive	дымыр	[dəmər]	дымор	[dəmor]
Ergative	дымыщ	[dəməɕ]	дымощ	[dəmoɕ]
Instrumental	дымыщкӀэ	[dəməɕt͡ʃʼa]	дымощкӀэ	[dəmoɕt͡ʃʼa]
Adverbial	дымырэу	[dəməraw]	дыморэу	[dəmoraw]
Plural
Absolutive	дымыхэр	[dəməxar]	дымохэр	[dəmoxar]
Ergative	дымыхэмэ	[dəməxama]	дымохэмэ	[dəmoxama]
Instrumental	дымыхэмкӀэ	[dəməxamt͡ʃʼa]	дымохэмкӀэ	[dəmoxamt͡ʃʼa]
Adverbial	дымыхэрэу	[dəməxaraw]	дымохэрэу	[dəmoxaraw]

Dialectal Examples:

дымощ	ицуакъэ	ышъо	олъэгъуа?
[dəmoɕ	jət͡sʷaːqa	əʃʷa	waɬaʁʷaː]
that over there (erg.)	his shoe	its color	do you see it?
"Do you see the color of that person's shoe over there?"

дымор	кӀалэу	къысэуагъэр
[dəmor	t͡ʃʼaːɮaw	qəsawaːʁar]
that over there (abs.)	boy (adv.)	the one that hit me
"That is the boy that hit me over there."

Dialectal Indicatory Forms:

дыморы	кӀалэу	сфэсӀуагъэ
[dəmorə	t͡ʃaːlaw	səfasʔʷaːʁa]
that is over there	boy (adv.)	the one I talked about
"Over there is the boy I talked about."
