= Kfar Kama Adyghe dialect =

Dialect of Adyghe spoken in Kfar Kama

Kfar Kama dialect
- Native to: Israel
- Region: Kfar Kama
- Native speakers: 3,000
- Language family: Northwest Caucasian: Circassian; Adyghe; Black Sea coast dialects; Shapsug; Northern; Kfar Kama dialect

Language codes
- ISO 639-3: –
- Glottolog: None

Kfar Kama dialect (Adyghe: Кфар Камэм ишапсыгъэбзэ) is a subdialect of the Shapsug dialect of Adyghe spoken by the villagers of the village Kfar Kama in Israel.

== Phonology ==
The Kfar Kama dialect shares a large number of features with other Shapsug dialects such as dropping and not pronouncing н [n], м [m] and р [r] in some cases, and having the consonants сӀ [sʼ], гь [ɡʲ], кь [kʲ], кӀь [kʲʼ] and чъу [t͡ɕʷ] that correspond to цӀ [t͡sʼ], дж [d͡ʒ], ч [t͡ʃ], кӀ [t͡ʃʼ] and цу [t͡sʷ] in other Adyghe dialects (e.g. Abzakh, Temirgoy and Bzhedug). Also like other Shapsug dialects the Retroflex affricates consonants чъ [ʈʂ] and чӀ [ʈʂʼ] (that exist in Chemguy and Bzhedug dialects) became ч [t͡ʃ] and кӀ [t͡ʃʼ] in the Kfar Kama dialect. Unlike some other Shaspug dialects the Kfar Kama dialect does not have the aspirated consonants.

Meaning	Kfar Kama dialect		Other dialects	
Meaning	Cyrillic	IPA	Cyrillic	IPA
fast	псыкӀэ	psət͡ʃʼa	псынкӀэ	psənt͡ʃʼa
wide	шъуабгъо	ʃʷaːbʁʷa	шъуамбгъо	ʃʷaːmbʁʷa
corn	натыф	naːtəf	нартыф	naːrtəf
name	сӀэ	sʼa	цӀэ	t͡sʼa
shirt	гьанэ	ɡʲaːna	джанэ	d͡ʒaːna
chicken	кьэт	kʲat	чэты	t͡ʃatə
rope	кӀьапсэ	kʲʼaːpsa	кӀапсэ	t͡ʃʼaːpsa
shoe	чъуакъо	t͡ʃʷaːqʷa	цуакъэ	t͡sʷaːqa
to sleep	чыен	t͡ʃəjan	чъыен	ʈʂəjan
earth	кӀыгу	t͡ʃʼəɡʷ	чӀыгу	ʈʂʼəɡʷ

=== The consonant [h] ===
- This dialect has a voiceless glottal fricative [h] in some words that correspond to [d͡ʒ] in other diaelcts :

Meaning	Kfar Kama dialect	Other dialects
now	həgʲ	jəd͡ʒə
again	dahaza	
right now	hədadam	d͡ʒədadam

=== Uvular consonants ===
In some cases къ [q] and къу [qʷ] became хъ [χ] and хъу [χʷ] :

Word	Adyghe				Kabardian	
Word	Temirgoy		Kfar Kama dialect		Kabardian	
Word	IPA	Cyrillic	IPA	Cyrillic	IPA	Cyrillic
son	qʷa	къо	qʷa	къо	qʷa	къуэ
grave	qa	къэ	χa	хъэ	q͡χa	кхъэ
male	χʷə	хъу	χʷə	хъу	χʷə	хъу
pig	qʷa	къо	χʷa	хъо	q͡χʷa	кхъуэ
cheese	q͡ʷaːja	къуае	χʷaːja	хъуае	q͡χʷej	кхъуей
voice/sound	maːqa	макъэ	maːχa	махъэ	maːq	макъ
ship	qʷəħa	къухьэ	qʷaħ	къохь	q͡χʷəħ	кхъухь
peer	qʷəʐə	къужъы	qʷəʐə	къужъы	q͡χʷəʑə	кхъужьы
man	χʷəɬfəʁa	хъулъфыгъэ	qʷəlfəʁa	къулфыгъэ	χʷəɬxʷəʁa	хъулъхугъэ
ant	qaːmzaɡʷ	къамзэгу	χaːnzaɡʷ	хъанзэгу	χʷəmpʼat͡sʼad͡ʒ	хъумпӀэцӀэдж

== Grammar differences ==
=== Nouns ===
In the instrumental case the noun has the suffix -мгьэ (-mɡʲa) or -гьэ (-gʲa) unlike other dialects (e.g. Abzakh and Temirgoy) that has the suffix -мкIэ (-mt͡ʃa) or -кIэ (-t͡ʃa) :

- Kfar Kama dialect: КӀалэр Адыгэбзэгьэ мэгущаӀэ ↔ Standard: КӀалэр АдыгэбзэкӀэ мэгущаӀэ - "The boy speaks (using) Adyghe language".
- Kfar Kama dialect: Къэлэмымгьэ сэтхэ ↔ Standard: КъэлэмымкӀэ сэтхэ - "I write (using) with the pencil".

In the invertive case the noun has the suffix -ыу (-əw) unlike other dialects that has the suffix -эу (-aw) :

- Kfar Kama dialect: ЛӀыр баиу хъугъэ ↔ Standard: ЛӀыр баеу хъугъэ - "The man become rich".
- Kfar Kama dialect: Пшъашъэр нэхь даху къэлъагъо ↔ Standard: Пшъашъэр нахь дахэу къэлъагъо - "The girl looks more beautiful".
- Kfar Kama dialect: КӀалэр псыкӀыу мачъэ ↔ Standard: КӀалэр псынкӀэу мачъэ - "The boy runs quickly".

=== Future tense ===
In this dialect the verb has the suffix ~эт (~at) and in some cases ~ыт (~ət) unlike standard Adyghe (Temirgoy) that has the Suffix ~щт (~ɕt).

Word	Adyghe				Standart Kabardian	
Word	Standard Adyghe		Bzhedug and Shapsug		Standart Kabardian	
Word	IPA	Cyrillic	IPA	Cyrillic	IPA	Cyrillic
I will go	səkʷʼaɕt	сыкӀощт	səkʷʼat	сыкIот	səkʷʼanəwɕ	сыкӀуэнущ
you will go	wəkʷʼaɕt	укӀощт	wəkʷʼat	укIот	wəkʷʼanəwɕ	укӀуэнущ
he will go	makʷʼaɕt	мэкӀощт	makʷʼat	мэкIот	makʷʼanəwɕ	мэкӀуэнущ
we will go	təkʷʼaɕt	тыкӀощт	ʂʷəkʷʼat	тыкIот	dəkʷʼanəwɕ	дыкӀуэнущ
you (plural) will go	ʃʷəkʷaɕt	шъукӀощт	ʃʷəkʷʼat	шъукӀот	fəkʷʼanəwɕ	фыкӀуэнущ
they will go	maːkʷatəɕx	макӀощтых	makʷʼatəx	мэкӀотых	jaːkʷʼanəwɕ	якӀуэнущ

=== Big suffix -фэ ===
- The standard Adyghe's suffix -шхо /-ʃxʷa/, which means big or mighty, is -фэ /-fˠa/ in Kfar Kama dialect :

Meaning	Kfar Kama dialect		Other dialects	
Meaning	Cyrillic	IPA	Cyrillic	IPA
mighty God	тхьэфэ	tħafˠa	тхьэшхо	tħaʃxʷa
large house	унэфэ	wənafˠa	унэшхо	wənaʃxʷa

== Unique words ==
Meaning	Kfar Kama dialect		Standard Adyghe		Standard Kabardian	
Meaning	Cyrillic	IPA	Cyrillic	IPA	Cyrillic	IPA
what	лъэу	ɬaw	сыд	səd	сыд	səd
man	къулфыгъэ	qʷəlfəʁa	хъулъфыгъэ	χʷəɬfəʁa	хъулъхугъэ	χʷəɬxʷəʁa
few, bit	тэкӀу	takʷʼ	тӀэкӀу	tʼakʷʼ	тӀэкӀу	tʼakʷʼ
small	цыкӀу	t͡səkʷʼ	цӀыкӀу	t͡sʼəkʷʼ	цӀыкӀу	t͡sʼəkʷʼ
wall	къалэ	qaːla	дэпкъы	dapqə	дэпкъ	dapq
shoe	чъуакъо	t͡ʃʷaːqʷa	цуакъэ	t͡sʷaːqa	вакъэ	vaːqa
star	жъуагъэ	ʒʷaːʁa	жъуагъо	ʒʷaːʁʷa	вагъуэ	vaːʁʷa
tree	чъыг	t͡ɕəɣ	чъыгы	t͡ʂəɣə	жыг	ʒəɣ
cow	чэм	t͡ʃam	чэмы	t͡ʃamə	жэм	ʒam
night	чэщ	t͡ʃaɕ	чэщы	t͡ʃaɕə	жэщ	ʒaɕ
yard	щао	ɕaːwa	щагу	ɕaːɡʷə	-	-
poor	тхьамыщкӀь	tħaməɕkʲʼ	тхьамыкӀ	yħamət͡ʃʼ	тхьэмыщкӀэ	yħaməɕt͡ʃʼa
today	нэпэ	napa	непэ	najpa	нобэ	nawba
day after tomorrow	нэущымыщкӀь	nawɕəməɕkʲʼ	неущымыкӀ	nawɕəmət͡ʃʼ	?	?
big	фэ	fˠa	джадэ	d͡ʒaːda	?	?
worm	хьаблыу	ħaːbləw	хьамлыу	ħaːmɮəw	хьэмбылыу	ħambəɮəw
to dance	угьын	wəɡʲən	къэшъон	qaʃʷan	къэфэн	qafan
spider	багьэ	baːɡʲa	бэджы	bad͡ʒə	бэдж	bad͡ʒ
ant	хъанзэгу	χaːnzaɡʷ	къамзэгу	qːamzaɡʷ	хъумпӀэцӀэдж	χʷəmpʼat͡sʼad͡ʒ
cheese	хъуае	χʷaːja	къуае	qʷaːja	кхъуей	qχʷej
ship	къохь	qʷaħ	къухьэ	qʷəħa	кхъухь	qχʷəħ
voice, sound	махъэ	maːχa	макъэ	maːqa	макъ	maːq
pig	хъо	χʷa	къо	qʷa	кхъуэ	qχʷa
grave	хъэ	χa	къэ	qa	кхъэ	qχa
dog	хьэжъ	ħaʐ	хьэ	ħa	хьэ	ħa
to believe	шӀошӀун	ʃʷʼaʃʷʼən	шӀошъын	ʃʷʼaʂəm	фӀэщын	fʼaɕəm
blue	шъухъуатӀэ	ʃʷəχʷaːtʼa	шхъуантӀэ	ʃχʷaːntʼa	шхъуантӀэ	ʃχʷaːntʼa
pink	плъыжьгьэфы	pɬəʑɡʲafə	тхьэмбылышъу	tħambəɮəʃʷ	?	?
orange	гъожьыплъыжь	ʁʷaʑəpɬəʑ	гъоплъышъо	ʁʷapɬəʃʷa	?	?
brown	къэхьыуашъу	qaħəwaːʃʷ	етӀагъо	jatʼaːʁʷa	?	?
swing	кӀьэрхъон	kʲʼarχʷan	хъэрен	χarajn	?	?
frog	хьантыкъуакъу	ħaːntəqʷaːqʷ	хьантӀаркъу	ħaːntʼaːrqʷ	хьэндыркъуакъуэ	ħandərqʷaːqʷa
turtle	хьэнчэмыӀу	ħant͡ʃaməʔʷ	хьэдэпчэмыӀу	ħadapt͡ʃaməʔʷ	шылъэгу	ʃəɬaɡʷ
right (side)	жъабгъо	ʐaːbʁʷa	джабгъо	d͡ʒaːbʁʷa	ижь	jəʑ
to laugh at	шӀыгушӀкӀьын	ʃʼəɡʷəʃʼkʲʼən	дэхьащхын	daħaːɕxən	?	?
nothing	зиӀ	ziʔ	зыцый	zət͡səj	?	?
friend	гъусэ	ʁʷəsa	ныбджэгъу	nəbd͡ʒaʁʷ	ныбжьэгъу	nəbʑaʁʷ
king	парчъыхь	paːrt͡ʂəħ	пачъыхь	paːt͡ʂəħ	пащтыхь	paːɕtəħ
always	еныу	janəw	ренэу	rajnaw	рену	rajnəw

== See also ==
- Hakuchi Adyghe dialect
- Shapsug Adyghe dialect
- Abzakh Adyghe dialect
- Besleney dialect
- Bzhedug Adyghe Dialect
