= Hakuchey =

Circassian warrior clan

The Hakuchey or Hakuch (Adyghe: ХьакӀуцу [ħaːkʷʼɘt͡sʷ]) were a Circassian warrior clan who were mostly destroyed in the Circassian genocide and the Russo-Circassian War. The remaining adherents were assimilated into the Shapsug tribe. They used to speak Hakuchi, a sub-dialect of the Shapsug dialect of the western dialect of the Circassian language.

== History ==
The Hakuch led the longest resistance against the Russians in the Russo-Circassian War, not surrendering until 1870, and as a result were widely exterminated.

After defeat, the Hakuch moved to the mountains. The Commander-in-Chief of the Russian Caucasian Army, in his report dated 14 June 1865 to the Russian Ministry of War, stated that the Hakuchs preferred to die rather than leave their lands, and that they were fighting to the death by hiding their families and children in deserted and secluded corners and caves. The number of Hakuch rebels sheltering in the mountains was reported by another Russian commander as 8-9 thousand in June 1865. When the Hakuch realised they would lose, they would prefer mass suicide over being captured by Russians. They saw death as liberation and preferred it over life in captivity. Before going to battles they for sure knew they would lose, they took poison that would affect them in a matter of hours. This way, even if they tried to live and surrendered, they would die by poison.

The majority of the Hakuch died in battle or due to harsh conditions of the mountains, and by the end of the 19th century, only a few hundred were left. When it became clear that several hundred Hakuch could not pose a real threat to Russia, they were allowed to return to their homes. Nowadays, most of the Black Sea Circassians in the Caucasus are descendants of these Hakuch.
