= Hakuchi dialect =

Shapsug sub-dialect

Hakuchi
- Къарацхаибзэ
- Pronunciation: [qaːraːt͡sxaːjɘbzɐ]
- Native to: Turkey
- Ethnicity: Hakuchey
- Language family: Northwest Caucasian: Circassian; Adyghe; Black Sea coast dialects; Shapsug; Hakuchi

Language codes
- ISO 639-3: –
- Glottolog: xaku1238

Hakuchi (Adyghe: ХьакӀуцубзэ [ħaːkʷʼɘt͡sʷɘbzɐ] or Къарацхаибзэ [qaːraːt͡sxaːjɘbzɐ] in Hakuchi Adyghe) is a variety of the Shapsug sub-dialect of West Adyghe dialect of the Adyghe language spoken in Turkey. It is considered to be the most archaic variety of Adyghe.

Since the Hakuchi are considered an isolated Shapsug clan, their dialect differs little from that of the Shapsug dialect. It is also believed that the Hakuchis are a blend of various Circassian tribes: Shapsug, Ubykh, Abdzakh and others. This is why the Hakuchi dialect has some interesting phonetics in it.

== Phonology ==
The Hakuchi has an uvular ejective [qʼ] and a labialized uvular ejective [qʷʼ] that correspond to West Adyghe and Kabardian Adyghe glottal stop [ʔ] and labialized glottal stop [ʔʷ].

Word	Hakuchi dialect		Ubykh	West Adyghe		Kabardian	
Word	IPA	Cyrillic	Ubykh	IPA	Cyrillic	IPA	Cyrillic
two	[tʼqʷʼə]	тӀыкъӀу	tʼqʷʼɜ	[tʷʼə]	тӀу	[tʼəw]	тӀу
to say	[qʷʼan]	къӀон (къӀуэн)	qʼɜ	[ʔʷan]	Ӏон	[ʔʷan]	Ӏуэн
hand	[qʼa]	къӀэ	q'ɐp'ɜ	[ʔa]	Ӏэ	[ʔa]	Ӏэ
table	[qʼaːna]	къӀанэ	ʂɜ'nɨ	[ʔaːna]	Ӏанэ	[ʔana]	Ӏэнэ
hat	[paːqʷʼa]	пакъӀо (пакъӀуэ)	bˤɜ'qˤʼɨ	[paːʔʷa]	паӀо	[pəʔa]	пыIэ

== See also ==
- Ubykh language
- Circassian languages
  - Adyghe language
    - Abzakh Adyghe dialect
    - Bzhedug Adyghe dialect
    - Shapsug Adyghe dialect
      - Kfar Kama Adyghe dialect
  - Kabardian language
    - Besleney Kabardian dialect
