= Shapsug dialect =

Dialect of the Adyghe language

Shapsug
- шапсыгъабзэ
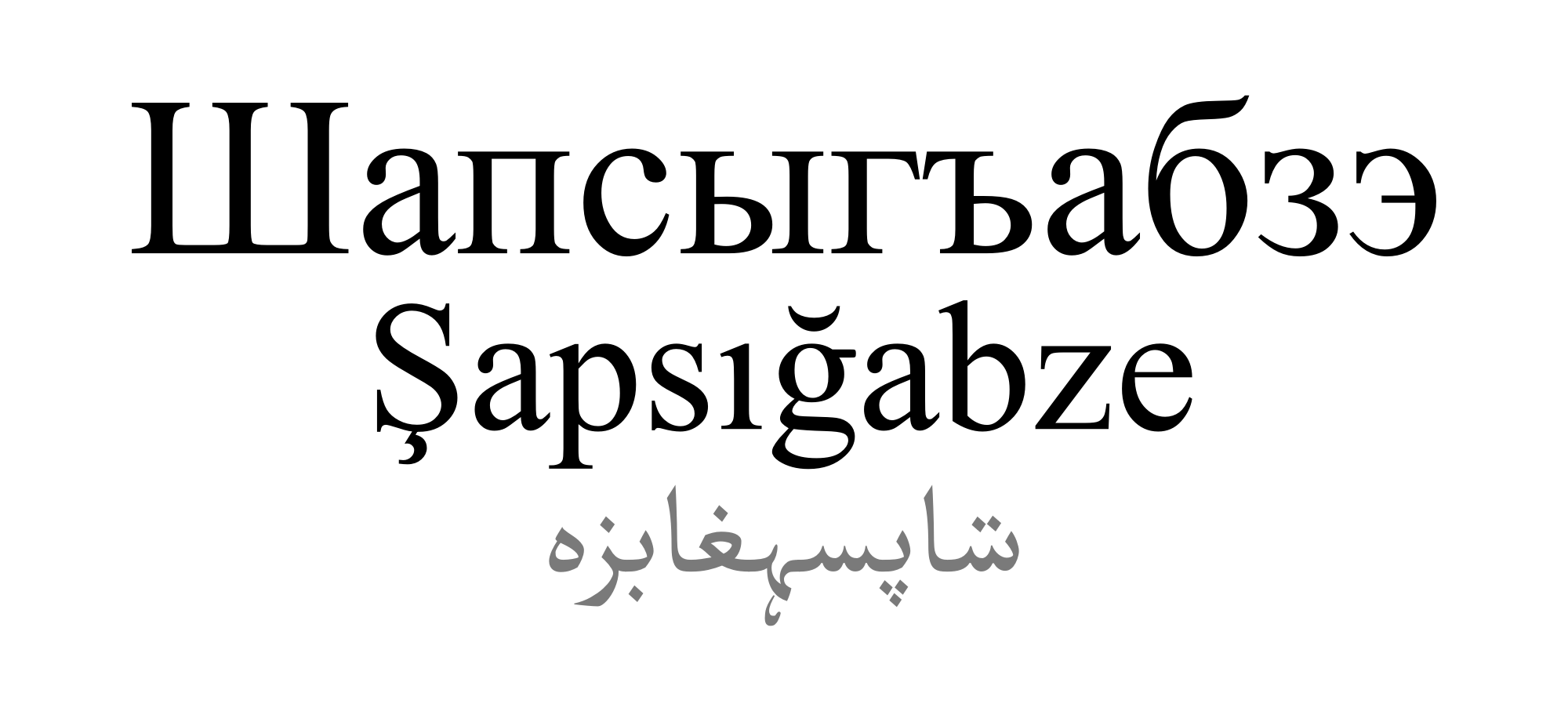
- "Shapsug dialect" written in the Cyrillic, the ABX Latin and the now-defunct Perso-Arabic scripts.
- Native to: Republic of Adygea, Turkey, Israel (Kfar Kama), Jordan
- Ethnicity: Shapsugs
- Native speakers: 14,000 (2010)
- Language family: Northwest Caucasian: Circassian; Adyghe; Black Sea coast dialects; Shapsug
- Writing system: Cyrillic script (historically)

Language codes
- ISO 639-3: –
- Glottolog: shap1240

The Shapsug dialect (Adyghe: Шапсыгъабзэ; Kabardian: Шапсыгъэбзэ) is a dialect of Adyghe. The Shapsug dialect is spoken by the Shapsugs, which are one of the largest Circassian population in the diaspora outside Republic of Adygea, alongside Abzakhs. The Shapsug dialect is very similar to the Natukhai dialect and together, they make the Black Sea coast dialects of Adyghe. The Shapsug dialect consists of three main sub dialects: Great Shapsug (North Shapsug), Small Shapsug (South Shapsug) and Hakuchi. The Shapsug dialect is best known as the dialect with palatalized velar stops.

== Subdialects ==
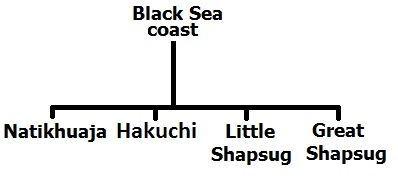
The black sea coast Adyghe dialects family tree.

- The Black Sea coast dialects
  - Natukhai dialect (Adyghe: НэтӀхъуаджэбзэ)
  - Shapsug dialect (Adyghe: Шапсыгъабзэ)
    - North Shapsugs, Great Shapsugs, Kuban Shapsugs dialect (Шапсыгъэ шху).
      - Kfar Kama dialect (Кфар Камэм ишапсыгъэбзэ): Shapsug dialect spoken by the villagers of Kfar Kama in Israel.
    - South Shapsugs, Small Shapsugs, Coastal Shapsugs Black Sea Shapsugs (Шапсыгъэ-цӀыкӀу) dialect.
  - Hakuchi dialect (ХьакӀуцубзэ, Къарацхаибзэ)

== Phonology ==
Note on Orthography: This article employs Cyrillic characters alongside IPA to assist readers familiar with the Circassian alphabet. However, standard Adyghe orthography contains inconsistencies; notably, the digraph кӀ represents the sound [t͡ʃʼ] despite visually suggesting a velar ejective [kʼ]. To ensure phonetic precision, this article utilizes the following distinctions: чӀ for [t͡ʃʼ], чӀъ for [ʈʂʼ], and кӀь for [kʲʼ].

Orthographic Convention
This article uses specific Cyrillic notation to resolve ambiguities in the standard alphabet:
чӀ	[t͡ʃʼ] (Standard кӀ)
чӀъ	[ʈʂʼ] (Retroflex)
кӀь	[kʲʼ] (Palatalized velar)

Consonants
		Labial	Alveolar				Postalveolar/Palatal				Velar			Uvular		Laryngeal	
		Labial	plain	lab.	sib.	lat.	plain	lab.	pal.	retro.	plain	lab.	pal.	plain	lab.	plain	lab.
Nasal		m м	n н														
Plosive/ Affricate	voiceless	p п	t т		t͡s ц		t͡ʃ ч	t͡ʃʷ цу				kʷ ку	kʲ кь	q къ	qʷ къу	ʔ Ӏ	ʔʷ Ӏу
Plosive/ Affricate	voiced	b б	d д		d͡z дз		d͡ʒ дж					ɡʷ гу	ɡʲ гь				
Plosive/ Affricate	ejective	pʼ пӀ	tʼ тӀ	tʷʼ тӀу	t͡sʼ цӀ		t͡ʃʼ чӀ					kʷʼ кӀу	kʲʼ кӀь				
Fricative	voiceless	f ф			s с	ɬ лъ	ʃ ш	ʃʷ шу	ɕ щ	ʂ шъ	x~h̪͆ х			χ хъ	χʷ хъу	ħ хь	
Fricative	voiced				z з		ʒ ж	ʒʷ жу	ʑ жь	ʐ жъ	ɣ г			ʁ гъ	ʁʷ гъу		
Fricative	ejective				sʼ сӀ	ɬʼ лӀ	ʃʼ шӀ	ʃʷʼ шӀу									
Sonorant			r р			l л			j й			w у					

=== Palatalized velar stops ===
In the Shapsug and Natukhai dialects there is a palatalized voiced velar stop [ɡʲ] ⟨гь⟩, a palatalized voiceless velar stop [kʲ] ⟨кь⟩ and a palatalized velar ejective [kʲʼ] ⟨кӀь⟩ that were merged with дж [d͡ʒ], ч [t͡ʃ] and кӀ [t͡ʃʼ] in most Adyghe dialects. The Shapsug dialect also has ч [t͡ʃ], дж [d͡ʒ] and кӀ [t͡ʃʼ] in words like чэмы "cow", джэмышх "spoon" and кӀалэ "boy".

- Shapsug гь [ɡʲ] became дж [d͡ʒ] in other dialects:

Meaning	Shapsug		Standard Adyghe		Kabardian	
Meaning	Cyrillic	IPA	Cyrillic	IPA	Cyrillic	IPA
shirt	гьанэ	ɡʲaːna	джанэ	dʒaːna	джанэ	dʒaːna
pants	гъошэгь	ʁʷaʃaɡʲ	гъончэдж	ʁʷant͡ʃad͡ʒ	гъуэншэдж	ʁʷanʃad͡ʒ
now	гьы	ɡʲə	джы	dʒə	джы	dʒə
fur coat	гьэдыгу	ɡʲadəɡʷ	джэдыгу	dʒadəɡʷ	джэдыгу	dʒadəɡʷ
to study to read	егьэн	jaɡʲan	еджэн	jadʒan	еджэн	jadʒan
game	гьэгу	ɡʲagʷ	джэгу	d͡ʒagʷ	джэгу	d͡ʒagʷ
bitter	дыгьы	dəɡʲə	дыджы	dəd͡ʒə	дыдж	dəd͡ʒ
sick	сымагьэ	səmaːɡʲa	сымаджэ	səmaːd͡ʒa	сымаджэ	səmaːd͡ʒa
bold	шъхьэгьашъо	ʂħaɡʲaːʃʷa	шъхьэджашъо	ʂħad͡ʒaːʃʷa		
evil	бзагьэ	bzaːɡʲa	бзаджэ	bzaːd͡ʒa	бзаджэ	bzaːd͡ʒa
that's it	гьары	ɡʲaːrə	джары	d͡ʒaːrə	джары	d͡ʒaːrə
noon	щэгьагъо	ɕaɡʲaːʁʷa	щэджагъо	ɕad͡ʒaːʁʷa	шэджагъуэ	ʃad͡ʒaːʁʷa
infidel	гьаур	ɡʲaːwər	джаур	d͡ʒaːwər	джаур	d͡ʒaːwər
to stand up	тэгьын	taɡʲən	тэджын	tad͡ʒən	тэджын	tad͡ʒən
dance	угь	wəɡʲ	удж	wəd͡ʒ	удж	wəd͡ʒ

- Shapsug кь [kʲ] became ч [t͡ʃ] in other dialects:

Meaning	Shapsug		Standard Adyghe		Kabardian	
Meaning	Cyrillic	IPA	Cyrillic	IPA	Cyrillic	IPA
sword	кьатэ	kʲaːta	чатэ	t͡ʃaːta	джатэ	d͡ʒaːta
barrel	пхъэкьай	pχapkʲaːj	пхъэчай	pχapt͡ʃaːj	чей	t͡ʃaj
throat	кьый	kʲəj	чый	t͡ʃəj	чий	t͡ʃəj
chicken	кьэт	kʲat	чэты	t͡ʃatə	джэд	d͡ʒad
chick	кьэтжъые	kʲatʐəja	чэтыжъые	t͡ʃatəʐəja	джэджьей	d͡ʒadʑej
cat	кьэтыу	kʲatəw	чэтыу	t͡ʃatəw	джэдыу	d͡ʒadəw
glass	апкь	ʔaːpkʲ	апч	ʔaːpt͡ʃ	абдж	ʔaːbd͡ʒ
brushwood	кьы	kʲə	чы	t͡ʃə	чы	t͡ʃə
crack	кьэ	kʲa	чэ	t͡ʃa	чэ	t͡ʃa
to crack	кьэн	kʲən	чэн	t͡ʃən	чэн	t͡ʃən
shop	тукьан	təkʲaːn	тучан	tət͡ʃaːn	тучан	tət͡ʃaːn
goatling	кьэцӀы	kʲat͡sʼə	чэцӀы	t͡ʃat͡sʼə		
gate	кьэупчъ	kʲawəpt͡ɕ	чэупчъ	t͡ʃawəpt͡ʂ	чоубжэ	t͡ʃawbdʒa
marriage	нэкьыхь	nakʲəħ	нэчыхь	nat͡ʃəħ	нэчыхь	nat͡ʃəħ
cheerful	кьэфы	kʲafə	чэфы	t͡ʃafə	джэху	d͡ʒaxʷ
hovel	кьыл	kʲəl	чыл	t͡ʃəɮ	чыл	t͡ʃəɮ
humming top	кьынэ	kʲəna	чынэ	t͡ʃəna	чын	t͡ʃən
to spin	гъэкьэрэзын	ʁakʲarazən	гъэчэрэзын	ʁat͡ʃrazən	гъэджэрэзын	ʁad͡ʒarazən
to pick (fruit)	пыкьын	pəkʲən	пычын	pət͡ʃən	пычын	pət͡ʃən
to tear (paper)	кьэтхъэн	kʲatχan	чэтхъэн	t͡ʃatχan	зэфӀэтхъын	zafʼatχən

- Shapsug кӀь [kʲʼ] became кӀ [t͡ʃʼ] in other dialects:

Meaning	Shapsug		Standard Adyghe		Kabardian	
Meaning	Cyrillic	IPA	Cyrillic	IPA	Cyrillic	IPA
tail	кӀьэ	kʲʼa	кӀэ	t͡ʃʼa	кӀэ	t͡ʃʼa
egg	кӀьакӀьэ	kʲʼaːkʲʼa	кӀэнкӀэ	t͡ʃʼant͡ʃʼa	джэдыкӀэ	d͡ʒadət͡ʃʼa
skirt	кӀьэпхын	kʲʼapxən	кӀэпхын	t͡ʃʼapxən	кӀэпхын	t͡ʃʼapxən
Temirgoy	кӀьэмгуе	kʲʼamɡʷəja	кӀэмгуе	t͡ʃʼamɡʷəja	кӀэмгуе	t͡ʃʼamɡʷəja
smithy	кӀьыщ	kʲʼəɕ	кӀыщ	t͡ʃʼəɕ	кӀыщ	t͡ʃʼəɕ
ceiling	кӀьашъо	kʲʼaːʃʷa	кӀашъо	t͡ʃʼaːʃʷa	кӀафэ	t͡ʃʼaːfa
rope	кӀьапсэ	kʲʼaːpsa	кӀапсэ	t͡ʃʼaːpsa	кӀапсэ	t͡ʃʼaːpsa
edge	цакӀьэ	t͡saːkʲʼa	цакӀэ	t͡saːt͡ʃʼa	дзакӀэ	d͡zaːt͡ʃʼa
to scream	кӀьыин	kʲʼəjən	кӀыин	t͡ʃʼəjən	кӀыин	t͡ʃʼəjən
gun	кӀьэрахъо	kʲʼaraːχʷa	кӀэрахъо	t͡ʃʼaraːχʷa	кӀэрахъуэ	t͡ʃʼaraːχʷa
long	кӀьэхьы	kʲʼaħə	кӀыхьэ	t͡ʃʼəħa	кӀыхь	t͡ʃʼəħ
short	кӀьако	kʲʼaːkʷa	кӀако	t͡ʃʼaːkʷa	кӀагуэ	t͡ʃʼaːɡʷa
to kill	укӀьын	wkʲʼən	укӀын	wt͡ʃʼən	укӀын	wt͡ʃʼən
to move away	ӀукӀьын	ʔʷəkʲʼən	ӀукӀын	ʔʷət͡ʃʼən	ӀукӀын	ʔʷət͡ʃʼən
key	ӀукӀьыбзэ	ʔʷəkʲʼəbza	ӀункӀыбзэ	ʔʷənt͡ʃʼəbza	ӀункӀыбз	ʔʷənt͡ʃʼəbz
day after tomorrow	нэущымыщкӀь	nawɕəməʃkʲʼ	неущымыкӀ	najwɕəmət͡ʃʼ	пщэдей	pɕadaj
to wink	енэкӀьэон	janakʲʼawan	енэкӀэон	janat͡ʃʼawan	енэкӀэуэн	janat͡ʃʼawan
beard	жакӀьэ	ʒaːkʲʼa	жакӀэ	ʒaːt͡ʃʼa	жьакӀэ	ʑaːt͡ʃʼa
poor	тхьэмыщкӀь	tħaməɕkʲʼ	тхьамыкӀ	tħaːmət͡ʃʼ	тхьэмыщкӀэ	tħaməɕt͡ʃʼa
to be ashamed	укӀьытэн	wəkʲʼətan	укӀытэн	wət͡ʃʼətan	укӀытэн	wət͡ʃʼətan

=== Retroflex affricates ===
The retroflex affricate consonants чъ [ʈʂ] and чӀ [ʈʂʼ] (that exist in Chemguy and Bzhedug dialects) merged with the palato-alveolar affricate consonants ч [t͡ʃ] and кӀ [t͡ʃʼ] in the Shapsug and Natukhai dialects.

- Chemguy чъ [ʈʂ] became ч [t͡ʃ] in Shapsug :

Meaning	Shapsug		Standard Adyghe		Kabardian	
Meaning	Cyrillic	IPA	Cyrillic	IPA	Cyrillic	IPA
tree	чыг	t͡ʃəɣ	чъыгы	ʈʂəɣə	жыг	ʒəɣ
to sleep	чыен	t͡ʃəjan	чъыен	ʈʂəjan	жыен	ʒəjan
cold	чыӀэ	t͡ʃəʔa	чъыӀэ	ʈʂəʔa	щӀыӀэ	ɕʼəʔa
to run	чэн	t͡ʃan	чъэн	ʈʂan	жэн	ʒan
to run down	ечэхын	jat͡ʃaxən	ечъэхын	jaʈʂaxən	ежэхын	jaʒaxən
goat	ачэ	aːt͡ʃa	ачъэ	aːʈʂa	ажэ	aːʒa
number	пчагъэ	pt͡ʃaːʁa	пчъагъэ	pʈʂaːʁa	бжагъэ	bʒaːʁa
door	пчэ	pt͡ʃa	пчъэ	pʈʂa	бжэ	bʒa
door handle	пчэпсы	pt͡ʃapsə	пчъэпсы	pʈʂapsə	бжэпсы	bʒapsə

- Chemguy чӀ [ʈʂʼ] became кӀ [t͡ʃʼ] in Shapsug :

Meaning	Shapsug		Standard Adyghe		Kabardian	
Meaning	Cyrillic	IPA	Cyrillic	IPA	Cyrillic	IPA
stands under	чӀэт	t͡ʃʼat	чӀъэт	ʈʂʼat	щӀэт	ɕʼat
sits under	чӀэс	t͡ʃʼas	чӀъэс	ʈʂʼas	щӀэс	ɕʼas
lies under	чӀэлъ	t͡ʃʼaɬ	чӀъэлъ	ʈʂʼaɬ	щӀэлъ	ɕʼaɬ
area	чӀыпӀэ	t͡ʃʼəpʼa	чӀъыпӀэ	ʈʂʼəpʼa	щӀыпӀэ	ɕʼəpʼa
debt	чӀыфэ	t͡ʃʼəfa	чӀъыфэ	ʈʂʼəfa	щӀыхуэ	ɕʼəxʷa
earth	чӀыгу	t͡ʃʼəɡʷ	чӀъыгу	ʈʂʼəɡʷ	щӀыгу	ɕʼəɡʷ
bottom	чӀэ	t͡ʃʼa	чӀъэ	ʈʂʼa	щӀэ	ɕʼa
strong, force	кӀуачӀэ	kʷʼaːt͡ʃʼa	кӀуачӀъэ	kʷʼaːʈʂʼa	кӀуащӀэ	kʷʼaːɕʼa
iron	гъучӀы	ʁʷət͡ʃʼə	гъучӀъы	ʁʷəʈʂʼə	гъущӀы	ʁʷəɕʼы
daw	къуачӀэ	qʷaːt͡ʃʼa	къуанчӀъэ	qʷaːnʈʂʼa	къуанщӀэ	qʷaːnɕʼa
bumblebee	чӀыбжь	t͡ʃʼəbʑ	чӀъыбжь	ʈʂʼəbʑ	щӀыбжь	ɕʼəbʑ
badger	чӀыкъо	t͡ʃʼəqʷa	чӀъыкъу	ʈʂʼəqʷ	щӀыкъу	ɕʼəqʷ
dark	чӀапсӀэ	t͡ʃʼaːpsʼa	чӀъапцӀэ	ʈʂʼaːpt͡sʼa	щӀапцӀэ	ɕʼaːpt͡sʼa
to ask	упчӀэн	wəpt͡ʃʼan	упчӀъэн	wəpʈʂʼan	упщӀэн	wəpɕʼan
gem, jewel	мычӀы	mət͡ʃʼə	мычӀъы	məʈʂʼə	мыщӀы	məɕʼə
clew	хъучӀанэ	χʷət͡ʃʼaːna	хъучӀъанэ	χʷəʈʂʼaːna	хъущӀанэ	χʷəɕʼaːna
to bury	чӀэтӀэн	t͡ʃʼatʼan	чӀъэтӀэн	ʈʂʼatʼan	щӀэтӀэн	ɕʼatʼan

=== Dropped consonants ===
In the Great Shapsug dialect (Like Bzhedug dialect) in some cases the consonants н [n], м [m] and р [r] are dropped and are not pronounced.

- The consonant м [m] is dropped before bilabial stops б [b], п [p], пӀ [pʼ] :

Meaning	Shapsug		Standard Adyghe		Kabardian	
Meaning	Cyrillic	IPA	Cyrillic	IPA	Cyrillic	IPA
calm	сабыр	saːbər	самбыр	saːmbər	самбыр	saːmbər
Saturday	шэбэт	ʃabat	шэмбэт	ʃambat	щэбэт	ɕabat
finger	Ӏэпхъабэ	ʔapχaːba	Ӏэхъуамбэ	ʔaχʷaːmba	Ӏэпхъуамбэ	ʔapχʷaːmba
toe	лъэпхъабэ	ɬapχaːba	лъэхъуамбэ	ɬaχʷaːmba	лъэпхъуамбэ	ɬapχʷaːmba
wide	шъуабгъо	ʃʷaːbʁʷa	шъуамбгъо	ʃʷaːmbʁʷa	фабгъуэ	faːbʁʷa
peel	шъуапӀэ	ʃʷaːpʼa	шъуампӀэ	ʃʷaːmpʼa	фампӀэ	faːmpʼa
board	пхъэбгъу	pχabʁʷ	пхъэмбгъу	pχambʁʷ	пхъэбгъу	pχabʁʷ
worm	хьэблыу	ħabləw	хьамлыу	ħaːmɮəw	хьэмбылыу	ħambəɮəw

- The consonant н [n] is dropped before postalveolar affricates дж [d͡ʒ], ч [t͡ʃ], кӀ [t͡ʃʼ] and before alveolar stops д [d], т [t], тӀ [tʼ] :

Meaning	Shapsug		Standard Adyghe		Kabardian	
Meaning	Cyrillic	IPA	Cyrillic	IPA	Cyrillic	IPA
egg	кӀьакӀьэ	kʲʼaːkʲʼa	кӀэнкӀэ	t͡ʃant͡ʃa	джэдыкӀэ	d͡ʒadət͡ʃʼa
sweat	пкӀатӀэ	pt͡ʃʼaːtʼa	пкӀантӀэ	pt͡ʃʼaːntʼa	пщӀантӀэ	pɕʼaːntʼa
broom	пхъэкӀыпхъэ	pχat͡ʃʼəpχa	пхъэнкӀыпхъэ	pχant͡ʃʼəpχa	жыхапхъэ	ʒəxaːpχa
mud	псыжъы	psəʐə	псынжъы	psənʐə		
flue pipe	оджэкъ	wad͡ʒaq	онджэкъ	wand͡ʒaq		
rice	пыдж	pəd͡ʒ	пындж	pənd͡ʒ	пынжь	pənʑ
pillow	шъхьатэ	ʂħaːta	шъхьантэ	ʂħaːnta	щхьэнтэ	ɕħanta
bean	гьэч	ɡʲat͡ʃ	джэнчы	d͡ʒant͡ʃə	джэш	d͡ʒaʃ
pants	гъочэгь	ʁʷaʃaɡʲ	гъончэдж	ʁʷant͡ʃad͡ʒ	гъуэншэдж	ʁʷanʃad͡ʒ
fast	псыкӀэ	psət͡ʃʼa	псынкӀэ	psənt͡ʃʼa	псынщӀэ	psənɕʼa
shovel	хьацэ	ħaːt͡sa	хьанцэ	ħaːnt͡sa	хьэнцэ	ħant͡sa
blue	шъухъуатӀэ	ʃʷχʷaːtʼa	шхъуантӀэ	ʃχʷaːntʼa	шхъуантӀэ	ʃχʷaːntʼa
key	ӀукӀьыбзэ	ʔʷəkʲʼəbza	ӀункӀыбзэ	ʔʷənt͡ʃəbza	ӀункӀыбзэ	ʔʷənt͡ʃəbza
vein	лъытфэ	ɬətfa	лъынтфэ	ɬəntfa	лъынтхуэ	ɬəntxʷa
heavy	отэгъу	wataʁʷ	онтэгъу	wantaʁʷ	уэндэгъу	wandaʁʷ
knee	лъэгуаджэ	ɬaɡʷaːd͡ʒa	лъэгуанджэ	ɬaɡʷaːnd͡ʒa	лъэгуажьэ	ɬaɡʷaːʑa
butterfly	хьэтӀрэпӀый	ħatˈrapˈəj	хьампIырашъу^{1}	ħampˈəraːʃʷ	хьэндырабгъуэ	ħandəraːbʁʷa
noise	жъот	ʒʷat	жъонт	ʒʷant		
peanuts	чӀыдэ	t͡ʃʼəda	чӀындэ	t͡ʃʼənda	щӀыдэ	ɕʼəda
wrong	пхэдж	pxad͡ʒ	пхэндж	pxand͡ʒ	пхэнж	pxandʒ
chair	пхъэтӀэкӀу	pχatʼakʷʼ	пхъэнтӀэкӀу	pχantʼakʷʼ	пхъэнтӀэкӀу	pχantʼakʷʼ
slim	гъолагъэ	ʁʷalaːʁa	гъонлагъэ	ʁʷanɮaːʁa	-	-
to crawl	цӀэлъэн	t͡sʼaɬan	цӀэнлъэн	t͡sʼanɬan	-	-
to loose	лэлэн	ɮaɮan	лэнлэн	ɮanɮan	лэлэн	ɮaɮan
to spit	ужъутхэн	wəʒʷətxan	ужъунтхэн	wəʒʷəntxan	убжьытхэн	wəbʑətxan
to load	узэдын	wəzadən	узэндын	wəzandən	узэдын	wəzadən
glue	пцатхьэ	pt͡saːtħa	пцантхьэ	pt͡saːntħa	-	-

Notes:

^1In other Adyghe dialects (ex. Abzakh), it is хьантIрэпIий or хьантIэрэпIий which is much similar to the Shapsug word.

- The consonant р [r] is dropped before a voiceless alveolar stop т [t] :

Meaning	Shapsug		Standard Adyghe		Kabardian	
Meaning	Cyrillic	IPA	Cyrillic	IPA	Cyrillic	IPA
corn	натыф	naːtəf	натрыф	naːtrəf	нартыху	naːrtəxʷ
Nart	нат	naːt	нарт	naːrt	нарт	naːrt
gender	фыкъо	fəqʷa	фыркъо	fərqʷa	хукхъуэ	xʷərqχʷa
marj	мадж	maːd͡ʒ	мардж	maːrd͡ʒ	марж	maːrʒ
to crush	пӀытӀын	pʼətʼən	пӀыртӀын	pʼərtʼən		
to ripen	тӀыгъон	tʼəʁʷan	тӀыргъон	tʼərʁʷan	тӀыгъуэн	tʼəʁʷan
frog	хьантӀыкъуакъу	ħaːntʼəqʷaːqʷ	хьантӀаркъу^{2}	ħaːntʼarqʷ	хьэндыркъуакъуэ	ħandərqʷaːqʷa
scar	тыкъо	təqʷa	тыркъо	tərqʷa	дыркъуэ	dərqʷa

Notes:

^1In other Adyghe dialects (ex. Abzakh), it is хьантӀыркъуакъу which is much similar to the Shapsug and Kabardian word. In the Shapsug variant, the consonant р [r] is dropped.

=== Aspirated consonants ===
The aspirated consonants originally existed in the Proto-Circassian language, which maintained a strict distinction between aspirated and tense variants of voiceless consonants. While these sounds were lost or shifted in most modern dialects, they successfully survived in the Shapsug, Bzhedug, and Hatuqay dialects.

In these dialects, there exists a series of aspirated consonants (/pʰ/ /tʰ/ /ʃʰ/ /t͡sʰ/ /t͡ʃʰ/ /t͡ʂʰ/ /t͡ɕʷʰ/ /kʲʰ/ /kʷʰ/ /qʰ/ /qʷʰ/) that became plain consonants in other dialects:

- Shapsug, Bzhedug & Hatuqay пʰ [pʰ] ↔ п [p] in other dialects :

Word	Adyghe (West Circassian)		Kabardian (East Circassian)
Word	Shapsug, Bzhedug & Hatuqay	Chemguy & Literary Standard and Abzakh	Kabardian (East Circassian)
sharp	пʰапцӏэ [pʰaːpt͡sʼa]	папцӏэ [paːpt͡sʼa]	папцӏэ [paːpsʼa / paːpt͡sʼa]
arrogant	пʰагэ [pʰaːɣa]	пагэ [paːɣa]	пагэ [paːɣa]
nose	пʰэ [pʰa]	пэ [pa]	пэ [pa]

- Shapsug, Bzhedug & Hatuqay тʰ [tʰ] ↔ т [t] in other dialects :

Word	Adyghe (West Circassian)		Kabardian (East Circassian)
Word	Shapsug, Bzhedug & Hatuqay	Chemguy & Literary Standard and Abzakh	Kabardian (East Circassian)
respect	пхъатʰэ [pχaːtʰa]	пхъатэ [pχaːta]	-
to give	етʰын [jatʰən]	етын [jatən]	етын [jatən]
to take	штʰэн [ʃtʰan]	штэн [ʃtan]	щтэн [ɕtan]
on	тʰет [tʰajt]	тет [tajt]	тет [tat]
smooth	цӏашъутʰэ [t͡sʼaːʂʷtʰa]	цӏашъутэ [t͡sʼaːʃʷta]	цӏафтэ [t͡sʼaːfta]
to afraid	щтʰэн [ɕtʰan]	щтэн [ɕtan]	щтэн [ɕtan]
pillow	шъхьантʰэ [ʂħaːntʰa]	шъхьантэ [ʂħaːnta]	щхьатэ [ɕħaːta]

- Shapsug, Bzhedug & Hatuqay цʰ [t͡sʰ] ↔ ц [t͡s] in other dialects :

Word	Adyghe (West Circassian)		Kabardian (East Circassian)
Word	Shapsug, Bzhedug & Hatuqay	Chemguy & Literary Standard and Abzakh	Kabardian (East Circassian)
wool	цʰы [t͡sʰə]	цы [t͡sə]	цы [t͡sə]
eyelash	нэбзыцʰ [nabzət͡sʰ]	нэбзыц [nabzət͡s]	-

- Shapsug, Bzhedug & Hatuqay шʰ [ʃʰ] ↔ щ [ɕ] in other Adyghe dialects :

Word	Adyghe (West Circassian)		Kabardian (East Circassian)
Word	Shapsug, Bzhedug & Hatuqay	Chemguy & Literary Standard and Abzakh	Kabardian (East Circassian)
milk	шʰэ [ʃʰa]	щэ [ɕa]	шэ [ʃa]
lame	лъашʰэ [ɬaːʃʰa]	лъащэ [ɬaːɕa]	лъашэ [ɬaːʃa]
salt	шʰыгъу [ʃʰəʁʷ]	щыгъу [ɕəʁʷ]	шыгъу [ʃəʁʷ]
cloud	пшʰэ [pʃʰa]	пщэ [pɕa]	пшэ [pʃa]
pus	шʰыны [ʃʰənə]	щыны [ɕənə]	шын [ʃən]
accordion	пшʰынэ [pʃʰəna]	пщынэ [pɕəna]	пшынэ [pʃəna]
fat	пшʰэры [pʃʰarə]	пщэры [pɕarə]	пшэр [pʃar]
wax	шʰэфы [ʃʰafə]	шэфы [ʃafə]	шэху [ʃaxʷə]
horse	шʰы [ʃʰə]	шы [ʃə]	шы [ʃə]
sand	пшʰахъо [pʃʰaːχʷa]	пшахъо [pʃaːχʷa]	пшахъуэ [pʃaːχʷa]
story	пшʰысэ [pʃʰəsa]	пшысэ [pʃəsa]	пшысэ [pʃəsa]

- Shapsug кьʰ [kʲʰ] ↔ ч [t͡ʃ] in other dialects (чʰ [t͡ʃʰ] in Bzhedug & Hatuqay) :

Word	Adyghe (West Circassian)			Kabardian (East Circassian)
Word	Shapsug	Bzhedug & Hatuqay	Chemguy & Literary Standard and Abzakh	Kabardian (East Circassian)
spleen	кьʰэ [kʲʰa]	чʰэ [t͡ʃʰa]	чэ [t͡ʃa]	чэ [t͡ʃa]
brushwood twig	кьʰы [kʲʰə]	чʰы [t͡ʃʰə]	чы [t͡ʃə]	чы [t͡ʃə]
to cough	пскьʰэн [pskʲʰan]	псчʰэн [pst͡ʃʰan]	псчэн [pst͡ʃan]	псчэн [pst͡ʃan]

- Shapsug, Bzhedug & Hatuqay кʰу [kʷʰ] ↔ ку [kʷ] in other dialects :

Word	Adyghe (West Circassian)		Kabardian (East Circassian)
Word	Shapsug, Bzhedug & Hatuqay	Chemguy & Literary Standard and Abzakh	Kabardian (East Circassian)
middle	кʰу [kʷʰə]	ку [kʷə]	ку [kʷə]
thigh	кʰо [kʷʰa]	ко [kʷa]	куэ [kʷa]

- Shapsug, Bzhedug & Hatuqay къʰ [qʰ] ↔ къ [q] in other Adyghe dialects. Note: In many Shapsug dialects (such as Kfar Kama), this became the fricative хъ [χ], while in Natukhai and Hatuqay it became the affricate кхъ [q͡χ].

Word	Adyghe (West Circassian)				Kabardian (East Circassian)
Word	Shapsug & Bzhedug	Other Shapsug dialects (like Kfar Kama)	Natukhaj & Hatuqay	Chemguy & Literary Standard and Abzakh	Kabardian (East Circassian)
grave	къʰэ [qʰa]	хъэ [χa]	кхъэ [q͡χa]	къэ [qa]	кхъэ [q͡χa]

- Shapsug, Bzhedug & Hatuqay къуʰ [qʷʰ] ↔ къу [qʷ] in other Adyghe dialects. Note: In Shapsug dialects, this became хъу [χʷ], while in Natukhai and Hatuqay it became кхъу [q͡χʷ].

Word	Adyghe (West Circassian)				Kabardian (East Circassian)
Word	Shapsug & Bzhedug	Other Shapsug dialects (like Kfar Kama)	Natukhaj & Hatuqay	Chemguy & Literary Standard and Abzakh	Kabardian (East Circassian)
pig	къʰо [qʷʰa]	хъо [χʷa]	кхъо [q͡χʷa]	къо [qʷa]	кхъуэ [q͡χʷa]
cheese	къʰуае [qʷʰaːja]	хъуае [χʷaːja]	кхъуае [q͡χʷaːja]	къуае [qʷaːja]	кхъуей [q͡χʷaj]
ship	къʰохь [qʷʰaħ]	хъохь [χʷaħ]	-	къухьэ [qʷəħa]	кхъухь [q͡χʷəħ]
to fart	къэкъʰун [qaqʷʰəʃʷən]	къэхъушъун [qʷaχʷəʃʷən]	-	къэкъушъун [qʷaqʷəʃʷən]	къэцыфын [qat͡səfən]
peer	къʰужъы [qʷʰəʐə]	къужъы [qʷəʐə]	-	къужъы [qʷəʐə]	кхъужьы [q͡χʷəʑə]

- Shapsug, Bzhedug & Hatuqay чъʰу [t͡ɕʷʰ] ↔ чу [t͡ʃʷ] (spelled цу) in Temirgoy:

Word	Adyghe (West Circassian)		Kabardian (East Circassian)
Word	Shapsug, Bzhedug & Hatuqay	Chemguy & Literary Standard	Kabardian (East Circassian)
jungle/bushy area	чъʰуны [t͡ɕʷʰənə]	цуны [t͡ʃʷənə]	фын [fən]

In Proto-Circassian, there was a clear distinction between aspirated and tense variants of voiceless consonants. The tense variants survived in western dialects like Shapsug, Hatuqay, Bzhedug, and Chemguy (Temirgoy). In linguistics literature, these tense consonants are often represented with a colon (e.g., tː) to denote gemination/tenseness, and in some Cyrillic orthographies, they are represented with double letters (e.g., пп, тт, цц) or with a colon (e.g., п:, т:, ц:).

In the eastern dialects (Besleney and Kabardian), the tense variants shifted and became voiced.

- pː ⟨п: / пп⟩ → b ⟨б⟩
- tː ⟨т: / тт⟩ → d ⟨д⟩
- t͡sː ⟨ц: / цц⟩ → d͡z ⟨дз⟩
- t͡ɕːʷ ⟨цу: / цуцу⟩ → v ⟨в⟩
- kːʲ ⟨кь: / кькь⟩ → ɡʲ ⟨гь⟩ / d͡ʒ ⟨дж⟩
- kːʷ ⟨ку: / куку⟩ → ɡʷ ⟨гу⟩
- t͡ʃː ⟨ч: / чч⟩ → d͡ʒ ⟨дж⟩ / ʒ ⟨ж⟩
- t͡ʂː ⟨чъ: / чъчъ⟩ → d͡ʐ ⟨джъ⟩ / ʒ ⟨ж⟩

Word	Proto-Circassian	Adyghe (West Circassian)		Kabardian (East Circassian)	
Word	Proto-Circassian	Shapsug	Bzhedug, Hatuqay, Chemguy & Literary Standard	Besleney	Standard Kabardian
Shift: tː → d
we	т:э [tːa]	т:э [tːa]	т:э [tːa]	дэ [da]	дэ [da]
leader	тхьэмат:э [tħamaːtːa]	тхьэмат:э [tħamaːtːa]	тхьэмат:э [tħamaːtːa]	тхьэмадэ [tħamaːda]	тхьэмадэ [tħamaːda]
Shift: t͡sː → d͡z
fish	пц:эжъые [pt͡sːaʐəja]	пц:эжъые [pt͡sːaʐəja]	пц:эжъые [pt͡sːaʐəja]	бдзэжьей [bd͡zaʑej]	бдзэжьей [bd͡zaʑej]
mouse	ц:ыгъо [t͡sːəʁʷa]	ц:ыгъо [t͡sːəʁʷa]	ц:ыгъо [t͡sːəʁʷa]	дзыгъуэ [d͡zəʁʷa]	дзыгъуэ [d͡zəʁʷa]
Shift: kːʲ → ɡʲ / d͡ʒ
glass	апкь: [aːpkːʲ]	апкь: [aːpkːʲ]	апч: [aːpt͡ʃː]	абгь [ʔaːbɡʲ]	абдж [ʔaːbd͡ʒ]
chicken	кь:эт [kːʲat]	кь:эт [kːʲat]	ч:эты [t͡ʃːatə]	гьэд [ɡʲad]	джэд [d͡ʒad]
Shift: t͡ʃː → d͡ʒ / ʒ
night	ч:эщ [t͡ʃːaɕ]	ч:эщы [t͡ʃːaɕə]	ч:эщы [t͡ʃːaɕə]	джэщ [d͡ʒaɕ]	жэщ [ʒaɕ]
village	ч:ылэ [t͡ʃːəɮa]	ч:ылэ [t͡ʃːəɮa]	ч:ылэ [t͡ʃːəɮa]	джылэ [d͡ʒəɮa]	жылэ [ʒəɮa]
cow	ч:эм [t͡ʃːam]	ч:эмы [t͡ʃːamə]	ч:эмы [t͡ʃːamə]	джэм [d͡ʒam]	жэм [ʒam]
Shift: t͡ʂː → d͡ʐ / ʒ
tree	чъ:ыг [t͡ʂːəɣ]	чъ:ыгы [t͡ʂːəɣə]	чъ:ыгы [t͡ʂːəɣə]	джъыг [d͡ʐəɣ]	жыг [ʒəɣ]
Shift: kːʷ → ɡʷ
short	кӏьак:о [kʲʼaːkːʷa]	кӏьак:о [kʲʼaːkːʷa]	кӏак:о [t͡ʃʼaːkːʷa]	кӏьагуэ [kʲʼaːɡʷa]	кӏагуэ [t͡ʃʼaːɡʷa]
wheat	к:оц [kːʷat͡s]	к:оцы [kːʷat͡sə]	к:оцы [kːʷat͡sə]	гуэдз [ɡʷad͡z]	гуэдз [ɡʷad͡z]

=== Others ===
In some Shapsug and Natukhai dialects there exist an alveolar ejective fricative [sʼ] ⟨сӀ⟩ that correspond to [t͡sʼ] ⟨цӀ⟩ in other dialects such as Abzakh, Bzhedug, Temirgoy, and Kabardian.

- Shapsug сӀ [sʼ] ↔ цӀ [t͡sʼ] in other dialects:

Meaning	Shapsug		Standard Adyghe		Kabardian	
Meaning	Cyrillic	IPA	Cyrillic	IPA	Cyrillic	IPA
name	сӀэ	sʼa	цӀэ	t͡sʼa	цӀэ	t͡sʼa
lie	псӀы	psʼə	пцӀы	pt͡sʼə	пцӀы	pt͡sʼə
black	шӀусӀэ	ʃʷʼəsʼa	шӀуцӀэ	ʃʷʼət͡sʼa	фӀыцӀэ	fʼət͡sʼa
to yell	сӀэсӀэн	sʼasʼan	цӀэцӀэн	t͡sʼat͡sʼan	цӀэцӀэн	t͡sʼat͡sʼan
naked	псӀанэ	psʼaːna	пцӀанэ	pt͡sʼaːna	пцӀанэ	pt͡sʼaːna
wet	сӀынэ	sʼəna	цӀынэ	t͡sʼəna	цӀынэ	t͡sʼəna
sharp	папсӀэ	paːpsʼa	папцӀэ	paːpt͡sʼa	папцӀэ	paːpt͡sʼa
to lay eggs	кӀьэсӀын	kʲʼəsʼən	кӀэцӀын	t͡ʃʼət͡sʼən	кӀэцӀын	t͡ʃʼət͡sʼən
dark-skinned	къуапсӀэ	qʷaːpsʼa	къуапцӀэ	qʷaːpt͡sʼa	къуапцӀэ	qʷaːpt͡sʼa
nit (louse egg)	сӀакӀьэ	sʼaːkʲʼa	цӀакӀэ	t͡sʼaːt͡ʃʼa	-	-
barefoot	лъапсӀэ	ɬaːpsʼa	лъапцӀэ	ɬaːpst͡sʼa	лъапцӀэ	ɬaːpst͡sʼa
swallow (bird)	псӀашъухъо	psʼaːʃʷχʷa	пцӀашхъо	pt͡sʼaːʃχʷa	пцӀашхъо	pt͡sʼaːɕχʷa
to envy	енэсӀын	janasʼən	енэцӀын	janat͡sʼən	енэцӀын	janat͡sʼən
to close eyes	гъэупӀысӀэн	ʁawpʼəsʼan	гъэупӀыцӀэн	ʁawpʼət͡sʼan	гъэупӀыцӀэн	ʁawpʼət͡sʼan
to throw upon	хэупсӀэн	xawpsʼan	хэупцӀэн	xawpt͡sʼan	хэупцӀэн	xawpt͡sʼan
to shit	сӀын	sʼən	цӀын	t͡sʼən	цӀын	t͡sʼən

The labialized retroflex consonants шъу [ʂʷ] and жъу [ʐʷ] in the Temirgoy dialect are alveolo-palatal щу [ɕʷ] and жьу [ʑʷ] in the Black Sea coast dialects of Adyghe (Shapsug dialect and Natukhai dialect).

- Shapsug щу [ɕʷ] ↔ шъу [ʂʷ] in Standard:

Meaning	Shapsug		Standard Adyghe		Kabardian	
Meaning	Cyrillic	IPA	Cyrillic	IPA	Cyrillic	IPA
honey	щоу	ɕʷaw	шъоу	ʂʷaw	фо	faw
color	що	ɕʷa	шъо	ʂʷa	фэ	fa

- Shapsug жьу [ʑʷ] ↔ жъу [ʐʷ] in Standard:

Meaning	Shapsug		Standard Adyghe		Kabardian	
Meaning	Cyrillic	IPA	Cyrillic	IPA	Cyrillic	IPA
star	жьуагъо	ʑʷaːʁʷa	жъуагъо	ʐʷaːʁʷa	вагъуэ	vaːʁʷa
rock	мыжьо	məʑʷa	мыжъо	məʐʷa	мывэ	məva
wide	Ӏужьу	ʔʷəʑʷə	Ӏужъу	ʔʷəʐʷə	Ӏувы	ʔʷəvə

The Shapsug and Natukhai dialects has many different variants. The following differences apply to some of them.

- Shapsug с [s] ↔ ц [t͡s] in Standard:

Meaning	Shapsug		Standard Adyghe		Kabardian	
Meaning	Cyrillic	IPA	Cyrillic	IPA	Cyrillic	IPA
to carry out	гъэсэкӀэн	ʁasat͡ʃʼan	гъэцэкӀэн	ʁat͡sat͡ʃʼan	гъэзэщӀэн	ʁat͡saɕʼan

- Shapsug шъухъу [ʃʷχʷ] ↔ шхъу [ʃχʷ] in Standard:

Meaning	Shapsug		Standard Adyghe		Kabardian	
Meaning	Cyrillic	IPA	Cyrillic	IPA	Cyrillic	IPA
blue	шъухъуатӀэ	ʃʷχʷaːtʼa	шхъуантнӀэ	ʃχʷaːntʼa	шхъуантӀэ	ʃχʷaːntʼa
to envy	шъухъогъон	ʃʷχʷaʁʷan	шхъогъон	ʃχʷaʁʷan	шхъогъуэн	ʃχʷaʁʷan
swallow (bird)	псӀашъухъо	psʼaːʃʷχʷa	пцӀашхъо	pt͡sʼaːʃχʷa	пцӀашхъо	pt͡sʼaːʃχʷa
hawk	бгъашъухъо	bʁaːʃʷχʷa	бгъашхъо	bʁaːʃχʷa	бгъащхъуэ	bʁaːʃχʷa

- Shapsug р [r] ↔ н [n] in Standard:

Meaning	Shapsug		Standard Adyghe		Kabardian	
Meaning	Cyrillic	IPA	Cyrillic	IPA	Cyrillic	IPA
wrong	ӀортӀагъ	ʔʷartʼaːʁ	ӀонтӀагъ	ʔʷantʼaːʁ	ӀуэнтӀа	ʔʷantʼa
to pop / to burst	пӀэркӀьын	pʼarkʲʼən	пӀонкӀын	pʷʼant͡ʃʼən	пӀэнкӀын	pʼant͡ʃʼən
mirror	гъургьэ	ʁʷərɡʲa	гъунджэ	ʁʷərd͡ʒa	гъуджэ	ʁʷəd͡ʒa

- Shapsug ф [f] ↔ м [m] in Standard:

Meaning	Shapsug		Standard Adyghe		Kabardian	
Meaning	Cyrillic	IPA	Cyrillic	IPA	Cyrillic	IPA
to try to smell	фэмэн	faman	пэмэн	paman	пэмэн	paman
race	зэфачэ	zafaːt͡ʃa	зэпачъэ	zafaːt͡ʂa	зэпажэ	zafaːʒa

- Shapsug ц [t͡s] ↔ с [s] in Standard:

Meaning	Shapsug		Standard Adyghe		Kabardian	
Meaning	Cyrillic	IPA	Cyrillic	IPA	Cyrillic	IPA
to thrust	хицэн	xit͡san	хисэн	xisan	хисэн	xisan
be careful	фэцакъ	fat͡saːq	фэсакъ	fasaːq	хуэсакъ	xʷasaːq
snot	пэпцы	papt͡sə	пэпсы	papsə	пэпсы	papsə
thin	пцыгъо	pt͡səʁʷa	псыгъо	psəʁʷa	псыгъуэ	psəʁʷa

==== Affrication of Fricatives ====
In the Bzhedugh, Hatuqay and Shapsug dialects, a specific consonant hardening process known as affrication occurs. During this process, softer "sh" sounds (palato-alveolar fricatives) harden into "ch" sounds (affricates) whenever they directly follow the sibilant consonants ⟨с⟩ [s] or ⟨шъу⟩ [ʃʷ].

To understand this, it helps to think of a similar unwritten sound change in English involving the letters dr and tr. Even though it isn't spelled this way, drink, drop, and dragon are naturally pronounced with a "j-r" sound instead of a hard "d-r". Similarly, tree, true, and trust are pronounced with a "ch-r" sound instead of a "t-r". In these Adyghe dialects, the combination of these specific consonants naturally hardens in speech in the exact same way.

Importantly, this sound change is not written, but is pronounced. Standard Adyghe spelling keeps the original letters, but speakers of these dialects will automatically pronounce the hardened versions.

Specifically, the following base letter changes take place:

- ⟨ш⟩ and ⟨щ⟩ harden into ⟨ч⟩.
- ⟨шъ⟩ hardens into ⟨чъ⟩.
- ⟨шӏ⟩ hardens into ⟨чӏ⟩.
- ⟨шъу⟩ hardens into ⟨чъу⟩.
- ⟨шӏу⟩ hardens into ⟨чӏу⟩.

Pronunciation Rules In grammar, this process is almost exclusively triggered when attaching the first-person singular prefix с- (I/me) or the second-person plural prefix шъу- (you all) to a word.

Here are all the possible combinations where this sound change occurs:

Affrication Combinations
Trigger	Base Consonant	Cyrillic Change	IPA Transformation
с- (I)	ш	сш → сч	[sʃ] → [st͡ʃ]
с- (I)	щ	сщ → сч	[sɕ] → [st͡ʃ]
с- (I)	шъ	сшъ → счъ	[sʂ] → [st͡ʂ]
с- (I)	шӏ	сшӏ → счӏ	[sʃʼ] → [sʈ͡ʂʼ]
с- (I)	шъу	сшъу → счъу	[sʃʷ] → [st͡ʂʷ]
с- (I)	шӏу	сшӏу → счӏу	[sʃʷʼ] → [sʈ͡ʂʷʼ]
шъу- (You pl.)	ш	шъуш → шъуч	[ʃʷʃ] → [ʃʷt͡ʃ]
шъу- (You pl.)	щ	шъущ → шъуч	[ʃʷɕ] → [ʃʷt͡ʃ]
шъу- (You pl.)	шъ	шъушъ → шъучъ	[ʃʷʂ] → [ʃʷt͡ʂ]
шъу- (You pl.)	шӏ	шъушӏ → шъучӏ	[ʃʷʃʼ] → [ʃʷʈ͡ʂʼ]
шъу- (You pl.)	шъу	шъушъу → шъучъу	[ʃʷʃʷ] → [ʃʷt͡ʂʷ]
шъу- (You pl.)	шӏу	шъушӏу → шъучӏу	[ʃʷʃʷʼ] → [ʃʷʈ͡ʂʷʼ]

When the change occurs The change only happens when the triggering prefix directly touches the affected consonant.

Example	Explanation
сшӏагъ → счӏагъ	The sound changes because the prefix с- comes directly before шӏ.
сшӏэрэп → счӏэрэп	The sound changes because the prefix с- comes directly before шӏ.
шъушӏагъ → шъучӏагъ	The sound changes because the prefix шъу- comes directly before шӏ.

When the change does NOT occur If there is a vowel in between the letters, or if a different consonant prefix is used, the sound does not harden.

Example	Explanation
сэшӏэ	No change. There is a vowel (э) separating the с and шӏ, preventing the sounds from interacting.
пшӏагъ	No change. The prefix is п-, which does not trigger the hardening.
ушӏагъ	No change. The prefix is у-, which does not trigger the hardening.
тшӏагъ	No change. The prefix is т-, which does not trigger the hardening.

Comprehensive Examples Below are extensive examples comparing the standard orthography with the spoken affrication in the Bzhedugh, Hatuqay and Shapsug dialects, demonstrating both the 1st Person Singular (с-) and 2nd Person Plural (шъу-) grammatical forms.

Examples of Affrication by Dialect
Meaning	Pronoun	Letter Change	Standard Adyghe (Base Form)	Bzhedugh, Hatuqay & Shapsug (Affricated Pronunciation)
I sealed it	I	сшъ → счъ	сшъыбыгъ	→ счъыбыгъ
You (pl.) sealed it	You (pl.)	шъушъ → шъучъ	шъушъыбыгъ	→ шъучъыбыгъ
I took (him/her to); I brought (him/her here; married)	I	сщ → сч	сщагъ къэсщагъ	→ счагъ къэсчагъ
You (pl.) took (him/her to); You (pl.) brought (him/her here)	You (pl.)	шъущ → шъуч	шъущагъ къэшъущагъ	→ шъучагъ къэшъучагъ
I bought I bought (dir.)	I	сщ → сч	сщэфыгъ къэсщэфыгъ	→ счэфыгъ къэсчэфыгъ
You (pl.) bought You (pl.) bought (dir.)	You (pl.)	шъущ → шъуч	шъущэфыгъ къэшъущэфыгъ	→ шъучэфыгъ къэшъучэфыгъ
I forgot I forgot (dir.)	I	сщ → сч	сщыгъупшыгъ къэсщыгъупшыгъ	→ счыгъупшыгъ къэсчыгъупшыгъ
You (pl.) forgot You (pl.) forgot (dir.)	You (pl.)	шъущ → шъуч	шъущыгъупшыгъ къэшъущыгъупшыгъ	→ шъучыгъупшыгъ къэшъучыгъупшыгъ
I don't know I don't know (dir.)	I	сшӏ → счӏ	сшӏэрэп къэсшӏэрэп	→ счӏэрэп къэсчӏэрэп
You (pl.) don't know You (pl.) don't know (dir.)	You (pl.)	шъушӏ → шъучӏ	шъушӏэрэп къэшъушӏэрэп	→ шъучӏэрэп къэшъучӏэрэп
I knew I knew (dir.)	I	сшӏ → счӏ	сшӏагъ къэсшӏагъ	→ счӏагъ къэсчӏагъ
You (pl.) knew You (pl.) knew (dir.)	You (pl.)	шъушӏ → шъучӏ	шъушӏагъ къэшъушӏагъ	→ шъучӏагъ къэшъучӏагъ
I thought I thought (dir.)	I	сшӏ → счӏ	сшӏошӏыгъ къэсшӏошӏыгъ	→ счӏошӏыгъ къэсчӏошӏыгъ
You (pl.) thought You (pl.) thought (dir.)	You (pl.)	шъушӏ → шъучӏ	шъушӏошӏыгъ къэшъушӏошӏыгъ	→ шъучӏошӏыгъ къэшъучӏошӏыгъ
It fits me It fits me (dir.)	I	сщ → сч	сщэфэ къэсщэфэ	→ счэфэ къэсчэфэ
It fits you (pl.); It fits you (pl.) (dir.)	You (pl.)	шъущ → шъуч	шъущэфэ къэшъущэфэ	→ шъучэфэ къэшъучэфэ
I laughed at him/her	I	сщ → сч	сщыгушӏукӏыгъ	→ счыгушӏукӏыгъ
You (pl.) laughed at him/her	You (pl.)	шъущ → шъуч	шъущыгушӏукӏыгъ	→ шъучыгушӏукӏыгъ

== Grammar differences ==
=== Dynamic prefix рэ- ===
To understand the unique role of the Shapsug dynamic prefix рэ- (ra-), it must be placed within the broader context of Proto-Circassian morphology. In Proto-Circassian, the dynamic prefix is reconstructed as *wa- (уэ-). This verbal morpheme spans across several grammatical categories, but its primary function is strictly to indicate that a verb is operating in the positive, dynamic, present tense.

As the languages diverged, this prefix underwent distinct phonological shifts across the standard branches:

- West Circassian (Standard Adyghe): Shifted to -э- ([-a-])
- East Circassian (Standard Kabardian): Shifted to -о- ([-o-])

Normally, the morphological placement of this dynamic prefix falls between the personal pronoun prefixes and the verb root. For example, in the 1st person present tense, the dynamic prefix attaches directly to the personal pronoun:

- Standard Adyghe: сэ с-э-кӀо (I go)
- Standard Kabardian: сэ с-о-кӀуэ (I go)

==== The мэ- (ma-) Mutation and Standard Omissions ====
A significant structural mutation occurs across all dialects in monovalent intransitive verbs when conjugated for the third person (he/she/it/they). Because the third-person absolutive index in Circassian is a null prefix (∅-), the dynamic prefix is forced into the absolute word-initial position.

Circassian phonotactics do not permit the standard dynamic vowels (-э- or -о-) to stand alone at the beginning of a word without a preceding consonant. Consequently, the prefix mutates into мэ- (ma-) in both the West and East branches (e.g., ∅-э-кӀо mutates to макӀо).

This behavior establishes the dynamic prefix in the positive present tense. In these forms, мэ- acts as the 3rd person dynamic prefix, and -э- (or -о- in Kabardian) acts as the 1st/2nd person dynamic prefix.

Present Tense: Presence of the Dynamic Prefix
Person	Verb State	Standard Adyghe	Standard Kabardian	Shapsug
3rd Person (мэ- mutation)	Base	макӀо (∅-мэ-кӀо)	макӀуэ (∅-мэ-кӀуэ)	макӀо (∅-мэ-кӀо)
3rd Person (мэ- mutation)	Returning (-жьы / -жы)	мэкӀожьы	мэкӀуэжы	мэкӀожьы
3rd Person (мэ- mutation)	Potential (-шъу / -ф)	мэкӀошъу	мэкӀуэф	мэкӀошъу
1st Person (э / о prefix)	Base	сэкӀо (с-э-кӀо)	сокӀуэ (с-о-кӀуэ)	сэкӀо (с-э-кӀо)
1st Person (э / о prefix)	Returning (-жьы / -жы)	сэкӀожьы	сокӀуэжы	сэкӀожьы
1st Person (э / о prefix)	Potential (-шъу / -ф)	сэкӀошъу	сокӀуэф	сэкӀошъу

The Drop Rule in Standard Dialects: In Standard Adyghe and Standard Kabardian, the dynamic prefix is highly restricted. While it is clearly present in the present tense (as shown above), it drops out entirely from the verb complex in non-present tenses (like the past and future) and in negative forms.

When the dynamic prefix is omitted, the мэ- mutation naturally disappears alongside it, leaving the bare verb root exposed in the 3rd person. The following table illustrates this absence in the standard dialects, demonstrating how the prefix vanishes when leaving the positive present tense:

Standard Dialects: Presence vs. Absence of the Dynamic Prefix (3rd Person)
Tense / Polarity	Standard Adyghe	Standard Kabardian	Morphology (Standard)	Status
Present Positive	макӀо	макӀуэ	∅-мэ-кӀо / ∅-мэ-кӀуэ	Prefix Present
Present Negative	кӀорэп	кӀуэркъым	∅-кӀо-рэ-п / ∅-кӀуэ-ркъым	Prefix Absent (Bare Root)
Past Positive	кӀуагъ	кӀуащ	∅-кӀу-агъ / ∅-кӀу-ащ	Prefix Absent (Bare Root)

==== The Shapsug Divergence: Retention of рэ- ====
This phenomenon of exposing the bare verb root is where the Shapsug dialect dramatically diverges. Instead of leaving the verb root bare when the standard dynamic prefix drops out, Shapsug introduces and retains a unique dialectal dynamic prefix: рэ- (ra-).

In environments where standard dialects have nothing (past tense, negative polarity, conditionals, conjunctions), Shapsug explicitly attaches рэ-. This creates a sharp morphological contrast. Where Standard Adyghe and Kabardian expose the bare root in negative and past forms, Shapsug protects the root with the рэ- prefix:

Contrast: Standard Omission vs. Shapsug Retention
Tense / Polarity	Person	Standard Adyghe (Bare Root)	Standard Kabardian (Bare Root)	Shapsug (рэ- Retention)
Present Negative	3rd Person	кӀорэп кӀожьырэп кӀошъурэп	кӀуэркъым кӀуэжыркъым кӀуэфыркъым	рэкӀорэп рэкӀожьырэп рэкӀошъурэп
Present Negative	1st Person	сыкӀорэп сыкӀожьырэп сыкӀошъурэп	сыкӀуэркъым сыкӀуэжыркъым сыкӀуэфыркъым	сыкӀорэп сыкӀожьырэп сыкӀошъурэп
Past Tense	3rd Person	кӀуагъ кӀожьыгъ кӀошъугъ	кӀуащ кӀуэжащ кӀуэфащ	рэкӀуагъ рэкӀожьыгъ рэкӀошъугъ
Past Tense	1st Person	сыкӀуагъ сыкӀожьыгъ сыкӀошъугъ	сыкӀуащ сыкӀуэжащ сыкӀуэфащ	сыкӀуагъ сыкӀожьыгъ сыкӀошъугъ

==== Complete Paradigm of рэ- ====
Because of this retention mechanism, the рэ- prefix permeates the Shapsug verbal system in almost all non-present environments. The following table outlines the persistent presence of the Shapsug prefix across various grammatical environments, using the root кӀон/кӀуэн (to go). It demonstrates how the prefix survives alongside particles, conjunctions, and negative suffixes, explicitly compared against the bare roots of Standard Adyghe and Kabardian:

Extensive Cross-Dialectal Forms Showing Shapsug рэ- Retention
Grammatical Environment	Standard Adyghe	Standard Kabardian	Shapsug Form	Shapsug Morphology
Present Participle (Absolutive)	кӀорэр	кӀуэр	рэкӀорэр	рэ-кӀо-рэ-р
Present Negative Participle (Absolutive)	мыкӀорэр	мыкӀуэр	рэмыкӀорэр	рэ-мы-кӀо-рэ-р
Present Participle (Oblique)	кӀорэм	кӀуэм	рэкӀорэм	рэ-кӀо-рэ-м
Present Participle (Instrumental)	кӀорэмкӀэ	кӀуэмкӀэ	рэкӀорэмгьэ	рэ-кӀо-рэ-м-гьэ
Present Negative	кӀорэп	кӀуэркъым	рэкӀорэп	рэ-кӀо-рэ-п
Adverbial / Conjunction	кӀоу	кӀуэуэ	рэкӀоу	рэ-кӀо-у
Conditional	кӀомэ	кӀуэмэ	рэкӀомэ	рэ-кӀо-мэ
Concessive	кӀоми	кӀуэми	рэкӀоми	рэ-кӀо-ми
Past Conjunction	кӀуи	кӀуэри / кӀуи	рэкӀуи	рэ-кӀу-и
Past Tense	кӀуагъ	кӀуащ	рэкӀуагъ	рэ-кӀу-агъ
Future / Imperfect	кӀо(щ)т	кӀуэнущ	рэкӀо(щ)т	рэ-кӀо-(щ)т
Past Negative	кӀуагъэп	кӀуакъым	рэкӀуагъэп	рэ-кӀу-агъ-эп
Future Negative	кӀо(щ)тэп	кӀуэнукъым	рэкӀо(щ)тэп	рэ-кӀо-(щ)т-эп
Negative Conditional	мыкӀомэ	мыкӀуэмэ	рэмыкӀомэ	рэ-мы-кӀо-мэ
Negative Concessive	мыкӀоми	мыкӀуэми	рэмыкӀоми	рэ-мы-кӀо-ми

==== Examples ====
The following sentences illustrate the practical usage of the Shapsug dynamic prefix рэ- in everyday speech. These examples demonstrate how Standard Adyghe forms omit the dynamic prefix in non-present grammatical environments, whereas Shapsug consistently retains it to protect the verb root.

Sentence Comparison: Shapsug рэ- Retention vs Standard Adyghe
Shapsug	Standard Adyghe	English Translation	Highlighted Prefix Usage
рэмыдаӀорэм лӀэу рэхъутэр ишӀэтэп	мыдэӀорэм сыд хъущтыр ышӀэщтэп	The one who does not listen will not know what will happen.	Retained in negative participles (рэ-мыдаӀорэм) and future/imperfect nominalizations (рэ-хъутэр).
зыгори рэхъугъэп, зыгорэ звхъугьэ, сыогьэт	зыгори хъугъэп, зыгорэ зыхъукӀэ, сыоджэщт	Nothing happened; when something happens, I will call you.	Retained in the past negative tense (рэ-хъугъэп) where the standard exposes the bare root.
кӀалэр рэсымэгьагъ, тхьэм иӀомэ псыкӀэу рэхъужьыт	кӀалэр сымэджагъэ, тхьэм ыӀомэ псынкӀэу хъужьыщт	The boy got sick; God willing, he will recover quickly.	Retained in both the past positive (рэ-сымэгьагъ) and the future/imperfect tense (рэ-хъужьыт).
кӀалэр рэшхэн фай	кӀалэр шхэн фай	The boy needs to eat.	Retained even in infinitive/masdar forms preceding modal indicators (рэ-шхэн).

=== Instrumental case ===
In the instrumental case the noun has the suffix -мгьэ (-mɡʲa) or -гьэ (-gʲa) unlike other dialects that has the suffix -мкӀэ (-mt͡ʃa) or -кӀэ (-t͡ʃa).

- Shapsug: КӀалэр Адыгэбзэгьэ мэгущаӀэ ↔ Standard: КӀалэр АдыгэбзэкӀэ мэгущаӀэ - "The boy speaks (using) Adyghe language".
- Shapsug: Къэлэмымгьэ сэтхэ ↔ Standard: КъэлэмымкӀэ сэтхэ - "I write (using) with the pencil".

=== Desirement mood ===
In the Shapsug dialect, the suffix ~рагъу /raːʁʷ/ is added to verbs to indicate the desirement to do that verb. For example:

- Туканым сыкӀорагъу - "I want to go to the shop".
- ЕсыпӀэм рэкӀорэгъуагъ - "(S)he wanted to go to the pool".
- КъэкӀорэгъот кӀалэр - "The boy would want to come".
- Тутын уешъорагъуа? - "Do you want to smoke cigarette?".
- Нэущы сыпдэгущаӀэрагъу - "I want to speak with you tomorrow".
- Сышхэрагъу ыгь - "I want to eat now".

=== Upward prefix ===
In Standard Adyghe, to express that the verb's direction is upward, the prefix дэ- /da-/ and the suffix -е /-ja/ is added to the verb. In Shapsug dialect, the prefix чӀэ- /t͡ʃʼa-/ is added instead.

Meaning	Standard Adyghe		Shapsug	
Meaning	Cyrillic	IPA	Cyrillic	IPA
to go upward	дэкӀоен	dakʷʼajan	чӀыкӀьын	t͡ʃʼəkʲʼən
to run upward	дэчъэен	dat͡ʂajan	чӀышъутын	t͡ʃʼəʃʷtən
to look upward	дэплъыен	dapɬəjan	чӀыплъын	t͡ʃʼəpɬən
to jump upward	дэпкӀыен	dapt͡ʃʼəjan	чӀыпкӀьын	t͡ʃʼəpkʲʼən
to raise	дэщыен	daɕəjan	чӀыщын	t͡ʃʼəɕən
to carry upward	дэхьыен	daħəjan	чӀыхын	t͡ʃʼəxən
to fly upward	дэбыбыен	dabəbəjan	чӀыбыбын	t͡ʃʼəbəbən
to throw upward	дедзыен	dajd͡zəjan	чӀыдзын	t͡ʃʼəd͡zən
to shoot upward	дэоен	dawajan	чӀыун	t͡ʃʼəwən
to elevate	дэгъэкӀоен	daʁakʷʼajan	чӀыгъэкӀьын	t͡ʃʼəʁakʲʼən

=== Demonstratives ===
Shapsug has six primary demonstratives used to indicate spatial proximity, visibility, and mutual understanding. These frequently act as determiners preceding nouns or as prefixes attached to verbs and adverbs. Four correspond directly to Standard Adyghe forms (а, мы, мо, джэ), while дыу and дымы are Shapsug innovations formed by contraction.

Shapsug	IPA	Meaning	Standard Adyghe	Usage	Etymology
а	/ʔaː/	that (invisible)	а	Referent is far away and invisible to both the speaker and the listener(s).	—
мы	/mə/	this	мы	Referent is in close proximity to both the speaker and the listener(s).	—
у	/wə/	that (visible)	мо	Referent is visible and at a known distance, seen by both speaker and listener. Replaces standard мо.	—
гьэ	/gʲa/	that (shared knowledge)	джэ	Referent is typically invisible but previously established in the conversation; both parties have the exact same referent in mind. Replaces standard джэ.	—
дыу	/dəwə/	that (over there)	(модэ мо)	Visible referent whose specific location is emphasized, often with pointing; frequently introduces a new referent.	< удэ у ("there" + "that"); cf. std. модэ мо
дымы	/dəmə/	this (over here)	(мыдэ мы)	Very near visible referent, often with pointing within a shared space (e.g. a room). Close-proximity counterpart to дыу.	< мыдэ мы ("here" + "this")

=== Future tense ===
In the Great Shapsug sub dialect (like Bzhedug) the future tense suffix is ~эт (~at) and in some cases ~ыт (~ət) unlike the Small Shapsug sub dialect that has (like Chemirguy) the Suffix ~щт (~ɕt)).

Word	Adyghe						Standard Kabardian	
Word	Small Shapsug		Great Shapsug		Standard Adyghe		Standard Kabardian	
Word	IPA	Cyrillic	IPA	Cyrillic	IPA	Cyrillic	IPA	Cyrillic
I will go	səkʷʼaɕt	сыкӀощт	səkʷʼat	сыкӀот	səkʷʼaɕt	сыкӀощт	səkʷʼanəwɕ	сыкӀуэнущ
you will go	wəkʷʼaɕt	укӀощт	wəkʷʼat	укӀот	wəkʷʼaɕt	укӀощт	wəkʷʼanəwɕ	укӀуэнущ
he will go	rakʷʼaɕt	рэкӀощт	rakʷʼat	рэкӀот	kʷʼaɕt	кӀощт	kʷʼanəwɕ	кӀуэнущ
we will go	təkʷʼaɕt	тыкӀощт	təkʷʼat	тыкӀот	təkʷʼaɕt	тыкӀощт	dəkʷʼanəwɕ	дыкӀуэнущ
you (plural) will go	ʃʷəkʷʼaɕt	шъукӀощт	ʃʷəkʷʼat	шъукӀот	ʃʷəkʷʼaɕt	шъукӀощт	fəkʷʼanəwɕ	фыкӀуэнущ
they will go	rakʷʼaɕtəx	рэкӀощтых	rakʷʼatəx	рэкӀотых	kʷʼaɕtəx	кӀощтых	jaːkʷʼanəwɕ	якӀуэнущ

=== Present participles ===
In standard Adyghe, present participles decline using standard nominal case suffixes. However, the Shapsug, Bzhedugh, and Hatuqai dialects feature a distinct phonological elision in the absolutive case, where the final absolutive suffix -р (-r) is not pronounced. Consequently, absolutive present participles in these dialects end simply in -рэ instead of the standard -рэр. For example, the standard Adyghe phrase кӀалэу кӀорэр ("the boy who is going") is realized in these dialects as кӀалэу кӀорэ.

Furthermore, the Shapsug dialect has unique morphological additions for these participles. Shapsug adds the prefix рэ- (ra-) to the forms.

Present Participle Declension (e.g., кӀон - "to go")
Case	Standard Adyghe	Bzhedugh & Hatuqai	Shapsug
Absolutive	кӀорэр	кӀорэ	рэкӀорэ / рэкӀорэр
Ergative / Oblique	кӀорэм	кӀорэм	рэкӀорэм
Instrumental	кӀорэмкӀэ	кӀорэмкӀэ	рэкӀорэмгьэ

=== Interrogative words ===
The word "what" in Standard Adyghe is сыд while in Shapsug it is шъыд and from it derives different terms.

Word	Adyghe			
Word	Great Shapsug		Small Shapsug	
Word	IPA	Cyrillic	IPA	Cyrillic
what	ʂəd	шъыд	səd	сыд
why	ʂədaː	шъыда	sədaː	сыда
when	ʂədʁʷa, ʂədəjʁʷa	шъыдгъо, шъыдигъо	sədəjʁʷa	сыдигъо
whenever	ɕədʁʷaməj	шъыдгъоми	sədəjʁʷaməj	сыдигъоми
so	ʂtaw	шъыдэу	sədaw	сыдэу
with what	ʂədɡʲa	шъыдгьэ	sədt͡ʃʼa	сыдкӀэ
how	ʂədawɕtaw	шъыдэущтэу	sədawɕtaw	сыдэущтэу
how much	ʂəd fadəjz	шъыд фэдиз	səd fadəjz	сыд фэдиз
how much	ʂədəχaːt	шъыдыхъат	-	-
always	ʂədəʁʷəj	шъыдгъуи	sədəʁʷəj	сыдигъуи

Shapsug has two words for "what":

- шъыд (Refers to an inanimate object, typically tangible).
- лӀэу (Refers to an inanimate object, typically intangible).

The word "лӀэу" was lost in other Adyghe dialects. In Shapsug, from it derives different terms :

Word	Shapsug		Standard Adyghe	
Word	IPA	Cyrillic	IPA	Cyrillic
what	ɬʼaw	лӀэу	səd	сыд
who, what	ɬʼawʑəm	лӀэужьым	sədəm	сыдым
what on earth?!	ɬʼawəʑ	лӀэужь	səd	сыд
what could it be?	ɬʼawɕət	лӀэужьыщт	sədəɕt	сыдыщт
with what	ɬʼawəʑəɡʲa	лӀэужьыгьэ	sədt͡ʃʼa	сыдкӀэ
whatever	ɬʼawəʑəʁʷaməj	лӀэужыгъоми	səd ɬʼawəʑəʁʷaməj	сыд лӀэужыгъоми
whatever	ɬʼawəʑəməj	лӀэужьыми	sədməj	сыдми
whatever	ɬʼawəʑaw	лӀэужьэу	sədaw	сыдэу

Shapsugs also have different interrogative words from the word тэ "which":

Word	Shapsug		Standard Adyghe	
Word	IPA	Cyrillic	IPA	Cyrillic
like what	taɕfad	тэщ фэд	səd fad	сыд фэд
how much	taɕ fadəz	тэщ фэдиз	səd fadəz	сыд фэдиз
when	taɕʁʷəm	тэщгъум	sədəjʁʷa	сыдигъо
how	taɕtaw	тэщтэу	sədawɕtaw	сыдэущтэу
which one	taːrə	тары	sədər	сыдыр
which one	taɕ	тэщ	sədəm	сыдым

=== Location ===
Adyghe demonstratives mark three degrees of deixis: proximal мы- ("this; here"), medial мо- ("that; there", in view), and distal а- ("that; there", out of view). Standard Adyghe derives adverbs of place from these roots with two series, named here by their distal forms акӀэ and адэ — e.g. proximal мыкӀэ~мыдэ "here", medial мокӀэ~модэ "(over) there", distal акӀэ~адэ "yonder".

Many dialects, among them Shapsug, Bzhedugh and part of Abzakh, lack the акӀэ series altogether; in its place they use four series — адэ, а тӀэкӀум (with the postposition тӀэкӀу(м) "a bit, a spot"), ау and аукӀэ. Two regular correspondences distinguish these western dialects. In the аукӀэ series the final element — Standard -кӀэ /-t͡ʃʼa/ — surfaces as -гьэ /-ɡʲa/ in Shapsug (аугьэ) and as -джэ /-d͡ʒa/ in Bzhedugh (ауджэ). Second, the medial root мо- is reduced to о- /wa-/ in both Shapsug and Bzhedugh (модэ, моу → одэ, оу). Bzhedugh and the Hatuqay subdialect behave identically and are shown together.

Meaning	Series	Variety			
Meaning	Series	Standard Adyghe	Shapsug	Bzhedugh / Hatuqay	Abzakh (some)
here (мы-/мэ-)	акӀэ	мыкӀэ /mət͡ʃʼa/	—		
here (мы-/мэ-)	адэ	мыдэ /məda/	мыдэ /məda/	мыдэ /məda/	мыдэ /məda/
here (мы-/мэ-)	а тӀэкӀум	—	мы тӀэкӀум /mə tʼakʷʼəm/	мы тӀэкӀум /mə tʼakʷʼəm/	мы тӀэкӀум /mə tʼakʷʼəm/
here (мы-/мэ-)	ау	—	мэу /maw/	мэу /maw/	мэу /maw/
here (мы-/мэ-)	аукӀэ	—	мэугьэ /mawɡʲa/	мэуджэ /mawd͡ʒa/	мэукӀэ /mawt͡ʃʼa/
there, visible (мо-/о-)	акӀэ	мокӀэ /mot͡ʃʼa/	—		
there, visible (мо-/о-)	адэ	модэ /moda/	одэ /wada/	одэ /wada/	модэ /moda/
there, visible (мо-/о-)	а тӀэкӀум	—	о тӀэкӀум /wa tʼakʷʼəm/	о тӀэкӀум /wa tʼakʷʼəm/	мо тӀэкӀум /mo tʼakʷʼəm/
there, visible (мо-/о-)	ау	—	оу /waw/	оу /waw/	моу /mow/
there, visible (мо-/о-)	аукӀэ	—	оугьэ /wawɡʲa/	оуджэ /wawd͡ʒa/	моукӀэ /mowt͡ʃʼa/
there, out of sight (а-)	акӀэ	акӀэ /aːt͡ʃʼa/	—		
there, out of sight (а-)	адэ	адэ /aːda/	адэ /aːda/	адэ /aːda/	адэ /aːda/
there, out of sight (а-)	а тӀэкӀум	—	а тӀэкӀум /aː tʼakʷʼəm/	а тӀэкӀум /aː tʼakʷʼəm/	а тӀэкӀум /aː tʼakʷʼəm/
there, out of sight (а-)	ау	—	ау /aːw/	ау /aːw/	ау /aːw/
there, out of sight (а-)	аукӀэ	—	аугьэ /aːwɡʲa/	ауджэ /aːwd͡ʒa/	аукӀэ /aːwt͡ʃʼa/

The interrogative тэ- "where" and the emphatic demonstrative (Standard джэ-, Shapsug гьэ-) take the same series: Standard тэкӀэ and джэкӀэ correspond to Shapsug тэу~тэугьэ and гьэу~гьэугьэ.

=== Big suffix (~фо) ===
- The standard Adyghe's suffix -шхо /-ʃxʷa/ which means big or mighty is -фo /-fˠa/ in the Shapsug dialect:

Meaning	Shapsug		Standard Adyghe		Bzhedugh	
Meaning	Cyrillic	IPA	Cyrillic	IPA	Cyrillic	IPA
mighty God	тхьэфo	tħafˠa	тхьэшхо	tħaʃxʷa	тхьэшко	tħaʃkʷa
large house	унэфo	wənafˠa	унэшхо	wənaʃxʷa	унэшко	wənaʃkʷa

=== Positional prefix directly (джэхэ~) ===
- The standard Adyghe's positional prefix -жэхэ /-ʒaxa/ which designates action directed at something or someone forcefully is -джэхэ /-d͡ʒaxa/ in the Shapsug dialect :

Meaning	Shapsug		Chemirguy	
Meaning	Cyrillic	IPA	Cyrillic	IPA
to collide with	джэхэхьэн	d͡ʒaxaħan	жэхэхьэн	ʒaxaħan
to hit someone	джэхэон	d͡ʒaxawan	жэхэон	ʒaxawan
to throw at someone	джэхэдзэн	d͡ʒaxad͡zan	жэхэдзэн	ʒaxad͡zan
to look steadily at	джэхэплъэн	d͡ʒaxapɬan	жэхэплъэн	ʒaxapɬan
to jump on someone for assault	джэхэпкӀьэн	d͡ʒaxapkʲʼan	жэхэпкӀэн	ʒaxapt͡ʃʼan

=== Positional prefix merging (го~) ===
- In the Shapsug and Natukhai dialects, the verbal prefix го~ /ɡʷa-/ designates process of joining or merging with an object on a body. This positional conjugation does not exist in other Circassian dialects. for example :

Meaning	Adyghe		Notes
Meaning	Cyrillic	IPA	Notes
to throw at	годзэн	ɡʷad͡zan	to throw an object on a steed or someone's neck
to merge to	гохьэн	ɡʷaħan	to merge with an object
to look at	гоплъэн	ɡʷapɬan	to look at a steed or someone's neck
to fit at to fall at	гофэн	ɡʷafan	to fit on a steed or someone's neck an object to fall on a steed or someone's neck
to take from	гохын	ɡʷaxən	to take an object a steed or someone's neck
to come down from	гокӀын	ɡʷat͡ʃʼən	to get off a steed or someone's neck
to put at	голъхьэн	ɡʷaɬħan	to put an object on a steed or someone's neck
to stand on	гоуцон	ɡʷawt͡sʷan	to beat up someone
to fall from	гозын	ɡʷazən	to fall from the body of something or someone

цум	бжъитӀу	гот
цу-м	бжъ-итӀу	го-т
[t͡sʷəm	bʐəjtʷʼ	ɡʷat]
ox (erg.)	two horns	it have on his body
"the ox have two horns."

шыор	шым	гос
шыо-р	шы-м	го-с
[ʃəwar	ʃəm	ɡʷas]
the horseman (abs.)	horse (erg.)	(s)he is sitting on a body
"the horseman is sitting on the horse."

лӀыжъым	зылъакъо	готэп
лӀыжъы-м	зы-лъакъо	го-тэ-п
[ɬʼəʐəm	zəɬaːqʷa	ɡʷatap]
the old man (erg.)	one leg	(s)he doesn't have on his body
"the old man doesn't have one leg."

шым	зеохьыжьым	кӀалэу	госэр	гозэгъ
шы-м	зеохьы-жь-ым	кӀалэ-у	го-сэ-р	го-зэ-гъ
[ʃəm	zajwaħəʑəm	t͡ʃʼaːɮaw	ɡʷasar	ɡʷazaʁ]
house (erg.)	to get out of control	boy (adv.)	the one on the body	(s)he fell off the body
"when the horse got out of control the boy sitting on it fell."

=== Imperative mood ===
In the imperative mood of the Shapsug dialect, unlike the literary Adyghe language, the vowel sound of the stem is generally preserved.

Adyghe literary language	Shapsug dialect	English translation
IукI!	IукIы!	go away! / leave!
еплъ!	еплъы!	look!
зэчIашI!	зэчIашIэ!	harness!

=== Circumstantial particles ===
The Adyghe verb includes not only personal indicators of the subject and object, but also affixes indicating the spatial position of the object, as well as a number of other formants expressing additional features of the course of the action. In terms of the composition of such formants, the Adyghe verb resembles an entire sentence.

The presence of the affix -ф- gives the word шIэн ("to do") a new lexical meaning, which cannot be conveyed by the affix шъу-.

Example in the Shapsug dialect	English translation
ЦIыфым уц рамышIэфыщтыгъэмэ, зэужэу сымаджэ хъурэ лIэни	If medicines were not applied to people, then all the sick would die

==== Formants of cause and purpose ====
One of the important circumstantial affixes is the formant of cause and purpose. In the Adyghe literary language, чIэ- is used, while in the Kabardian language, шIэ- is used (tracing back to the preverb чIэ-). The peculiarity of the Shapsug dialect lies in the fact that the circumstance of cause and purpose is expressed by the formant -ф- or a zero morpheme (as in the Bzhedug dialect) as a replacement for the formant чIэ-.

Language / Dialect	Example	English translation
Adyghe lit. lang.	Ахэр чIызэIуагъэчIагъэхэри, зэхэгущыIэжьыхэмэ щычIагъэу фэхъуыгъэр зэхафын, шIэгъэн, зыфэбэнэн фаехэр агъэнэфэныр ары.	They were gathered together to talk, to sort out the existing shortcomings, to outline what needs to be done, and what needs to be fought for.
Adyghe lit. lang.	Сэ сикъэкIуачIэ хъугъэмчIэ шъукъычIысэмыупчIырэр да?	Why don't you ask how I arrived?
Kabardian lang.	Сыт мы цIыкIухэр пшIантIэм шIыдэбгъэлыжыр?	Why are you starving these little ones in the yard?
Shapsug dialect	Хьадрыхэ рэкIуэхэрэ къызфэмыкIуэжьхэрэр, ащ щыIэчIэ дэгу щыряIэшъ ары.	Those who have gone to the other world do not return because they live well there.
Shapsug dialect	ЧIалэм зыфылъычэхэрэр раIуагъ.	They told the boy why they were running after him.
Shapsug dialect	Ур зыфэмыгупсэфырэ сшIэрэп.	Why he is not calm — I don't know.

Exception in interrogative sentences: In the Shapsug dialect, interrogative sentences do not contain circumstantial particles expressing cause. In such cases, causal-purpose relations can be expressed by the formant чIэ-, similarly to the literary language.

Shapsug dialect	Literary variant	English translation
Шъыдэу укIуагъ?	Сыд учIэкIуагъэр?	Why did you go?
Мы гьанэхэр шъыдэу уупчIэтагъэх?	мы джанэхэр да чIызэхэупчIэтагъэр?	Why did you cut these shirts?
Шъыдэу угърэ?	Сыда учIэгърэ?	Why are you crying?

==== Circumstance of time ====
In an infinite verb, the circumstance of time is expressed by the suffix -чIэ- in combination with the relative pronoun з- or the suffix -м and the pronoun з-.

Form	Example	English translation
Literary Adyghe	Асиети янэ заучIым, пшъэшъэ ебэм дэжь апэу къэкIуагъэр Дахэр ары.	When Asiyet's mother was killed, Dakhe came to the girl's grandmother first of all.

In the Shapsug dialect, the affixes з — м are predominantly used to express time. A verb with these affixes is infinite, so a finite verb (present, future, or past tense) must necessarily be present in the sentence.

Example in the Shapsug dialect	English translation
ПцыпIэм зытIысыжьырэм орэдыр къаIуэщтыгъ.	Then, when returning to the camp, they sang songs.
Зэужьэу изэу зишIрэм, щэкуанэм ышъхьэ ещхэжьи егъэуцужы.	Then, when everything is filled, it closes the eye and leaves it.
ЕтIанэ, къахьыжьини, тыгъэм радзыжьи зычэпхъыжьырэм агъэтхъы.	Then they bring it, put it in the sun and, when it dries, split it.

==== Circumstance of place ====
The formant -зд- denotes the circumstance of place (where to; where from; where). In the Shapsug dialect, зыщ and здыщ are used for this. In the Shapsug dialect, the specification of the meaning of the pronoun з- by preverbs is carried out more consistently than in the literary language.

Examples in the Shapsug dialect	Comparison with the literary form	English translation
ЧIалэр ежьы, а дышъэ такъырэр къыздыщигъуэтыгъэм кIуагъэ.	-	The guy set off, went to where he found that piece of gold.
ЛIыр здыфаем ежьэжьыгъ.	cf. lit. — зыфаем	The man went where he wanted.
Блэм здыфыкIуагъэм ычагъ.	cf. lit. — зыфиIуагъэм	The snake led him where he said.
Уздыфаем укIуэщт.	cf. lit. — узыфаем	You will go where you want.

==== Circumstance of condition ====
The circumstance of condition in the literary language is expressed by the affix з—чI (less often з—м), whereas in the Shapsug dialect it is denoted exclusively by means of з—м.

Example in the Shapsug dialect	English translation
Ахэр къысфапщи, рэкIуэнэу зысмышIрэм шъукъаплъэ.	Call them for me, if I don't make them go, see for yourselves.
Уфаемэ тэди къэхы, къызыумыгъотырэм, пшъхьэ пязгъэлъэщт.	Get it wherever you want, if you don't find it — I'll hang your head.

=== Formants of infiniteness ===
In the Adyghe literary language, the formants of infiniteness are: -и, -шъ, -эу, -ти and others. The affixes -и, -ти, -шъ indicate that the action of the infinite verb precedes the action of the finite verb, while the affix -эу expresses an action that occurs simultaneously with the action of the finite verb.

Examples of literary infinite constructions	English translation
Чэчанэ чIым ынапэ тетмэ псаоу, гъэры хъугъэми, учIыгъэу хьадзу щытми зэтымыгъэгъотэу ыужы тичIынэп! — аIуишъ ежьэгъэх.	If Chechan is alive on earth, whether he is a captive, or a dead corpse, without finding him, we will not stop! — they said and set off.
Сыдми тыгъуэжъышъхьэхэр къашти ежьэжьыгъэх.	Be that as it may, they took the wolf heads and set off.
СкIоцI мэузышъ, бэджынэ стыррэ шъоу цIынэрэ зэхэлъэу сшхы сшIоигъоу сыгу къэчIыгъ.	Inside I ache, and therefore I want to eat hot gruel (bedzhyne) together with honey.
Хьакъу-шыкъухэр зэIысхыжьыщтхэшъ, сызыпылъын-хэри щыIэхэшъ, сэ укъысэмыжэу шхэ.	Since I have to clean the dishes and since, in addition, I have things to do, do not wait for me, eat.
ЗекIуэ гъуэмылэм ишIычIэ фэIэзти къыфишIыгъ.	Since she was skilled in preparing camp food, she prepared it for him.

==== Infiniteness in the Shapsug dialect ====
In the Shapsug dialect, the affix -шъ is completely absent and is replaced by others, with the most common affixes of infiniteness being -и and -ри. By the method of expressing infiniteness, the Shapsug dialect is close to the Kabardian language.

Infiniteness in the Shapsug dialect exhibits many unique affix replacements:

Grammatical Feature	Example	English translation
Pure verb stem and auxiliary words	КъэкIуэжьэ зэхъуым пщым... ыIуагъ.	When he returned, the prince... said!
Pure verb stem and auxiliary words	Линейкэм исэу рэчэхэ пэтэу къилъэгъугъ.	Sitting in the line carriage, as they were riding, he saw.
-го (instead of literary -эу)	Мыр хапскIэго макIуэ.	(No translation provided in text)
-горэ (instead of literary -эу)	Лошадь идет подпрыгивая.	The horse walks bouncing. (Russian translation only provided)
-горэ (instead of literary -эу)	Пшъашъэр ежьы рэкIуэгорэ чылем дэлъ хъэбарымыгъэ еупчIыгъ.	The girl set off and, walking, asked about the news in the village.
-горэ (instead of literary -эу)	КIуэгорэ Дышъэхьан ячау дэхьагъ.	Walking, entered Dyshehan's yard.
-гозэ (instead of literary -зэ)	Къэтжъыер ныбгъуэм къырахы, агъэшхэгуэзэ апIу.	They take the chick out of the nest, feed it and raise it.
-гозэ (instead of literary -зэ)	Дэжъыеу къычIэкIырэр псычIэлъэм етэлъхьай, Iэджэ зэIытшIэу тыутхыпчIыгозэ шIойсапэр чIэтэгъэчIы.	We put the extracted nuts into a box, stir them with a stick, shake them and sift the dust.
-гозэгъу (instead of literary -зэ)	Ащ чIэсхэзэгъу багъуэхи, мэчIэ-мачIэу къылъыкIуатэгозэгъу, абдзахэхэр ТуыбэчIэ загъэхэрэм къэсыгъэх.	Living there, they multiplied and gradually moving, reached the place called Abadzekh Tuboi.
-гозэгъу (instead of literary -зэ)	Аущтэу чIэтгозэгъу зы уахътэ горэм, пчыхьэшъхьэпэ горэм, тIысыжьыгъэхэу, шхэнхэ агу хэлъгозэгъу чIэсэу пщэрахьыр афэпщэрахыгъ.	Thus living, once, on a certain evening, having sat down, having in mind to eat, while they were sitting, the cook prepared for them.
-зэгъу (meaning -зэ)	Бжъэм емышъоу къэбарыжъы ыIуатэгозэгъугъэ: — Ешъу Щэбартын, уэ фэшъхьафи ешъуэщт".	Not drinking from the goblet, he told stories: "Drink, Shebartyn, besides you, others will drink too."
-зэгъу (joined directly)	...ЕтIуанэ а псыр мэчIэ-мэчIэээ ихьажьзэгъу кIуэдыжьыгъэу илъэгъуыгъ.	...then the water gradually went back in, disappeared — so he saw.
-зэгъу (joined directly)	ЧыбжъыичIэр тIэгу итэлъхьай чIэдгъэтэкъуризэгъу зэфэдэу тэтакъуэ чыгу гъэшъэбагъэм.	We take the pepper seeds in our hands, pour them out, equally scatter them on the soft earth.
-зэгъу (joined directly)	Чыгуэр дэгъоу бгъэшъэбэни, бжыныкIэ шIусIэ иуутыни, зэIыпшIэни пхъэчахъуэгъэ, псы тэбгъэхъуэзэпытыризэгъу, Iэпхъуабэ щызы икIьахъуэгъэу хъуыфэ нэсы, аущтэу удызэкIуэ зэпытыщт.	You loosen the earth well, sow onion seeds, stir with a rake, constantly watering with water, until it grows to the size of a finger, you will constantly look after them.
-ри (instead of lit. -и, -ти, -эу)	Хьакъуашъуэм фэдэу ашIи, бжьэр ащ датIупщхэри, щыпсаоу дэсыщтыгъ.	They make it like a drinking bowl, let the bees in there, and they live there.
-ри (instead of lit. -и, -ти, -эу)	Адэ сэ сызэрэфэкIуагъэм фэдэу ахэр гъакIуэри къэкIуэжьхэмэ еплъъ.	As I went for you, let them go and see if they return.
-ри (instead of lit. -и, -ти, -эу)	ЫIэгу ригъэткIуэри, ышъхьэ щырифэ ыублагъ.	Poured into his hands and began to rub his head.
-ри (instead of lit. -и, -ти, -эу)	Мафэ къэсым чым ыдэжьы рэкIуэри еплъакIуэщтыгъ.	Every day he went to the cow and watched.
-ри (instead of lit. -и, -ти, -эу)	ЧIалэр кIуи, уэтэжъые цIыкIугъэ тэуэри, къикIиуахэри Iутоу къэущыжьыгъэх.	The guy went, and when he knocked with a small hammer, and told stories, they woke up.
-пэтэу (used with -ри)	Шы табунэр къифри къэкIуэжьэу, а пшъэшъэфуэм ячылагъуэ иплъагъуэ къихьэжьыгъ.	Returning with a herd of horses, he drove up to the vicinity of the big girl's village.
-пэтэу (used with -ри)	Сэрадынэ рэкIуэри пэтэу ипэгъэ зэплъэм, лIы горэ къакIуэ.	When Seradyn, walking, looked ahead: a certain man is walking.
-пэтэу (used with -ри)	ЧIалэр бгъоджым ихьагъэу рэкIуэри пэтэу зы унэ-фыжыуфэ горэ илъэгъугъ.	The guy went into the field, walking, he saw a big house.
-горэгъэ / -горэмгъэ	ЕтIуанэ рэкIуэхэгорэгъэ цуакъэр зыухрэм къагъэзэжыщтыгъ.	Then, walking, when the chuvyaki (shoes) wore out, they returned.
-горэгъэ / -горэмгъэ	РэкIуэхэмэ рэкIуэхэгорэгъэ шъуэф горэм ихьагъэх, чъыгыфуэ горэ итэу.	Walking, they went into a steppe, a big tree was standing there.
-горэгъэ / -горэмгъэ	РэкIуахэгорэмгъэ зы лIы горэм епшцэгъорэмгъэ шъхьалы игъэхьаджэу алъэгъугъ. РэкIуэхэгорэмгъэ бгы зэтэгъащэм IуычIагъэх, рэкIуэхэгорэмгъэ ар чыг зэтэгъащэм IуычIагъэх.	Walking, they met a man who blew and set the mill in motion. Walking, they met one who twisted mountains, walking they met one who twisted trees.
-й (instead of literary -шъ)	Натмэ ешхэ-ешъуэ яIэй, Щэбатынэ ашэщт.	Since the Narts have a feast, they will invite Shebatyn.
-й (instead of literary -шъ)	Псы лэгъупыиблыр агъэжъуэй, гъуэплъэ хьакъуашъуэм рагъэхъуэй, псIанэу зашIэй, псычIэгърысгъэ чIахьи адыгъэ чIэсычIыжьы.	They boil seven cauldrons of water, pour it into a copper trough, undress, go into the water and float to the other side.

=== Participles ===
In the Shapsug dialect, a peculiar form is derived from the stem of present tense participles by means of the affix -гъу, which indicates the desire of the speaker. For example, from the intransitive verb кIуэн ("to go") comes кIуэр ("going"), and from that кIуэрагъу ("he is wishing to go"). From the transitive verb къыщэн ("to bring") comes къыщэрагъу ("he is wishing to bring him").

This participial form changes by person like a subjective participle (e.g., сыкIуэрагъу — "I am wishing to go", укIуэрагъу — "you are wishing to go"). However, it does not change by tenses; the time of the action is denoted with the help of the auxiliary verb хъуын ("to become") (e.g., сыкIуэрагъоу сыхъущт — "I will be wishing to go"). The Temirgoy and other dialects lack this morphological form, and the speaker's desire in those dialects is expressed descriptively (e.g., сыкIуэнэу сыфай — "I want to go").

Example in the Shapsug dialect	English translation
Сигъусэхэр щакIуэ макIуэх, сэри сыкIуэрагъу.	My companions go hunting, and I am wishing to go.
ТIэкIу рэчиерагъу хъугъэ.	He slightly became wishing to sleep.
Джарары сызэрэбгъэджэгуыщтыгъэр, уыджэгуырагъуымэ.	This is how you should play with me, if you wish to play.

=== Particles ===
==== Affirmative Particle ====
The affirmative particle -а is observed in the Shapsug dialect in both static and dynamic verbs. It often appears in exclamatory sentences, where the affirmative meaning is further underscored by the amplifying particles -е and -ет.

Example in the Shapsug dialect	English translation
Уэлахьэ бэу тыIэящэм, сызэплъыжы шъхьа!	I look at myself, but I am already very ugly!
Ет, Болэтыкъуэр Джанкъылыщ, къэхъугъа, ыджи щыIа!	By God, Botoqwa Jankilisch was born and exists!
О лъэпщ, къыситына!	Oh blacksmith god, give me!
Е дэгъоу ар рэджэхъа!	Oh good, he will fly!
Е дэгъоу ар мэкъу еуа!	Oh good, he mows hay!
Сэ чым сытэс, мор лъэчэ дэд, къэсыубытына!	I sit on a horse, that one is very lame, of course, I will catch him!
Е дэгъоу къэпхьыгъа!	Good, what you brought!

==== Interrogative Particle ====
In the Adyghe literary language in interrogative-affirmative forms, a question is expressed through intonation and the interrogative particle -а. In the Shapsug dialect, the interrogative particle -а can be absent in interrogative sentences, and the question is then expressed solely by intonation, which differs significantly from other dialects: due to the absence of the particle -а, the vowel of the last stressed syllable is lengthened, typically without sharp rises and falls in pitch.

Example in the Shapsug dialect	English translation
Зулихьан къыхьыгъэр тхыльа?	Is it a book that Zulikhan brought?
Зулихьана тхылъ къэзыхьыгъэр?	Did Zulikhan bring the book?
Махьмуды шъыд ышIэу дэс?	Mahmud, what is he doing sitting?
Мы лIыжъ цIыкIум шъыд ыIуэшъуын?	What can this old man say?
Тэ ущыIагъ ыгьи нэс?	Where were you up to now?

==== Vocative and Amplifying Particles ====
When addressing names that designate individuals, they sometimes end in -а in the Shapsug dialect. If the name already ends in a vowel, this sound is placed under stress when addressed. Unlike the literary language, amplifying particles like е and ет are observed, and the names of pagan gods act as amplifying-confirming particles, such as Емыш (god of sheep breeding) and Лъэпщ (god of blacksmithing).

Grammatical Feature	Example	English translation
Vocative particle (-а)	Тыщхъана!	Tyshkhan (proper name)!
Vocative particle (-а)	Тэтэжъа!	Grandfather!
Stressed ending	чIалэ́, щызагъ!	Boy, stop!
Amplifying particle	Ет, мый дышъэ хэлъми хэмыгъотэын!	Even if there is gold here, you will not find it!
Amplifying particle	Е дэгъоу къэпхьыгъа!	Good, what you brought!
Amplifying particle	Е сымыкIуэн!	Not for anything will I go!
Amplifying particle	Е сичIал!	Oh my boy!
Pagan gods as particles	Емыш, тышкIэ къэмыкIуэжьын ульэмыкIоу!	By Eymish (By God), our calf will not return if you don't go after it!
Pagan gods as particles	Емыш, мы езбырэр зэбгъэшIагъэмэ къыпшъхьапэжьына!	If you learned this by heart, it would be useful to you!
Pagan gods as particles	Лъэпщ, къысэптына!	Of course, you will give!
Repeated amplifying word	Е зыпарэ закъун сыгу хэлъыгъэп.	I thought of nothing.

=== Conjunctions ===
A unique rearrangement of the conjunction -рэ is observed in the Shapsug dialect. Typically, -рэ attaches to the stem of words, but in Shapsug, -рэ is placed *before* the determinative suffix -м, though speakers do not notice this rearrangement and correct inquiries to the literary sequence.

Grammatical Feature	Example	English translation
Conjunction -рэ (lit.)	Умаррэ Къэплъанрэ	Umar and Kaplan.
Conjunction -рэ (Shapsug)	Мышъэрэмэ тыгъужъэрэмэ зэIукIагъэх.	The bear and the wolf met.
Conjunction -рэ (Shapsug)	ЧIалэрэмэ ЛIыжъэрэмэ пхъэ акъутэ.	The guy and the old man chop wood.

The repeating conjunction -и can appear as -икIь, similar to the Kabardian language. Negative pronouns are formed by adding the numeral "one" or pronoun stems with the conjunction -кIь, instead of -и as in other dialects:

Grammatical Feature	Shapsug dialect	Literary / Temirgoy	English translation
Repeating conjunction -икIь	ЧыухэрикIь лъэсхэрикIь гъуэгу зэфэшъхьафхэмэ арыкIуагъэх.	-	The horsemen and the footmen went along different roads.
Repeating conjunction -икIь	Ыпэ рапшIэу зым лэгъэнэри ыIыгъэу къуымгъанрикIь ыIыгъэу къакIуэх.	-	First one holds a basin and holds a jug, and they come.
Negative pronouns	ЗикIь	Зи	nothing, nobody
Negative pronouns	хэтмикIь	хэтми	whoever it may be

The conjunction нэмыIэми ("although") is presented in three ways in Shapsug: мыIэми ("although"), нэмыIэми (like in literary), and ныIэмыIэми.

Example in the Shapsug dialect	English translation
Байм ыкъуэ сымэгъэ дэй нахь мыIэми, зимыаджалэр рэхъуыжьэу хабзэти хъуыжыгъэ.	The son of the rich man, although he was severely ill, but usually he whose death has not approached recovers, and he recovered.
СыцIыкIу ныIэп мыIэми, сыкIуэни сятэ ибылымыхэми арыкIуэрэр къызэзгъэшIэн.	Although I am small, I will go and find out what is done with my father's property.

=== Interjections ===
The Adyghe language is characterized by a wealth of interjections, particularly onomatopoeic ones. In the Shapsug dialect, many interjections modify based on conditions and the nature of the sound being imitated.

Interjection	Type/Meaning	Notes
Иу! Их!	Expresses surprise	Characteristic of the villages of Kirov and Khadzhiko.
Гущэ	Expresses regret	-
А пшъышъ	Expresses delight or terror	Meaning depends heavily on intonation.
Яль	Expresses surprise	-
Жъэу	Vocative interjection	Used for calling out.
Уй	Response to a call	-
гъытхъ	Onomatopoeic	Imitates the sound of a wolf.
пыхъ-чырхъ	Onomatopoeic	Imitates the sound of a bear.
уархъ	Onomatopoeic	Imitates the sound of a pig.
цIыры-щыры	Onomatopoeic	Imitates the sound of birds.
къуах	Onomatopoeic	Imitates the sound of a shot.
цау	Onomatopoeic	Imitates the sound of a knock.
тIыркъу-щыркъу	Onomatopoeic	Imitates the sound of footsteps.

These onomatopoeic interjections are widely used in riddles in the Shapsug dialect.

Riddle Example	English translation
Уэдэдае къыхэзи, уэдэмэзы къыхафэ (дэ).	From Uededa falls into the forest (nut).
ТIыркIу-блыкIу зэтэс, фас паIуэ шъхьагъ (Iэпхъуабэм хьакустэлы пысэу).	All in bumps, on the head — a fez (finger with a thimble).

== Vocabulary ==
Meaning	Shapsug		Standard Adyghe	
Meaning	Cyrillic	IPA	Cyrillic	IPA
all	зэужь, купэ	zawəʑ, kʷəpa	зэкӀэ	zat͡ʃʼa
to miss someonme	кӀэхъопсын		уфэзэщын	
everyone everything	псэуми	psawəməj	пстэуми	pstawəməj
to chew	упэшъын ушъэпын	wəpaʃʼən	гъэунэшкӀун	ʁawnaʃkʷʼən
to push	егукӀэн	jagʷət͡ʃʼan	еӀункӀэн	jaʔʷənt͡ʃʼan
funny	гушӀуагъэ	gʷəʃʷʼaːʁa	щхэны	ɕxanə
to laugh	гушӀон	gʷəʃʷʼan	щхын	ɕxən
to smile	гушӀопсӀын	gʷəʃʷʼapsʼənn	щхыпцӀын	ɕxəpt͡sʼən
to get sad	зэгожъын	zagʷaʐən	нэшхъэин	naʃχanjən
to laugh at	щыгушӀукӀьн	ɕʷgʷəʃʷʼəkʲʼəən	дэхьащхын	daħaːɕxən
to unbuckle	гъэтӀэпкӀьын	ʁatʼapkʲʼən	тIэтэн; птӀэтэн;	tʼatan
to lower	гъэшъхъын	ʁaʂχən	еуфэхын	-
to lower oneself	зыгъэшъхъын	ʁaʂχən	зыуфэн, зеуфэхын, зегъэзыхын	-
lowered	гъэшъхъыгъэ	ʁaʂχəʁa	лъхъанчэ	ɬχaːnat͡ʃa
walnut	дэ	da	дэшхо	daʃxʷa
back of the neck	дий	dəj	пшъэб	pʂab
drum	даулэ домбаз	dawəla dawmbaz	шъондырып	ʃʷandərəp
to fall down	етӀэрэхын	jatʼaraxən	ефэхын	jafaxən
to arrange	зэгъэфэн	zaʁafan	гъэкӀэрэкӀэн	ʁat͡ʃʼarat͡ʃʼan
smell	гъуамэ	ʁʷaːma	мэ	ma
stairs	лъэугъуае	ɬawʁʷaːja	лъэой	ɬawaj
bucket	къуао	qʷaːwa	щалъ	ɕaːɬ
to left (left over)	къыдэфэн	qədafan	къэнэжьын	qanaʑən
thorn	къэцы	qat͡sə	панэ	paːna
axe	майтэ	maːjta	отыч	watət͡ʃ
apple	мые	məja	мыӀэрыс	məʔarəs
intestine	ныпсӀэ	nəpsʼa	кӀэтӀэй	t͡ʃatʼaj
flower	нэкъыгъэ	naqəʁa	къэгъагъэ	qaʁaːʁa
to plant	тӀэн	tʼan	гъэтӀысын	ʁatʼəsən
big	фуэ	fwa	шхо	ʃxʷa
tip	цыпэ	t͡səpa	пакIэ	-
to crawl	цӀэлъэн	t͡sʼaɬan	пшын	pʃən
to breathe	фэпщэн	fapɕən	жьы къэщэн	ɕə qaɕan
sharp	чыян	t͡ʃʼəjaːn	чан	t͡ʃʼaːn
coward	щтапхэ	ɕtaːpxa	къэрабгъэ	qaraːbʁa
to block a hole	шъыбын	ʂəbənto	кудэн	kʷədan
jug	шъхьахъу	ʂħaːχʷ	къошын	qʷaʃən
small thing	шъхъэ	ʂχa	жъгъэй	ʐʁaj
soft	щынэ	ɕəna	шъабэ	ʂaːba
clabber	щэгъэпсӀагъ	ɕaʁapsʼaːʁ	щхыу	ɕa
milk	щэзэн	ɕazan	щэ	ɕa
bag; sack	щэуалэ	ɕawaːɮa	дзыо; къапщыкъ	d͡zəwa; qapɕəq
ships	хьаджыгъэпс	ħaːd͡ʒəʁaps	щыпс	ɕəps
mataz	мэтазэ	mataːza	псыхьалыжъо	psəħaːɮəʒʷa
batterfly	хьадрэпӀый (or хьатрэпӀый)	ħaːdrapʼəj	хьампӀырашъу	ħaːmpʼəraːʃʷ
bat	пхъэпӀырашъу (or пхъэмпӀырашъу)	pχaːpʼəraːʃʷ	чэщбзэу	t͡ʃʼaɕbzaw
mole	лъышъутӀэ (or лышъутӀэ)	ɬəʃʷtʼa	лыпцӀэ	ləpʼt͡sʼa
doll	нысэпхъапэ	nəsapχaːpa	нысхъап	nəsχaːp
easy	ӀэшӀэх	ʔaʃʼax	псынкӀэ	psənt͡ʃʼa
gloves	Ӏэбыцу	ʔabət͡ʃʷ	Ӏалъ	ʔaːɬ
to be digested with	щыпэгэн			
to be digested with	щымэхъэщэн			
to run a distance of	ичъын			
to bug someone	ерышэ ш1ын			

== Shapsugh alphabet ==
The alphabet used as the language of writing and literature in Shapsug national raion and Kfar Kama between 1924 and 1945 is as follows:

А а	Б б	В в	Г г	Гу гу	Гъ гъ	Гъу гъу	Гь гь	Д д	Дж дж
Дз дз	Е е	Ж ж	Жъ жъ	Жъу жъу	Жь жь	Жьу жьу	З з	И и	Й й
К к	Ку ку	Къ къ	Къу къу	Кь кь	КӀ кӀ	КӀу кӀу	КIь кIь	Л л	Лъ лъ
ЛӀ лӀ	М м	Н н	О о	П п	ПӀ пӀ	ПӀу пӀу	Р р	С с	СӀ сӀ
Т т	ТӀ тӀ	ТӀу тӀу	У у	Ф ф	Х х	Хъ хъ	Хъу хъу	Хь хь	Ц ц
ЦӀ цӀ	Ч ч	Чу чу	КӀ кӀ	Ш ш	Шъ шъ	Щу щу	ШӀ шӀ	ШӀу шӀу	Щ щ
Ы ы	Э э	Ӏ Ӏ	Ъ ъ	Ь ь	Ӏу Ӏу	Я я	Ю ю	Ё ё

== Sample text ==
ПсэкӀодишъэ Зыгъэхъагъэр :

Сэтэнай-гуащэ ныо рэхъугъэу, е ыкӀуакӀэ къыщыкӀагъэу, е ынэгу зэлъагъэу цӀыф къыӀуатэу хэти зэхихыгъэп. Зэхихына, — Сэтэнае егъашӀи жъы рэхъугъэп! МыӀэрысэм ыку фыжьэу тхъу сӀынэм фэдэр ынэгу щифэти; — фыжьыбзэу, ышъо жъыутэхэу къабзэу, моу укъищэу рэхъущтыгъэ; ышъуапӀэ ыжъоу, ащ ыпс ригъашъорэр — ыгугьэ кьэфэу, хьалэлэу, гукӀьегъуфо хэлъэу ышӀэущтыгъ. Ащ фэдэ мыӀэрысэ Нат ябын зэриӀэр Емынэжъ ышӀагъ.; Арыти, нэшъоу зишӀи, лъащэу зишӀи Сэтэнай-гуащэ дэжь къэкӀуагъ.

— Сэтэнай! — ыӀуи къегьагъ Емынэжъ,

— Шъыд? — ыӀожьыгъ Сэтэнае,

— Слъакъомэ сахьыжьырэп, сынэмэ алъэгъужьырэп, сшъхьэ акъыл чыян илъыжьэп, сыгугьэ мэхъаджэ сыхъугъ, гъашӀэу къысфэнэжьыгъэри макӀэ. Джэуап къысфэхъу! — ыӀуагъ Емынэжъы. — УимыӀэрысэфо ищэнсэн сэмышӀэу уенэгуя?!.

— Сэ симыӀэрысэфо ишӀуагъэ къыокӀьыщтэп, — ыӀуагъ Сэтэнай-гуащэ. — О жъалымэгъэ бащэ зэпхьагъ.

Ӏэзэгъу къыритыгъэп.

«Ащ ишӀуагъэ сэ къысэмыкӀьынэу щытмэ, шъори къышъозгъэкӀьынэп!» — ыӀуи, чэщ горэм къекӀуашъи Нат ябын идышъэ мыӀэрысэ чыг Емынэжъы риупкӀыгь. А чыгэр яӀагъэемэ, нэпэ къагу натхэр псэоу, тхъэжьэу, жъы рэмыхъухэу щыӀэнхи!.

== See also ==
- Hakuchi Adyghe dialect
- Hatuqay dialect
- Bzhedug Adyghe dialect
- Abzakh Adyghe dialect
- Baslaney dialect

== Sources ==
- Kerasheva, Z. I. (1957). Особенности шапсугского диалекта адыгейского языка [Features of the Shapsug Dialect of the Adyghe Language] (in Russian). Maykop: Adyghe Book Publishing House (Адыгейское книжное издательство).
