= Circassians in Israel =

Circassian diaspora in Israel

Adyghe: Израилым ис Адыгэхэр Hebrew: הצ'רקסים בישראל
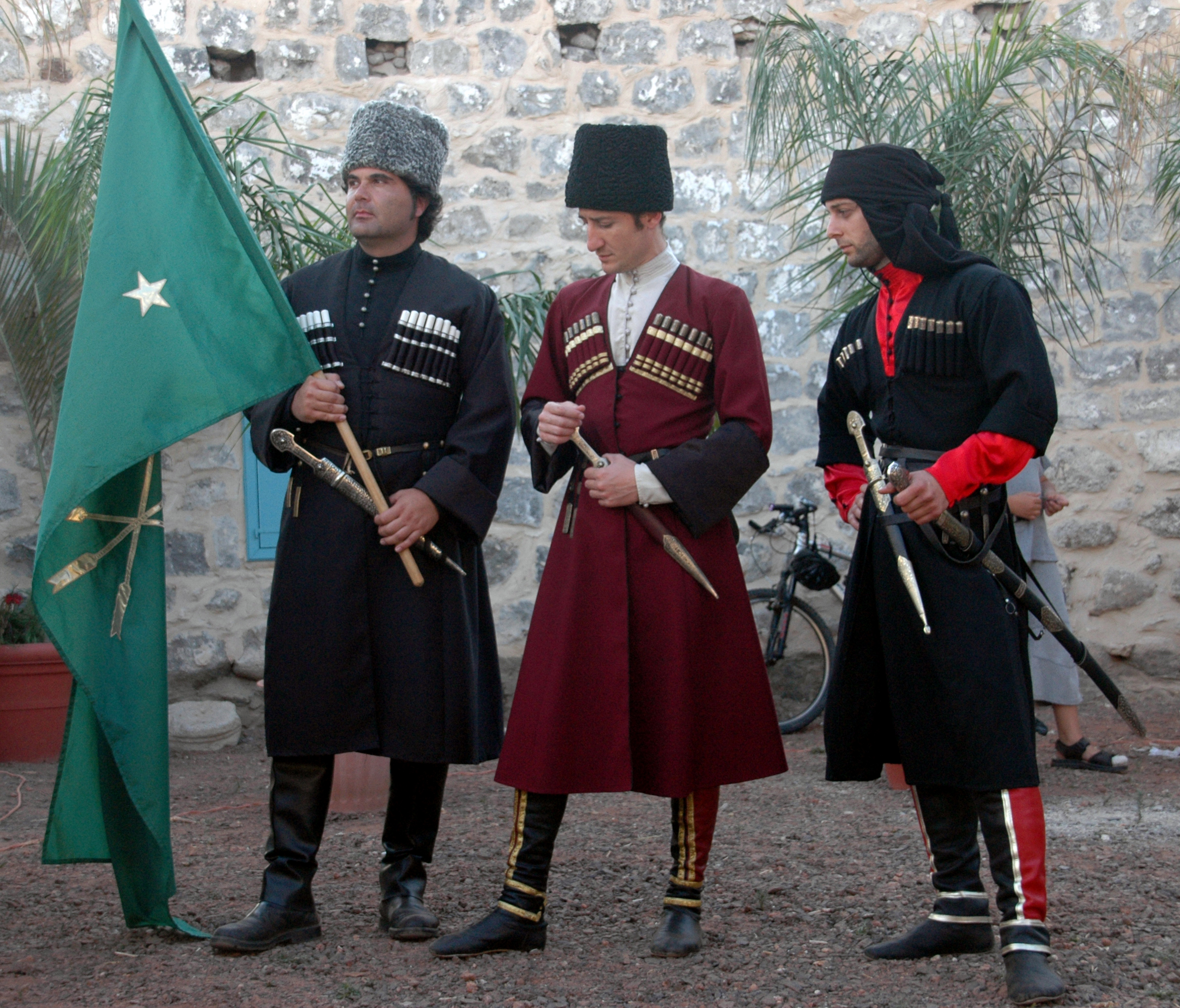
- Israeli Circassians in traditional ceremonial clothing with the Circassian national flag, 2010

Total population
- c. 4,000–5,000

Regions with significant populations
- Israel (Kfar Kama and Rehaniya)

Languages
- Adyghe (Shapsug dialect, Abzakh dialect) – native, Arabic (Levantine Arabic, Palestinian Arabic), Israeli Hebrew (L2), English (L3)

Religion
- Predominantly Sunni Islam

Related ethnic groups
- other Circassians, North Caucasians

About 4,000–5,000 ethnic Circassians are citizens and residents of Israel. They live primarily in two towns: Kfar Kama (Кфар Кама), and Rehaniya (Рихьаные).

The Circassians of Palestine, and later Israel, are a branch of the Circassian diaspora, which was formed as a consequence of the 19th-century Circassian genocide that was carried out by the Russian Empire during the Russo-Circassian War; Circassians are a Northwest Caucasian ethnic group and a nation; who natively speak the Circassian languages and originate from the historical country-region of Circassia in the North Caucasus.

Most Israeli Circassians adhere largely to the Sunni branch of Islam. They are descended from two Circassian diaspora groups who were settled in the Galilee by the Ottoman Empire in the 1870s.

Circassians are one of only two minority groups in Israel (alongside the Druze) from whom conscripts are drawn for compulsory military service in the Israel Defense Forces (IDF).

== History ==
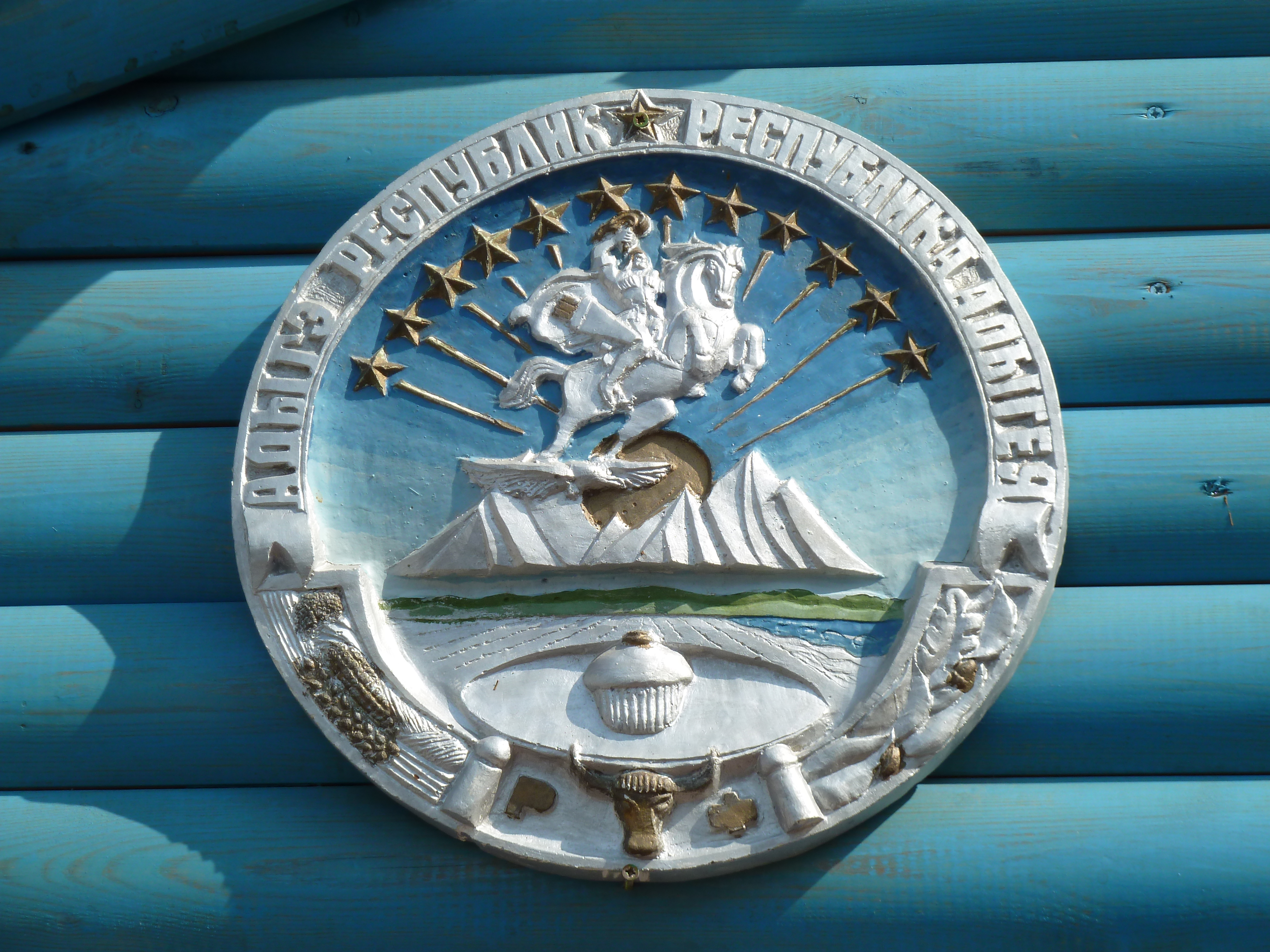
Coat of Arms of Adygea in the Circassian Heritage Center of Kfar Kama

=== Ottoman era ===
Circassia was a Christian land for 1,000 years, but from the 16th century to the 19th century, they were Islamized under the influence of Crimean Tatars and Ottoman Turks. The Circassians arrived in the Middle East after they were expelled from their homeland in the northwestern Caucasus. The Circassians, who fought during the Russo-Circassian War in the mid-to-late 19th century against the Russian Empire which captured the northern Caucasus, were massacred and expelled by tsarist Russia from the Caucasus. The Ottoman Empire, which saw the Circassians as experienced fighters, absorbed them in their territory and settled them in sparsely populated areas, including the Galilee.

The Circassian exiles established Rehaniya (nine miles north of Safed) in 1878, and Kfar Kama (13 miles southwest of Tiberias) in 1876. After having been deported a second time, this time from the Balkans, by Russia, Ottoman authorities settled Circassians in areas of the Levant as a bulwark against the Bedouins and Druze, who had at times resisted Ottoman rule as well as any hint of Arab nationalism, while avoiding settling Circassians among the Maronites due to the international problems it could cause.

At first, the Circassian settlers faced many challenges. The Bedouin viewed them as "squatters" of their pastures and appropriators of their springs, as well as pro-Ottoman agents placed there to undermine their autonomy, and Arab nationalism as it emerged tended to regard Circassians with suspicion; Circassian culture occasionally clashed with Arab mores as well, with local Arabs looking with horror upon the public dancing of Circassian men and women mixed together in festivals. At the time, Ottoman rule of the area was light and there was no real government and no law enforcement, and in various areas of the wider Levant region armed conflict not infrequently broke out between Circassians and other local groups, especially Bedouin and Druze groups in Syria, occasionally with little or no Ottoman intervention; some of these feuds continued as late as the mid-20th century The Chechen community of Syria, which had arrived at the same time as the Circassians, were nearly wiped out by disease, war, and destruction by 1880. However, in Northern Palestine, the Circassians prevailed and European travelers praised their "advanced agricultural methods" and skill in animal husbandry.

Throughout the time of the Ottoman Empire, Circassians kept to themselves and maintained their separate identity, even having their own courts, in which they would tolerate no outside influence, and various travelers noted that they never forgot their homeland, for which they continually yearned.

=== British Mandate ===
Circassians in Palestine maintained good relations with the Yishuv and later the Jewish community in Israel, in part due to the language shared with many of the First Aliyah immigrants from Russia who settled in the Galilee. Circassians and Jews also sympathized with each other's histories of exile. When conflict between Jews and Arabs began during the British Mandate, the Circassians most often took either neutral or pro-Jewish stances.

The 1922 census of Palestine lists 656 Circassian language speakers (3 in the Southern District, 9 in Jerusalem-Jaffa, and 641 in the Northern District), including 15 in municipal areas (3 in Jerusalem, 3 in Jaffa, 5 in Haifa, 1 in Tiberias, and 3 in Beersheba).

=== State of Israel ===
Members of the Circassian community fought alongside the Haganah against Arab forces in the Galilee during the 1948 Arab–Israeli War. A separate Circassian cavalry squadron fought in the war on the Israeli side; it was later used to suppress smuggling from Lebanon and was eventually disbanded.. At their community leaders' request, since 1958, all male Circassians must complete the mandatory military service in the Israel Defense Forces upon reaching the age of majority, while females do not, mainly due to cultural difference. In this, they are equal to the Israeli Druze population living in the State of Israel, while both men and women serve among Israeli Jews. The percentage of the army recruits among the Circassian community in Israel is particularly high. Many Circassians also serve in the Israel National Police, Israel Border Police, and the Israel Prison Service.

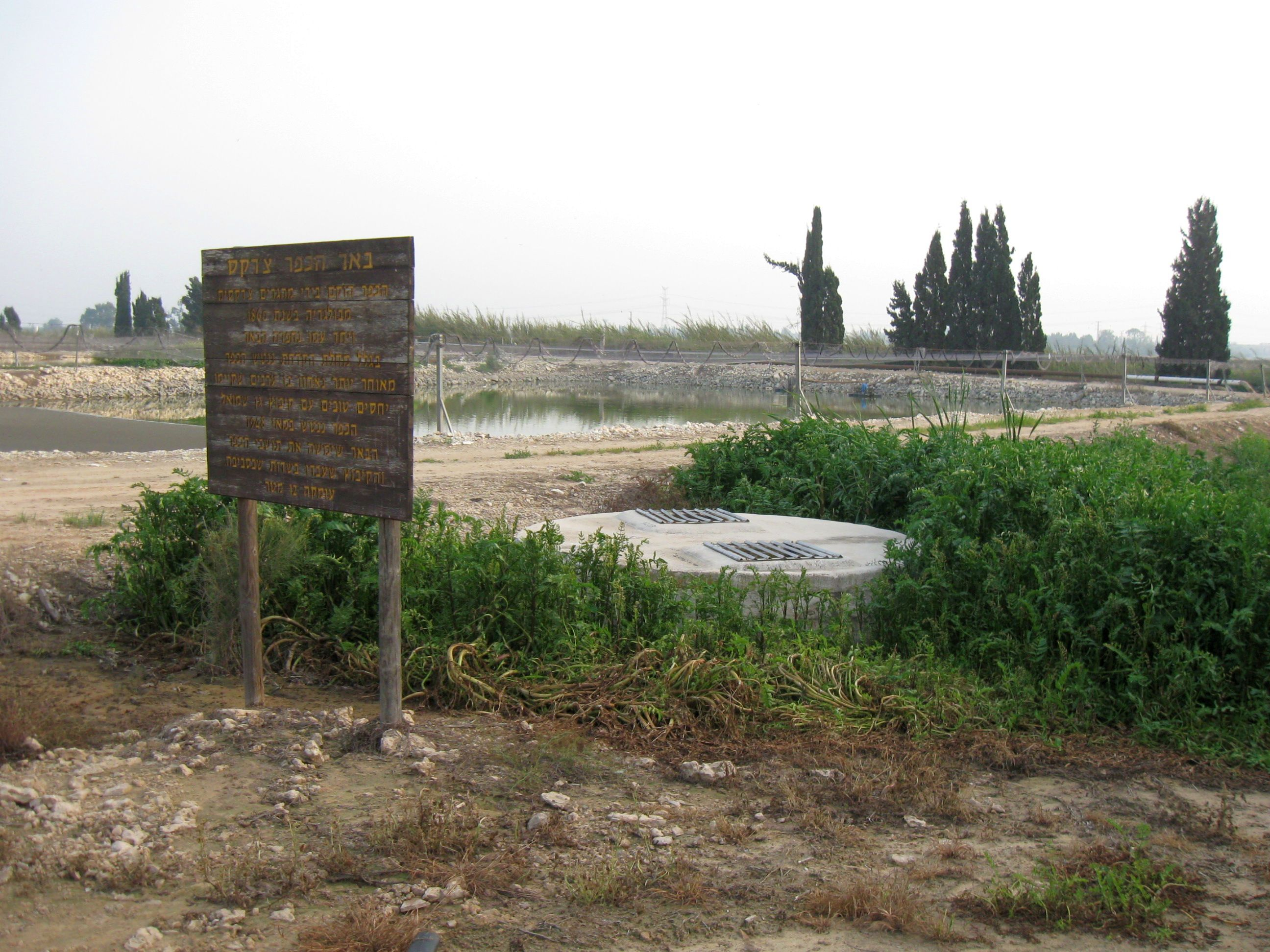
Site of Circassian village established in 1860, abandoned due to malaria

In 1976, the Circassian community won the right to maintain its own educational system separate from the Israeli government's Department of Arab Affairs. As a result, the community manages its own separate educational system, which ensures that its culture is passed down to the younger generations. In 2011, a bill was passed by the Knesset to allocate NIS 680 million to the development of education, tourism, and infrastructure in Circassian and Druze villages.

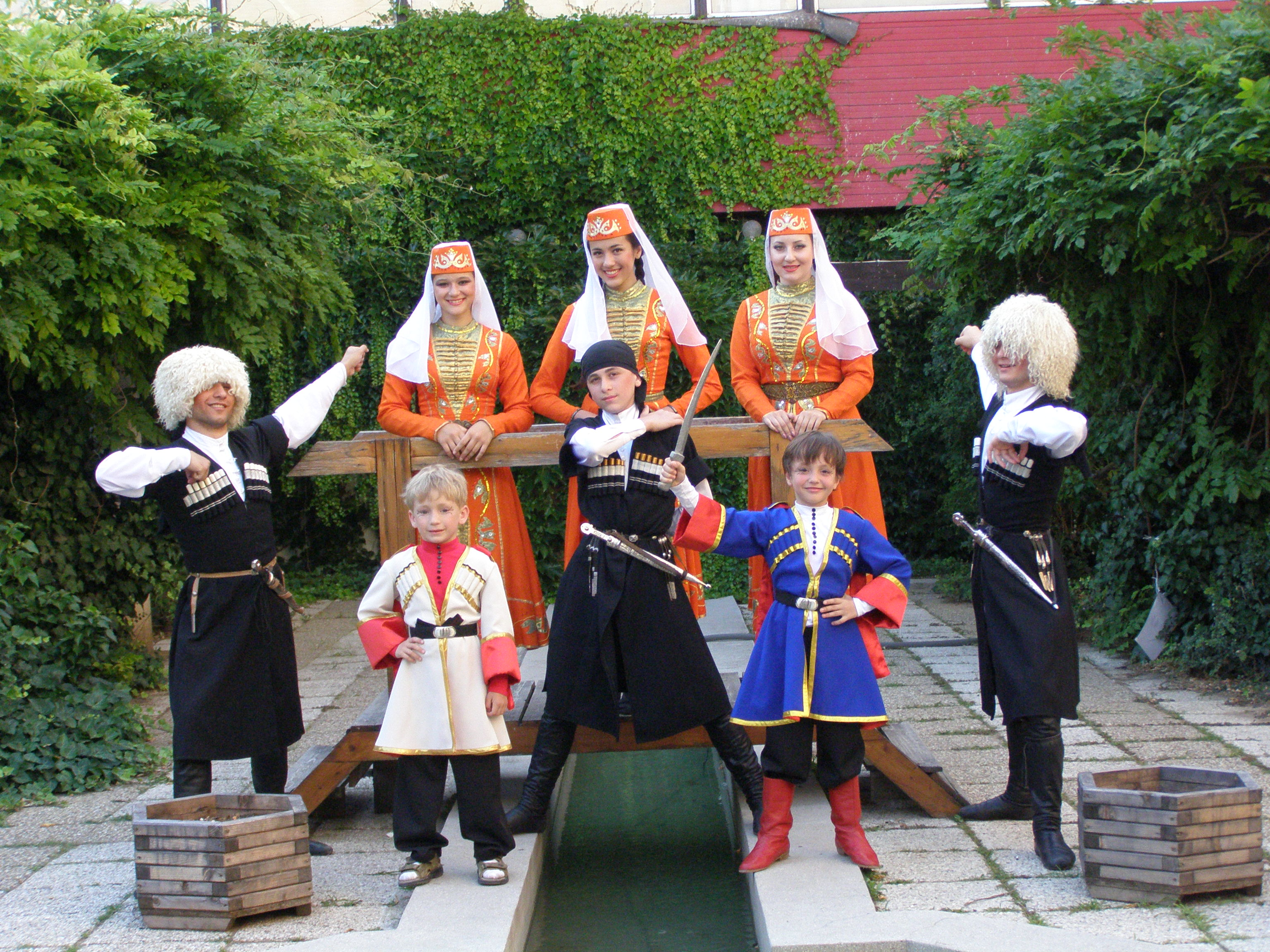
Circassian youth in traditional dress in Israel

== Demography ==
Israeli Circassians have adopted the practice of smaller families, with an average of two children per family, compared to the national rate of 3.73 children per family.

They speak both Adyghe and Hebrew, and many also speak Arabic and English, while cultivating their unique heritage and culture.

=== Circassian identity ===
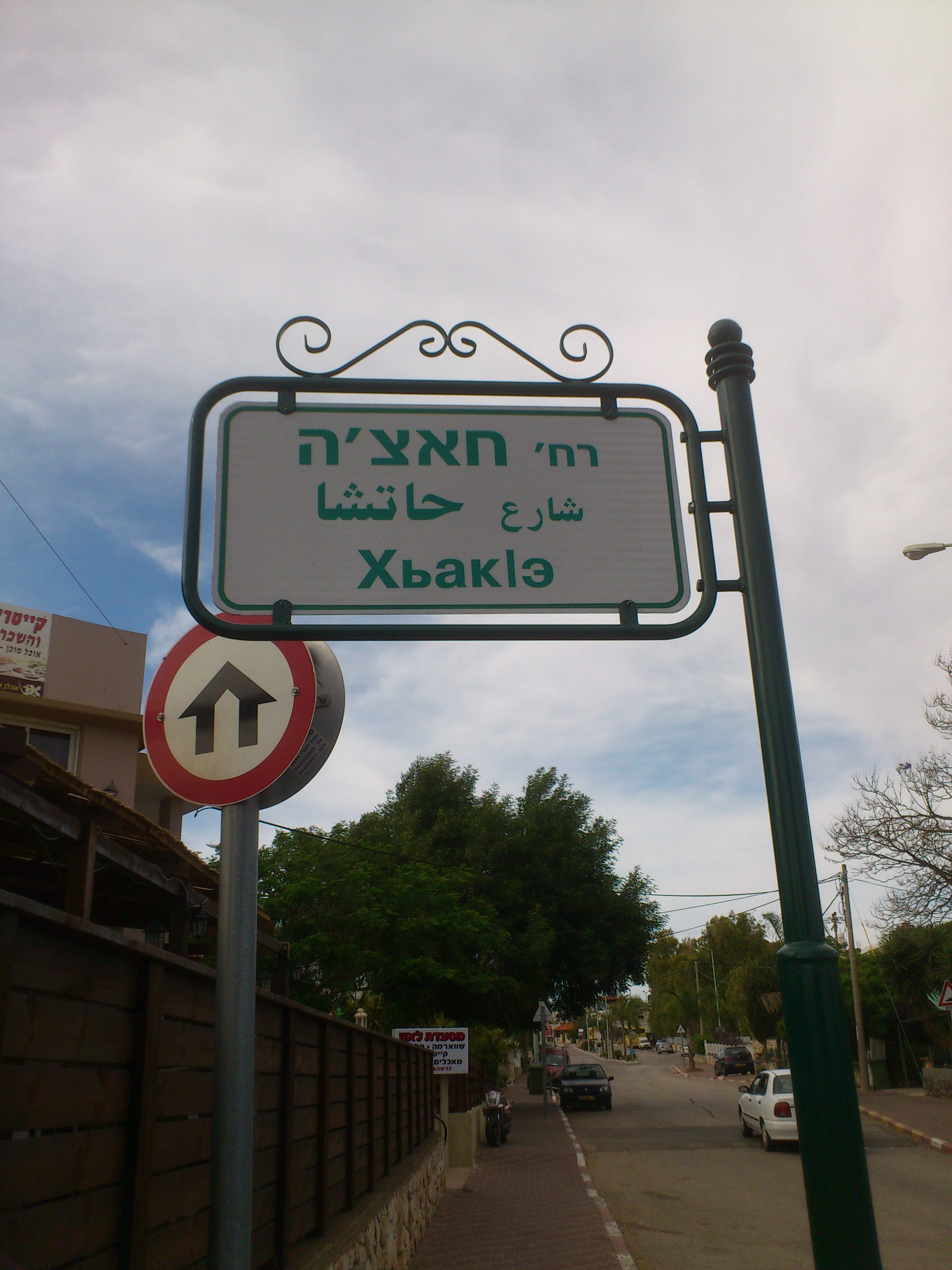
Circassian-language street sign in Israel

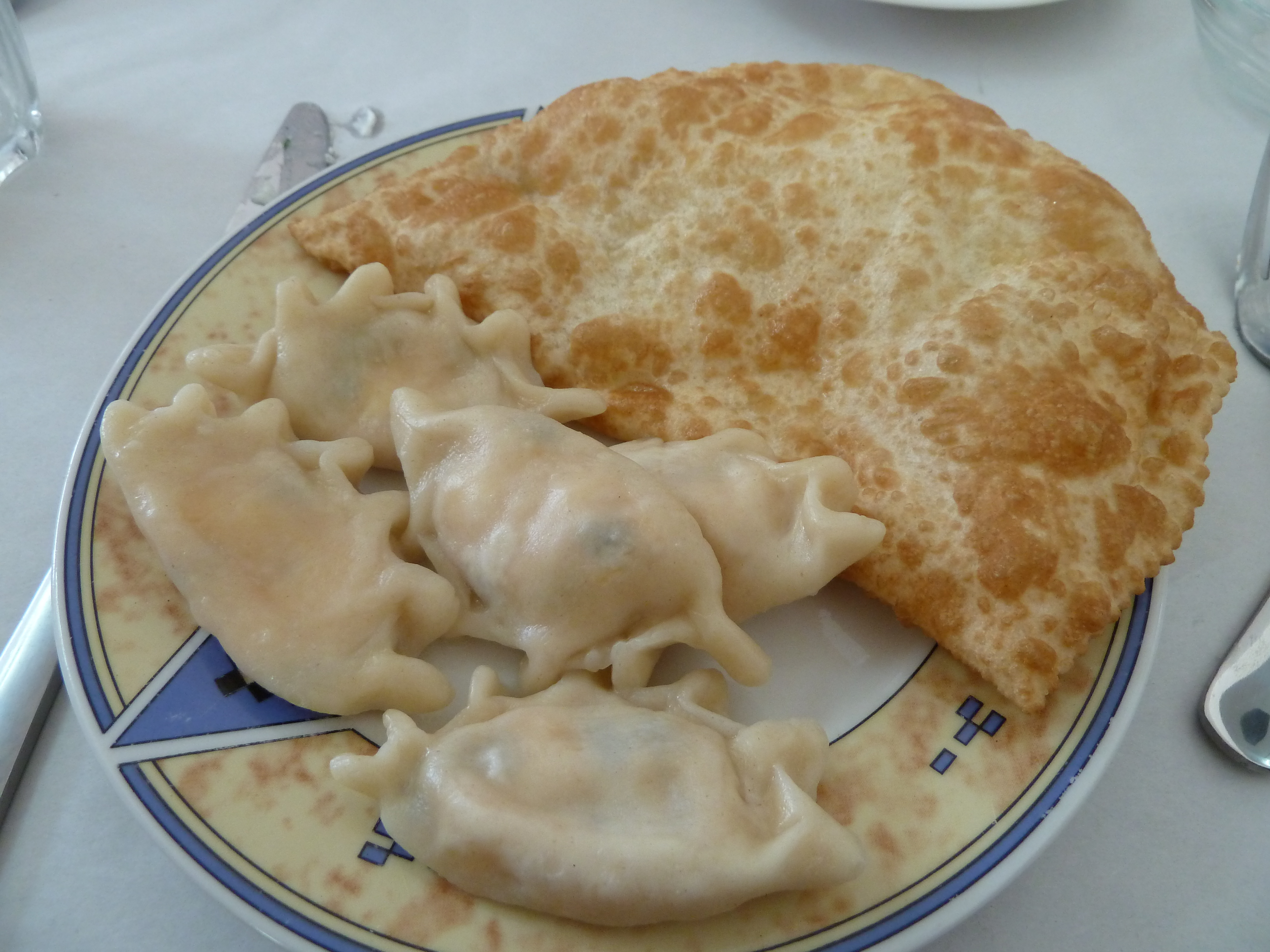
Traditional Circassian dishes (Haliva and Mataz)

Although Circassians are loyal to Israel, serve in the IDF, and have prospered as part of Israel, while preserving their language and culture, for many Israeli Circassians, their primary loyalty remains toward their scattered nation with, for some, a desire to "gather all the Circassians in the same place, whether it's autonomy, a republic within Russia, or a proper state". Influenced by the global movement of Circassian nationalism, some Israeli Circassians have returned to Russian-ruled Circassia despite the current political situation in the North Caucasus. Some Circassians who emigrated to Circassia have returned after becoming disillusioned with the low standard of living in the Circassian homeland, though some have stayed.

=== Socioeconomic position ===
In 2012, it was reported that 80% of the younger generation of Circassians in Israel had a post-secondary degree. Overall, in Israel, the percentage of adult citizens with a post-secondary degree is 49%.

In 2007, Circassian and Druze authorities in Israel launched a joint market initiative to invest in the growing tourism industry for bed-and-breakfast stays in Circassian and Druze villages, giving outsiders a chance to experience their cultures.

Circassians are regarded as being both "politically and ideologically" closer to Israeli society, although lately, "at the margins", there has been a renewed emphasis on their Islamic identity, which is thought to be due to Islamophobia coming from some sectors of Israeli society. According to Eleonore Merza: "while the Israeli Circassians are treated quite differently from the Palestinians, they are still ... often victims of discrimination". Shlomo Hasson writes that on the one hand, there are elements of equality, while on the other hand, there is exclusion, inequality, and prolonged discrimination". On the one hand, Circassians in Israel exercise their civil rights. "They are entitled to vote and be elected to the representative bodies of the state." However, on the other hand, he says, "there is inequality between Jews and the minorities. This inequality is expressed in discrimination in the allocation of resources for education, for local government, in unemployment and getting jobs, and especially in the civil service". In 2009, Circassian and Druze activists called on the government to cancel controversial land appropriations and to increase funding to the Circassian community. According to these activists, "Circassians receive less than Arab or Haredi-religious communities, despite "sixty years of loyalty". In response to the protests, Prime Minister Benjamin Netanyahu asked the Circassian and Druze communities for "patience", citing the 2008 financial crisis. In 2011, in response to the concerns that had been raised by the activists from the Circassian and Druze communities, the Israeli Knesset approved an allocation of NIS 680 million to aid the development of education, employment, housing, and tourism, as well as assistance for the needs of discharged Druze and Circassian soldiers, the bill having passed with the support of Likud, Shas, and Yisrael Beiteinu.

=== Geographic dispersion ===
The Circassian community of Israel is concentrated almost entirely in the villages of Kfar Kama (population c. 3,000) and Rehaniya (population c. 1,000). In contrast to Circassian communities in other Middle Eastern countries, which have lost much of their traditions, Israeli Circassians have carefully preserved their culture. More than 90% of Circassians return to their villages after completing their military service and studies. Despite the difficulty of finding marriage partners within a community of 4,000, Israeli Circassians mostly shun intermarriage. Although some Arabs moved to Kfar Kama, they quickly integrated into local society, and left no lasting cultural impression. Intermarriage is widely regarded as a taboo there. Rehaniya absorbed larger numbers of internally displaced Arab refugees during the 1948 war, and as a result, intermarriage with non-Circassians, while still avoided for the most part, became more acceptable there.

Most of the Circassians in Kfar Kama are Shapsugs, while those in Rehaniya are mostly Abzakhs.

== Circassian families in Israel ==
- Abrag (Adyghe: Абрэгь)
- Ashmuz or Achmuzh or Achmiz (Adyghe: Ачъумыжъ)
- Bat (Adyghe: Бат)
- Batwash (Adyghe: БэтIыуашъ)
- Bghana (Adyghe: Бгъанэ)
- Blanghaps (Adyghe: БлэнгъэпсI)
- Choshha or Shoshha (Adyghe: Чъушъхьэ)
- Gorkozh (Adyghe: ГъоркIожъ)
- Hadish (Adyghe: Хьэдищ)
- Hako or Hakho (Adyghe: Хьэхъу)
- Hazal (Adyghe: Хъэзэл)
- Kobla (Adyghe: Коблэ)
- Lauz (Adyghe: ЛъыIужъ)
- Libai or Labai (Adyghe: ЛIыпый)
- Nago (Adyghe: Наго)
- Napso (Adyghe: Нэпсэу)
- Nash (Adyghe: Наш)
- Natkho or Natcho (Adyghe: Натхъо)
- Qalyqu (Adyghe: Къалыкъу)
- Qatizh (Adyghe: Къэтыжъ)
- Sagas or Shagash (Adyghe: Шъэгьашъ)
- Shamsi (Adyghe: Чъуэмшъо)
- Shogan (Adyghe: Шэугьэн)
- Shaga (Adyghe: Шъуагьэ)
- Thawcho (Adyghe: Тхьэухъо)
- Zazi (Adyghe: Зази)

== Notable people ==
- Bibras Natcho (born 1988), Israeli-Circassian footballer, who has played as a midfielder for Serbian Partizan since 19 August 2019, and served as the captain of the Israel national team until he retired from international football on 25 March 2023.
- Izhak Nash (born 1989), Israeli-Circassian footballer who plays in the Israeli Premier League
- Nili Natkho (1982–2004), Israeli-Circassian basketball player who played for Maccabi Ra'anana and Elitzur Ramla
- Yanal Ashmouz (born 1996) - Israeli-Circassian UFC fighter. The fourth Israeli fighter in the organization's history.

== See also ==
- Circassian diaspora
