= Shapsugs =

Circassian tribe

Shapsug
Шапсыгъ
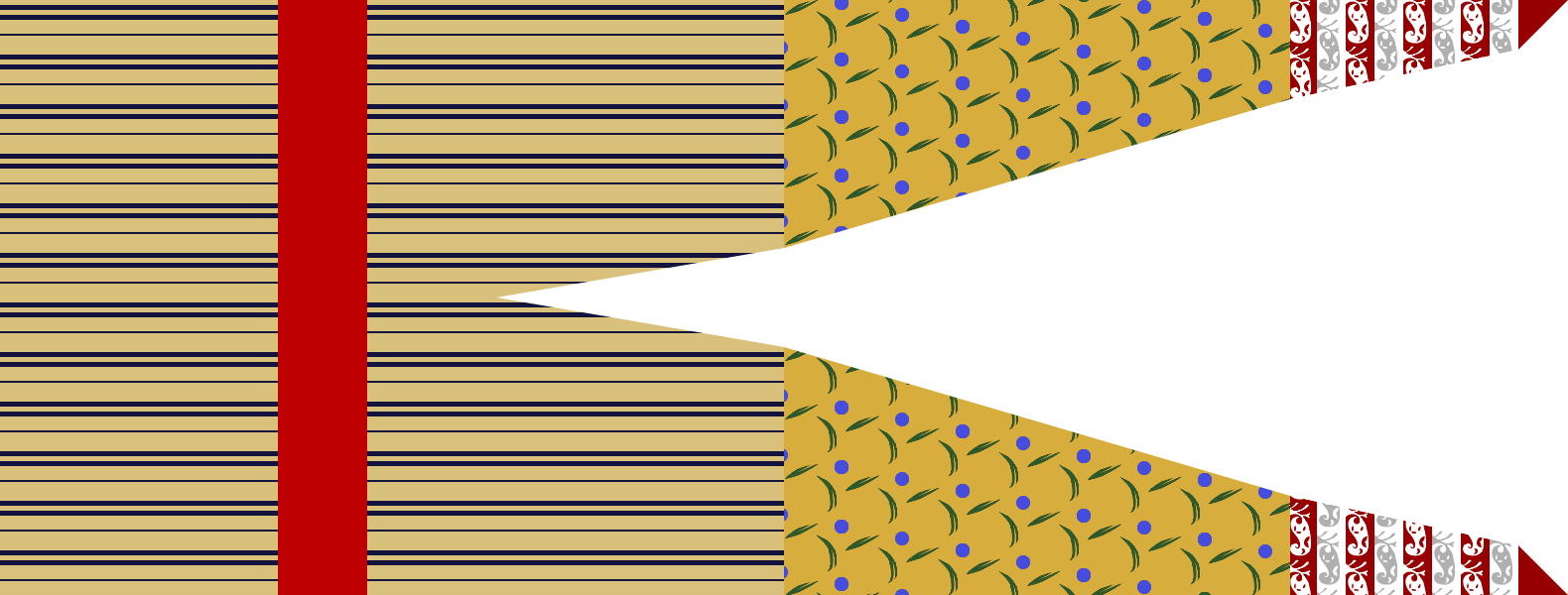

Total population
- c. 807,882

Regions with significant populations
- Turkey: 800,000 - 1,000,000 (approximation)
- Israel: 4,000
- Russia: Krasnodar Krai: 3,839 (2010 census): 1,914 (2021 census) 3,882 (2010 census)

Languages
- Circassian language (West Adyghe dialect) (Shapsug sub-dialect, Hakuchi sub-dialect), Russian, Turkish, Hebrew and Arabic

Religion
- Predominantly: Sunni Islam

Related ethnic groups
- Other Circassian tribes

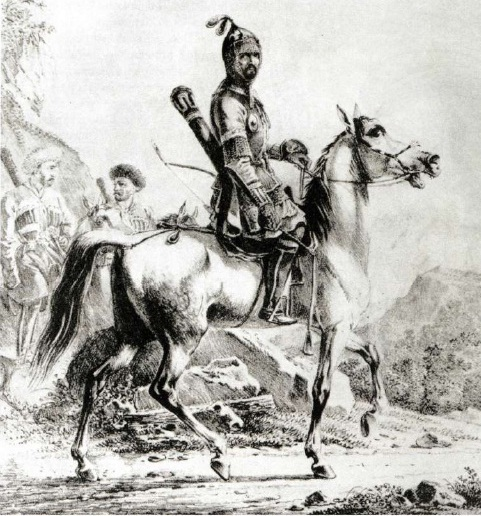
Adyghe (Circassian) knight

The Shapsug (Adyghe: шапсыгъ [ʃaːpsəʁ], Russian: шапсуги, Turkish: Şapsığlar, Arabic: الشابسوغ, Hebrew: שפסוגים) (also known as the Shapsugh or Shapsogh) are one of the twelve major Circassian tribes. Historically, the Shapsug tribe comprised one of the largest groups of the Black Sea Adyghe (Причерноморские адыги). They inhabited the region between the Dzhubga (in Adyghe: Жьыбгъэ means "Winds" or "The Valley of Winds") River and the Shakhe Rivers (the so-called Maly Shapsug, or Little Shapsug) and high-altitude mountainous areas of the northern slopes of the Caucasus range along the Antkhir, Abin, Afips, Bakan, Ships, and other rivers (Bolshoy Shapsug, or Greater Shapsug). In Russia, the remaining Shapsug population mainly live in the Tuapsinsky District (Tuapse) of Krasnodar Krai, Lazarevsky City District of Sochi, and in the Republic of Adygea (mainly in District of Takhtamukaysky and District of Teuchezksky), which were a small part of historical Circassia.

However, today the major Shapsug communities are found in Turkey, Israel (Kfar Kama), Jordan (Amman, Na'our, Marj Al-Hamam, Wadi Al-Seer), Lebanon (Tripoli, Berkayel-Akkar), Iraq, Syria, Western Europe and the United States of America. The first Circassians to settle in Amman were from the Shapsug tribe, and as a result the Shapsug's neighbourhood is considered the oldest neighbourhood in the Capital Amman and was the down town of it; however, other Circassians from the Kabardian, Abadzekh, and Bzhedug tribes also settled in Amman afterwards. Today, the Shapsug are the third-most numerous Circassian tribe in the world, after the most numerous Kabardian and second-most numerous Abzakh tribes. The Shapsug are the most numerous Circassian tribe in Israel, third-most numerous in Turkey where the majority of them live, and the fifth-most numerous one in Russia. In Jordan, after the Abzakh, the Shapsug and Kabardian tribes are the most numerous Adyghe tribes.

The Shapsug speak a sub-dialect of the Adyghe language. According to some indirect data, there were over four thousand Shapsug in Russia in 1926, but the Shapsug people were not enumerated as a separate group in Russian Censuses until 2002, when the population was recorded at 3,231. The Shapsug who live in the Adyghe Republic were enumerated as an Adyghe in general instead of Shapsug in particular, as they are an Adyghe (Circassian) tribe, rather than a separate ethnic group.

In District of Takhtamukaysky a reservoir which was built in 1952 was named after the Shapsug tribe (Russian: Шапсугское водохранилище) since the area was inhabited by this tribe for thousands of years and was considered to be part of historical Shapsugia, a region in historical Circassia.

== History ==
The Shapsugs were a very large tribe that occupied extensive territories of the Black Sea coast and the Kuban River. Different sources note that, prior to the Russo-Caucasian War, the number of Shapsug people was between 150,000 and 300,000 people. The Shapsug had divisions of Big and Small Shapsug land, the latter being very close to the Natukhai tribe's land. The Shapsug took an active role in the Caucasian war. They had a reputation of invincibility and were one of the last to lay down their weapons under the pressure of tsarist troops in 1864. Some Shapsug troops fought until the 1880s. After the end of the war the overwhelming majority of the Shapsug were forcefully evicted to Turkey and elsewhere in the Middle East. No more than 6,000 Shapsug people remained on their native land. Presently, these Shapshug live in the territory of Krasnodarsky Krai and make up about 20 villages. From 1924 to 1945, there was a Shapsug national district, which was abolished during the time of repressions.

Historically the Shapsug controlled the ports of Dzhubga (Adyghe: Жьыбгъэ) and Tuapse to the mountain gorges, and consisted of 5 aristocratic families and 81 (Adyghe: Фэкъул1) free clans. They were classified as one of the three democratic Adyghe tribes. The Shapsug were known to have supported the other Adyghe tribes in their struggle against the Crimean Khanate. During the Caucasian War, they were one of the most stubborn enemies of Imperial Russia, joining Shamil's alliance (which would last until 1859). In late 1860, a council was assembled by the representatives of three Adyghe tribes (Shapsug, Ubykh, and Natukhai). The council considered (Adyghe: Шъачэ) Sochi to be the last capital of the Circassian resistance. In 1864, a major part of the Shapsug and other Adyghe tribes moved to the Ottoman Empire due to the Russian army occupation of Circassia, as a result of the tsars' regular policy to cleanse the Circassian coast of Circassian people (mainly physically; later by expelling the remaining population to the Ottoman Empire. Some 3,000 Shapsug remained on the Circassian coast.

The Shapsug, as an Adyghe tribe, have always appreciated and honored their "immortals" (heroes and fighters) who sacrificed their lives to keep Circassia independent in the battles and war with the Russian Empire during the Circassian resistance; by elegies such as the Elegy of the Shapsugs (Adyghe: Шапсыгъэ л1ыхъужъхэм ягъыбз)

== Shapsugsky national district ==
On 6 September 1924, the Bolsheviks established the Shapsug national raion (Adyghe: Шапсыгъэ Националнэ Район Šapsyġe Nacionalne Rajon, Russian: Шапсугский национальный район Šapsugskij nacional′nyj rajon) as a part of the Black Sea Okrug. The district contained around 3,400 Shapsug people, and the center of the district was the coastal city of Tuapse. In the beginning of 1925, it was divided into 4 village councils: Karpovsky, Kichmai, Krasno-Aleksandrovsky, and Pseushkho. After the end of the Second World War in 1945, the Shapsug national raion was renamed Lazarevsky district.

In 1990, the first congress of the Shapsug tribe took place, where they would adopt a declaration on the reinstatement of the Shapsug national raion. On 12 June 1992, the Presidium of the Supreme Soviet of the Russian Federation passed a resolution on the establishment of the Shapsug national raion.

== Culture ==
The traditional Shapsug culture had much in common with other Circassian tribes. The Shapsug were engaged in agriculture, cattle and horse breeding, horticulture, viticulture, and beekeeping. In pre-Islamic and pre-Christian times, the Shapsug worshiped the Circassian gods—Shible (god of thunder and lightning), Sozeresh (Adyghe: Созереш) (god of fertility), Yemish or Yemij (god of war), Akhin and Khakustash (protectors of cattle breeding), Tlepsh (god of blacksmithing), Keshkogwasha (Adyghe: Хышхогуащэ) (god of the Black Sea), etc. The Shapsug used to perform the Hantse Guashe (Adyghe: Хьэнцэ гуащэ) ceremony of rain calling during droughts by carrying a dressed doll through the aul and then drowning it in the river, and never getting it out before rain had arrived.

Since the early 19th century, the Shapsug are primarily Sunni Muslims (Hanafi).

== Language ==
The Shapsug (Adyghe: Шапсыгъэбзэ) is one of the mutually intelligible sub-dialects of the Adyghe language's West Adyghe dialect. There were two major varieties of Shapsug before the exile of the Circassians. Since the Shapsug scattered around the world, each Shapsug community developed a different form of speech.

== Families ==
Circassian	Transcription	Circassian	Transcription	Circassian	Transcription	Circassian	Transcription	Circassian	Transcription	Circassian	Transcription
Натхъомэ ялIакъохэр	Natkhoma Yalhakhokhar	НэтIахъомэ ялIакъохэр	Netakhoma Yalhakhokhar	Коблы ялIакъохэр	Kobl Yalhakhokhar	Шъхьаптэхэ ялIакъохэр	Shhaptakha Yalhakhokhar	Гъуагъо-Шъэотэхмэ ялIакъохэр	Ghorha-shawatkhma Yalhakhokhar	Гуаемэ ялIакъохэр	Guayama Yalhakhokhar
Акьэжъ	Achazh	Абир (Абыр)	Abir	Ачумыжъ	Achmuzh	Абрэгь	Abreg	БжьашIо	Bzhasho	БжыхьалI	Bzhihalh
Ачокъу	Achoqw	Алащэ	Alasha	Бастэ	Basta	Егъум	Yagum	Борэкъо	Boraqo	Гунай	Gunai
Багьэ	Baga	Бэус	Baws	Батэ	Bata	Нэгъучу	Naghuchu	Гусэр	Gusar	Дачэ	Dacha
Бзыщ	Bzish	Гъурыжъ	Ghurezh	Бгъанэ	Bghana	ОгъулI	Waghulh	Джадэ	Jada	ЕкIуашъ	Yaquash
Быркьэ	Berqa	Дыжьы	Dizh	Джарым	Jarem	Пцашэ	Ptsasha	Иныхъу	Yinikho	КIэсэбэжъ	Chasabazh
БэгъэгушIу	Baghagush’u	Дэджэраджэ	Dajaraja	Дэбэхьу	Dabahu	Тыркуао	Tirquawa	Къанщэжь	Qanshazh	Къэрэджан	Qarajam
Джарым	Jarem	Ешъуталъэ	Yashutalha	Дэгуф	Daguf	Хъуд	Khud	Къуаджэ	Quaja	ЛIыхъужъ	Lhekhuzh
Емызагъ	Yamezagh	КIакIыхъу	Chachekhu	ЛIыф	Lhif	ХыдзэлI	Khidzalh	ЛIыхъужъыкъу	Lhekhuzhequ	Лъэцэрыкъу	Lhatsariqu
Ергъужъ	Yarghuzh	МэзакIу	Mazaku	ЛIыхъужъ	Lhekhuzh	Хьагъур	Zhaghur	Лъэпшъыкъу	Lhapshiqu	Мэджаджэкъу	Majajaqu
КIуф	K’uf	Пэхъу	Pakhu	Наго	Nago	Хьахъу	Hakhu	Мышъэ	Misha	Мэмэт	Mamat
Кьэхъу	Qakhw	Тхыжъ	Tkhizh	Нащэ	Nasha	Хьэлъакъу	Halhaqu	Мэт	Met	Мэт	Met
ЛIыкьас	L’hikas	Хьазыкъу	Haziqu	Нэгъужъ	Naghuzh	Шъау	Shaw	ПсэкIэкI	Psachach	Нэукъ	Nawq
Мэлыщ	Malish	Хьахъуратэ	Hakhurata	Нэпсэу	Napso	Шъхьэлахъо	Shhalakho	Тым	Tim	ПщыукI	Pshiwch
Мэфэуд	Mafawud	Хьурым	Hurim	Псэукъо	Psoqo			Ушъый	Wshiy	Сабын (Сабыныкъу)	Sabeniqu)
Натхъо	Natkho	ШIужъэкъу	Shuzhaqu	Пэкожъ	Pakozh			Хъун	Khun	ТхьалI	Thalh
НэмылIэкъу	Namilhaqu	Шъуагьэ	Shuaga	РатIэкъу	Rataqu			Хьатыщ	Hatish	Хьагъун	Haghun
Отэхь	Watah	Шъхьабэ	Shhaba	ТIэшъу	Tashu			Чушъхьэ	Choshha	ХьамтIэхъу	Hamtakhu
Сэхъут	Sakhut	ШъхьакIумыдэ	Shhakumida	Тамухъ	Tamukh			ШIуцIэ	Shutsa		
Тхьэкъуахъо	Thaqwakho			Тхьакъуахъо	Thaquakho			Шъэгьашъ	Shagash		
Тыкъо	Tiqo			Тыу	Tiw			Шъэотэхьу	Shawatahu		
Тыу	Tiw			Хъупщ	Khupsh			Шыу	Shiw		
Хьапый	Hapiy			ХъутIыжъ	Khutezh			ШэкIолI	Shakolh		
Хьатх	Hatkh			ХьамтIыжъ (ХьамтIэ)	Hamtizh						
Хьатыу	Hatuw			Хьантыу	Hantuw						
Шыумыжъ	Shiwmizh			Хьаратэ	Harata						
ШэхэлI	Shakhal’			Хьэтаужъ	Hatawzh						
чемсо	Chemso			ШъэIужъу	Shauzhu						
				Шъэумэн	Shawman						
				ШэрэлI	Sharalh						
				Шэугьэн	Shogan						

=== Shapsug families in Jordan ===
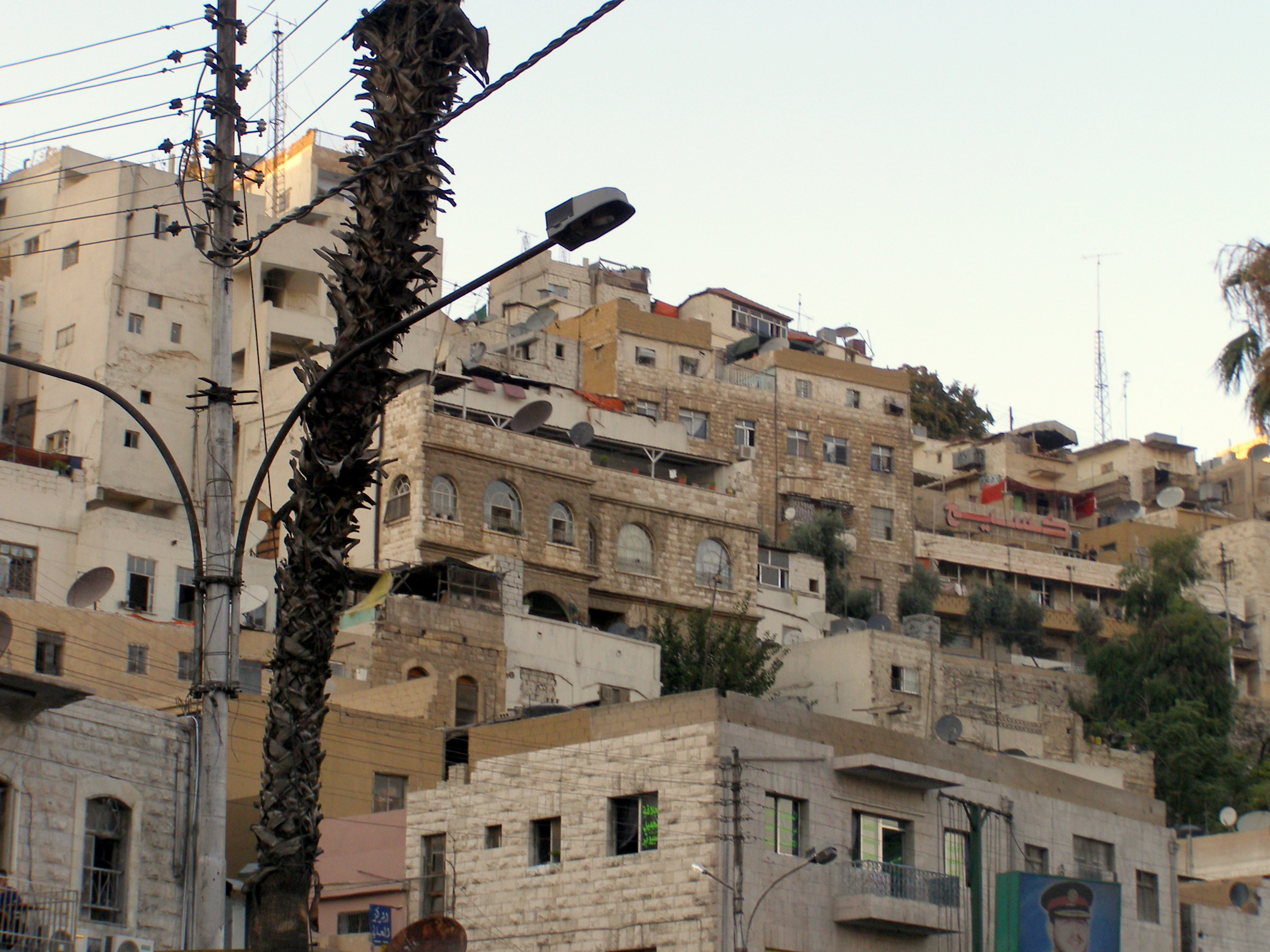
The Shapsug neighbourhood in Amman, Jordan

- Majajaqu (Adyghe: Мэджаджэкъу)
- Kosho (Adyghe: Кушъу / Кушу)
- Pshedatok (Adyghe: Пшыдатукъ)
- Shhalakhwa (Adyghe: Шхьэлахъо)
- Psekenop (Adyghe: Псыкынуп)
- Jan (Adyghe: Джан)
- T’harkakhwa (Adyghe: Тхьэркъахъуэ)
- Kwiej (Adyghe: Къуеж)
- Hadagha (Adyghe: Хьэдагъэ)
- Meesha (Adyghe: Мишэ)
- Hatough (Adyghe: Хьэтогъ)
- Naghoj (Adyghe: Нэгъуж)
- Tamokh (Adyghe: Тамохъ)
- Khorma (Adyghe: Хъурмэ)
- Bghana (Adyghe: Бгъанэ)
- Naghouj (Adyghe: нэгъуцу)
- Hakuch (Adyghe: Хьэху)

which changed in Jordan to Hakouz (Adyghe: Хэкужъ after their 15th great-grandfather Хэкужъ born in 1337 in Tuapse, and this family considered the biggest Shapsug family in Jordan.

- Natkho (Shukri) (Adyghe: Натхъо)
- Shawash (Adyghe: ШъэошIу)
- Shoupash (Adyghe: Шупащ)

=== Shapsug families in Kfar Kama, Israel ===
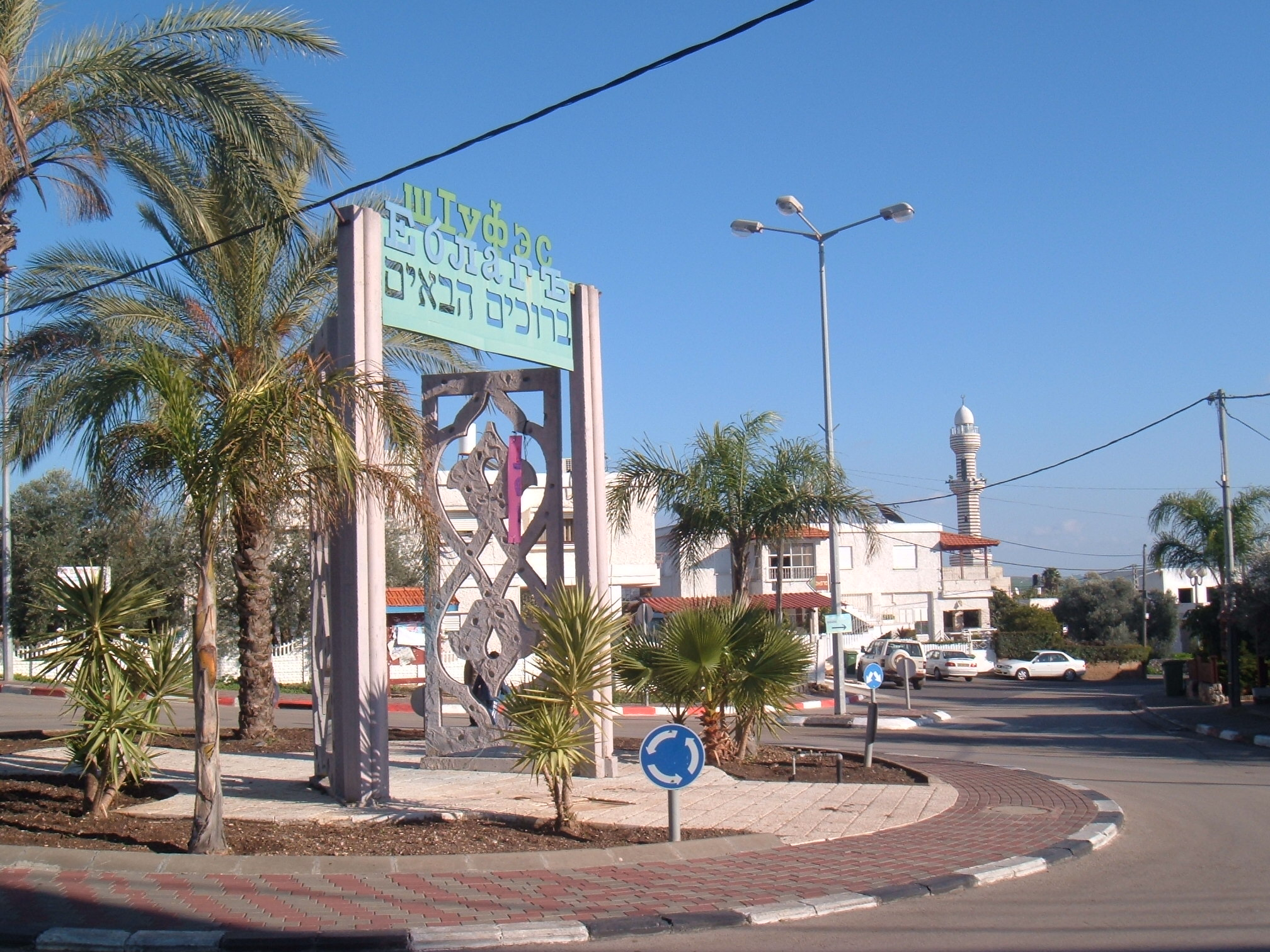
The Shapsug village Kfar Kama, Israel

- Abrag (Adyghe: Абрэгь)
- Ashmuz/Achmuzh (Adyghe: Ацумыжъ)
- Bghana (Adyghe: Бгъанэ)
- Bat (Adyghe: Бат)
- Blanghaps (Adyghe: БлэныгъэпсI)
- Batwash (Adyghe: ПIэтIуащ)
- Jandar (Adyghe: Джэндар)
- Gorkozh (Adyghe: ГъоркIожъ) (Originally Adyghe: Оркъыжъ)
- Zazi (Adyghe: Зази)
- Kobla (Adyghe: Коблэ)
- Qal (Adyghe: Къал)
- Qatizh (Adyghe: Къэтӏыжъ)
- Lauz (Adyghe: ЛIыIужъу)
- Libai/Labai (Adyghe: ЛIыпый)
- Nago (Adyghe: Наго)
- Natkho (Adyghe: Натхъо)
- Nash (Adyghe: Наш)
- Napso (Adyghe: Нэпсэу)
- Thawcho (Adyghe: Тхьэухъо)
- Hazal (Adyghe: ХъэзэлI)
- Hutazh (Adyghe: Хъутӏэжъ)
- Hadish (Adyghe: Хьэдищ)
- Hako/Hakho (Adyghe: Хьэхъу)
- Shamsi (Adyghe: Чэмышъо)
- Choshha/Shoshha (Adyghe: Цушъхьэ)
- Shogan (Adyghe: Шэугьэн)
- Shaga (Adyghe: Шъуагьэ)
- Sagas/Shagash (Adyghe: Шъэгьашъ)
- Shhalakhwa (Adyghe: Шхьэлахъо).

== Notable people ==
- Tirimüjgan Kadın – Mother of Sultan Abdul Hamid II of the Ottoman Empire
- Karzeg Sait Bey (1887–1920)
- Hazret Sovmen
- Tuguzhuko Kyzbech
- Suna Öz – Mother of Dr Oz
- Bibras Natcho
- Nili Natkho
- Hamit Kaplan
- Adil Candemir

== See also ==
- Other Circassian tribes
- Shapsug Adyghe sub-dialect
- Hakuchi Adyghe sub-dialect
- Murayj al-Durr
