= Kfar Kama =

Circassian town in Israel

Kfar Kama Hebrew: כְּפַר כַּמָא Arabic: كفر كما Adyghe: Кфар Кама
- Local council (from 1950)

Hebrew transcription(s)
  - ISO 259: Kfar Kamaˀ
  - Also spelled: Кфар Кама (Adyghe) (official)
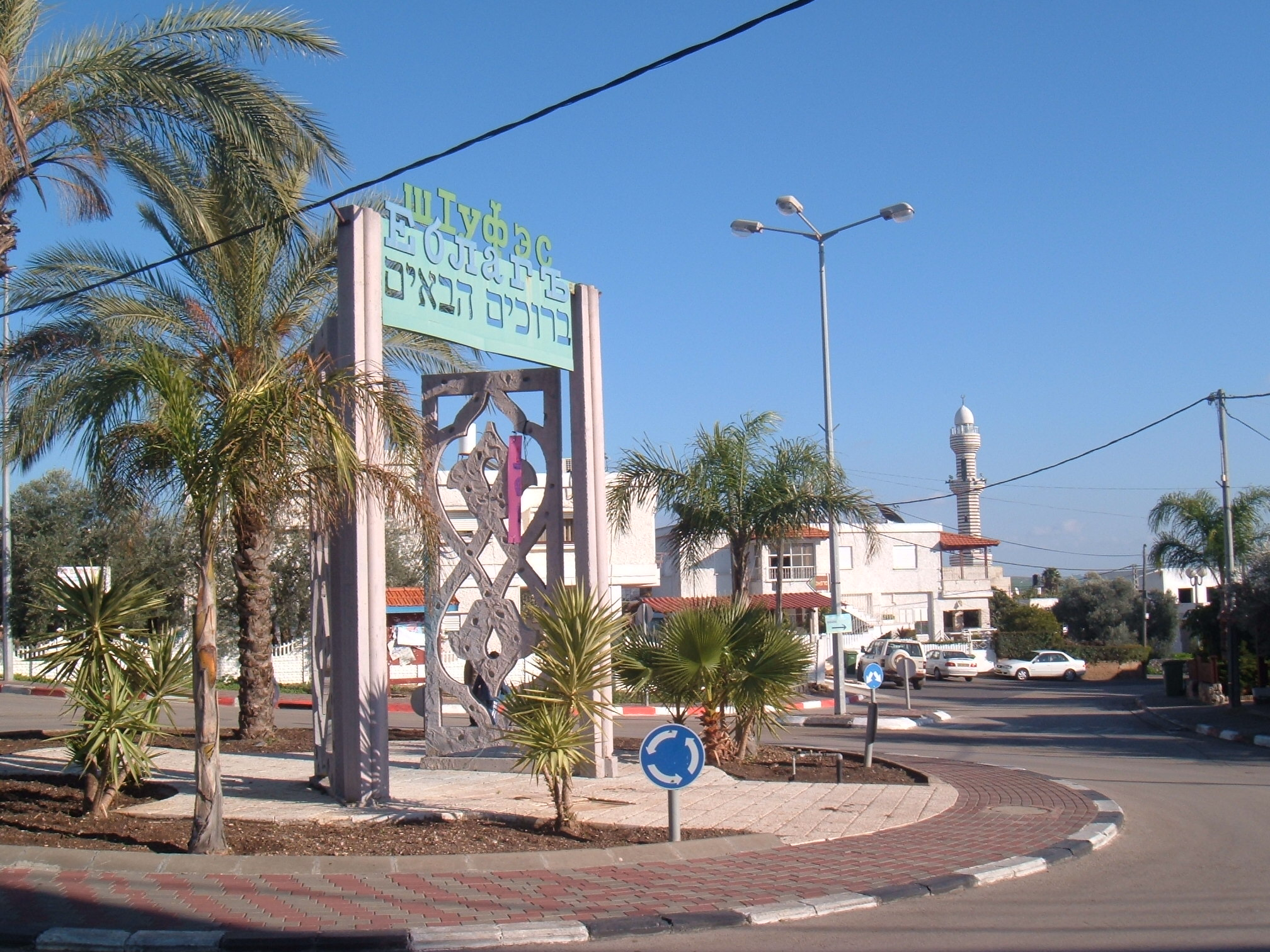

- Flag

- Location within Northeast Israel Location within Israel
- Coordinates: 32°43′19″N 35°26′27″E
- Grid position: 191/236 PAL
- Country: Israel
- District: Northern
- Subdistrict: Kinneret
- Natural Region: Eastern Lower Galilee
- Founded: 1878

Government
  - Mayor: Zachariah Nabaso

Area
  - Total: 8,854 dunams (8.854 km^{2}; 3.419 sq mi)

Population (2024)
  - Total: 3,545
  - Density: 400.4/km^{2} (1,037/sq mi)
- Name meaning: The village of truffles

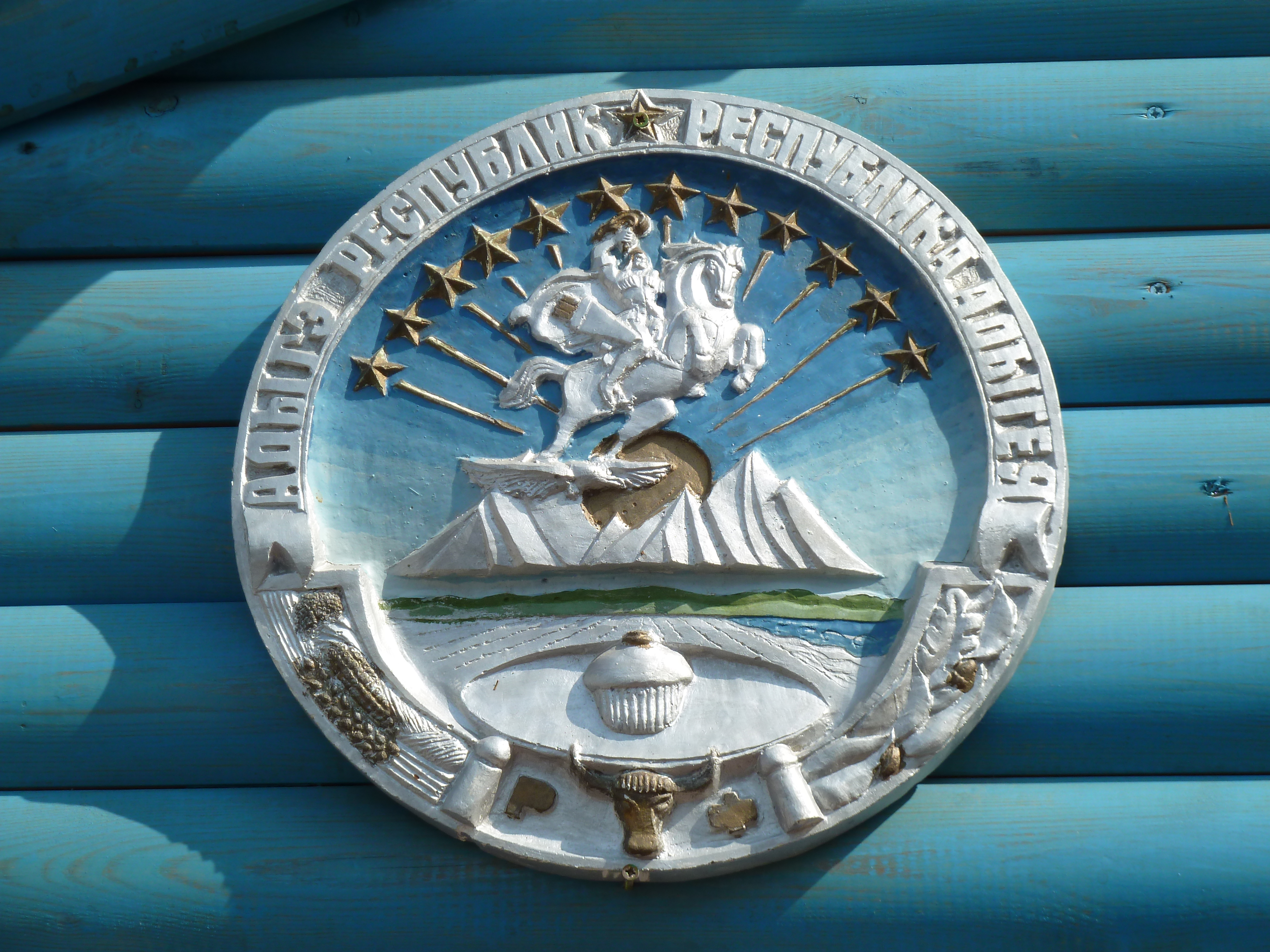
Coat of Arms of Adygea in the Circassian Heritage Center of Kfar Kama

Kfar Kama (Hebrew: כְּפַר כַּמָא, Arabic: كفر كما, Adyghe: Кфар Кама) is a Circassian town located in the Lower Galilee of Israel's northern district, located along road 767, that leads from Kfar Tavor to the Kinneret. It is one of the only two Circassian towns in Israel, the other being Rehaniya. The residents of the town are descended from Shapsug tribe exiles from Circassia. In 2008, the town had a population of 2,900.

== Name ==
The town's name has an uncertain origin, and several possible interpretations exist. It could potentially signify a heap of wheat, derive from "qama" meaning grain, or even have roots in Arabic, such as "kama," signifying a hilltop or a hilltop village, or "qama", denoting a fertile pasture for sheep and cattle.

== History ==
=== Antiquity ===
The modern village of Kfar Kama is built on an ancient site. Ruins and parts of five limestone columns were found in addition to a circular basalt olive-press and cisterns. In 2020, a team of archaeologists led by Nurit Feig of the Israel Antiquities Authority discovered 6th-century church remains. The excavators also revealed painted floor mosaics showing geometric shapes and blue, black, and red floral patterns. The dimensions of the main part of the church are 12 by 36 metres. Several other rooms were unearthed near the church. According to archeologist Shani Libbi, additional rooms in the area have been revealed by ground penetrating radar.

Archaeologists have proposed that Kfar Kama was the village Helenopolis that Constantine established in honor of his mother Helen. Excavations carried out in 1961 and 1963 revealed 4th century tombs. Two churches dated to the early 6th century, one dedicated to Saint Thecla, were uncovered, with multicolored mosaics of floral, animal and geometric patterns.

=== Middle Ages ===
In the Crusader period it was known as Kapharchemme or Capharkeme.

=== Ottoman Empire ===
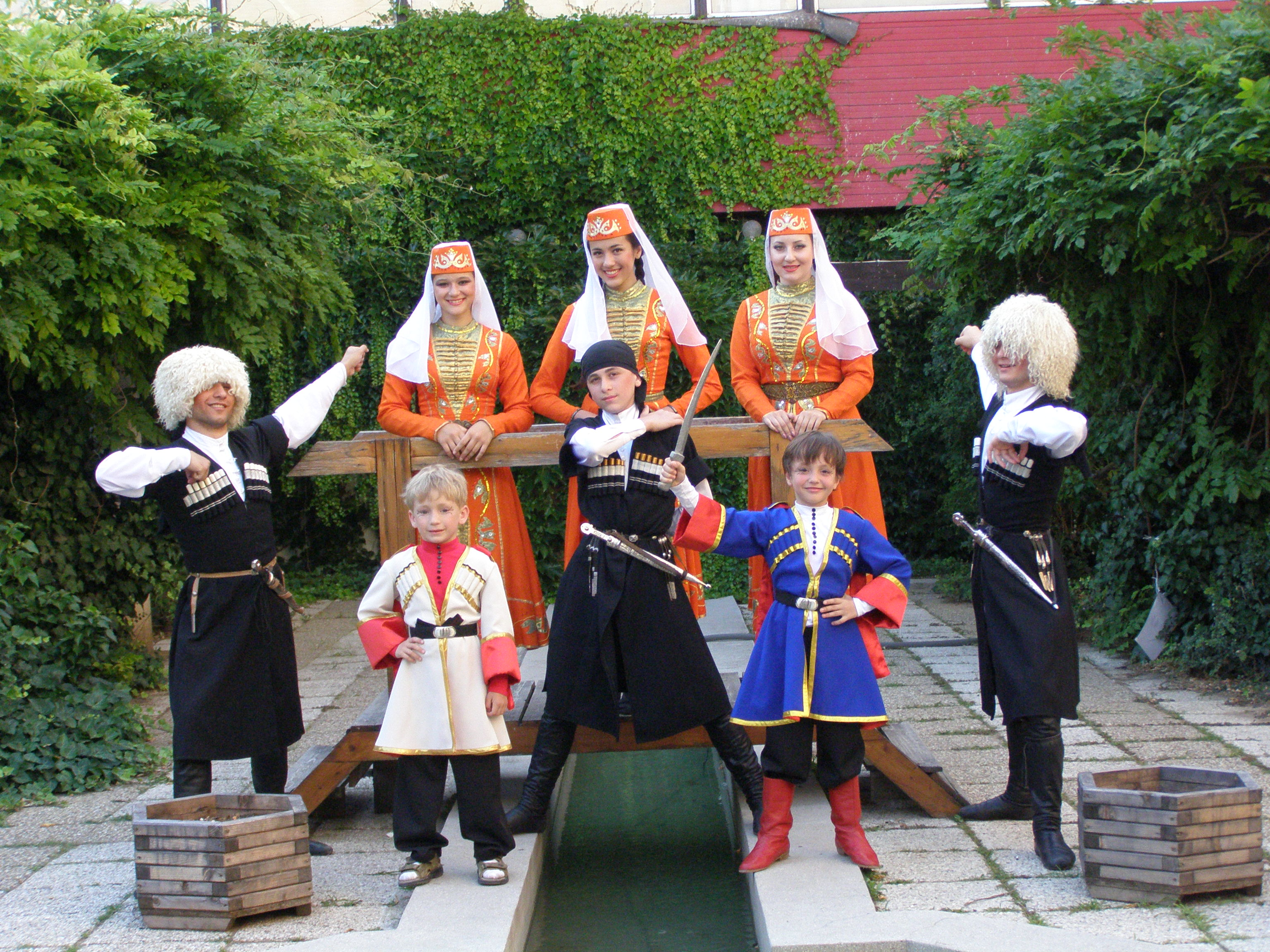
Circassians in traditional garb, Kfar Kama

In 1596, Kfar Kama appeared in Ottoman tax registers as a village in the Nahiya of Tiberias in the Liwa of Safad. It had a population of 34 Muslim households and paid a fixed tax rate of 25% on agricultural products, which included wheat, barley, summer crops, cotton, and goats or beehives; a total of 5,450 akçe.

In 1838, it was mentioned as a village in the Tiberias district.

In 1870s, the village was described as having basalt stone houses and a population of 200 Moslems living on a plain of arable soil.

In 1878, a group of 1,150 Circassian immigrants from the Adyghe tribe Shapsugs who were exiled from the Caucasus by the Russians to the Ottoman Empire due to the Russian-Circassian War settled in the village. Initially they made their living by raising animals, but later became farmers. The first school was established about 1880.

A population survey in 1887 found 1,150 inhabitants, all Circassian Muslims.

=== British Mandate ===
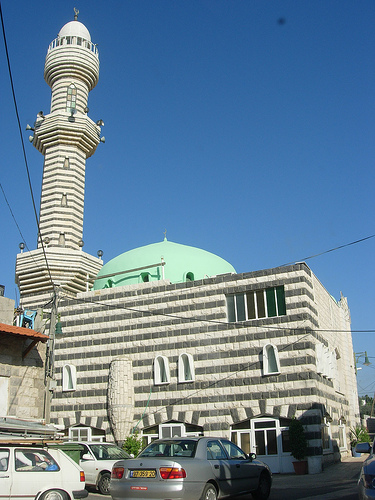
Mosque next to Circassian Heritage Center in Kfar Kama

At the time of the 1922 census of Palestine by the British Mandate authorities, Kfar Kama had a population of 670 Muslims and 7 Christians, decreasing slightly in the 1931 census to 644, one Christian and the rest Muslims, in a total of 169 houses.

In 1945 census by the Mandate, the population was 660 people (all Muslims) and the land area was 8,819 dunams. Of this, 8,293 dunams were allocated to cereal farming, while 108 dunams were built-up (urban) land.

=== Israel ===
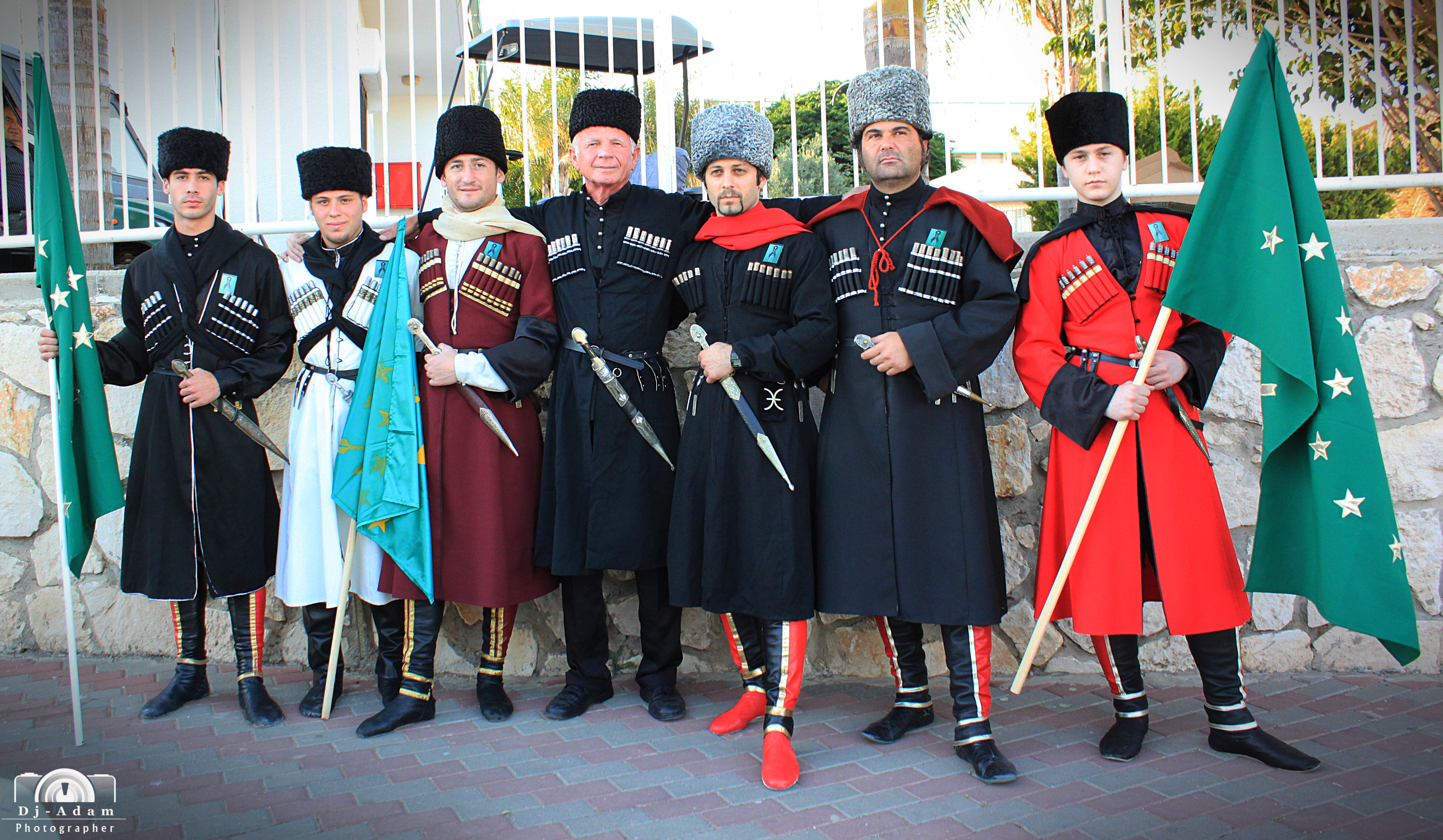
Circassians from Kfar Kama, 2011

Kfar Kama is one of two Circassian villages in Israel. The other one is Rehaniya. The Circassians are Muslims who, unlike the main Israeli Arab Muslim minority, are obligated to perform military service in the Israeli Defense Forces. The village school teaches in Circassian, Hebrew, Arabic and English.

A Center for Circassian Heritage is situated in the village.

== Demographics ==
Historical population
Year	Pop.	±%
1972	1,400	—
1983	1,700	+21.4%
1995	2,400	+41.2%
2008	2,900	+20.8%
2022	3,412	+17.7%
2024	3,545	+3.9%

In 2022, 100% of the population was Muslim.

== Notable people ==
- Izhak Nash (born 1989), a Circassian Israeli footballer currently playing for Hapoel Ironi Baqa al-Gharbiyye
- Bibras Natcho (born 1988), a Circassian Israeli footballer currently playing in Europe and the captain of the Israeli national football team
- Nili Natkho (1982–2004), a Circassian Israeli basketball player who played for Maccabi Raanana and Elitzur Ramla

=== Shapsug families ===
- Abrag (Adyghe: Абрэгь)
- Ashmuz/Achmuzh (Adyghe: Ацумыжъ)
- Bghana (Adyghe: Бгъанэ)
- Bat (Adyghe: Бат)
- Blanghaps (Adyghe: БлэныгъэпсI)
- Batwash (Adyghe: ПIэтIуащ)
- Jandar (Adyghe: Джэндар)
- Gorkozh (Adyghe: ГъоркIожъ) (Originally Adyghe: Оркъыжъ)
- Zazi (Adyghe: Зази)
- Kobla (Adyghe: Коблэ)
- Qal (Adyghe: Къал)
- Qatizh (Adyghe: Къэтӏыжъ)
- Lauz (Adyghe: ЛIыIужъу)
- Libai/Labai (Adyghe: ЛIыпый)
- Nago (Adyghe: Наго)
- Natkho (Adyghe: Натхъо)
- Nash (Adyghe: Наш)
- Napso (Adyghe: Нэпсэу)
- Thawcho (Adyghe: Тхьэухъо)
- Hazal (Adyghe: ХъэзэлI)
- Hutazh (Adyghe: Хъутӏэжъ)
- Hadish (Adyghe: Хьэдищ)
- Hako/Hakho (Adyghe: Хьэхъу)
- Shamsi (Adyghe: Чэмышъо)
- Choshha/Shoshha (Adyghe: Цушъхьэ)
- Shogan (Adyghe: Шэугьэн)
- Shaga (Adyghe: Шъуагьэ)
- Sagas/Shagash (Adyghe: Шъэгьашъ)
- Shhalakhwa (Adyghe: Шхьэлахъо).

=== Other Circassian families ===
- Abzah (Adyghe: Абзах) (Abzakh)
- Bushnaq (Adyghe: Бущнакъ) (Circassians of mixed Bosnian origin)
- Bazdug/Bzhedug (Adyghe: Бжъэдыгъу) (Bzhedug)
- Yadig (Adyghe: Едыгь) (Hatuqay)
- Hatukai (Adyghe: Хьэтыкъуай) (Hatuqay)
- Tsai (Adyghe: Цэй) (Abzakh)
- Shapsugh (Adyghe: Шапсыгъ)

=== Non-Circassian families ===
- Zoabi (Arabs)
- Masharqa (Arabs)

== See also ==
- Kfar Kama Adyghe dialect
- Circassians in Israel

== Bibliography ==
- Barron, J.B., ed. (1923). Palestine: Report and General Abstracts of the Census of 1922. Government of Palestine.
- Conder, C.R.; Kitchener, H.H. (1881). The Survey of Western Palestine: Memoirs of the Topography, Orography, Hydrography, and Archaeology. Vol. 1. London: Committee of the Palestine Exploration Fund.
- Dauphin, C. (1998). La Palestine byzantine, Peuplement et Populations. BAR International Series 726 (in French). Vol. III : Catalogue. Oxford: Archeopress. ISBN 0-86054-905-4.
- Department of Statistics (1945). Village Statistics, April, 1945. Government of Palestine.
- Hadawi, S. (1970). Village Statistics of 1945: A Classification of Land and Area ownership in Palestine. Palestine Liberation Organization Research Center. Archived from the original on 2018-12-08.
- Hütteroth, W.-D.; Abdulfattah, K. (1977). Historical Geography of Palestine, Transjordan and Southern Syria in the Late 16th Century. Erlanger Geographische Arbeiten, Sonderband 5. Erlangen, Germany: Vorstand der Fränkischen Geographischen Gesellschaft. ISBN 3-920405-41-2.
- Karmon, Y. (1960). "An Analysis of Jacotin's Map of Palestine" (PDF). Israel Exploration Journal. 10 (3, 4): 155–173, 244–253. Archived from the original (PDF) on 2019-12-22.
- Mills, E., ed. (1932). Census of Palestine 1931. Population of Villages, Towns and Administrative Areas. Jerusalem: Government of Palestine.
- Palmer, E.H. (1881). The Survey of Western Palestine: Arabic and English Name Lists Collected During the Survey by Lieutenants Conder and Kitchener, R. E. Transliterated and Explained by E.H. Palmer. Committee of the Palestine Exploration Fund.
- Pringle, D. (1997). Secular buildings in the Crusader Kingdom of Jerusalem: an archaeological Gazetter. Cambridge University Press. ISBN 0-521-46010-7.
- Rhode, H. (1979). Administration and Population of the Sancak of Safed in the Sixteenth Century. Columbia University. Archived from the original on 2019-04-20.
- Robinson, E.; Smith, E. (1841). Biblical Researches in Palestine, Mount Sinai and Arabia Petraea: A Journal of Travels in the year 1838. Vol. 3. Boston: Crocker & Brewster.
- Schumacher, G. (1888). "Population list of the Liwa of Akka". Quarterly Statement - Palestine Exploration Fund. 20: 169–191.
- Tsafrir, Y.; Leah Di Segni; Judith Green (1994). (TIR): Tabula Imperii Romani: Judaea, Palaestina. Jerusalem: Israel Academy of Sciences and Humanities. ISBN 965-208-107-8.
