= Helenopolis (Palaestina Secunda) =

Historical Byzantine town and see

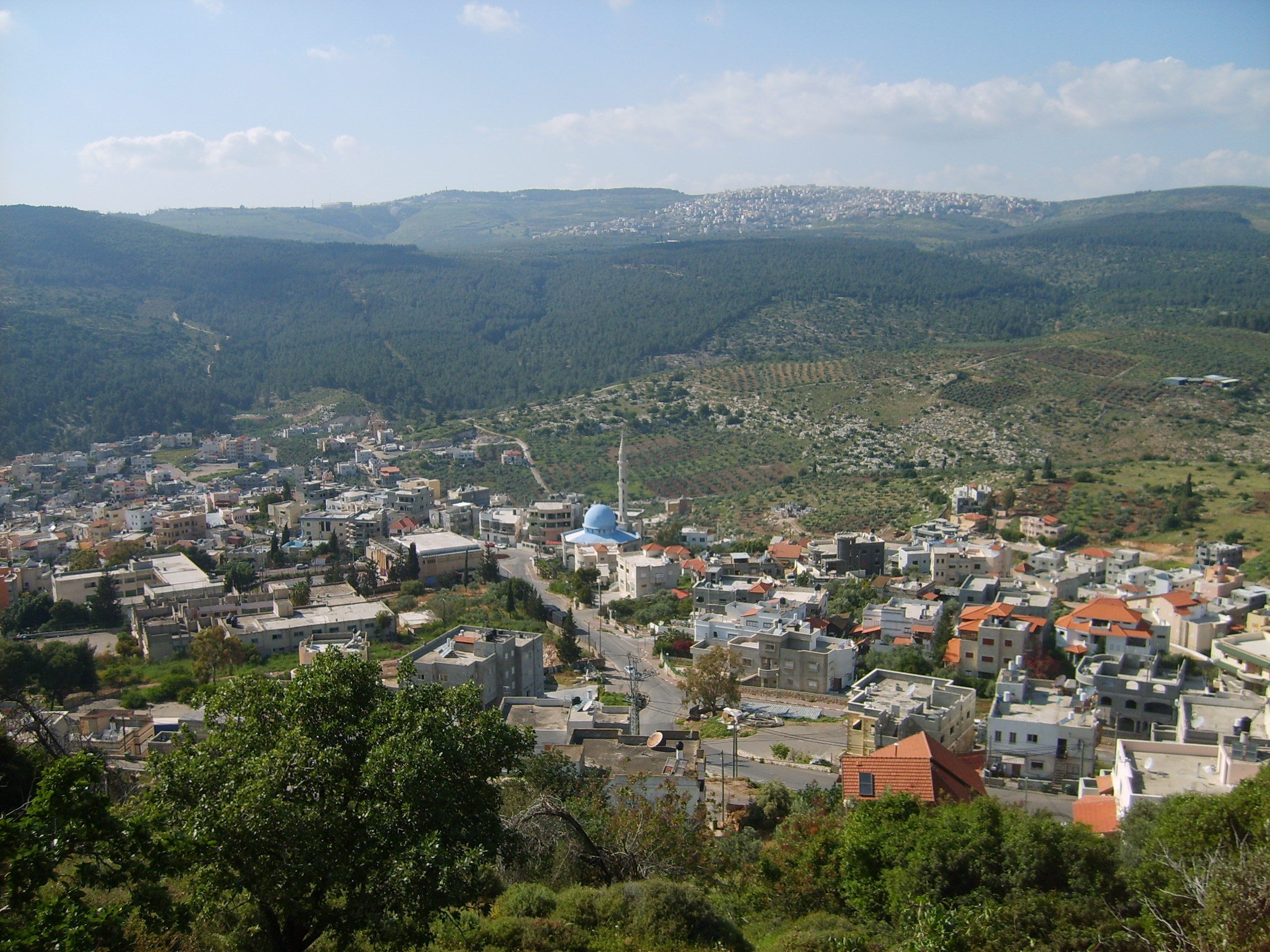
Daburiyya Mount Tabor

Helenopolis (Greek: Ἑλενόπολις) was a town and episcopal see in the former Roman province of Palaestina Secunda, in the Byzantine Empire. It was named for the mother of Constantine the Great, Helena. It is identified as either modern Daburiyya or with Kfar Kama, both in Israel.

As a diocese that is no longer residential, it is listed in the Annuario Pontificio among titular sees of the Roman Catholic Church. Its last titular bishop was John Francis Hackett.
