= Circassian Heritage Center =

The Circassian Heritage Center: המרכז למורשת הצ'רקסית (Hebrew)
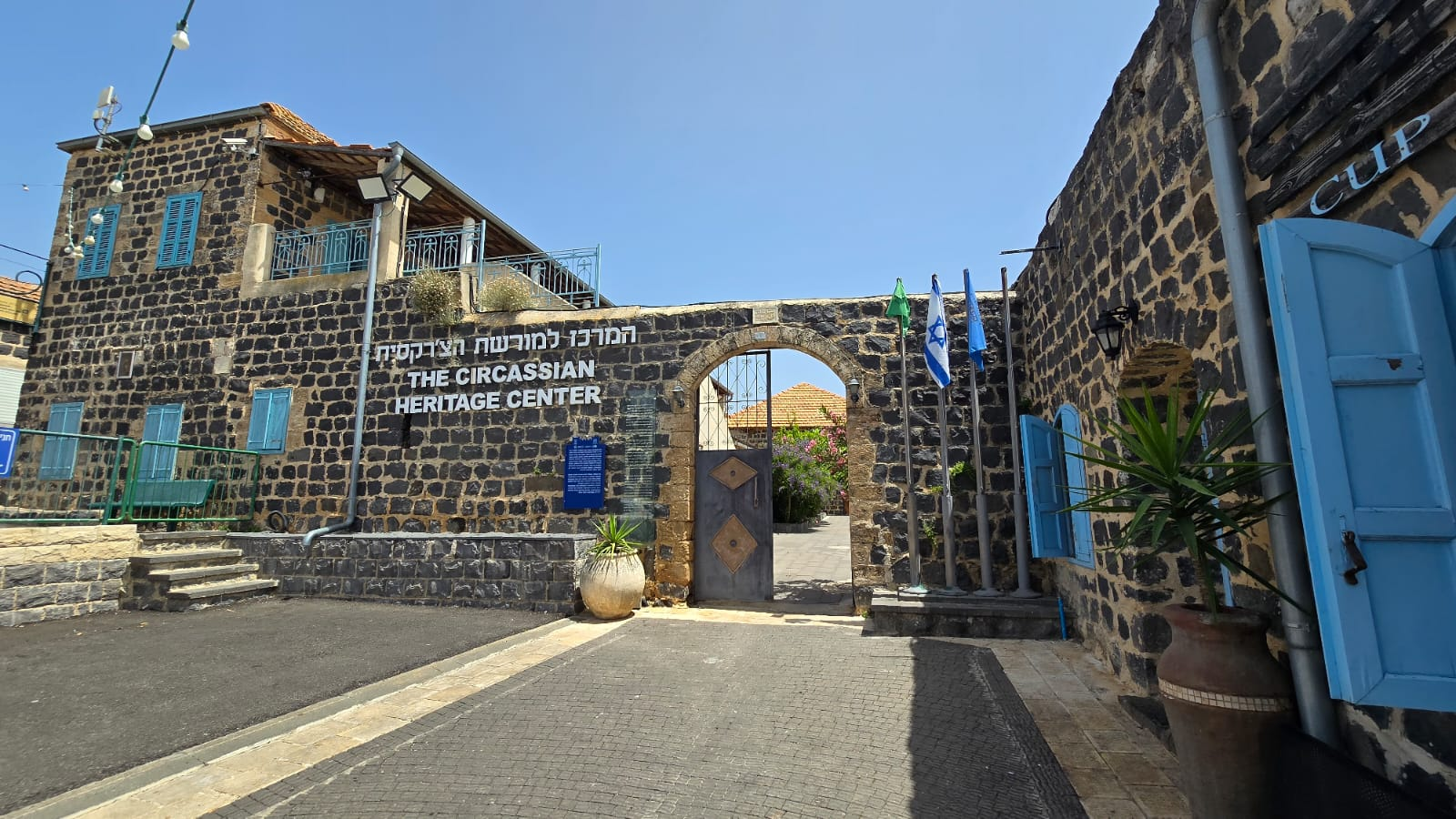

- Location within Northeast Israel
- Country: Israel
- District: Northern
- Founded: 2010
- Founder: Zakaria Thawcho, Zohar Thawcho, Aibek Napso
- Website: https://chckk.org.il/

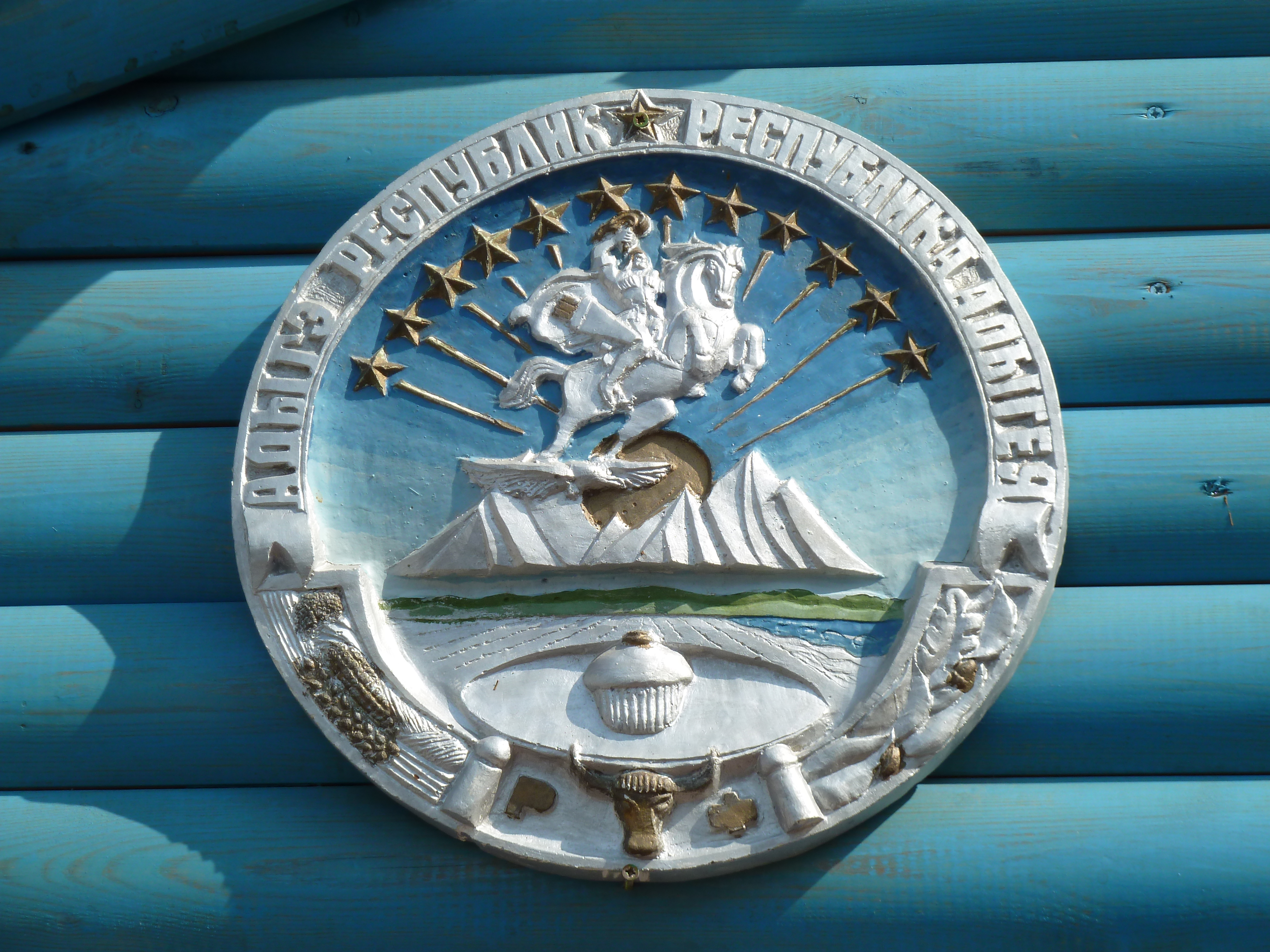
Coat of Arms of Adygea in the Circassian Heritage Center of Kfar Kama

The Circassian Heritage Center (Adyghe: Адыгэ Музей - Адыгэ КъыкIэныгъэ Гупчэ) is a heritage site and visitor center that reviews the history and heritage of the Circassian people. In the center there is a museum that displays authentic items from the Circassian heritage, as well as an academic research institute for the study of the Circassians.

The center was established in 2010 by Zakaria Thawcho, Zohar Thawcho and Aibek Napso and is currently managed by the Kfar Kama local council.

On the site is the official Circassian Museum which was recognized as a heritage site by the Council for Conservation of Heritage Sites in Israel and by the Landmarks Program.

== The Official Circassian Museum ==
The Circassians ruled for thousands of years in the mountains of the northwest of the Caucasus, but in the new era they found themselves living in a diaspora around the world, including in Israel. The official Circassian museum presents the story of the Circassian people.

The Circassian Museum is housed in an old house built at the end of the 19th century and is located in the heart of the old neighborhood of Kfar Kama. The building, which was the home of the Shahlacho family, one of the oldest families in the village and known to the public as the Beit Shami, underwent general building conservation and was adapted to the needs of the museum. All of its components as a Circassian house have been beautifully preserved, and are used today for illustration, such as: the foyer, the kitchen, the special guest room, cistern, inner rooms and the wing that is used today as a space for the museum displays which was the backyard that existed as an integral part of every house Circassian, as well as the high wall around the building, built entirely of black basalt stones.

The exhibition wing is rich and contains extremely rare items originating from the Caucasus Mountains, such as the special weapons of the Circassian knight, his clothes and the variety of equipment he used in his preparation for battle. Also displayed are the colorful clothes of the Circassian woman together with other items of clothing, fabrics with special embroidery (handicraft) and bead ornaments, as well as the Circassian musical instruments and more. Some of the most interesting exhibits are the cradle and the walker, which were used in the past to raise babies and prepare them for independence from a young age. The most impressive exhibit in the museum is "hard Circassian cheese" which was produced in 1980 in the shape of a Circassian dagger and is the oldest cheese in Israel. According to the Circassian tradition, it was customary to smoke the cheeses in the hearth for three weeks to bring it to a state where the cheese would be preserved and edible for many years. The cheese was prepared by the Bejadoj family in Jordan and was brought to Israel in 2010 by Aibek Napso.

The visit to the museum includes a lecture on the Circassian language, watching the film "Circassian Heritage" and a guided tour of the museum rooms accompanied by a local guide who explains the various exhibits in Hebrew, English, Russian, Arabic and Circassian. This is one of the few museums in the world where every visitor receives a close guide who accompanies him throughout the tour even if it is a couple of visitors. This policy of the Circassian Heritage Center to attach a guide to each visitor is part of the importance of spreading the Circassian culture in Israel and around the world.

== The establishment of the Circassian Heritage Center ==
In 2010, the Kfar Kama local council decided to open a tender for the establishment of a "Circassian Heritage Center" which will serve as a visitor center containing a Circassian museum. The Council put Beit Shami for the winner of the tender for the purpose of establishing a heritage center within it. In May 2010, a contract was signed between the founders of the Circassian Museum, who won the tender, and the Kfar Kama local council, in which the winner will operate the Circassian Heritage Center for 5 years until 2015. At the end of the contract, the tenants were given an extension to continue operating the Heritage Center until 2019, when the local council Kfar Kama decided not to renew the contract with the tenants and thus end the contract with them and return the heritage center to the public authority.

== The Circassian Heritage Center Today ==
Today the Circassian Heritage Center is managed and maintained by the Kfar Kama local council and serves as an international Circassian Heritage Center and as a public visitor center and is owned by the local council. The center receives thousands of visitors every month who are exposed to the history and culture of the Circassian people. On holidays and record events of the local authority, the Heritage Center puts on a holiday and combines colorful dance performances, the most important of which is the annual Circassian festival that takes place every year in July. Also, various cultural events such as Circassian Heritage Week, memorial ceremonies for the Circassian Genocide and local landmarks, among them bicycle event of Kfar Kama (Sovev Kfar Kama ), are held at the Circassian Heritage Center.

== Tourism achievements ==
Thanks to the many activities of the Circassian Heritage Center in the development and promotion of tourism in Kfar Kama at the world level. In 2022, the settlement of Kfar Kama was declared among the 32 tourist villages recommended to visit by the UNWTO United Nations World Tourism Organization.

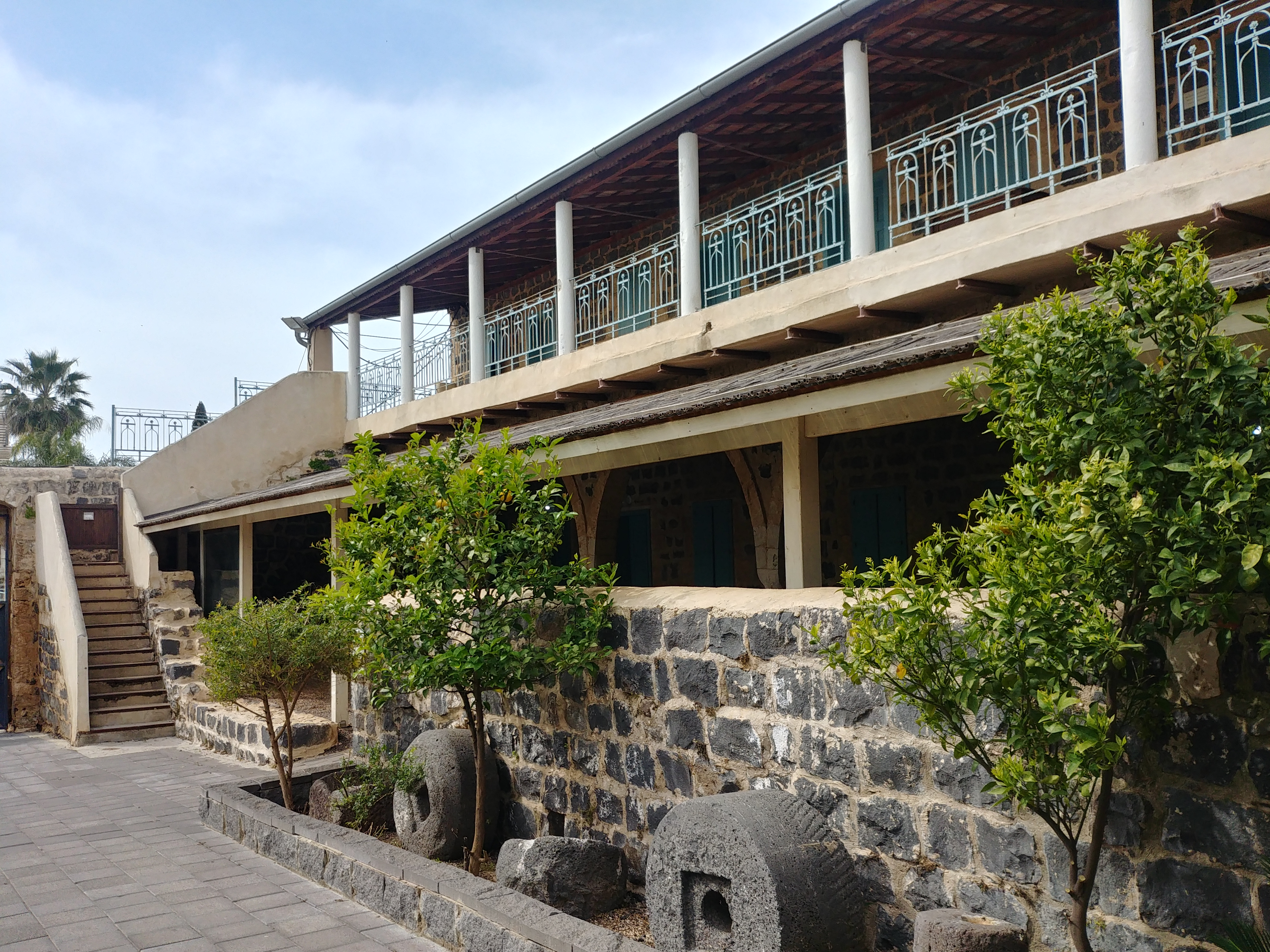

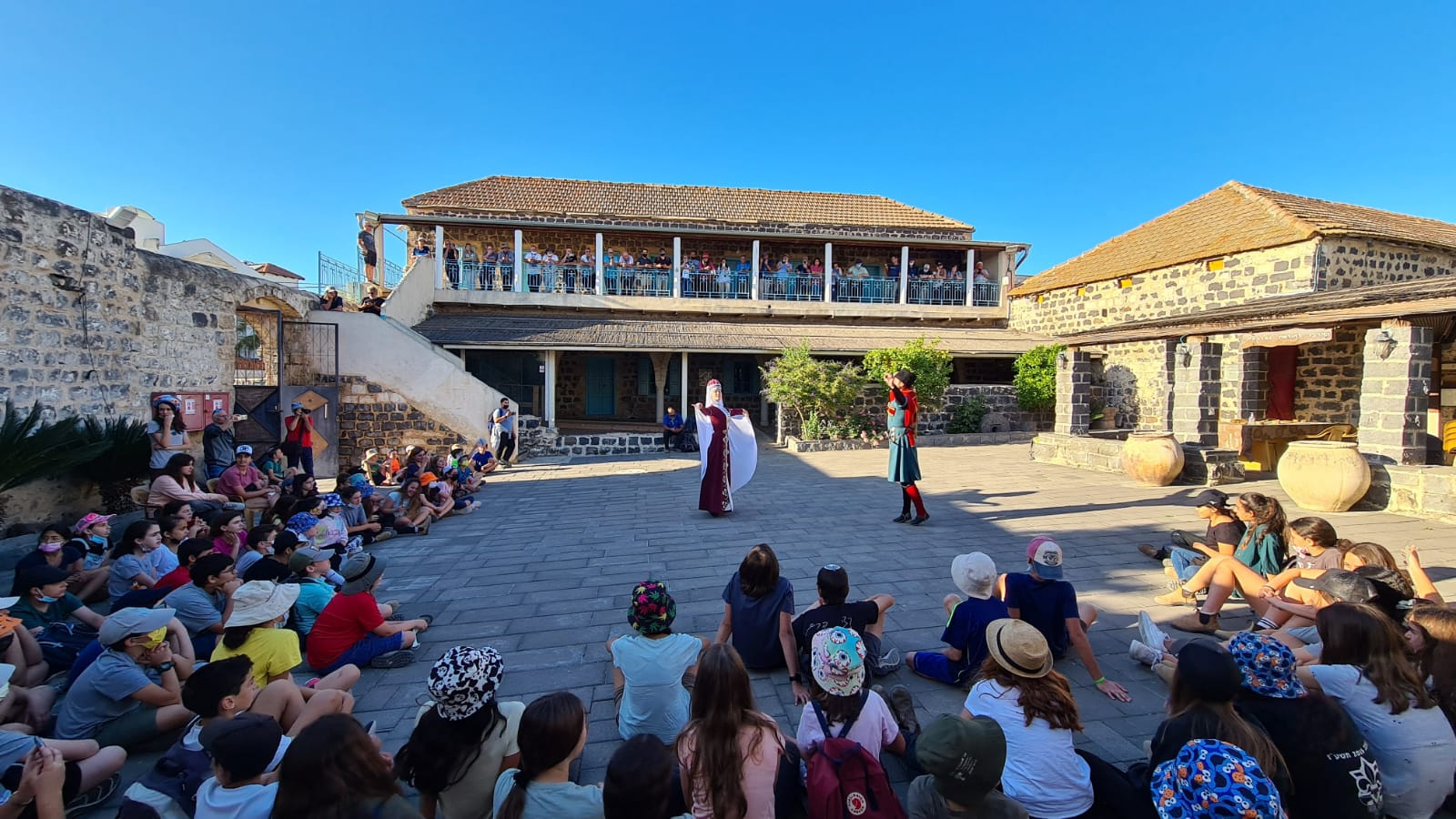

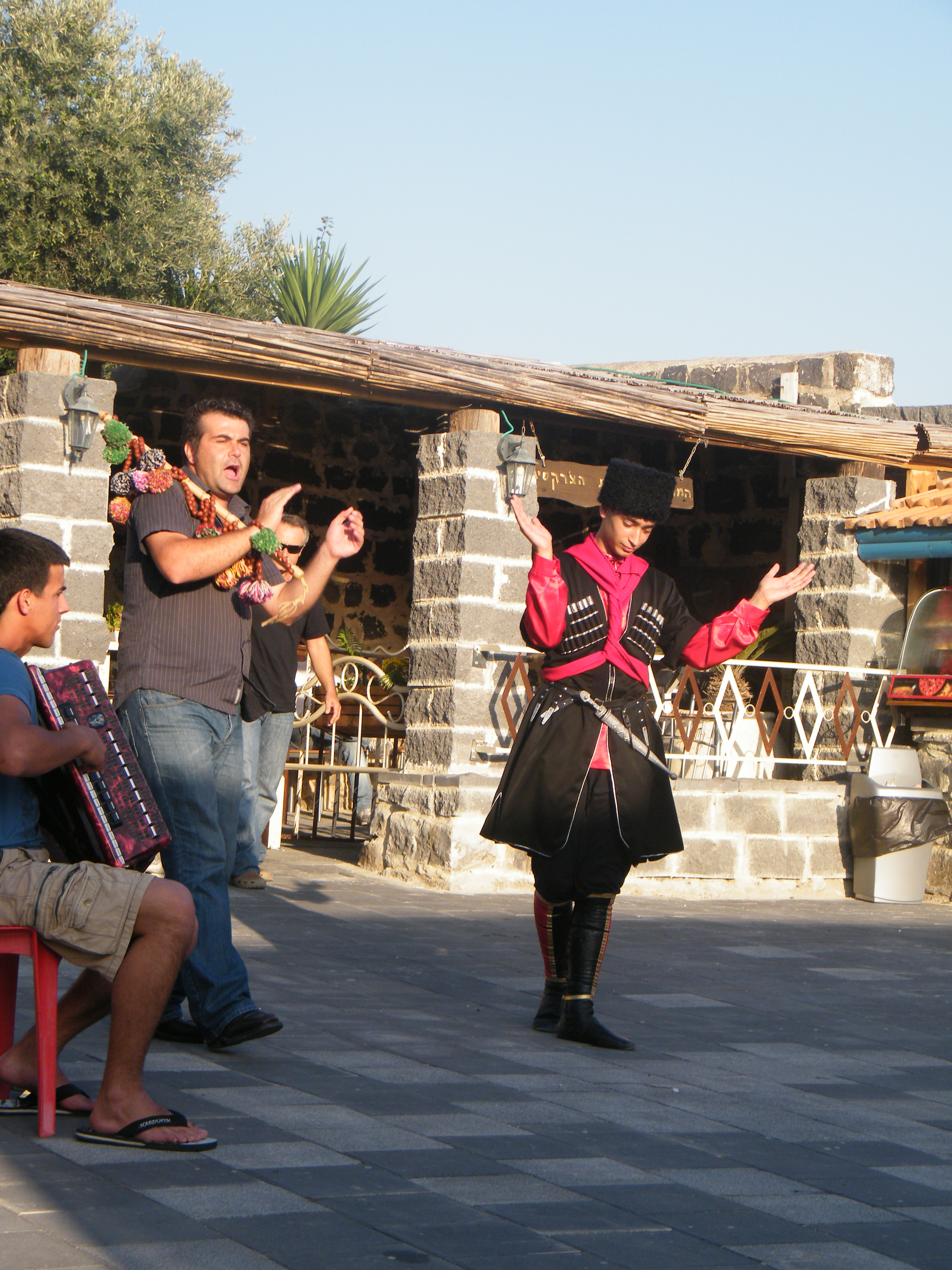

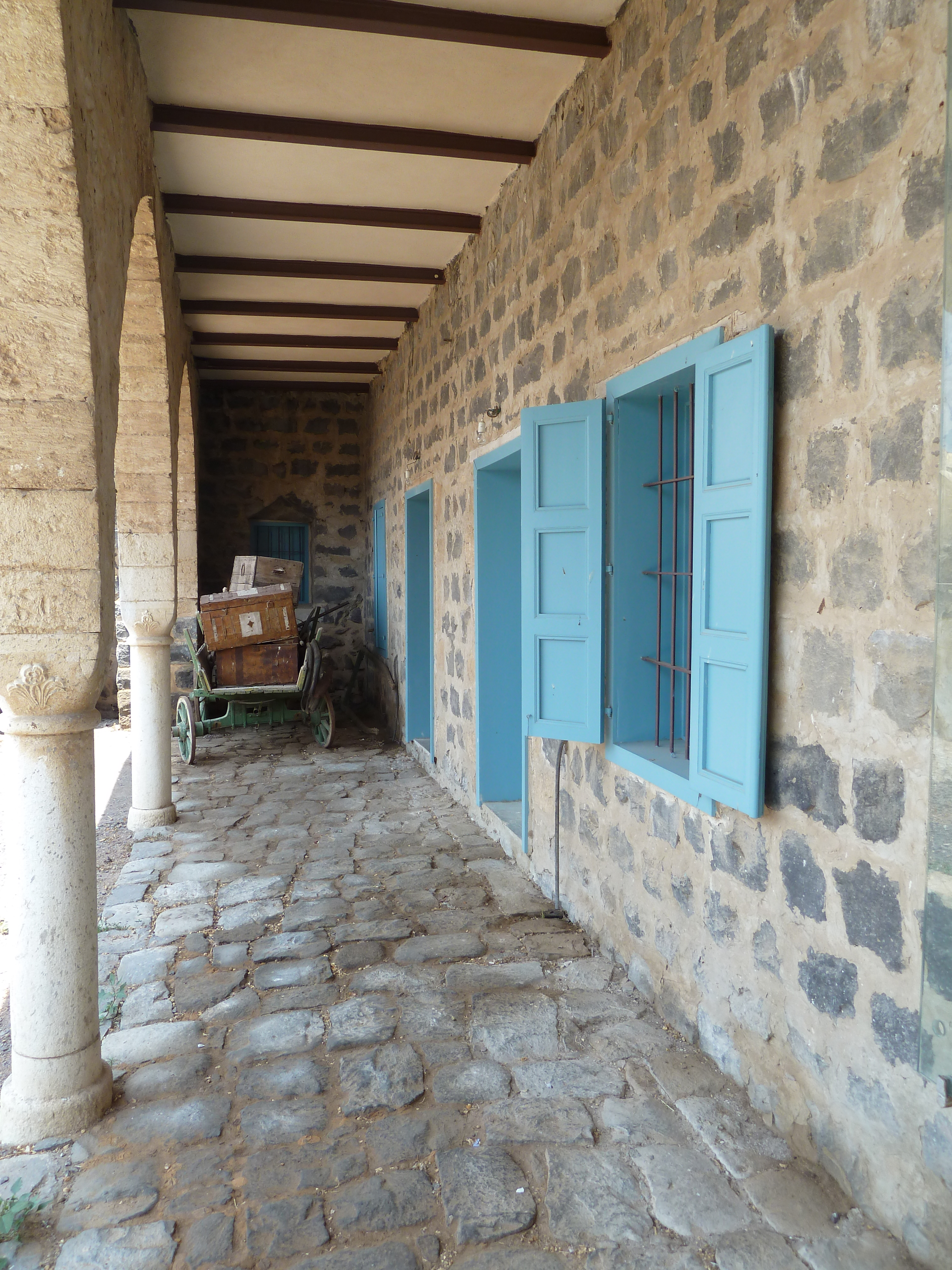

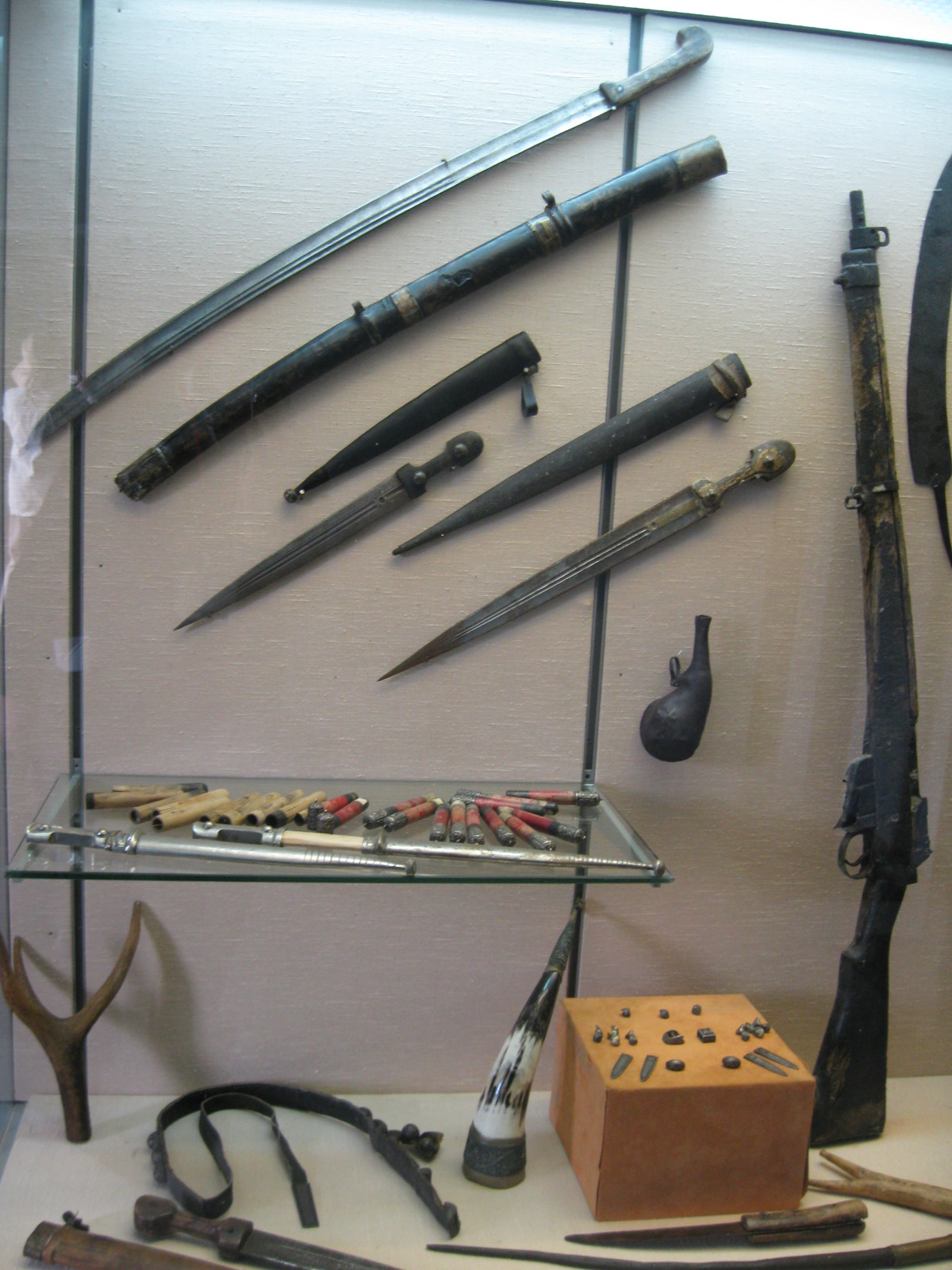
