= Nili Natkho =

Circassian-Israeli basketball player

Nili Natkho נילי נאתכו
Personal information
- Born: February 18, 1982 Kfar Kama, Israel
- Died: November 5, 2004 (aged 22)

Career information
- High school: Even Yehuda
- Position: Shooting guard
- Number: 6

Career history
- 1999–2002: Maccabi Raanana
- 2003–2004: Elitzur Ramla

Nili Natkho (Hebrew: נילי נאתכו; February 18, 1982 – November 5, 2004) was a Circassian-Israeli basketball player who played for Maccabi Raanana and Elitzur Ramla. Natkho died in a car accident at the age of 22.

Her cousin is the prominent Circassian-Israeli footballer Bibras Natkho.

== Biography ==
Natkho was born the Circassian village of Kfar Kama in northern Israel, to a Circassian-Muslim family.

Natkho played in a junior Futsal team in the village of Kfar Tavor where she was identified as having great potential. She was referred to a training camp at the Wingate Institute and the family, recognizing her athletic abilities, supported her as much as they could. When she turned 14, the family moved to Even Yehuda so she could join Even Yehuda's high school basketball team for girls.

In her first season, Natkho led the team to its first title in the history of the team - the State Cup. The following year, she transferred to Ostrovsky High School in Ra'anana, where played on the school team for three years. During her last year in high school, in 2000, her team won the national high school basketball championship.

That year, Natkho began playing in the Premier League team Maccabi Raanana. Her breakthrough came a year later, when she was named "discovery" of the season. During her first two seasons in Maccabi Raanana, the team won the State Cup. During her third season with Maccabi Raanana (2001/02 ) Natkho scored an average of 13.7 points per game, making her Israel's best Shooting guard of that season.

In 2003, after four seasons with Maccabi Raanana, Natkho was transferred, along with her coach Tal Nathan, to the Elitzur Ramla basketball team. During her first season with the team, the team won the national cup.

In 2002, Natkho was invited for the first time to play in adult basketball teams. In 2003, she took part in the European Women Basketball Championship held in Greece.

Two months prior to Natkho's death, after many years of living outside Kfar Kama, the family returned to the village.

Natkho managed to play two games during her second season with the Elitzur Ramla basketball team before her untimely death.

=== Death ===
On the evening of November 5, 2004, Natkho was driving her car. There were four passengers with her. On Highway 767, near her parents' house in Kfar Kama, she swerved into the opposite lane and collided with a Jeep.

Both Natkho (aged 22) and her sister Diana (aged 19) were killed instantly, while their cousin Raja Tlash (aged 24) died shortly afterwards in the hospital. The two other passengers in the car, relatives of Natkho, were severely injured.
