= Bibars Natcho =

Israeli footballer (born 1988)

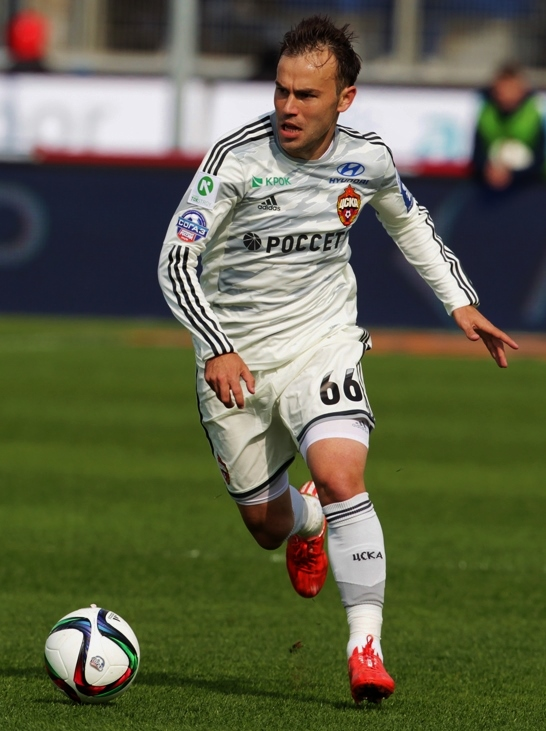
- Natcho with CSKA Moscow in 2015

Personal information
- Full name: Bibars Natcho
- Date of birth: 18 February 1988 (age 38)
- Place of birth: Kfar Kama, Israel
- Height: 1.77 m (5 ft 10 in)
- Position: Midfielder

Youth career
- Hapoel Tel Aviv

Senior career*
Years	Team	Apps	(Gls)
2006–2010	Hapoel Tel Aviv	91	(5)
2010–2014	Rubin Kazan	104	(21)
2014	PAOK	17	(3)
2014–2018	CSKA Moscow	101	(24)
2018–2019	Olympiacos	21	(1)
2019–2026	Partizan	222	(74)
Total		556	(128)

International career^{‡}
2004–2005	Israel U17	12	(3)
2006–2007	Israel U19	14	(7)
2007–2010	Israel U21	23	(5)
2010–2023	Israel	88	(4)
- * Club domestic league appearances and goals as of 23 May 2026 ‡ National team caps and goals as of 25 March 2023

Bibars Natcho (Adyghe: Натхъо Бибэрс, Hebrew: ביברס נאתכו; born 18 February 1988) is an Israeli retired professional footballer who played as a midfielder.

During his 20-year-long career, Natcho played for six clubs in four countries and amassed nearly 800 competitive appearances, mostly with Partizan during his seven seasons at the Serbian club.

Natcho made his senior international debut for Israel in 2010, after previously being capped by the under-17, under-19, and under-21 teams, and won 88 full caps. Natcho became captain of the Israel national football team in 2018. He retired in 2026 at the age of 38.

== Biography ==
Natcho was born in Kfar Kama, Israel, to a Circassian-Israeli Muslim family. His ancestors were deported from Circassia to Turkey; his grandfather emigrated from Turkey to mandatory Palestine. His father Akram Natkho served in the Israel Border Police (Magav), and died of cardiac arrest in 2008. His cousin, Circassian-Israeli basketball player Nili Natkho, died in 2004 in a car accident in northern Israel. His younger cousin Amir Natkho joined CSKA in 2015 as well. His uncle, Amir's father, Adam Natkho is also a former footballer from Russia.

Natcho adheres to Islam. He is married to Circassian-Israeli fashion designer Talia Ashmoz-Natcho, and together they have three children. His eldest son was born in 2012 and is named after Natcho's late father.

On 8 July 2022, Natcho acquired Serbian citizenship.

== Club career ==
=== Hapoel Tel Aviv ===
Natcho joined Israeli club Hapoel Tel Aviv's youth team with fellow Israel youth international Ben Sahar, moving through the ranks up to the first team at the start of the 2006–07 season, winning the Israel State Cup during that season. Throughout the years, Natcho became an important player in Hapoel and in the Israeli national youth teams. Natcho made his Israeli Premier League debut coming on as a substitute against Maccabi Netanya on 18 November 2006.

Natcho's first professional goal was against NK Široki Brijeg during the 2nd leg of the 2007–08 UEFA Cup second qualifying round at Bloomfield Stadium. After the arrival of Israeli coach Eli Guttman during the 2007–08 season, Natcho became a main part of the team, scoring his first league goal against Maccabi Petah Tikva F.C. on 9 February 2008. Natcho made a few impressive performances at the beginning of the 2009–10 UEFA Europa League helping Hapoel finish top of Group C, ending the European campaign drawing 0–0 on a raining evening and losing 0–3 away at the Central Stadium.

=== Rubin Kazan ===
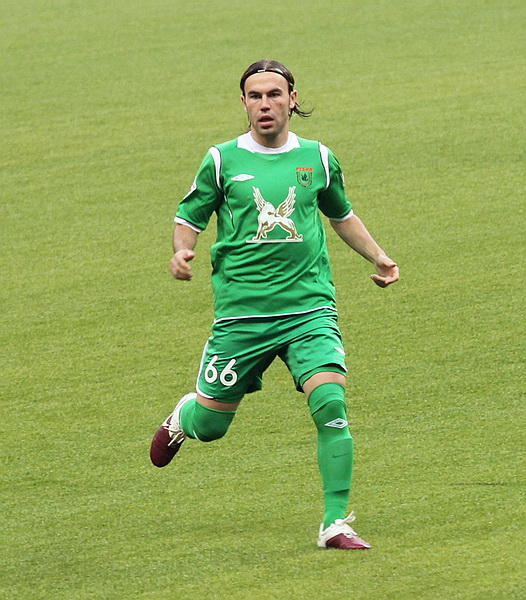
Natcho playing for Rubin Kazan in 2010

After losing 0–3 on aggregate in the Round of 32 of Europa League, Natcho moved to the eventual "European Dream" killers Rubin Kazan on 8 March 2010, signing a four-year deal with this Russian club. with transfer fee of €650,000 paid to Hapoel Tel Aviv. Natcho then scored his first goal for the club, on 17 April 2010, in a 1–0 win over Amkar Perm. His second goal came in a 2–1 win over Rostov on 16 October 2010. However, injuries limited his playing time, as he made 14 appearances and scored twice.

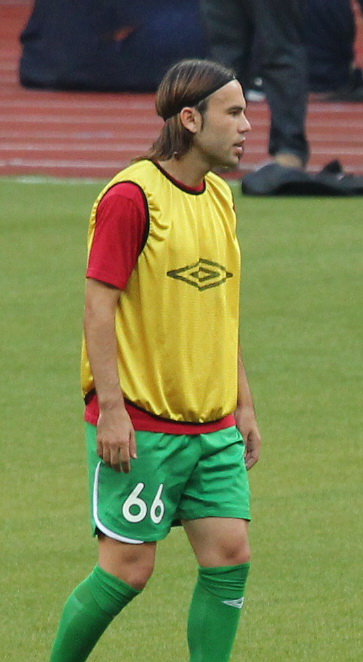
Natcho with Rubin Kazan in 2010

Natcho started the 2011–12 season with a goal in a 4–1 win over Tom Tomsk on 27 May 2011. His second goal of the season came on 14 June 2011, in a 3–0 win over Dynamo Moscow. As a result of his performance, Natcho was named Team of The Week Matchday 13. Elsewhere, Natcho scored two goals in the Champions League qualifier against Dynamo Kyiv and Lyon, who they eliminated Kazan out of the competitions and the club would play in the Europa League. Then in the Europa League campaign, Natcho scored twice in six matches in the group stage of the Europa League against Tottenham Hostpur and Shamrock Rovers. Natcho performance was praised for his role during the season and helped the club win the Russian Cup after playing a vital of assisting the winning goal, in a 1–0 win over Dynamo Moscow. Natcho made 56 appearances and scored 14 goals in all competitions. Also at the end of the year, Natcho was voted by the club's supporters as the best player of the year.

At the start of the 2012–13 season, Natcho continuously made a good start for the club when he scored six goals in the first six matches against Krasnodar, twice against Alania Vladikavkaz, Dynamo Moscow, Spartak Moscow and Zenit Saint Petersburg. Soon after, Natcho started negotiating over a new three-year contract with the club that would keep him until 2016. However, the negotiations changed again to a one-year contract a month later. Despite a contract negotiations, which is yet reported,

Natcho scored his sixth goal of the season, on 11 November 2012, in a 2–0 win over Krylia Sovetov Samara. It would later be revealed that the delay to Natcho's new contract was over the future of Manager Kurban Berdyev. In the quarter final of the Europa League, Natcho scored two goals (both coming from penalty) in both legs, as Rubin Kazan lose 5–4 on aggregate against Chelsea. Natcho would add two more goals later in the season against Lokomotiv Moscow and Krasnodar. At the end of the 2012–13 season, Natcho wasn't only named by Sports.ru as one of the top players in the Russian league, but team of the year. However, Natcho's agent revealed that Natcho had yet to reach an agreement over a new contract.

In the 2013–14 season, Natcho started his season when he scored in the second round of first leg of the Europa League, in a 3–2 win over Jagodina. Rubin Kazan would win in the return leg and would progress to the group stage. With his uncertainty of his future, as his contract with the club expires in six months time, it announced that Natcho would stay at the club for the remaining months until January. In the Europa League, Natcho played a vital role of assisting goals in the qualifying round and group stages. He would score three goals in six matches of the group stage, against Zulte Waregem and Maribor. In conclusion of the Europa League group stage, UEFA named Natcho in the Team of the Group Stage. Natcho scored a league goal, on 2 December 2013, in a 3–0 win over Amkar Perm.

Natcho was named in the Team of the Season of the Europa League in the 2013–14 season. In the comments on his inclusion, UEFA said: "Probably Rubin's top performer over the last three years, the Israeli international dominates midfield, supplying assists and delivering great set pieces".

In the winter break of the season, it was announced that Natcho would leave the club upon expiry of his contract. Natcho cited the departure of Manager Berdyev as the reason of his departure. After leaving the club, Natcho hinted playing in the Bundesliga since it fits his playing style. Natcho rejected a latest contract from Rubin Kazan despite having increase wages. During his career at Rubin Kazan, he was sometimes referred to as the 'best foreigner' in the Russian league and made 104 appearances and scored 21 times.

=== PAOK ===
On 28 January 2014, Natcho arrived in Thessaloniki, Greece, to discuss a possible contract with PAOK. As his contract with Rubin Kazan and sponsorship of 123pame expired he could move to PAOK as a free transfer. The next day Natcho joined the club, signing a six-month contract. His first goal for the club on 5 February 2014, in a 5–0 win against OFI, followed by his second, in a 2–0 win over Atromitos on 6 April 2014. Having made a good display, Natcho was awarded Player of the Month in March. Natcho would help the club reach the final of Greek Cup, but received a yellow card during the match, which cause him to miss out for the final match. At the end of the season, it announced that Natcho was released by the club upon expiry of his contract.

=== CSKA Moscow ===
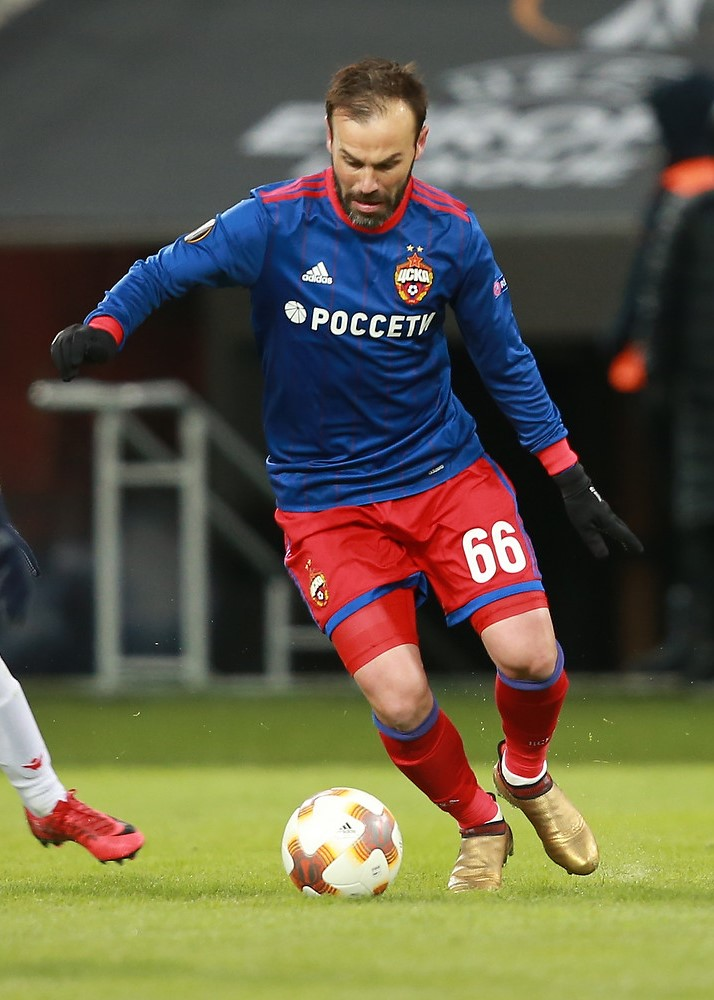
Natcho playing for CSKA Moscow in 2018

After six months at Greece, Natcho returned to Russia, where he joined CSKA Moscow on a four-year contract.

Natcho scored his first goal for the club, which is against his former club, in a 2–1 loss on 18 August 2014. After the match, Natcho felt he owned an apology to Rubin Kazan's supporters. Natcho then scored a hat-trick on 31 August 2014, in a 6–0 win over Rostov. On 21 October 2014, Natcho scored his first Champions League goal for CSKA Moscow with a penalty in the 86th minute against Manchester City. Five days later, Natcho scored a brace, as CSKA Moscow drew 3–3 with Ural Yekaterinburg.

Natcho provided two assists in the 2–1 victory over Manchester City in a Champions League group stage game. At the end of the 2014–15 season, Natcho scored 12 goals, gave 8 assists, and was placed in the "Team of the Season". He ended the season being the top scorer of CSKA. In a game against Dynamo Moscow on 5 October 2015 he suffered a slight concussion and was bleeding. Despite that, he insisted on continuing playing (his manager substituted him despite his protests). He left CSKA upon the expiration of his contract on 2 June 2018.

=== Olympiacos ===
After four years at Russia, Natcho returned to Greece, where he joined Olympiacos on a two-year contract. A year later he mutually ended his contract with the club.

=== Partizan ===
On 19 August 2019, Natcho signed a three-year contract with Serbian club Partizan and chose the number 6 shirt. He made his Partizan debut three days later coming on as a 73rd-minute sub in the UEFA Europa League play-off game against Molde. His first goals came on 19 September 2019 when he scored a brace in a 2–2 home draw with AZ Alkmaar in the first matchday of the Europa League group stage.

Natcho scored his first Belgrade Derby goal on 10 June 2020, in a 1–0 Serbian Cup semi-final win. He finished his first season in Partizan with 32 appearances, 11 goals and 9 assists, across three competitions.

Natcho scored his second Belgrade Derby goal on 19 September 2021 in a 1–1 home draw Serbian SuperLiga game week 9, the Israeli shot diagonally from the right side with his weaker left foot and shook the net of Milan Borjan. On 12 February 2022, in a 0–2 league win at Radnički Niš, Natcho became only the fourth foreign player in Partizan history to record the 100th official cap.

Natcho was voted Player of the Week 13 in Serbian SuperLiga after scoring a brace and recording one assist in a 4–1 victory against Vojvodina in Derby of Serbia. On 3 March 2023 Natcho made his 152nd appearance for Partizan and became the foreign player with the most appearances for the club, surpassing the previous record holder Lamine Diarra. On 12 March 2023 Natcho scored his 50th goal in the Partizan jersey in a 0–3 win away at Mladost Lučani.

==== Retirement ====
On 18 April 2026, Natcho announced he will be retiring at the end of the season from professional football after the Belgrade Derby. On 23 May 2026 Natcho officially retired after scoring his last goal against FK Radnik Surdulica to secure a 5–0 victory.

== International career ==
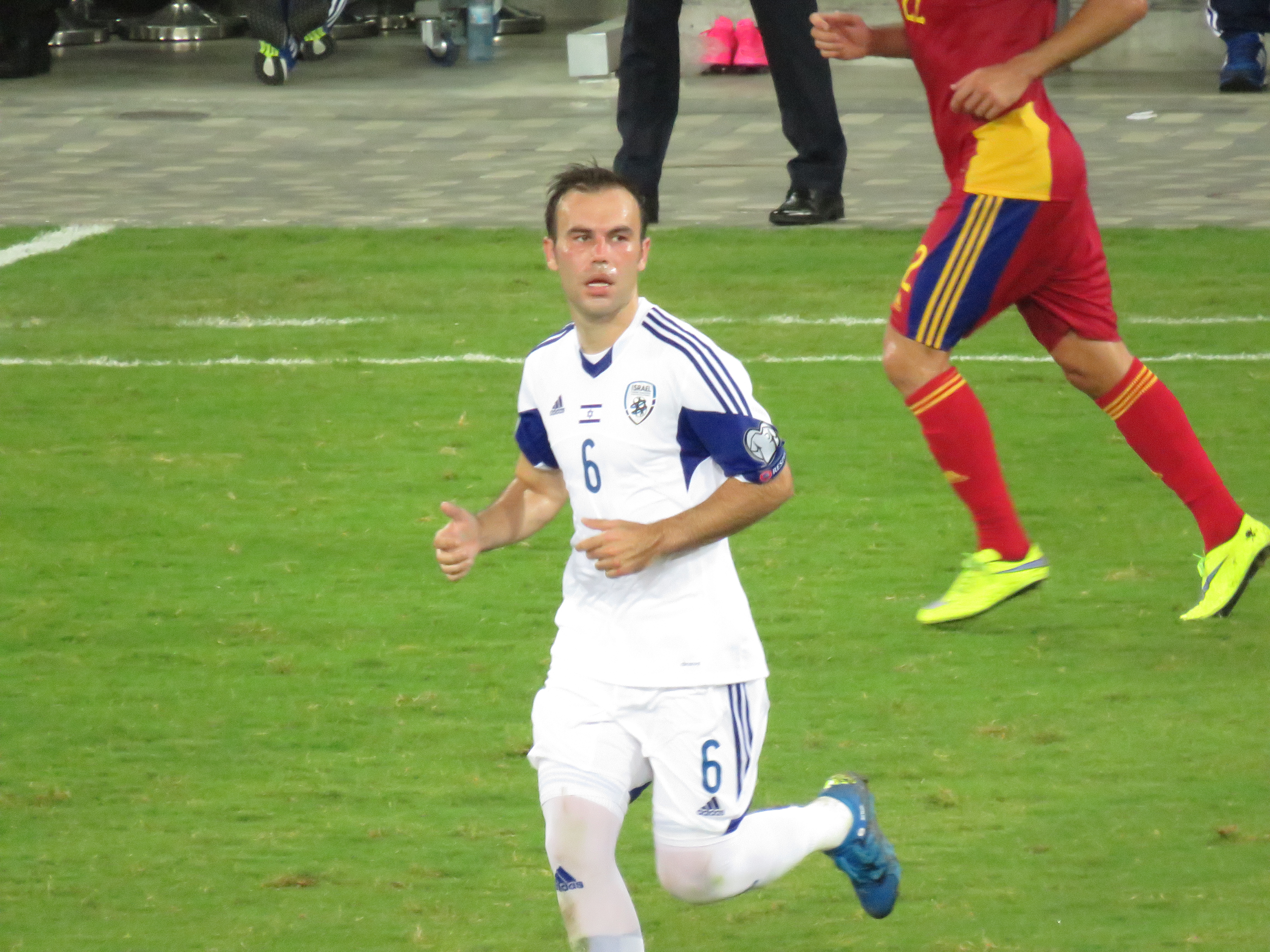
Natcho playing for Israel in 2015

Throughout his career, Natcho has played for nearly every Israeli national team together with his colleague, Beram Kayal. He represented the national team at the Valeri Lobanovsky Memorial Tournament 2007 that was victorious for it. As a former captain of the Israel under-19 team, Natcho was called up for the senior team friendly match held 12 August 2009 against Northern Ireland, but wasn't capped. Natcho made his first appearance for the senior side in a friendly match against Romania on 3 March 2010, when he came on as a substitute. He scored his first international goal against Azerbaijan on 7 September 2012.

In 2018, he became the first captain of the Israel national team of either Circassian or Muslim origin.

On 25 March 2023, he retired from international football.

== Career statistics ==
=== Club ===
As of 23 May 2026

Appearances and goals by club, season and competition
Club	Season	League			National cup (Note: Includes Israel State Cup, Russian Cup, Greek Cup, Serbian Cup)		League cup (Note: Includes Toto Cup)		Europe		Other		Total	
Club	Season	Division	Apps	Goals	Apps	Goals	Apps	Goals	Apps	Goals	Apps	Goals	Apps	Goals
Hapoel Tel Aviv	2006–07	Israeli Premier League	11	0	4	0	4	0	1	0	—		20	0
Hapoel Tel Aviv	2007–08	Israeli Premier League	26	4	5	0	4	0	8	1	—		43	5
Hapoel Tel Aviv	2008–09	Israeli Premier League	30	1	2	0	7	0	6 (Note: Appearances in UEFA Cup)	0	—		45	1
Hapoel Tel Aviv	2009–10	Israeli Premier League	24	0	1	0	1	0	12 (Note: Appearances in UEFA Europa League)	2	—		38	2
Hapoel Tel Aviv	Total		91	5	12	0	16	0	27	3	—		146	8
Rubin Kazan	2010	Russian Premier League	14	2	0	0	—		6 (Note: Four appearances in UEFA Champions League, two appearances in UEFA Europa League)	0	0	0	20	2
Rubin Kazan	2011–12	Russian Premier League	41	9	3	0	—		12 (Note: Four appearances and two goals in UEFA Champions League, eight appearances and three goals in UEFA Europa League)	5	—		56	14
Rubin Kazan	2012–13	Russian Premier League	30	9	0	0	—		11	2	0	0	41	11
Rubin Kazan	2013–14	Russian Premier League	19	1	0	0	—		11	4	—		30	5
Rubin Kazan	Total		104	21	3	0	—		40	11	0	0	147	32
PAOK	2013–14	Super League Greece	17	3	3	0	—		0	0	—		20	3
CSKA Moscow	2014–15	Russian Premier League	26	12	2	1	—		6 (Note: Appearances in UEFA Champions League)	1	0	0	34	14
CSKA Moscow	2015–16	Russian Premier League	20	2	3	0	—		8	0	—		31	2
CSKA Moscow	2016–17	Russian Premier League	26	6	1	0	—		5	1	1 (Note: Appearance in Russian Super Cup)	0	33	7
CSKA Moscow	2017–18	Russian Premier League	29	4	1	0	—		14 (Note: Eight appearances and one goal in UEFA Champions League, six appearances in UEFA Europa League)	1	—		44	5
CSKA Moscow	Total		101	24	7	1	—		33	3	1	0	142	28
Olympiacos	2018–19	Super League Greece	21	1	5	0	—		8	0	—		34	1
Partizan	2019–20	Serbian SuperLiga	22	8	3	1	—		7	2	—		32	11
Partizan	2020–21	Serbian SuperLiga	33	12	5	1	—		3	2	—		41	15
Partizan	2021–22	Serbian SuperLiga	30	10	3	0	—		13 (Note: Appearances in UEFA Europa Conference League)	1	—		46	11
Partizan	2022–23	Serbian SuperLiga	36	12	0	0	—		10 (Note: Two appearances in UEFA Europa League, eight appearances and one goal in UEFA Europa Conference League)	1	—		46	13
Partizan	2023–24	Serbian SuperLiga	34	11	4	0	—		4	1	—		42	12
Partizan	2024–25	Serbian SuperLiga	35	15	3	0	—		6	0	—		44	15
Partizan	2025–26	Serbian SuperLiga	32	6	1	0	—		5	0	—		38	6
Partizan	Total		222	74	19	2	—		48	7	—		289	83
Career total			556	128	49	3	16	0	156	24	1	0	778	155

=== International ===
As of match played 25 March 2023

Appearances and goals by national team and year
National team	Year	Apps	Goals
Israel	2010	6	0
Israel	2011	7	0
Israel	2012	9	1
Israel	2013	8	0
Israel	2014	6	0
Israel	2015	5	0
Israel	2016	2	0
Israel	2017	6	0
Israel	2018	7	0
Israel	2019	10	1
Israel	2020	7	0
Israel	2021	11	1
Israel	2022	3	1
Israel	2023	1	0
Total		88	4

Scores and results list Israel's goal tally first.

List of international goals scored by Bibras Natcho
No.	Date	Venue	Opponent	Score	Result	Competition
1	7 September 2012	Tofiq Bahramov Republican Stadium, Baku, Azerbaijan	Azerbaijan	1–0	1–1	2014 FIFA World Cup qualification
2	9 September 2019	Stožice Stadium, Ljubljana, Slovenia	Slovenia	1–1	2–3	UEFA Euro 2020 qualifying
3	31 March 2021	Zimbru Stadium, Chișinău, Moldova	Moldova	4–1	4–1	2022 FIFA World Cup qualification
4	27 September 2022	National Stadium, Ta' Qali, Malta	Malta	1–0	1–2	Friendly

== Honours ==
Hapoel Tel Aviv

- Israel State Cup: 2006–07

Rubin Kazan

- Russian Cup: 2011–12
- Russian Super Cup: 2012

CSKA Moscow

- Russian Premier League: 2015–16

Individual

- UEFA Europa League Top assist provider: 2013–14
- UEFA Europa League Team of the Group Stage 2013–14
- Russian Premier League Central Midfielder of the Season: 2011–12, 2014–15
- Serbian SuperLiga Player of the Week: 2021–22 (Round 2), 2022–23 (Round 13), 2024–25 (Round 23)

Orders

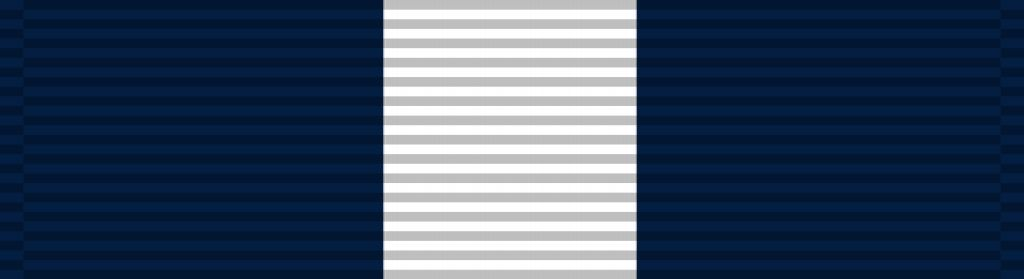
- President's Medal: 2023

== See also ==
- List of Israeli football players in foreign leagues
