= Abzakh dialect =

Adyghe dialect

Abzakh Adyghe dialect
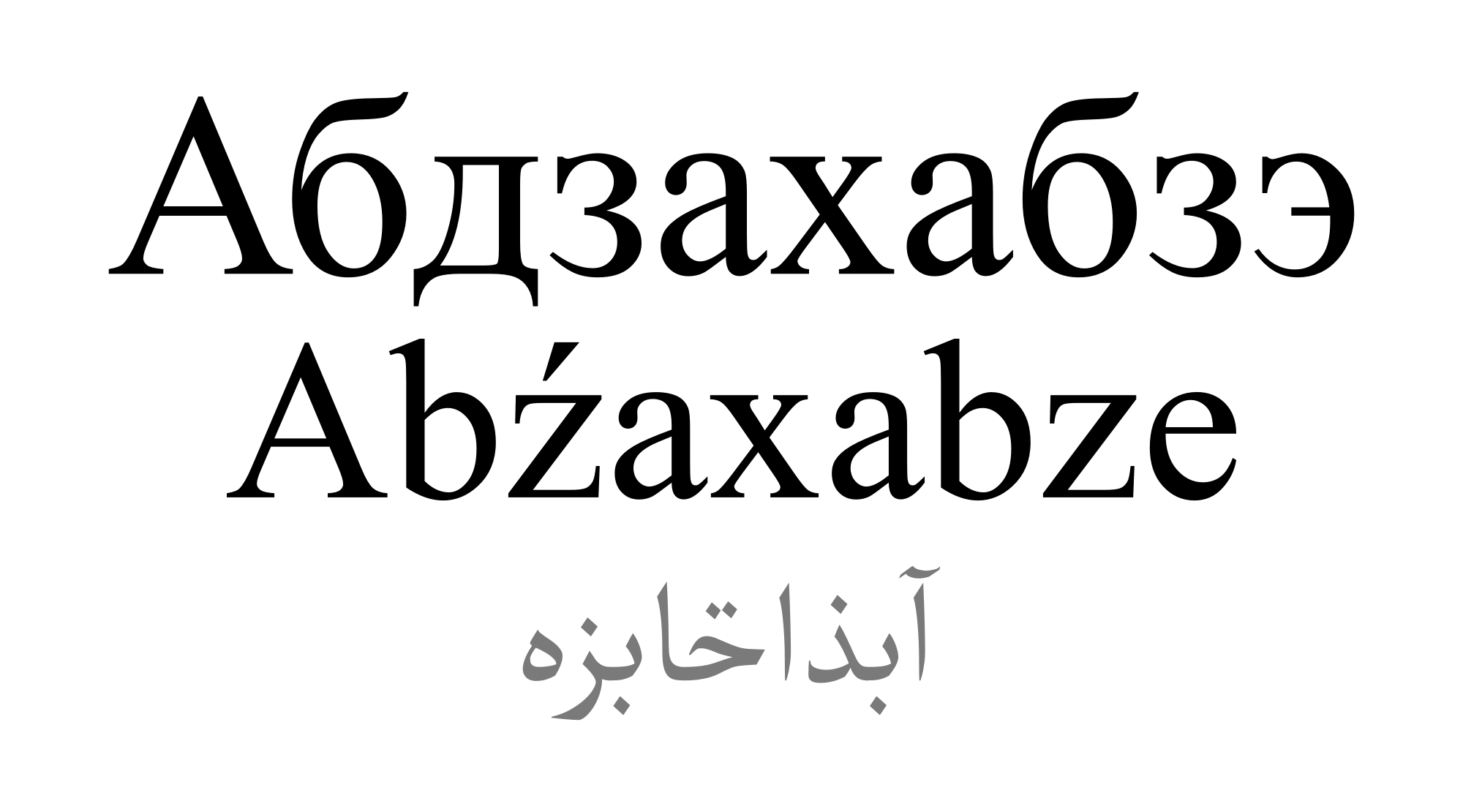
- "Abzakh dialect" written in the Cyrillic, the ABX Latin and the now-defunct Perso-Arabic scripts.
- Native to: Russia
- Ethnicity: Abzakhs
- Language family: Northwest Caucasian: Circassian; Adyghe; Kuban River; Abzakh Adyghe dialect

Language codes
- ISO 639-3: –
- Glottolog: abad1240

The Abzakh dialect (Adyghe: Абдзахабзэ; Kabardian: Абдзахэбзэ) is one of the Adyghe language dialects. The Abzakh dialect is spoken by the Abzakh which are one of the largest Circassian population in the diaspora outside Republic of Adygea alongside Shapsugs.

== Phonology ==
Historically, Proto-Circassian possessed a distinct series of stops and affricates. This inventory included palatalized velars and a contrast between retroflex and postalveolar affricates:

Postalveolar affricates:

- d͡ʒ ⟨дж⟩
- t͡ʃ ⟨ч⟩
- t͡ʃʼ ⟨чӀ⟩

Retroflex affricates:

- t͡ʂ ⟨чъ⟩
- t͡ʂʼ ⟨чӀъ⟩

Palatalized velars:

- ɡʲ ⟨гь⟩
- kʲ ⟨кь⟩
- kʲʼ ⟨кӀь⟩

The evolution from Proto-Circassian to Modern Abzakh is defined by two distinct chronological phases:

Phase 1 (Spirantization): The original affricates weakened into fricatives or glottal stops.
Phase 2 (Velar Palatalization): Historical palatalized velars shifted forward to fill the "gap" left by the changes in Phase 1.

The following sections detail how these shifts occurred and provide comparative examples.

=== Phase 1: Spirantization (Affricate to Fricative) ===
The first major shift occurred in the Abzakh and Kabardian dialects, where the original affricate postalveolar consonants and affricate retroflex consonants underwent spirantization, becoming fricatives.

One exception was that the original postalveolar ejective affricate [tʃʼ] ⟨чӀ⟩ did not just become a fricative; in Abzakh, it often debuccalized to a palatalized glottal stop ʔʲ ⟨Ӏь⟩ (or simply ⟨Ӏ⟩).

The shifts were:

- d͡ʒ ⟨дж⟩ → ʒ ⟨ж⟩
- t͡ʃ ⟨ч⟩ → ɕ ⟨щ⟩
- t͡ʂ ⟨чъ⟩ → ʂ ⟨шъ⟩
- t͡ʃʼ ⟨чӀ⟩ → ʔʲ ⟨Ӏь⟩ / ɕʼ ⟨щӀ⟩
- t͡ʂʼ ⟨чӀъ⟩ → ɕʼ ⟨щӀ⟩

The following table demonstrates specific examples of this spirantization in Abzakh:

Phase 1 Examples: Spirantization
Meaning	Proto-Circassian	Shift	Modern Abzakh
fox	⟨баджэ⟩ (with d͡ʒ)	d͡ʒ → ʒ	⟨бажэ⟩ (with ʒ)
village	⟨къуаджэ⟩ (with d͡ʒ)	d͡ʒ → ʒ	⟨къуажэ⟩ (with ʒ)
knee	⟨лъэгуанджэ⟩ (with d͡ʒ)	d͡ʒ → ʒ	⟨лъэгуанжэ⟩ (with ʒ)
village	⟨чылэ⟩ (with t͡ʃ)	t͡ʃ → ɕ	⟨щылэ⟩ (with ɕ)
night	⟨чэщы⟩ (with t͡ʃ)	t͡ʃ → ɕ	⟨щэщ⟩ (with ɕ)
cow	⟨чэмы⟩ (with t͡ʃ)	t͡ʃ → ɕ	⟨щэм⟩ (with ɕ)
to run	⟨чъэн⟩ (with t͡ʂ)	t͡ʂ → ʂ	⟨шъэн⟩ (with ʂ)
tree	⟨чъыгы⟩ (with t͡ʂ)	t͡ʂ → ʂ	⟨шъыг⟩ (with ʂ)
boy/young man	⟨чӀалэ⟩ (with t͡ʃʼ)	t͡ʃʼ → ʔʲ	⟨Ӏелэ⟩ (with ʔʲ)
to regret	⟨чӀэгъожьын⟩ (with t͡ʃʼ)	t͡ʃʼ → ʔʲ	⟨Ӏегъожьын⟩ (with ʔʲ)
new	⟨чӀэ⟩ (with t͡ʃʼ)	t͡ʃʼ → ɕʼ	⟨щӀэ⟩ (with ɕʼ)
summer	⟨чӀымафэ⟩ (with t͡ʃʼ)	t͡ʃʼ → ɕʼ	⟨щӀымафэ⟩ (with ɕʼ)
area	⟨чӀъыпӀэ⟩ (with t͡ʂʼ)	t͡ʂʼ → ɕʼ	⟨щӀыпӀэ⟩ (with ɕʼ)
ground	⟨чӀъыгу⟩ (with t͡ʂʼ)	t͡ʂʼ → ɕʼ	⟨щӀыгу⟩ (with ɕʼ)

The following table details the timeline of this evolution specifically within Abzakh, showing how words shifted from Proto-Circassian, to an intermediate Proto-Abzakh stage, and finally to Modern Abzakh.

Meaning	Proto-Circassian	Shift (Proto -> Abzakh)	Proto-Abzakh	Modern Abzakh
to come out from under	⟨чӀэкӀьын⟩ (contains t͡ʃʼ & kʲʼ)	t͡ʃʼ → ʔʲ	⟨ӀекӀьын⟩ (shift to ʔ)	⟨ӀечӀын⟩
to look from under	⟨къычӀэплъыкӀьын⟩ (contains t͡ʃʼ & kʲʼ)	t͡ʂʼ → ʔʲ	⟨къыӀеплъыкӀьын⟩ (shift to ʔ)	⟨къыӀеплъычӀын⟩
pretty cold	⟨чъыӀэ-кӀьай⟩ (contains t͡ʂ & kʲʼ)	t͡ʂ → ʂ	⟨шъыӀэ-кӀьай⟩ (shift to ʂ)	⟨шъыӀэ-чӀай⟩
fast	⟨чъыкӀьай⟩ (contains t͡ʂ & kʲʼ)	t͡ʂ → ʂ	⟨шъыкӀьай⟩ (shift to ʂ)	⟨шъычӀай⟩

=== Phase 2: Velar Palatalization ===
Later on, after the original affricates had become fricatives or glottal stops, a gap was left in the postalveolar position. In the majority of Circassian dialects (including standard Adyghe and Kabardian), the historical velar consonants shifted forward to fill this gap.

The velars ⟨гь⟩ [ɡʲ], ⟨кь⟩ [kʲ] and ⟨кӀь⟩ [kʲʼ] became the new palato-alveolar consonants ⟨дж⟩ [d͡ʒ], ⟨ч⟩ [t͡ʃ] and ⟨кӀ⟩ [t͡ʃʼ] respectively.

The following table demonstrates how these words are distinct in archaic dialects (like Shapsug) but have merged or shifted in Standard Adyghe and Kabardian.

Phase 2 Examples: Velar Palatalization
Meaning	Proto-Circassian	Shift (Proto -> Modern)	Standard Adyghe/Kabardian/Modern Abzakh
rope	⟨кӀьапсэ⟩ (with kʲʼ)	kʲʼ → t͡ʃʼ	⟨чӀапсэ⟩ (with t͡ʃʼ)
short	⟨кӀьакуэ⟩ (with kʲʼ)	kʲʼ → t͡ʃʼ	⟨чӀакуэ⟩ (with t͡ʃʼ)
tail	⟨кӀьэ⟩ (with kʲʼ)	kʲʼ → t͡ʃʼ	⟨чӀэ⟩ (with t͡ʃʼ)

=== Phonological Shifts ===
The Voiceless velar fricative [x] becomes the aspirated Voiceless velar plosive [kʰ] (like English c in car, cup, cop, or curse) after the voiceless postalveolar fricative [ʃ]. In this environment, the velar fricative undergoes hardening to become a plosive. This change only occurred in some Abzakh sub-dialects and in Bzhedug dialects. This should not be confused with the palatalized kʲ (like English c in camera, cannon, or cow).

Word	Shift	Adyghe				Kabardian	
Word	Shift	Abzakh / Bzhedug		Standard		Kabardian	
Word	Shift	IPA	Cyrillic	IPA	Cyrillic	IPA	Cyrillic
Rain	ʃx → ʃkʰ	waʃkʰ	ошк	waʃx	ошх	waʃx	уэшх
Rifle	ʃxʷ → ʃkʷ	ʃkʷant͡ʃʼ	шконч	ʃxʷant͡ʃʼ	шхонч	-	-
to eat	ʃx → ʃkʰ	ʃkʰan	шкэн	ʃxan	шхэн	ʃxan	шхэн
to laugh at	ʃx → ʃkʰ	daħa:ʃkʰən	дэхьащкын	daħa:ʃxən	дэхьащхын	daħa:ʃxən	дэхьащхын
enormous	ʃx → ʃkʷ	jənəʃkʷ	инышку	jənəʃxu	инышху	jənəʃxuə	инышхуэ
Almighty God	ʃx → ʃkʷ	tħa:ʃkʷ	тхьашку	tħa:ʃxu	тхьашху	tħəʃxuə	тхьэшхуэ
large room/house	ʃx → ʃkʷ	wənaʃkʷ	унэшку	wənaʃxu	унэшху	wənaʃxuə	унэшхуэ
festival	ʃx → ʃkʷ	mafaʃkʷ	мэфэшку	mafaʃxu	мэфэшху	ma:xʷaʃxuə	мэхуэшхуэ

== Unique words ==
Word	Adyghe				Standard Kabardian	
Word	Standard Adyghe		Abzakh		Standard Kabardian	
Word	IPA	Cyrillic	IPA	Cyrillic	IPA	Cyrillic
what	səd	сыд	səd / sə	сыд / сы	сыт	сыт
why	sədaː	сыда	ħaː	хьа	sət ɕħat͡ʃʼa	сыт щхьэкӀэ
he/she/it/that/this	aɕ moɕ məɕ	ащ мощ мыщ	aj moj məj	ай мой мый	aːbə mobə məbə	абы мобы мыбы
like that/this	aɕfad məʃfad	ащфэд мыщдэд	ajfad məjfad	айфэд мыйфэд	aːpxʷad məpxʷad	апхуэд мыпхуэд
near	daʑ	дэжь	daj	дэй	dajʒ	деж
self	jaʑ	ежь	jaj	ей	jazə	езы
burn	stən	стын	sən	сын	сын	сын

== Grammar differences ==
=== Instrumental case ===
In the Khakurinokhabl sub-dialect of Abzakh, the instrumental case has the suffix -мӀе (-mʔʲa) or -Ӏе (-ʔʲa) unlike other dialects that has the suffix -мкӀэ (-mt͡ʃa) or -кӀэ (-t͡ʃa).

- Khakurinokhabl : Ӏялэр АдыгэбзэӀе мэгущаӀэ ↔ Standard: КӀалэр АдыгэбзэкӀэ мэгущаӀэ – "The boy speaks (using) Adyghe language".
- Khakurinokhabl : КъэлэмымӀе сэтхэ ↔ Standard: КъэлэмымкӀэ сэтхэ – "I write (using) with the pencil".

=== Backward Prefix ===
In the Standard Adyghe, The prefix зэкӀэ- means backward. In the Abzakh dialect, it is зэӀе-.

- Abzakh : Ӏялэр зэӀекӀо ↔ Standard: КӀалэр зэкӀэкӀо – "The boy walks backward".
- Abzakh : Ӏялэр зэӀеплъэ ↔ Standard: КӀалэр зэкӀаплъэ – "The boy looks backward".

=== Under Prefix ===
In the Standard Adyghe, The prefix чӀэ- means under (toward under). In the Abzakh dialect, it is Ӏе-.

- Abzakh : Шъыгым Ӏес Ӏялэр ↔ Standard: Чъыгым чӀэс кӀалэр – "The boy sits under the tree".
- Abzakh : Ӏанэм ыщӀэгъ Ӏеплъ ↔ Standard: Ӏанэм ычӀэгъ чӀаплъ – "Look under the table".
- Abzakh : ЛӀыр тучаным Ӏехьэ ↔ Standard: ЛӀыр тучаным чӀахьэ – "The man enters the shop".

== Sample text ==
НАРТ САУСЫРЫКЪОРЭ ИНЫЖЪЫМРЭ:

Саусырыкъо ахэмытэу нартхэр былымыхьэ кӀогъагъэх. Былымхэр къагъоти, къежьэжьыхи Къойданэм къэсыгъэх. Саусырыкъо дэмысыгъэу щытыти, къыхэкӀижьи, янэ дэжь къихьажьыгъ.

— Сыгъашх, тян, — ыӀуагъ Саусырыкъо. — Сыгъашх, сыгъашх оӀо зэпыты, ущыс, модыкӀэ нартыхэр былым къахьи, Къойданым къэсыжьыгъэх, — къыриӀуагъ янэ.

Нартымэ сырямыгъусагъэми, ащ къахьырэмэ анахьышӀуӀомкӀэ садэгощэн, тян, — ыӀуагъ.

ПӀэстэ шыӀэ щтыгъ, лы жъогъэ щтыгъ, щыбжьый-шыгъу атетэкъуагъэу Ӏанэм къытыригъэуцуагъэх янэ. Саусырыкъо пӀастэр ыфызи, псыр къыӀифыгъ, лыр ыутхыпкӀи мылыхэр къыпигъэтэкъуи ышхыгъ.

— Ныбжьи нахь дэгъоу сыбгъэшхагъэп, тян, — ыӀуи къикӀижьыгъ.

Саусырыкъо Тхъожъыем къытетӀысхьи, Къойданым кӀонэу ежьагъ. Саусырыкъо къакӀоу нартхэм залъэгъум, шӀэныгъэ иӀэу зы лӀы горэ ахэтыти: «Саусырыкъо мыгъо цӀыкӀур къэкӀозы, «фэсыжь апщи, нартхэ», зиӀокӀэ «тхьэуегъэпсэу» — шъуӀо нахь, «ахад» — шъумыӀо», — къариӀуагъ.

ЗэриӀуагъэм фэдэу, тыдэкӀэ ахэхьагъэми «тхьэуегъэпсэу» къыраӀуагъ нахь, «ахад» къыраӀуагъзп.

ЕтӀанэ, Саусырыкъо губжъи, ежь зыфиӀорэр къыдэхъоу щытыти, щэщищ гъурӀи зишӀи шыӀэм зэтыригъэлӀагъэх.

— МэшӀо тӀэкӀу тэзгъэгъотырэр Ӏэхьэгъу тшӀыщт зы ӀахьэкӀэ. — аӀуагъ нартымэ.

— Сз шъозгъэгъотыщт, — ариӀуи, тау-таш горэм Ӏугъо тӀэкӀу къыдихэу ылъэгъугъэти, Саусырыкъо ащ кӀуагъэ.

Лэгъупышхом лы илъэу, пхъэцэӀитӀу, зы инырэ, зы цӀыкӀурэ пэлъэу, иныжъыри ащ къещэкӀигъэу пэӀулъэу къыӀухьагъ.

МашӀом икъыпэхыкӀэу хъущтыр Саусырыкъо ымышӀэу егупшысэу щытызэ, Тхъожъыер къэгущыӀи: «УишыӀядзэ къыӀехи, упкӀэ цуакъэ сфэшӀ. Бажьэм фэдэу зызгъэзэщт, цызэм фэдэу сыкъэкӀощт, лъэгонжэмышъхьэкӀэ зесыдзыхынызы, пхъэцакӀэ иным уемыӀэу, цӀыкӀур къашти, тхьыны тыкӀожьыщт, — къыриӀуагъ.

ИшыӀядзэ къыӀихи, упкӀэ цуакъэ фишӀыгь. КъекӀуалӀи, Тхъожъыем лъэгонжэмышхьэкӀэ зыридзыхыгъ. Саусырыкъо пхъэцэкӀэ цӀыкӀум еӀэ шӀошӀызэ, иным еӀи, иныжъым тыригъафи, къыгъэущыгъ. КъэӀаби, Саусырыкъо рилъэшъохи шыр шъхьартӀупщэу хъугъэ, Саусырыкъуи иныжъым ипӀэшъхьагъ Ӏилъхьагъ.

— Сыд уилъэгъунэу укъызыфэкӀуагъэр? — ыӀуи иныжъыр къеупщӀыгъ.

— ШыӀэ тылӀэти мэшӀо тӀзкӀу схьынэу сыкъэкӀуагъ, — ыӀуагъ Саусырыкъо.

— Тыдэ укъикӀирэ?

— Нарты сыкъекӀи, — риӀуагъ.

— Саусырыкъо ихьэгьо-шӀагъохэмэ ашышэу зы къаумэ къысаӀуи, устӀупщыжьыщт, — ыӀуагъ иныжъым.

— Саусырыкъо ихьэгъо-шӀагъомэ ащышэу сэ зэхэсхыгъзу зы къаумэ къыосӀон, ау сэ ежь слъэгъугьахэп, — ыӀуагъ. — Саусырыкъо жьан щэрэхъыр къушъхьэм дарегъэхьые, къырарегъэфыхи, копкъышъхьэкӀэ еозы дефыежьы.

Саусырыкъо дихьыен ылъэкӀыщтэпти, ежь иныжъым жьан щэрэхъыр къушъхьэм дихьий, Саусырыкъо къырыригьэшэхыгъ. Иныр копкъышъхьэӀе къеуи, къыдифыежьыгъ.

— Ащ пэмыӀеу пшӀзрэ щыӀэмэ, къаӀо, — ыӀуагъ иным.

— Цобзэ-шӀобзыр плъыжьыбзэу егъэплъызы, ыжэ кӀоцӀ делъхьазы егъэкӀуасэ аӀоу зэхэсхыгъэ, — риӀуагь.

Иныжъым цобзэ-шӀобзыр плъыжьыбзэу ыгъэплъи, ыжэ дилъхьи, ыгъэкӀосагъ.

— СӀукӀоцӀ хъутэ-плъытэщти, ыгъэусэни, сигъэтхъэжьыгъ. Ай нэмыӀеу сы пшӀэрэ? — ыӀуи къеупщӀыгъ.

— Ай нэмыӀеу, псыр егъажъо, псы жъуагъэм хэгьуалъхьэзы зегъэпскӀы.

Иныжъым гъоплъэ хьэкъуашъокӀэ псыр къыгъажъуи, машӀор ӀешӀыхьагъэу хэгъуалъхьи зигъэпскӀыгъ.

— Шъохъу-тӀэхъум сигъалӀэщтыгъ, сыдэу Ӏэзэгъу шӀагъо къысэпӀуагъ, сиӀял, — къыриӀуагъ. — Джыри сыд ышӀэу зэхэпхыгъэр?

— Ай нэмыӀеу, ыхыкъын къэсэу псым зыхигьэщтыхьати, щэщ-мэфищэ хэтыщтыгъэ, етӀанэ къыкъутэти къыхэкӀижьыщтыгъ, — аӀоу зэхэсхыгъэ.

— Адэ ар таущытэу ыгъэщтытыгъэ, сыд ышӀэщтыгъэр? — ыӀуи иныжъыр къеупщӀыгъ.

— СшӀэрэп, зыгорэ еӀошъы псыр егъэщты аӀоу зэхэсхыгъэ, — ыӀуагъ Саусырыкъо.

— Адэ къэшӀи, мэхъумэ тегъэплъ.

— Псым хэуцу, — ыӀуи ытыкъыны къэсэу псым хигъэуцуагъ.

Ежь Саусырыкъо ышӀэу щытыти, щэщищым къэхъущт щтырыгъуӀир къышӀи, иныжъыр хигъэщтыхьагъ.

— КъеӀ, — ыӀуи къызеӀэм, мылыр къыгъэцӀацӀэу, къыгъачэу хъугъэ.

— Зэ зыгъэбыяу, щыгъупшагъэ сшӀыгъэ, — ыӀуагъ Саусырыкъо. — Саусырыкъо мылыр къыхичыти, псы къытыригъэлъадэщтыгъ, хьауарзэ хитакъоти, ыгъзщтыжьыти, къытыригъэсэжьыщтыгъэ.

Ащ фэдэу ышӀи: — КъеӀ, нныжъ, —зыреӀом, къьыкӀаӀи шъхьзкӀэ мылыр къыфэгъэхъыягъэп.

== See also ==
- Hakuchi Adyghe dialect
- Hatuqay dialect
- Bzhedug Adyghe Dialect
- Shapsug Adyghe dialect
- Baslaney dialect

== Source ==
- Kumakhova, Zara Yusufovna (1972). Абадзехский диалект и его место среди других адыгских диалектов [The Abadzakh Dialect and Its Place Among Other Adyghe Dialects] (in Russian). Nalchik: Elbrus.
