= Hatuqay dialect =

Dialect of Adyghe

Hatuqay Adyghe dialect
- Хьатыкъой, Хьатыкъуай; Хьатыкъойыбзэ, Хьатыкъуайыбзэ
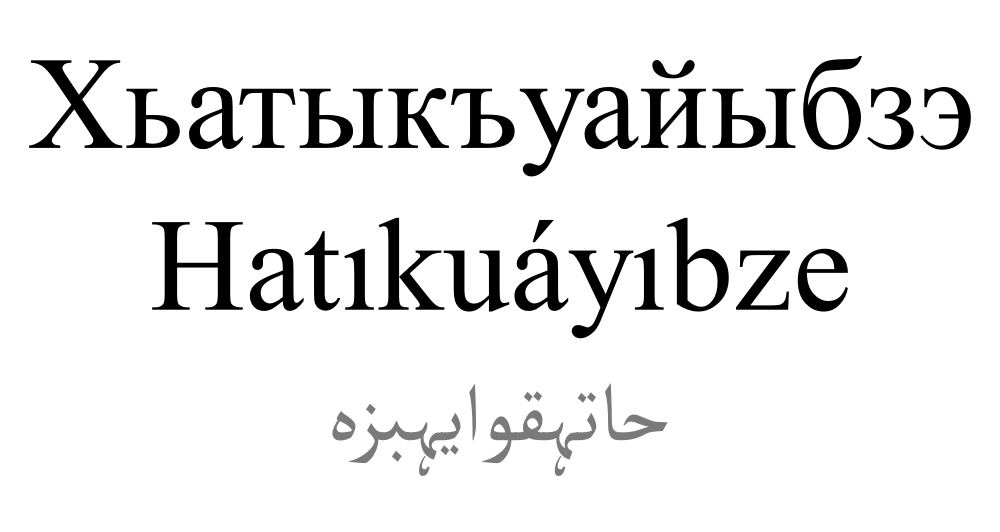
- "Hatuqay dialect" written in the Cyrillic, the ABX Latin and the now-defunct Perso-Arabic scripts.
- Native to: Circassia (modern-day Russia)
- Region: Turkey
- Ethnicity: Circassians: Hatuqays
- Language family: Northwest Caucasian: Circassian; Adyghe; Steppe Dialects; Hatuqay Adyghe dialect

Official status
- Official language in: Hatuqay Principality (Historically)

Language codes
- ISO 639-3: –

The Hatuqay dialect (Note: Spelled variously as Hatukay, Hatıkuay, Hatkoy, Hatuqway, Hadugoy, Hadgoy, Khatukay, etc; Adyghe: Хьатыкъой(ыбзэ), Хьатыкъуай(ыбзэ)) is a dialect of Adyghe, spoken by the Hatuqay branch of the Circassian people. Linguistically, it is classified as one of the Steppe or Kuban river dialects, a subgroup of that also includes the Chemguy, Abzakh and Bzhedug dialects, although it also shares many grammatical and phonological features with the coastal dialect of Shapsug. Although certainly a dialect of West Circassian (Adyghe), it is considered the closest among the Western dialects to East Circassian (Kabardian).

Hatuqay was historically spoken in Circassia, in the Hatuqay Principality. As a result of the Circassian genocide, there are no remaining speakers of the Hatuqay dialect in the Caucasus region; thus Hatuqay is spoken only in the diaspora, in Turkey. Consequently, Circassian dialectology studies rarely mention or analyze Hatuqay.

== Phonology ==
=== Sounds ===
А а [aː]	Б б [b]	В в [v]	Г г [ɣ] or [ɡ]	Гу гу [ɡʷ]	Гъ гъ [ʁ]	Гъу гъу [ʁʷ]	Д д [d]
Дж дж [d͡ʒ]	Дз дз [d͡z]	Дзу дзу [d͡zʷ]	Е е [ja/aj]	Ё ё [jo]	Ж ж [ʒ]	Жъ жъ [ʐ]	Жъу жъу [ʐʷ]
Жь жь [ʑ]	З з [z]	И и [jə/əj]	Й й [j]	К к [k]	Кʰ кʰ [kʰ]	Ку ку [kʷ]	Къ къ [q]
Къʰ къʰ [qʰ]	Къу къу [qʷ]	Кхъ кхъ [qχ]	КӀ кӀ [t͡ʃʼ/kʼ]	КӀу кӀу [kʷʼ]	Л л [ɮ] or [l]	Лъ лъ [ɬ]	ЛӀ лӀ [ɬʼ]
М м [m]	Н н [n]	О о [aw/wa]	П п [p]	Пʰ пʰ [pʰ]	ПӀ пӀ [pʼ]	ПӀу пӀу [pʷʼ]	Р р [r]
С с [s]	СӀ сӀ [sʼ] (Archaic)	Т т (Т: т:) [t]	Тʰ тʰ [tʰ]	ТӀ тӀ [tʼ]	ТӀу тӀу [tʷʼ]	У у [w/əw]	Ф ф [f]
Х х [x]	Хъ хъ [χ]	Хъу хъу [χʷ]	Хь хь [ħ]	ХӀ хӀ [h]	Ц ц [t͡s]	Цʰ цʰ [t͡sʰ]	ЦӀ цӀ [t͡sʼ]
Ч ч [t͡ʃ]	Чʰ чʰ [t͡ʃʰ]	ЧI чI [t͡ʂʼ]	Чъ чъ [t͡ʂ]	Чъʰ чъʰ [t͡ʂʰ]	Чъу чъу [t͡ʃʷ]	Ш ш [ʃ]	Шʰ шʰ [ʃʰ]
Шъ шъ [ʂ]	Шъу шъу [ʂʷ] or [ɕʷ]	ШӀ шӀ [ʃʼ]	ШӀу шӀу [ʃʷʼ]	Щ щ [ɕ]	Ъ ъ [ˠ]	Ы ы [ə]	Ь ь [ʲ]
Э э [a]	Ю ю [ju]	Я я [jaː]	Ӏ [ʔ]	Ӏу [ʔʷ]			

=== Sound shifts ===
Proto-Circassian is reconstructed as having a four-way laryngeal contrast in its stop series: voiced, voiceless unaspirated, voiceless aspirated, and ejective. While most modern Circassian varieties have neutralized the distinction between voiceless unaspirated and voiceless aspirated stops, the Hatuqay dialect generally maintains the original four-way contrast. Hatuqay occupies a "middle ground" compared to other dialects: while Shapsug and Chemguy preserve a three-way posterior coronal contrast, and Besleney and Turkish Kabardian neutralize them to a single place, Hatuqay possesses two coronal places of articulation posterior to /s/. The specific realization of these two places varies by speaker, manifesting as contrasts such as /ʃ/ vs. /ɕ/, /ʃ/ vs. /ʂ/, or /ɕ/ vs. /ʂ/.

Standart цу ([tsʷ]) becomes чъу ([tɕʷ]) in Hatuqay:

English	Adyghe (West Circassian)		Kabardian (East Circassian)
English	Literary Standard (West)	Hatuqay	Literary Standard (East)
Shoe	цуакъэ	чъуакъэ	вакъэ
Ox	цу	чъу	вы

The Hatuqay dialect displays specific sound shifts compared to the literary standard:

English	Adyghe (West Circassian)		Kabardian (East Circassian)
English	Hatuqay	Literary Standard (West)	Literary Standard (East)
Word	гущаIэ	гущыIэ	псалъэ
Where	тэдэ	тыдэ	дэнэ
Swing	хъаерэн	хъэрен	хъыринэ
Small	жъий / жъый	жъый	жьей
Young brother (Used in slang to address a young man)	чынахьыкӀ	шынахьыкӀ	-

Hatuqay is known for vowel insertions in names:

Name	Standard Pronunciation	Hatuqay Pronunciation
Nasran (A Nart hero)	Нэсрэн	Нэсырэн
Ibrahim (Abraham)	Ибрахьим	Ибырахьим

=== Aspirated consonants ===
The aspirated consonants originally existed in the Proto-Circassian language, which maintained a strict distinction between aspirated and tense variants of voiceless consonants. While these sounds were lost or shifted in most modern dialects, they successfully survived in the Shapsug, Bzhedug, and Hatuqay dialects.

In these dialects, there exists a series of aspirated consonants (/pʰ/ /tʰ/ /ʃʰ/ /t͡sʰ/ /t͡ʃʰ/ /t͡ʂʰ/ /t͡ɕʷʰ/ /kʲʰ/ /kʷʰ/ /qʰ/ /qʷʰ/) that became plain consonants in other dialects:

- Shapsug, Bzhedug & Hatuqay пʰ [pʰ] ↔ п [p] in other dialects :

Word	Adyghe (West Circassian)		Kabardian (East Circassian)
Word	Shapsug, Bzhedug & Hatuqay	Chemguy & Literary Standard and Abzakh	Kabardian (East Circassian)
sharp	пʰапцӏэ [pʰaːpt͡sʼa]	папцӏэ [paːpt͡sʼa]	папцӏэ [paːpsʼa / paːpt͡sʼa]
arrogant	пʰагэ [pʰaːɣa]	пагэ [paːɣa]	пагэ [paːɣa]
nose	пʰэ [pʰa]	пэ [pa]	пэ [pa]

- Shapsug, Bzhedug & Hatuqay тʰ [tʰ] ↔ т [t] in other dialects :

Word	Adyghe (West Circassian)		Kabardian (East Circassian)
Word	Shapsug, Bzhedug & Hatuqay	Chemguy & Literary Standard and Abzakh	Kabardian (East Circassian)
respect	пхъатʰэ [pχaːtʰa]	пхъатэ [pχaːta]	-
to give	етʰын [jatʰən]	етын [jatən]	етын [jatən]
to take	штʰэн [ʃtʰan]	штэн [ʃtan]	щтэн [ɕtan]
on	тʰет [tʰajt]	тет [tajt]	тет [tat]
smooth	цӏашъутʰэ [t͡sʼaːʂʷtʰa]	цӏашъутэ [t͡sʼaːʃʷta]	цӏафтэ [t͡sʼaːfta]
to afraid	щтʰэн [ɕtʰan]	щтэн [ɕtan]	щтэн [ɕtan]
pillow	шъхьантʰэ [ʂħaːntʰa]	шъхьантэ [ʂħaːnta]	щхьатэ [ɕħaːta]

- Shapsug, Bzhedug & Hatuqay цʰ [t͡sʰ] ↔ ц [t͡s] in other dialects :

Word	Adyghe (West Circassian)		Kabardian (East Circassian)
Word	Shapsug, Bzhedug & Hatuqay	Chemguy & Literary Standard and Abzakh	Kabardian (East Circassian)
wool	цʰы [t͡sʰə]	цы [t͡sə]	цы [t͡sə]
eyelash	нэбзыцʰ [nabzət͡sʰ]	нэбзыц [nabzət͡s]	-

- Shapsug, Bzhedug & Hatuqay шʰ [ʃʰ] ↔ щ [ɕ] in other Adyghe dialects :

Word	Adyghe (West Circassian)		Kabardian (East Circassian)
Word	Shapsug, Bzhedug & Hatuqay	Chemguy & Literary Standard and Abzakh	Kabardian (East Circassian)
milk	шʰэ [ʃʰa]	щэ [ɕa]	шэ [ʃa]
lame	лъашʰэ [ɬaːʃʰa]	лъащэ [ɬaːɕa]	лъашэ [ɬaːʃa]
salt	шʰыгъу [ʃʰəʁʷ]	щыгъу [ɕəʁʷ]	шыгъу [ʃəʁʷ]
cloud	пшʰэ [pʃʰa]	пщэ [pɕa]	пшэ [pʃa]
pus	шʰыны [ʃʰənə]	щыны [ɕənə]	шын [ʃən]
accordion	пшʰынэ [pʃʰəna]	пщынэ [pɕəna]	пшынэ [pʃəna]
fat	пшʰэры [pʃʰarə]	пщэры [pɕarə]	пшэр [pʃar]
wax	шʰэфы [ʃʰafə]	шэфы [ʃafə]	шэху [ʃaxʷə]
horse	шʰы [ʃʰə]	шы [ʃə]	шы [ʃə]
sand	пшʰахъо [pʃʰaːχʷa]	пшахъо [pʃaːχʷa]	пшахъуэ [pʃaːχʷa]
story	пшʰысэ [pʃʰəsa]	пшысэ [pʃəsa]	пшысэ [pʃəsa]

- Shapsug кьʰ [kʲʰ] ↔ ч [t͡ʃ] in other dialects (чʰ [t͡ʃʰ] in Bzhedug & Hatuqay) :

Word	Adyghe (West Circassian)			Kabardian (East Circassian)
Word	Shapsug	Bzhedug & Hatuqay	Chemguy & Literary Standard and Abzakh	Kabardian (East Circassian)
spleen	кьʰэ [kʲʰa]	чʰэ [t͡ʃʰa]	чэ [t͡ʃa]	чэ [t͡ʃa]
brushwood twig	кьʰы [kʲʰə]	чʰы [t͡ʃʰə]	чы [t͡ʃə]	чы [t͡ʃə]
to cough	пскьʰэн [pskʲʰan]	псчʰэн [pst͡ʃʰan]	псчэн [pst͡ʃan]	псчэн [pst͡ʃan]

- Shapsug, Bzhedug & Hatuqay кʰу [kʷʰ] ↔ ку [kʷ] in other dialects :

Word	Adyghe (West Circassian)		Kabardian (East Circassian)
Word	Shapsug, Bzhedug & Hatuqay	Chemguy & Literary Standard and Abzakh	Kabardian (East Circassian)
middle	кʰу [kʷʰə]	ку [kʷə]	ку [kʷə]
thigh	кʰо [kʷʰa]	ко [kʷa]	куэ [kʷa]

- Shapsug, Bzhedug & Hatuqay къʰ [qʰ] ↔ къ [q] in other Adyghe dialects. Note: In many Shapsug dialects (such as Kfar Kama), this became the fricative хъ [χ], while in Natukhai and Hatuqay it became the affricate кхъ [q͡χ].

Word	Adyghe (West Circassian)				Kabardian (East Circassian)
Word	Shapsug & Bzhedug	Other Shapsug dialects (like Kfar Kama)	Natukhaj & Hatuqay	Chemguy & Literary Standard and Abzakh	Kabardian (East Circassian)
grave	къʰэ [qʰa]	хъэ [χa]	кхъэ [q͡χa]	къэ [qa]	кхъэ [q͡χa]

- Shapsug, Bzhedug & Hatuqay къуʰ [qʷʰ] ↔ къу [qʷ] in other Adyghe dialects. Note: In Shapsug dialects, this became хъу [χʷ], while in Natukhai and Hatuqay it became кхъу [q͡χʷ].

Word	Adyghe (West Circassian)				Kabardian (East Circassian)
Word	Shapsug & Bzhedug	Other Shapsug dialects (like Kfar Kama)	Natukhaj & Hatuqay	Chemguy & Literary Standard and Abzakh	Kabardian (East Circassian)
pig	къʰо [qʷʰa]	хъо [χʷa]	кхъо [q͡χʷa]	къо [qʷa]	кхъуэ [q͡χʷa]
cheese	къʰуае [qʷʰaːja]	хъуае [χʷaːja]	кхъуае [q͡χʷaːja]	къуае [qʷaːja]	кхъуей [q͡χʷaj]
ship	къʰохь [qʷʰaħ]	хъохь [χʷaħ]	-	къухьэ [qʷəħa]	кхъухь [q͡χʷəħ]
to fart	къэкъʰун [qaqʷʰəʃʷən]	къэхъушъун [qʷaχʷəʃʷən]	-	къэкъушъун [qʷaqʷəʃʷən]	къэцыфын [qat͡səfən]
peer	къʰужъы [qʷʰəʐə]	къужъы [qʷəʐə]	-	къужъы [qʷəʐə]	кхъужьы [q͡χʷəʑə]

- Shapsug, Bzhedug & Hatuqay чъʰу [t͡ɕʷʰ] ↔ чу [t͡ʃʷ] (spelled цу) in Temirgoy:

Word	Adyghe (West Circassian)		Kabardian (East Circassian)
Word	Shapsug, Bzhedug & Hatuqay	Chemguy & Literary Standard	Kabardian (East Circassian)
jungle/bushy area	чъʰуны [t͡ɕʷʰənə]	цуны [t͡ʃʷənə]	фын [fən]

In Proto-Circassian, there was a clear distinction between aspirated and tense variants of voiceless consonants. The tense variants survived in western dialects like Shapsug, Hatuqay, Bzhedug, and Chemguy (Temirgoy). In linguistics literature, these tense consonants are often represented with a colon (e.g., tː) to denote gemination/tenseness, and in some Cyrillic orthographies, they are represented with double letters (e.g., пп, тт, цц) or with a colon (e.g., п:, т:, ц:).

In the eastern dialects (Besleney and Kabardian), the tense variants shifted and became voiced.

- pː ⟨п: / пп⟩ → b ⟨б⟩
- tː ⟨т: / тт⟩ → d ⟨д⟩
- t͡sː ⟨ц: / цц⟩ → d͡z ⟨дз⟩
- t͡ɕːʷ ⟨цу: / цуцу⟩ → v ⟨в⟩
- kːʲ ⟨кь: / кькь⟩ → ɡʲ ⟨гь⟩ / d͡ʒ ⟨дж⟩
- kːʷ ⟨ку: / куку⟩ → ɡʷ ⟨гу⟩
- t͡ʃː ⟨ч: / чч⟩ → d͡ʒ ⟨дж⟩ / ʒ ⟨ж⟩
- t͡ʂː ⟨чъ: / чъчъ⟩ → d͡ʐ ⟨джъ⟩ / ʒ ⟨ж⟩

Word	Proto-Circassian	Adyghe (West Circassian)		Kabardian (East Circassian)	
Word	Proto-Circassian	Shapsug	Bzhedug, Hatuqay, Chemguy & Literary Standard	Besleney	Standard Kabardian
Shift: tː → d
we	т:э [tːa]	т:э [tːa]	т:э [tːa]	дэ [da]	дэ [da]
leader	тхьэмат:э [tħamaːtːa]	тхьэмат:э [tħamaːtːa]	тхьэмат:э [tħamaːtːa]	тхьэмадэ [tħamaːda]	тхьэмадэ [tħamaːda]
Shift: t͡sː → d͡z
fish	пц:эжъые [pt͡sːaʐəja]	пц:эжъые [pt͡sːaʐəja]	пц:эжъые [pt͡sːaʐəja]	бдзэжьей [bd͡zaʑej]	бдзэжьей [bd͡zaʑej]
mouse	ц:ыгъо [t͡sːəʁʷa]	ц:ыгъо [t͡sːəʁʷa]	ц:ыгъо [t͡sːəʁʷa]	дзыгъуэ [d͡zəʁʷa]	дзыгъуэ [d͡zəʁʷa]
Shift: kːʲ → ɡʲ / d͡ʒ
glass	апкь: [aːpkːʲ]	апкь: [aːpkːʲ]	апч: [aːpt͡ʃː]	абгь [ʔaːbɡʲ]	абдж [ʔaːbd͡ʒ]
chicken	кь:эт [kːʲat]	кь:эт [kːʲat]	ч:эты [t͡ʃːatə]	гьэд [ɡʲad]	джэд [d͡ʒad]
Shift: t͡ʃː → d͡ʒ / ʒ
night	ч:эщ [t͡ʃːaɕ]	ч:эщы [t͡ʃːaɕə]	ч:эщы [t͡ʃːaɕə]	джэщ [d͡ʒaɕ]	жэщ [ʒaɕ]
village	ч:ылэ [t͡ʃːəɮa]	ч:ылэ [t͡ʃːəɮa]	ч:ылэ [t͡ʃːəɮa]	джылэ [d͡ʒəɮa]	жылэ [ʒəɮa]
cow	ч:эм [t͡ʃːam]	ч:эмы [t͡ʃːamə]	ч:эмы [t͡ʃːamə]	джэм [d͡ʒam]	жэм [ʒam]
Shift: t͡ʂː → d͡ʐ / ʒ
tree	чъ:ыг [t͡ʂːəɣ]	чъ:ыгы [t͡ʂːəɣə]	чъ:ыгы [t͡ʂːəɣə]	джъыг [d͡ʐəɣ]	жыг [ʒəɣ]
Shift: kːʷ → ɡʷ
short	кӏьак:о [kʲʼaːkːʷa]	кӏьак:о [kʲʼaːkːʷa]	кӏак:о [t͡ʃʼaːkːʷa]	кӏьагуэ [kʲʼaːɡʷa]	кӏагуэ [t͡ʃʼaːɡʷa]
wheat	к:оц [kːʷat͡s]	к:оцы [kːʷat͡sə]	к:оцы [kːʷat͡sə]	гуэдз [ɡʷad͡z]	гуэдз [ɡʷad͡z]

=== Affrication of Fricatives ===
In the Bzhedugh, Hatuqay and Shapsug dialects, a specific consonant hardening process known as affrication occurs. During this process, softer "sh" sounds (palato-alveolar fricatives) harden into "ch" sounds (affricates) whenever they directly follow the sibilant consonants ⟨с⟩ [s] or ⟨шъу⟩ [ʃʷ].

To understand this, it helps to think of a similar unwritten sound change in English involving the letters dr and tr. Even though it isn't spelled this way, drink, drop, and dragon are naturally pronounced with a "j-r" sound instead of a hard "d-r". Similarly, tree, true, and trust are pronounced with a "ch-r" sound instead of a "t-r". In these Adyghe dialects, the combination of these specific consonants naturally hardens in speech in the exact same way.

Importantly, this sound change is not written, but is pronounced. Standard Adyghe spelling keeps the original letters, but speakers of these dialects will automatically pronounce the hardened versions.

Specifically, the following base letter changes take place:

- ⟨ш⟩ and ⟨щ⟩ harden into ⟨ч⟩.
- ⟨шъ⟩ hardens into ⟨чъ⟩.
- ⟨шӏ⟩ hardens into ⟨чӏ⟩.
- ⟨шъу⟩ hardens into ⟨чъу⟩.
- ⟨шӏу⟩ hardens into ⟨чӏу⟩.

Pronunciation Rules In grammar, this process is almost exclusively triggered when attaching the first-person singular prefix с- (I/me) or the second-person plural prefix шъу- (you all) to a word.

Here are all the possible combinations where this sound change occurs:

Affrication Combinations
Trigger	Base Consonant	Cyrillic Change	IPA Transformation
с- (I)	ш	сш → сч	[sʃ] → [st͡ʃ]
с- (I)	щ	сщ → сч	[sɕ] → [st͡ʃ]
с- (I)	шъ	сшъ → счъ	[sʂ] → [st͡ʂ]
с- (I)	шӏ	сшӏ → счӏ	[sʃʼ] → [sʈ͡ʂʼ]
с- (I)	шъу	сшъу → счъу	[sʃʷ] → [st͡ʂʷ]
с- (I)	шӏу	сшӏу → счӏу	[sʃʷʼ] → [sʈ͡ʂʷʼ]
шъу- (You pl.)	ш	шъуш → шъуч	[ʃʷʃ] → [ʃʷt͡ʃ]
шъу- (You pl.)	щ	шъущ → шъуч	[ʃʷɕ] → [ʃʷt͡ʃ]
шъу- (You pl.)	шъ	шъушъ → шъучъ	[ʃʷʂ] → [ʃʷt͡ʂ]
шъу- (You pl.)	шӏ	шъушӏ → шъучӏ	[ʃʷʃʼ] → [ʃʷʈ͡ʂʼ]
шъу- (You pl.)	шъу	шъушъу → шъучъу	[ʃʷʃʷ] → [ʃʷt͡ʂʷ]
шъу- (You pl.)	шӏу	шъушӏу → шъучӏу	[ʃʷʃʷʼ] → [ʃʷʈ͡ʂʷʼ]

When the change occurs The change only happens when the triggering prefix directly touches the affected consonant.

Example	Explanation
сшӏагъ → счӏагъ	The sound changes because the prefix с- comes directly before шӏ.
сшӏэрэп → счӏэрэп	The sound changes because the prefix с- comes directly before шӏ.
шъушӏагъ → шъучӏагъ	The sound changes because the prefix шъу- comes directly before шӏ.

When the change does NOT occur If there is a vowel in between the letters, or if a different consonant prefix is used, the sound does not harden.

Example	Explanation
сэшӏэ	No change. There is a vowel (э) separating the с and шӏ, preventing the sounds from interacting.
пшӏагъ	No change. The prefix is п-, which does not trigger the hardening.
ушӏагъ	No change. The prefix is у-, which does not trigger the hardening.
тшӏагъ	No change. The prefix is т-, which does not trigger the hardening.

Comprehensive Examples Below are extensive examples comparing the standard orthography with the spoken affrication in the Bzhedugh, Hatuqay and Shapsug dialects, demonstrating both the 1st Person Singular (с-) and 2nd Person Plural (шъу-) grammatical forms.

Examples of Affrication by Dialect
Meaning	Pronoun	Letter Change	Standard Adyghe (Base Form)	Bzhedugh, Hatuqay & Shapsug (Affricated Pronunciation)
I sealed it	I	сшъ → счъ	сшъыбыгъ	→ счъыбыгъ
You (pl.) sealed it	You (pl.)	шъушъ → шъучъ	шъушъыбыгъ	→ шъучъыбыгъ
I took (him/her to); I brought (him/her here; married)	I	сщ → сч	сщагъ къэсщагъ	→ счагъ къэсчагъ
You (pl.) took (him/her to); You (pl.) brought (him/her here)	You (pl.)	шъущ → шъуч	шъущагъ къэшъущагъ	→ шъучагъ къэшъучагъ
I bought I bought (dir.)	I	сщ → сч	сщэфыгъ къэсщэфыгъ	→ счэфыгъ къэсчэфыгъ
You (pl.) bought You (pl.) bought (dir.)	You (pl.)	шъущ → шъуч	шъущэфыгъ къэшъущэфыгъ	→ шъучэфыгъ къэшъучэфыгъ
I forgot I forgot (dir.)	I	сщ → сч	сщыгъупшыгъ къэсщыгъупшыгъ	→ счыгъупшыгъ къэсчыгъупшыгъ
You (pl.) forgot You (pl.) forgot (dir.)	You (pl.)	шъущ → шъуч	шъущыгъупшыгъ къэшъущыгъупшыгъ	→ шъучыгъупшыгъ къэшъучыгъупшыгъ
I don't know I don't know (dir.)	I	сшӏ → счӏ	сшӏэрэп къэсшӏэрэп	→ счӏэрэп къэсчӏэрэп
You (pl.) don't know You (pl.) don't know (dir.)	You (pl.)	шъушӏ → шъучӏ	шъушӏэрэп къэшъушӏэрэп	→ шъучӏэрэп къэшъучӏэрэп
I knew I knew (dir.)	I	сшӏ → счӏ	сшӏагъ къэсшӏагъ	→ счӏагъ къэсчӏагъ
You (pl.) knew You (pl.) knew (dir.)	You (pl.)	шъушӏ → шъучӏ	шъушӏагъ къэшъушӏагъ	→ шъучӏагъ къэшъучӏагъ
I thought I thought (dir.)	I	сшӏ → счӏ	сшӏошӏыгъ къэсшӏошӏыгъ	→ счӏошӏыгъ къэсчӏошӏыгъ
You (pl.) thought You (pl.) thought (dir.)	You (pl.)	шъушӏ → шъучӏ	шъушӏошӏыгъ къэшъушӏошӏыгъ	→ шъучӏошӏыгъ къэшъучӏошӏыгъ
It fits me It fits me (dir.)	I	сщ → сч	сщэфэ къэсщэфэ	→ счэфэ къэсчэфэ
It fits you (pl.); It fits you (pl.) (dir.)	You (pl.)	шъущ → шъуч	шъущэфэ къэшъущэфэ	→ шъучэфэ къэшъучэфэ
I laughed at him/her	I	сщ → сч	сщыгушӏукӏыгъ	→ счыгушӏукӏыгъ
You (pl.) laughed at him/her	You (pl.)	шъущ → шъуч	шъущыгушӏукӏыгъ	→ шъучыгушӏукӏыгъ

== Grammar ==
=== Instrumental case ===
The Hatuqay dialect exhibits distinct phonetic shifts when compared to the West Circassian literary standard (based largely on the Chemguy dialect). In the instrumental case the noun has the suffix -джэ (unlike other dialects that has the suffix -кӀэ):

English	Adyghe (West Circassian)			Kabardian (East Circassian)	
English	Hatuqay	Literary Standard (West)	Shapsug	Literary Standard (East)	Besleney
In Circassian	Адыгабзэджэ	АдыгабзэкIэ	Адыгабзэгьэ	АдыгэбзэкIэ	Адыгэбзэгьэ
With the book	тхылъымджэ	тхылъымкIэ	тхылъымгьэ	тхылъымкIэ	тхылъымгьэ
With feet	лъакъомджэ	лъакъомкIэ	лъакъомгьэ	лъакъуэмкӀэ	лъакъуэмгьэ
According to me	сэрыджэ	сэрыкIэ	сэрыгьэ	сэркӀэ	сэргьэ

=== Future tense ===
A primary morphological distinction of Hatuqay is the future tense suffix. While the West Literary and Abzakh dialects use the suffix -щт, the Hatuqay dialect uses -т. This feature is shared with the Bzhedug dialect and some subgroups of Shapsug:

English	Adyghe (West Circassian)		
English	Hatuqay & Bzhedug	Shapsug (Variant)	Literary Standard
I will go	сыкӀот	сыкӀот	сыкIощт
You will go	укӀот	укӀот	укIощт
He/She will go	кIот	рэкӀот	кIощт
We will go	тыкӀот	тыкӀот	тыкIощт
You (pl.) will go	шъукӀот	шъукӀот	шъукIощт
They will go	кIотых	рэкӀотых	кIощтых

=== Interrogative words ===
The word "what" in Standard Adyghe is сыд while in Hatuqay it is шъыд and from it derives different terms.

Word	Adyghe (West Circassian)	
Word	Hatuqay	Literary Standard
what	шъыд	сыд
why	шъыда	сыда
why	да	сыда
why "for what"	шъыд пае	сыд пае
when	шъыдигъо	сыдигъо
so	шъыдэу	сыдэу
with what	шъыдджэ	сыдкӀэ
how	шъыдэущтэу	сыдэущтэу
how much	шъыд фэдиз	сыд фэдиз
always	шъыдигъуи	сыдигъуи

Hatuqay has other words for "what":

- шъыд
- дыра

=== Third-person plural possessive prefix ===
In the West Literary standard, the third-person plural possessive prefix is а-. However, the Hatuqay dialect uses я-, a feature it shares with the Shapsug dialect and the Kabardian (East Circassian) language:

English	Adyghe (West Circassian)		Kabardian (East Circassian)
English	Hatuqay	Literary Standard	Literary Standard
The strongest of them	янахь лъэшыр	анахь лъэшыр	я нэхъ лъэщыр
The most beautiful of them	янахь дахэр	анахь дахэр	я нэхъ дахэр

=== Preverbs ===
The preverb къы- functions freely across all dialects, sub-dialects, and the Adyghe literary language: къы-одэӀу —- "he/she listens to you." However, in standart Adyghe, when this preverb meets a personal marker, the vowel component of the preverb къы- drops out (elision) in rapid speech. However, in the Hatuqay dialect, the vowel is typically retained. For example:

English	Adyghe (West Circassian)	
English	Hatuqay	Literary Standard
He/She looked at you	къы-о-плъыгъ	къ-о-плъыгъ
He/She is waiting for you	къы-у-а-жэ	къ-о-жэ

In several instances, dialects and sub-dialects present different phonetic variants of the same preverbs:

English	Adyghe (West Circassian)	
English	Hatuqay	Literary Standard
To step on someone/something	джъэхэ-хьан	жэхэ-хьан
To look at someone/something	джъэхэ-плъэн	жэхэ-плъэн

=== Presumptive and Obligatory Moods ===
In the standart dialect, both presumptive mood expressing probability ("likely," "probably") and the obligatory mood expressing necessity ("must," "necessary") are the same. However, in Hatuqay, they are distinguished:

Form	Adyghe (West Circassian)	
Form	Hatuqay	Literary Standard
Presumptive (Probability)	кIуагъэн фае "Probably went"	кIогъэн фае "Probably went"
Presumptive (Probability)	фэгъэсагъэн фае "Probably accustomed"	жъогъэн фае "Probably plowed"
Obligatory (Necessity)	кIогъэн (кIуэгъэн) фае "Must go"	кIогъэн фае "Must go"
Obligatory (Necessity)	фэгъэсэгъэн фае "Necessary to accustom"	жъогъэн фае "Need to plow"

The morphological formants of the Hatuqay dialect largely coincide with those of the Bzhedug dialect. This is particularly evident in preverbs like къа-, фа-, and ха-, which utilize a different vowel sound than their Chemguy counterparts:

English	Adyghe (West Circassian)	
English	Hatuqay	Literary Standard
Comes here	къа-кIо	къэ-кIо
Goes there	фа-кIо	фэ-кIо

A specific phonetic difference observed in Hatuqay is the inversion of the vowels ы and э in reflexive and spatial preverbs:

English	Adyghe (West Circassian)	
English	Hatuqay	Literary Standard
To tie something to oneself	зыхэ-шIэн	зэхэ-шIэн
To feel / To sense something	зэхэ-шIэн	зыхэ-шIэн

=== Present participles ===
In standard Adyghe, present participles (often functioning equivalently to gerunds) decline using standard nominal case suffixes. However, the Shapsug, Bzhedugh, and Hatuqay dialects feature a distinct phonological elision in the absolutive case, where the final absolutive suffix -р (-r) is not pronounced.

Consequently, absolutive present participles in these dialects end simply in -рэ instead of the standard -рэр. For example, the standard Adyghe phrase кӀалэу кӀорэр ("the boy who is going") is realized in these dialects as кӀалэу кӀорэ.

Present Participle Declension (e.g., кӀон - "to go")
Case	Standard Adyghe	Shapsug, Bzhedugh & Hatuqay
Absolutive	кӀорэр	кӀорэ
Ergative / Oblique	кӀорэм	кӀорэм
Instrumental	кӀорэмкӀэ	кӀорэмкӀэ

=== Demonstratives ===
Adyghe has three main demonstratives to indicate spatial proximity and visibility, which frequently act as determiners or prefixes attached to nouns, verbs, or adverbs:

- а- – That (invisible or out of the speaker's line of sight)
- мо- – That (visible to the speaker)
- мы- – This (close proximity to the speaker)

In the Shapsug, Bzhedugh, and Hatuqay dialects, the standard visible demonstrative мо- is replaced by a different prefix. Additionally, these dialects use a different locative suffix (-у or -уджэ) compared to the standard Adyghe -кӀэ.

- Shapsug: The visible demonstrative prefix is pronounced as a labial glide [w]. In Cyrillic, this is represented by a vowel shift (e.g., forming оу).
- Bzhedugh & Hatuqay: The visible demonstrative shifted and is pronounced as a glottal fricative [h]. Because the standard Adyghe Cyrillic alphabet lacks an official letter for this specific "h" sound, the digraph хӀ (using the Cyrillic palochka) is used in the orthography to replace the standard мо-.

The following table illustrates the general locative forms derived from these demonstratives. Note that the locative suffix -у remains consistent across the dialects; only the visible demonstrative prefix changes:

Word	Shapsug		Bzhedugh & Hatuqay		Standard Adyghe	
Word	IPA	Cyrillic	IPA	Cyrillic	IPA	Cyrillic
here	məw, məwd͡ʒa	мыу, мыуджэ	məw, məwd͡ʒa	мыу, мыуджэ	mət͡ʃʼa	мыкӀэ
there (visible)	waw, wawd͡ʒa	оу, оуджэ	how, howd͡ʒa	хӀоу, хӀоуджэ	mot͡ʃʼa	мокӀэ
there (invisible)	aːw, aːwd͡ʒa	ау, ауджэ	aːw, aːwd͡ʒa	ау, ауджэ	aːt͡ʃʼa	акӀэ
there (emphasis)	d͡ʒaw, d͡ʒawd͡ʒa	джэу, джэуджэ	d͡ʒaw, d͡ʒawd͡ʒa	джэу, джэуджэ	d͡ʒət͡ʃʼa	джэкӀэ
where	taw, tawd͡ʒa	тэу, тэуджэ	taw, tawd͡ʒa	тэу, тэуджэ	tət͡ʃʼa	тэкӀэ

==== Usage with Nouns ====
When modifying nouns, these demonstratives precede the noun to indicate its spatial relationship and visibility to the speaker. For example, using the noun кӀалэ (boy) in Bzhedugh and Hatuqay:

- а кӀалэ – that boy (invisible or out of sight)
- хӀо кӀалэ – that boy (visible); that boy over there
- мы кӀалэ – this boy

==== Usage as Prefixes ====
To demonstrate how this visible demonstrative functions as a bound prefix, the base хӀо- attaches directly to various roots and suffixes in Bzhedugh and Hatuqay to form demonstrative pronouns, adverbs of time, and manner (acting as the direct equivalent to the standard мо-):

- хӀодэ – there
- хӀоры – that's it; there he is
- хӀоу – there
- хӀоущтэу – like that
- хӀощгъум – then

The following table illustrates these derivations across dialects:

Meaning	Bzhedugh & Hatuqay		Standard Adyghe		Standard Kabardian	
Meaning	Cyrillic	IPA	Cyrillic	IPA	Cyrillic	IPA
that (abs.)	хӀор	hawr	мор	mawr	мор	mawr
that (erg.)	хӀой	hawj	мощ	mawɕ	мобы	mawbə
using that	хӀощджэ	hawɕd͡ʒa	мощкӀэ	mawɕt͡ʃʼa	-	-
like that	хӀоущтэу	hawɕtaw	моущтэу	mawɕtaw	мопхуэдэу	mawpxʷadaw
that is it	хӀоры	hawrə	моры	mawrə	мораш	mawraːɕ
there	хӀодэ	hawda	модэ	mawda	модэ	mawda
there (locative)	хӀоу	haw	моу	maw	-	-
the other	хӀодрэ	hawdra	модрэ	mawdra	модрэ	mawdra
then	хӀощгъум	hawɕʁʷəm	мощгъум	mawɕʁʷəm	-	-
like that (similar)	хӀощфэд	hawɕfad	мощфэд	mawɕfad	мопхуэд	mawpxʷad

===== Sentence Comparison =====
The practical application of the хӀо vs. мо distinction can be seen in conversational contexts. Notice how Hatuqay also utilizes the vocabulary word гущаӀэ instead of the standard гущыӀэ for "speak", and the suffix -джэ where standard Adyghe uses -кӀэ. In addition, the native Къэфкъас is used instead of the Russianized spelling Кавказ used in the Caucasus.

English Translation	Hatuqay Adyghe	Standard Adyghe
Did you hear how that boy speaks? The one standing there, that is the dialect I referred to. We don't talk like that; the way that person is speaking is like how they speak in the Caucasus.	хӀо кӀалэр зэрэгущаӀэрэр оӀугъа? хӀодэ Ӏутыр, хӀоры диалектэу зыфэсӀуагъагъэр. Тэ хӀоущтэу тыгущаӀэрэп, хӀор зэрэгущаӀэрэр къэфкъасымджэ зэрэгущаӀэхэрэмэ афэд.	мо кӀалэр зэрэгущыӀэрэр оӀугъа? модэ Ӏутыр, моры диалектэу зыфэсӀуагъагъэр. Тэ мощтэу тыгущыӀэрэп, мор зэрэгущыӀэрэр кавказымкӀэ зэрэгущыӀэхэрэмэ афэд.

=== Location ===
Adyghe demonstratives mark three degrees of deixis: proximal мы- ("this; here"), medial мо- ("that; there", in view), and distal а- ("that; there", out of view). Standard Adyghe derives adverbs of place from these roots with two series, named here by their distal forms акӀэ and адэ — e.g. proximal мыкӀэ~мыдэ "here", medial мокӀэ~модэ "(over) there", distal акӀэ~адэ "yonder".

Many dialects, among them Shapsug, Bzhedugh and part of Abzakh, lack the акӀэ series altogether; in its place they use four series — адэ, а тӀэкӀум (with the postposition тӀэкӀу(м) "a bit, a spot"), ау and аукӀэ. Two regular correspondences distinguish these western dialects. In the аукӀэ series the final element — Standard -кӀэ /-t͡ʃʼa/ — surfaces as -гьэ /-ɡʲa/ in Shapsug (аугьэ) and as -джэ /-d͡ʒa/ in Bzhedugh (ауджэ). Second, the medial root мо- is reduced to о- /wa-/ in both Shapsug and Bzhedugh (модэ, моу → одэ, оу). Bzhedugh and the Hatuqay subdialect behave identically and are shown together.

Meaning	Series	Variety			
Meaning	Series	Standard Adyghe	Shapsug	Bzhedugh / Hatuqay	Abzakh (some)
here (мы-/мэ-)	акӀэ	мыкӀэ /mət͡ʃʼa/	—		
here (мы-/мэ-)	адэ	мыдэ /məda/	мыдэ /məda/	мыдэ /məda/	мыдэ /məda/
here (мы-/мэ-)	а тӀэкӀум	—	мы тӀэкӀум /mə tʼakʷʼəm/	мы тӀэкӀум /mə tʼakʷʼəm/	мы тӀэкӀум /mə tʼakʷʼəm/
here (мы-/мэ-)	ау	—	мэу /maw/	мэу /maw/	мэу /maw/
here (мы-/мэ-)	аукӀэ	—	мэугьэ /mawɡʲa/	мэуджэ /mawd͡ʒa/	мэукӀэ /mawt͡ʃʼa/
there, visible (мо-/о-)	акӀэ	мокӀэ /mot͡ʃʼa/	—		
there, visible (мо-/о-)	адэ	модэ /moda/	одэ /wada/	одэ /wada/	модэ /moda/
there, visible (мо-/о-)	а тӀэкӀум	—	о тӀэкӀум /wa tʼakʷʼəm/	о тӀэкӀум /wa tʼakʷʼəm/	мо тӀэкӀум /mo tʼakʷʼəm/
there, visible (мо-/о-)	ау	—	оу /waw/	оу /waw/	моу /mow/
there, visible (мо-/о-)	аукӀэ	—	оугьэ /wawɡʲa/	оуджэ /wawd͡ʒa/	моукӀэ /mowt͡ʃʼa/
there, out of sight (а-)	акӀэ	акӀэ /aːt͡ʃʼa/	—		
there, out of sight (а-)	адэ	адэ /aːda/	адэ /aːda/	адэ /aːda/	адэ /aːda/
there, out of sight (а-)	а тӀэкӀум	—	а тӀэкӀум /aː tʼakʷʼəm/	а тӀэкӀум /aː tʼakʷʼəm/	а тӀэкӀум /aː tʼakʷʼəm/
there, out of sight (а-)	ау	—	ау /aːw/	ау /aːw/	ау /aːw/
there, out of sight (а-)	аукӀэ	—	аугьэ /aːwɡʲa/	ауджэ /aːwd͡ʒa/	аукӀэ /aːwt͡ʃʼa/

The interrogative тэ- "where" and the emphatic demonstrative (Standard джэ-, Shapsug гьэ-) take the same series: Standard тэкӀэ and джэкӀэ correspond to Shapsug тэу~тэугьэ and гьэу~гьэугьэ.

== Vocabulary ==
The Hatuqay dialect shares a lot of its vocabulary with Bzhedug and Chemguy, and also employs some unique words:

Vocabulary Comparison
English	Adyghe (West Circassian)		Kabardian (East Circassian)
English	Hatuqay	Literary Standard (West)	Literary Standard (East)
To fall	ебэджын	ефэхын	ехуэхын
Mat	пIуаблэ	арджан	арджэн
Wide	шъуабгъо	шъуамбгъо	фабгъуэ
What	шъыд / дыра	сыд	сыт
Why	да	сыда	сыт щхьэкӀэ
Ball	Iэгуау	пIырагу	топ
Princess	гощэ	гуащэ	гуащэ
Tea	псыплъыжь "red water"	щай	шей
Coffee	псышӀуцӀэ "black water"	кофе / къэхьыо	кофе / къэхьэуэ
Potato	къантIуф	картоф	кӀэртӀоф
Money	нэгъэцӀыу "eye-shiner"	ахъщ	ахъшэ
Grandmother	нэожъ	нэнэжъ	нанэ

Despite being a Western dialect, it also shares some vocabulary with Kabardian:

Lexical Parallels
English	Adyghe (West Circassian)		Kabardian (East Circassian)
English	Hatuqay	Literary Standard (West)	Literary Standard (East)
Pig	кхъо	къо	кхъуэ
Chair	щэнт	пхъэнтӀэкӀу	шэнт
Bread	кӀакъу	хьалыгъу	щӀакхъуэ
Twin	тIолъфэныкъу	тIуазэ	тӀолъхуэныкъуэ

=== Diaspora vs Caucasus differences ===
Since the Hatuqay dialect is not spoken in the Caucasus and spoken mostly in Turkey, the only variant of the Hatuqay dialect is the diaspora variant. Thus, many diaspora Adyghe features are also seen in Hatuqay. For instance, in some cases, where standart Adyghe uses Russian loanwords, Hatuqay (like other diaspora) has native terms instead:

English	Adyghe (West Circassian)	
English	Hatuqay - Diaspora	Literary Standard
Car	ку	машинэ
Ice cream	щатэмыл "ice kaymak"	морожнэ

In addition to native terms, there are Turkish loanwords that do not exist in literary Adyghe, which are occasionally used alongside native equivalents:

English	Adyghe (West Circassian)		Turkish
English	Hatuqay - Diaspora (Loanword; diaspora only)	Native equivalent (Also used in diaspora)	Turkish
But	Ӏамэ	ао	ama
Construction	иншыхьэт	гъэпсыгъэ	inşaat
Goodbye ("We leave you to God")	Алыхьсмэлэдыкъ	Тхьэм шъукъегъэгъун	Allah'a ısmarladık
More	дэхьэ	нахь	daha
Province	уилает	къедзыгъо	vilayet
School	мэкътэб	еджапӀэ	mektep
State	долэт	къэралыгъо	devlet
Young man	дэлекъаны	кӀалэ	delikanlı
That is (filler)	яни	-	yani
I swear (filler)	уэлахьэ-билахьэ	-	vallahi billahi

Like other diaspora variants of the Adyghe language, internationalisms in the Hatuqay dialect have been borrowed via Turkish, thus differ slightly from literary Adyghe which borrowed them from Russian:

English	Adyghe (West Circassian)		Turkish	Russian
English	Diaspora	Literary Standard	Turkish	Russian
American	Амэрикэн	Американ	Amerikan	Американец
Europe	Аурыпэ	Европэ	Avrupa	Европа
Cigarette	джыкъарэ	сигаретэ	sigara	сигарета
Japan	Жапон	Японие	Japonya	Япония
High school	лисэ	лицей	lise	лицей
Furniture	мобилие	мебель	mobilya	мебель
Bus	отобюс	aвтобус	otobüs	автобус
Television	телевизион	телевизор	televizyon	телевизор

== Etymology and classification ==
=== Classification ===
- Proto‑Circassian
  - Proto-East Circassian
    - Kabardian
    - Besleney
  - Proto‑West Circassian
    - Kuban river
      - Chemguy
      - Abzakh
      - Bzhedugh
      - Hatuqay
    - Black Sea coast
      - Shapsug
      - Natukhaj

A Circassian dialects family tree.

Circassian languages are divided into two groups: "West Circassian", known in English as "Adyghe", and "East Circassian", known in English as "Kabardian". The two are closely related and mutually intelligible to some degree. Both Adyghe and Kabardian speakers refer to their language as "Adyghe" and consider the eastern and western language variants to be dialects of one Circassian Adyghe language, rather than two related languages.

Hatuqay is classified as a dialect of West Circassian, or Adyghe. Within the western group, Hatuqay is classified as one of the "Steppe dialects", a subgroup of that also includes the Chemguy, Abzakh and Bzhedug dialects, although it also shares many grammatical and phonological features with the "Coastal Dialects" of Shapsug and Natukhaj. Thus, it can be considered an "in-between" dialect. Although a dialect of Western Circassian (Adyghe), it is considered the closest among the Western dialects to East Circassian. This may be a diaspora phenomenon that came to be due to frequent interaction with Kabardians in Kayseri, Turkey, as Hatuqays are a minority among the majority Kabardians.

=== Etymology ===
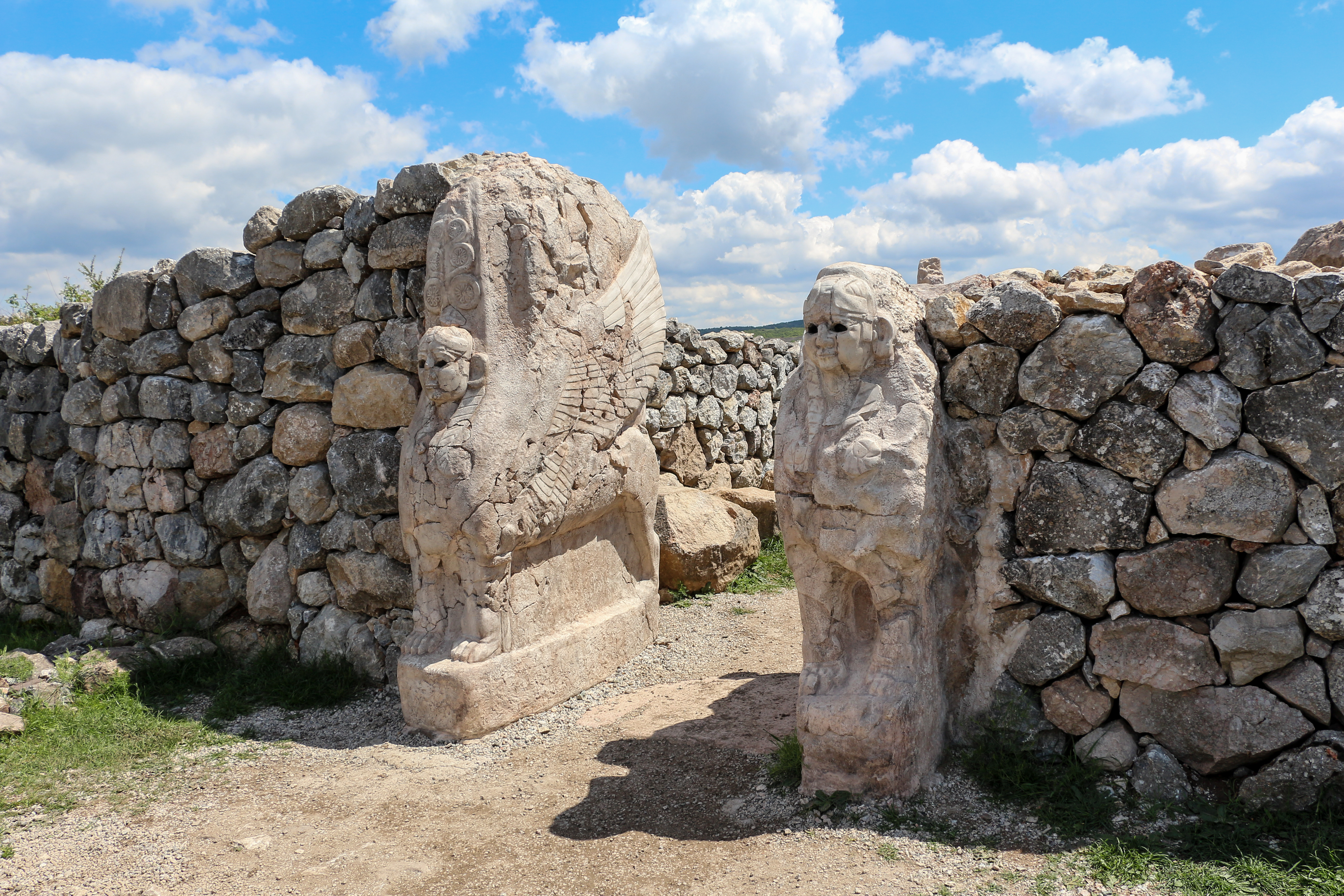
Sphinx gate in Hattusa

The Hatuqay dialect takes its name from the Hatuqay tribe, which is believed to derive from Prince Hatuqo (Adyghe: Хьатыкъо), who, according to traditional Circassian genealogies, was the founder of the Hatuqay Principality, and a prince descended from King Inal.

The name has been the subject of a folk etymology, which explains it as referring to the Hittites ('Son of Hittite'). A study about Circassians in Kayseri found that local Circassians frequently claimed descent from the Hittites. The etymology of Hattusa, capital of the Hittite Empire, is explained with Circassian хьэтӀу (two dogs) + щхьэ (head), which supposedly refers to the two sphinx statues guarding the gate of Hattusa. Some connected the Circassians with the Hattians rather than Hittites; and some authors explained the etymology of "Hatuqay" as "Hatti-Son". The Adyghe Encyclopedia published in Russia compares Hattian mythology and Nart sagas, including stories found in the Hatuqay Nart corpus. The Hittites spoke an Indo-European language, however the possibility of Hattians speaking a Northwest Caucasian language related to Circassian has been considered by linguists, although this is unconfirmed.

== History and distribution ==
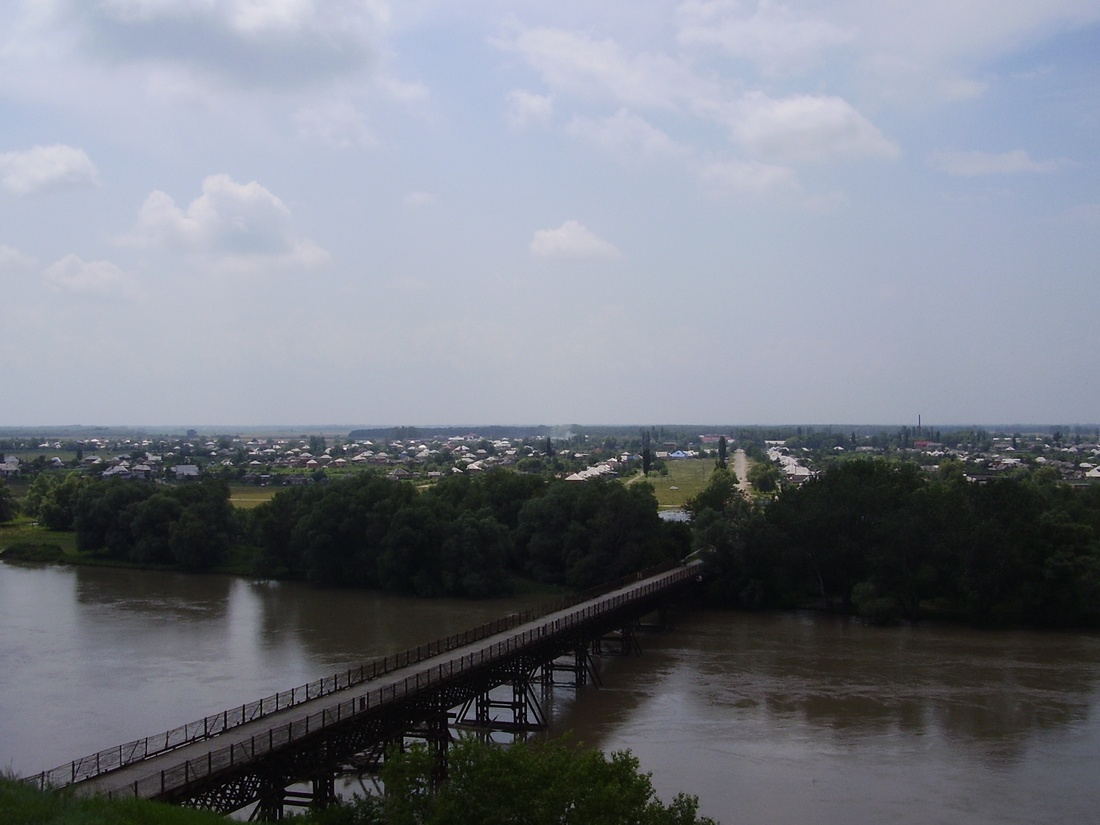
In the village of Khatukay in the Republic of Adygea, located in historical Hatuqay territory, Circassians are a minority and speak the standart Chemguy dialect.

Historically, the Hatuqay dialect was spoken in the Hatuqay Principality, which was originally located near the Black Sea coast, as well as the southern banks of the Kuban, a little further down from where the Afips (Афыпс) river flows. However, in the late 18th century, Hatuqay Principality was relocated west of the Chemguys, in the territory situated between the Belaya (Шъхьагуащэ) and Pshish (Пщыщ) rivers. The Hatuqay dialect is one of the dialects which play a pivotal role in the preservation of the Nart sagas. Many Nart sagas have been recorded in variants of the Hatuqay dialect. The Hatuqay dialect was recorded by Ottoman traveller Evliya Çelebi in the 17th century, who visited the Hatuqay region:

This Circassian language, even now, cannot be written down; it is a language based on listening, produced from the throat, cheeks, and under the tongue, a sound that is like a sparrow's chirp and cannot be committed to paper. This humble servant of God, a traveler of the world and companion to man, the unpretentious Evliya, has traveled for 51 years, setting foot in 18 kingdoms across seven climes, and has written down 147 languages with my gem-scattering pen, including their eloquence, rhetoric, and poems, in order to converse with the people of every region. But I could not write down this Circassian language with its magpie-like sound. By the will of God, we will try to write this language as best as we can. They have a peculiar dialect, for they are not literate. That is why it cannot be committed to paper; it is a bird's language, and that is that.

— Evliya Çelebi, Seyahatname

Following the Circassian genocide and exile, the Hatuqay population was dispersed, the tribe effectively disappeared from the map. Currently, there are no remaining speakers of the Hatuqay dialect in the Caucasus region. Almost the entire Hatuqay tribe was exiled; the few Hatuqay remaining in the Caucasus have assimilated into the Chemguy dialect. The dialect survives in the diaspora, specifically in Turkey. It is spoken in approximately 20 Circassian villages located in the Pınarbaşı district of the Kayseri province (spesifically around Çörümşek valley), as well as in Bozüyük and Biga. Consequently, Circassian dialectology studies conducted within the Caucasus rarely mention or analyze Hatuqay. Thus, the collection of data from the diaspora in Turkey is considered essential to filling the gaps in the study of this dialect. Data on the Hatuqay dialect is largely drawn from acoustic analyses of diaspora communities.

Among Circassians in Kayseri, mastery of Kabardian is considered a primary social competency, regardless of an individual's tribe. Consequently, some Hatuqays primarily use Kabardian in their daily interactions. Some Hatuqay Circassians in Kayseri do not know Hatuqay at all and speak Kabardian instead of their native Hatuqay dialect. In Kayseri, there are also some Circassians of Shapsug and Makhosh origin who now identify as Hatuqay.

== Sample text ==
Spesific examples to demonstrate changes in the Hatuqay dialect:

Hatuqay Adyghe (Turkey)	Standard Adyghe (Republic of Adygea)	English Translation
Тэдэ укъакӀо мы чъуакъэмджэ?	Тыдэ укъэкӀо мы цуакъэмкӀэ?	Where are you going with these shoes?
СчынахьыкӀэ гущаӀэ къысиӀуагъ: "Мыслъымэнхэу тэ кхъо лыр тышхырэп. Ар мэкътэбым щызэзгъэшIагъ!"	СшынахьыкӀэ гущыӀэ къысиӀуагъ: "Быслъымэнхэу тэ къо лыр тышхырэп. Ар еджапIэм щызэзгъэшIагъ!"	My younger brother told me a word: "As Muslims, we do not eat the meat of pigs. I learned that at school!"
Нэожъыр псыплъыжь ешъо.	Нэнэжъыр щай ешъо.	Grandmother drinks tea.
Сэ Iэгуаум лъакъомджэ сеуагъ.	Сэ пIырагум лъакъомкIэ сеуагъ.	I hit the ball with my foot.
Ар шъыд? Ар нэгъэцIыу!	Ар сыд? Ар ахъщ!	What is that? That is money!
Уэчылыр Аурыпэм отобюсымджэ кIуагъэ.	Адвокатыр Европэм автобусымкIэ кIуагъэ.	The lawyer went to Europe by bus.
Тэ къуаджэм къантIуф щытышхыт.	Тэ къуаджэм картоф щытышхыщт.	We will eat potatoes in the village.
Сэ щатэмыл сшхынэу псышIуцIэ сешъонэу сыфае.	Сэ морожнэ сшхынэу къэхьыо сешъонэу сыфае.	I want to eat ice cream and drink coffee.
Да? Зары сэ сы Адыг!	Сыда? Зары сэ сы Адыг!	Why? Because I'm Circassian!
