= Circassian languages =

Subdivision of the Northwest Caucasian language family

Circassian
- Cherkess
- Geographic distribution: North Caucasus
- Ethnicity: Circassians, Cherkesogai
- Linguistic classification: Northwest Caucasian: Circassian
- Proto-language: Proto-Circassian
- Subdivisions: Adyghe; Kabardian

Language codes
- Glottolog: circ1239
- Circassian

Circassian (Note: (/sɜːrˈkæʃən/)) (Adyghe: Адыгабзэ; Kabardian: Адыгэбзэ), also known as Cherkess (/tʃɜːrˈkɛs/ chur-KESS), is a subdivision of the Northwest Caucasian language family, spoken by the Circassian people. There are two main variants of the Circassian language, defined by their literary standards, Adyghe (кӀахыбзэ; also known as West Circassian) and Kabardian (къэбэрдейбзэ; also known as East Circassian). Despite phonological differences, Circassian languages are reciprocally intelligible, with speakers being able to communicate with varying degrees of efficiency. Some reject the distinction between the two languages in favour of both being dialects of a unitary Circassian language, others argue they are closely related but technically distinct languages.

Adyghe and Kabardian are generally considered typologically distinct languages. However, the local terms for these languages refer to them as dialects. The Circassian people call themselves адыгэ (Adyghe) in their native language. While the self-designation for both Adyghe and Kabardian language is Adyghe, in linguistic and administrative terms, "Adyghe" refers specifically to the language of the western tribes of Circassians, while "Kabardian" refers to the language of the two eastern tribes (Kabardians and Besleney).

In the southwestern part of European Russia, there is also a Federal Subject called Adygea (Russian: Адыгея, Adygeya), enclaved within Krasnodar Krai, which is named after the Circassian endonym. In the Russian language, the Circassian subdivision is treated as a group of languages and called адыгские (adygskie, meaning the Adyghe languages), whereas the Adyghe language is called адыгейский (adygeyskiy, "Adygean," meaning the language of those in the Republic of Adygea). The term адыгейский, meaning Adygean, has thus been mistranslated to English as "Adyghe language". The terms Circassian and Cherkess are sometimes used in several languages as synonyms for the Northwest Caucasian languages in general or the Adyghe language in particular.

== Circassian languages ==
Yinal speaking Adyghe and Kabardian.

- Proto-Circassian
  - Proto-East Circassian
    - Kabardian
    - Besleney
  - Proto‑West Circassian
    - Kuban river
      - Temirgoy
      - Abzakh
      - Bzhedugh
      - Hatuqay
    - Black Sea coast
      - Shapsug
      - Natukhaj

A Circassian dialects family tree.

- Circassian languages
  - Adyghe language
    - The Black Sea coast dialects
      - Zhaney dialect
      - Natukhai dialect (Adyghe: Нэтӏхъуаджэбзэ; Netʼx́uajebze)
      - Shapsug dialect (Adyghe: Шапсыгъабзэ; Shapsyǵabze)
        - North Shapsugs, Great Shapsugs, Kuban Shapsugs dialect (Adyghe: Шапсыгъэ шху; Shapsyǵ shyxu)
          - Kfar Kama dialect (Adyghe: Кфар Камэм ишапсыгъэбзэ; Kfar Kamem ishapsyǵebze): Shapsug dialect spoken by the villagers of Kfar Kama in Israel.
        - Temirgoy-Shapsugs, Pseuşko accent (Adyghe: Кӏэмгуе-шапсыгъ; Chʼemgueý-shapsyǵ)
        - South Shapsugs, Small Shapsugs, Coastal Shapsugs Black Sea Shapsugs (Adyghe: Шапсыгъэ-цӏыкӏу; Shapsyǵe-tsʼykʼu) dialect.
        - Hakuchi dialect (Adyghe: ХьакӀуцубзэ, Къарацхаибзэ; Hakʼutsubze, Qaratsxaibze)
    - The Kuban river dialects
      - Bzhedug dialect (Adyghe: Бжъэдыгъубзэ; Bɀedyǵubze): Spoken by the Circassians in Republic of Adygea and Biga.
      - Temirgoy (Adyghe: КӀэмыгуябзэ, КӀэмгуибзэ; Chʼemıguıyabze, Chʼemguibze): Literary Adyghe. Also spoken by the Circassians in Republic of Adygea.
      - Abzakh dialect (Adyghe: Aбдзэхабзэ; Abźaxabze): Spoken by the Circassians in Rehaniya in Israel and the Circassians in Syria from Golan Heights.
      - Mamkhegh dialect
      - Yegeruqway dialect
      - Hatuqay dialect
      - Makhosh dialect
  - Kabardian language
    - Kabardian
      - West Kabardian
        - Kuban
        - Kuban-Zelenchuk (Cherkess)
      - Central Kabardian
        - Baksan (Basis for the literary language)
        - Malka
      - Eastern Kabardian
        - Terek
        - Mozdok
      - North Kabardian
        - Mulka
        - Zabardiqa (1925 until 1991 Soviet Zaparika)
    - Baslaney dialect (Adyghe: Бэслъыныйбзэ; Besłınıýbze)

== Alphabets ==
=== Adyghe Alphabet ===
Adyghe language (also known as West Circassian, Adyghe: КӀахыбзэ; Kʼaxıbzə, Russian: Адыгейский язык) — The language of the west Circassian tribes: Shapsug, Abzakh, Natukhai, Bzhedug, Temirgoy. The Alphabet is based on the Temirgoy dialect. The Circassian alphabet was created in 1918 by the Kabardian linguist Naguma Shora.

Adyghe alphabet
А а [aː]	Б б [b]	В в [v]	Г г [ɣ]	Гу гу [ɡʷ]	Гъ гъ [ʁ]	Гъу гъу [ʁʷ]	Д д [d]
Дж дж [d͡ʒ]	Дз дз [d͡z]	Дзу дзу [d͡ʐʷ]	Е е [ja/aj]	Ё ё [jo]	Ж ж [ʒ]	Жъ жъ [ʐ]	Жъу жъу [ʐʷ]
Жь жь [ʑ]	З з [z]	И и [jə/əj]	Й й [j]	К к [k]	Ку ку [kʷ]	Къ къ [q]	Къу къу [qʷ]
КӀ кӀ [t͡ʃʼ]	КӀу кӀу [kʷʼ]	Л л [ɮ] or [l]	Лъ лъ [ɬ]	ЛӀ лӀ [ɬʼ]	М м [m]	Н н [n]	О о [aw/wa]
П п [p]	ПӀ пӀ [pʼ]	ПӀу пӀу [pʷʼ]	Р р [r]	С с [s]	Т т [t]	ТӀ тӀ [tʼ]	ТӀу тӀу [tʷʼ]
У у [w/əw]	Ф ф [f]	Х х [x]	Ху ху [xʷ]	Хъ хъ [χ]	Хъу хъу [χʷ]	Хь хь [ħ]	Ц ц [t͡s]
Цу цу [t͡ʂʷ]	ЦӀ цӀ [t͡sʼ]	Ч ч [t͡ʃ]	ЧӀ чӀ [t͡ʂʼ]	Чъ чъ [t͡ʂ]	Ш ш [ʃ]	Шъ шъ [ʂ]	Шъу шъу [ʂʷ]
ШӀ шӀ [ʂʼ]	ШӀу шӀу [ʂʷʼ]	Щ щ [ɕ]	Ъ ъ [ˠ]	Ы ы [ə]	Ь ь [ʲ]	Э э [a]	Ю ю [ju]
Я я [jaː]	Ӏ [ʔ]	Ӏу [ʔʷ]					

Lower-case palochka, ⟨ӏ⟩, is found in handwriting. Usually, palochka uppercase and lowercase forms consistent in print or upright, but only upper-case ⟨Ӏ⟩ is normally used in computers.

The Adyghe alphabet contains some inconsistencies between visual representation and pronunciation which can be a point of confusion for learners. It is tempting to read the Circassian alphabet letters phonologically, but this is not always accurate. For example:

- While the letter КӀ appears to represent [kʼ], it is actually pronounced as [t͡ʃʼ] (ЧӀ).
- ЧӀ is pronounced as the retroflex [t͡ʂʼ] (ЧӀъ).
- Цу is pronounced as [t͡ʂʷ] (Чъу).
- ШӀ is pronounced as [ʂʼ] (ШӀъ).
- ШӀу is pronounced as [ʂʷʼ] (ШӀъу).
- The letter Г represents the fricative [ɣ] rather than the stop [ɡ].
- The labialized Гу corresponds to the stop [ɡʷ].

Adyghe Dialectal letters
Гь гь [ɡʲ]	Джь джь [ɡʲ]	Кь кь [kʲ]	КӀь кӀь [kʲʼ]	СӀ сӀ [sʼ]	Ӏь [ʔʲ]

These letters are not part of the official alphabet, but they may appear in books that showcase the different dialects.

=== Kabardian Alphabet ===
Kabardian language (also known as East Circassian, Adyghe: Къэбэрдейбзэ; Qeberdeýbze, Russian: Кабардино-черкесский) — The language of the east Circassian tribes : Kabarday and Baslaney. The Alphabet is based on the Kabardian dialect.

Kabardian alphabet
А а [aː]	Э э [a]	Б б [b]	В в [v]	Г г [ɣ]	Гу гу [ɡʷ]	Гъ гъ [ʁ]	Гъу гъу [ʁʷ]
Д д [d]	Дж дж [d͡ʒ] or [ɡʲ]	Дз дз [d͡z]	Е е [ja/aj]	Ё ё [jo]	Ж ж [ʒ]	Жь жь [ʑ]	З з [z]
И и [jə/əj]	Й й [j]	К к [k]	Ку ку [kʷ]	Къ къ [q]	Къу къу [qʷ]	Кхъ кхъ [q͡χ]	Кхъу кхъу [q͡χʷ]
КӀ кӀ [t͡ʃʼ] or [kʲʼ]	КӀу кӀу [kʷʼ]	Л л [ɮ] or [l]	Лъ лъ [ɬ]	ЛӀ лӀ [ɬʼ]	М м [m]	Н н [n]	О о [aw/wa]
П п [p]	ПӀ пӀ [pʼ]	Р р [r]	С с [s]	Т т [t]	ТӀ тӀ [tʼ]	У у [w/əw]	Ф ф [f]
ФӀ фӀ [fʼ]	Х х [x]	Ху ху [xʷ]	Хъ хъ [χ]	Хъу хъу [χʷ]	Хь хь [ħ]	Ц ц [t͡s]	ЦӀ цӀ [t͡sʼ]
Ч ч [t͡ʃ]	Ш ш [ʃ]	Щ щ [ɕ]	ЩӀ щӀ [ɕʼ]	Ъ ъ [ˠ]	Ы ы [ə]	Ь ь [ʲ]	Ю ю [ju]
Я я [jaː]	Ӏ [ʔ]	Ӏу [ʔʷ]					

Lower-case palochka, ⟨ӏ⟩, is found in handwriting. Usually, palochka uppercase and lowercase forms consistent in print or upright, but only upper-case ⟨Ӏ⟩ is normally used in computers.

In the Kabardian alphabet, certain letters have dual pronunciations. КӀ is pronounced either as [kʼ] or as [t͡ʃʼ] (like ЧӀ), and Дж is pronounced either as [ɡʲ] (Гь) or as [d͡ʒ]. This variation is due to a historical sound shift: in Proto-Kabardian, these letters were originally [ɡʲ] and [kʼ], but they shifted to [d͡ʒ] and [t͡ʃʼ] in the majority of modern Kabardian dialects.

== Grammar ==
Circassian, like all Northwest Caucasian languages, has a basic subject–object–verb typology and is characterised by the ergative construction of sentences.

== Sound changes ==
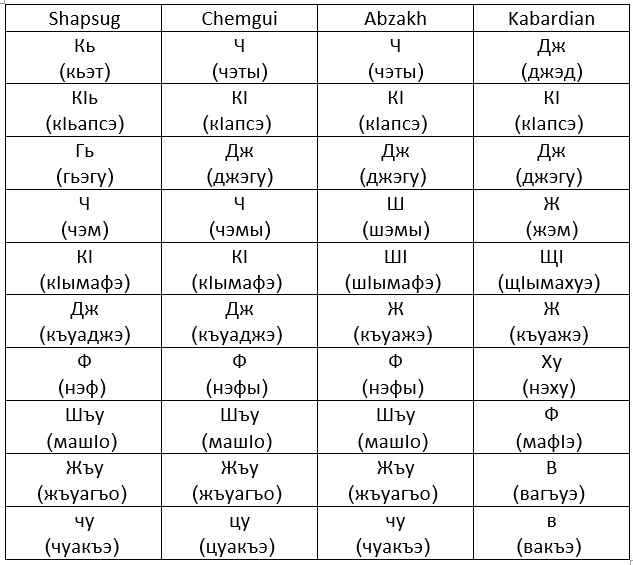
The major differences in the Circassian dialects

Sound changes between Adyghe (Temirgoy) and Kabardian:

Sound Change		Examples (Adyghe ↔ Kabardian)
Adyghe	Kabardian	Examples (Adyghe ↔ Kabardian)
a	э	адыгабзэ ↔ aдыгэбзэ (Adyghe); бае ↔ бей (rich); аслъан ↔ аслъэн (lion); къэплъан ↔ къаплъэн (tiger); дунай ↔ дуней (world); тхьакӀумэ ↔ тхьэкӀумэ (ear); хьарыф ↔ хьэрф (letter); тхьаркъо ↔ тхьэрыкъуэ (pigeon); Ӏае ↔ Ӏей (ugly); хьамлыу ↔ хьэмбылу (worm); хьау ↔ хьэуэ (no)
ы	э	ны ↔ анэ (mother)
э	ы	хъэдэн ↔ хъыдан (lilac)
а	ы	Ӏахьыл ↔ Ӏыхьлы (cloth)
и	ы	мэлэӀич ↔ мэлэӀыч (angel)
ы	и	сабый ↔ сабий (child)
ы	е	жъэжъый ↔ жьэжьей (kidney); дэжъый ↔ дэжьей (hazelnut)
ц	дз	цэ ↔ дзэ (tooth); цыгъо ↔ дзыгъуэ (mouse); пцэжъый ↔ бдзэжьей (fish); уцы ↔ удзы (grass)
цу	в	цу ↔ вы (ox); цуакъэ ↔ вакъэ (shoe); цунды ↔ вынд (raven); цуабзэ ↔ вабдзэ (ploughshare)
ч	ж	чэмы ↔ жэм (cow); чъыгы ↔ жыг (tree); чэщы ↔ жэщ (night); чылэ ↔ жылэ (village, settlement); пчъын ↔ бжын (to count); чъэн ↔ жэн (to run)
ч	дж	чэтыу ↔ джэду (cat); чэты ↔ джэд (chicken); апч ↔ абдж (glass)
ч	щ	пачъыхь ↔ пащтыхь (king); гъучӏы ↔ гъущӏ (iron); упчӏэ ↔ упщӏэ (question); чыӏу ↔ щӏыӏу (button); чъыӏэ ↔ щӏыӏэ (cold); пчэдыжьы ↔ пщэдджыжь (morning)
дз	з	хъырбыдз ↔ хъарбыз (watermelon)
дж	ж	баджэ ↔ бажэ (fox); лъэмыдж ↔ лъэмыж (arch, bridge); аджал ↔ ажал (death); хьаджыгъэ ↔ хьэжыгъэ (flour); лъэгуанджэ ↔ лъэгуажьэ (knee); къуаджэ ↔ къуажэ (village)
жь	з	ежь ↔ езы (him, itself)
жъ	жь	жъы ↔ жьы (old); бжъэ ↔ бжьэ (bowl, horn, slander); жъэн ↔ жьэн (to fry, to grill)
ж	жь	бжыхьэ ↔ бжьыхьэ (autumn); жакӀэ ↔ жьакӀэ (beard); бжыдзэ ↔ бжьыдзэ (flea); жэ ↔ жьэ (mouth)
жъу	в	жъуагъо ↔ вагъо (star); зэжъу ↔ зэвы (narrow); ӏужъу ↔ ӏувы (wide); гъэжъон ↔ гъэвэн (to boil)
ш	щ	нашэ ↔ нащэ (melon)
щ	ш	щэ ↔ шэ (milk); щай ↔ шай (tea); щыгъу ↔ шыгъу (salt); ахъщэ ↔ ахъшэ (fund, money); щэбзащ ↔ шабзэ (arrow); щыды ↔ шыд (donkey); щынагъо ↔ шынагъуэ (fear); щыбжьый ↔ шыбжий (black pepper); щэджагъо ↔ шэджагъуэ (noon)
шъ	щ	шъабэ ↔ щабэ; шъхьэ ↔ щхьэ (head); шъынэ ↔ щынэ (lamp); дышъэ ↔ дыщэ (gold); пшъашъэ ↔ пщащэ (girl); мышъэ ↔ мыщэ (bear); псэушъхь ↔ псэущхьэ (animal); шъэ ↔ ща (100)
шӀ	щӀ	шӀын ↔ щӀын (to do); шӀэн ↔ щӀэн (to know); гъашӀэ ↔ гъащӀэ (life); пшӀы ↔ пщӀы (ten)
кӀ	щӀ	кӀэ ↔ щӀэ (new); кӀалэ ↔ щӀалэ (young-man); мэгыкӀэ ↔ мэгыщӀэ (to launder, to wash); тӀэкӀын ↔ тӀэщӀын (to go off on); икӀыӀу ↔ ищӀыӀу (above); макӀэ ↔ мащӀэ (few); хьакӀэ ↔ хьэщӀэ (guest); ӀункӀыбзэ ↔ ӀунщӀыбз (key)
шъу	ф	шъоу ↔ фо (honey); шъуз ↔ фыз (wife); ешъон ↔ ефэн (to drink); уашъо ↔ уафэ (sky); уцышъо ↔ удзыфэ (green); къашъо ↔ къафэ (dance); шъо ↔ фэ (color, skin, you (plural)); нэшъу ↔ нэф (blind)
шӀу	фӀ	шӀу ↔ фӀы (well, good); машӀо ↔ мафӀэ (fire); шӀуцӀэ ↔ фӀыцӀэ (black); шӀомыкӀы ↔ фӀамыщӀ (coal); ошӀу ↔ уэфӀ (weather); ӏэшӀу ↔ ӏэфӀ (sweet); шӀошӏын ↔ фӀэщын (sweet)
ф	ху	фыжьы ↔ хужьы (white); Ӏофы ↔ Ӏуэху (work, job); мафэ ↔ махуэ (day); гъэмафэ ↔ гъэмахуэ (summer); цӀыфы ↔ цӀыху (person); фабэ ↔ хуабэ (hot); фае ↔ хуей (want, need); фэд ↔ хуэд (like); нэфы ↔ нэху (light); нартыф ↔ нартыху (maize); фэгъэгъун ↔ хуэгъэгъун (to forgive); бжьыныф ↔ бжьыныху (garlic); бзылъфыгъэ ↔ бзылъхугъэ (woman)
хь	хъ	нахь ↔ нэхъ (more); шынахьыкӏ ↔ шынэхъыщӏ (younger brother); шынахьыжъ ↔ шынэхъыжь (older brother)
къ	кхъ	къэ ↔ кхъэ (grave)
къу	кхъу	къуае ↔ кхъуей (cheese); къужъы ↔ кхъужь (pear); къухьэ ↔ кхъухь (ship)
т	д	тэ ↔ дэ (we); тамэ ↔ дамэ (shoulder); тамыгь ↔ дамыгъэ (stamp, letter); тыгъужъы ↔ дыгъужь (wolf); тыгъуас ↔ дыгъуасэ (yesterday); ты ↔ адэ (father); тыжьыны ↔ дыжьын (silver); такъикъ ↔ дакъикъэ (minute); атакъэ ↔ адакъэ (rooster, cock); хатэ ↔ хадэ (garden); псычэт ↔ псыджэд (duck); тхьаматэ ↔ тхьэмадэ (leader, boss)
п	б	панэ ↔ банэ (thorn); пытэ ↔ быдэ (hard); пчэны ↔ бжэн (goat); пыи ↔ бий (enemy); непэ ↔ нобэ (today); пчъын ↔ бжын (to count)
м	н	мамун ↔ номин (monkey)
н	Ø	гъунджэ ↔ гъуджэ (mirror)
-Ø	-р	Ӏехы ↔ Ӏехыр; сӀехы ↔ сӀехыр; тӀехы ↔ тӀехыр
-Ø	-щ	тӀыгъ ↔ тӀыгъщ
Ø-	и-	джыри ↔ иджыри (yet)

== Ergative–absolutive ==
The following example shows an ergative–absolutive case marking system while using the same verb "break" in both intransitive and transitive forms:

Ergative language
Sentence:	ӏанэр мэкъутэ.		Лӏым ӏанэр екъутэ.		
Word:	ӏанэ-р	мэкъутэ	Лӏы-м	ӏанэ-р	екъутэ
Gloss:	The table-ABS	breaks	The man-ERG	the table-ABS	breaks
Function:	S	VERB_{intrans}	A	O	VERB_{trans}
Translation:	"The table breaks."		"The man breaks the table."		

Here, "table" has the absolutive case mark -р /-r/ while "man" has the ergative case mark -м /-m/. The verb "break" is in the intransitive form "мэкъутэ" and the transitive form "екъутэ". The example above specifically shows SOV order, but Circassian allows any order.

== Loanwords ==
Circassian languages contain "many loan-words from Arabic, Turkish, Persian (particularly in the area of religion) and Russian".

== See also ==
- Circassia

== Sources ==
- Reza, Enayotallah; Hirtenstein, Stephen; Gholami, Rahim (2021). "Cherkess (Circassian)". In Madelung, Wilferd; Daftary, Farhad (eds.). Encyclopaedia Islamica Online. Brill Online. ISSN 1875-9831.

== Literature ==
- A Dictionary of the Circassian Language, in Two Parts. By Dr. L. Loewe.
- Кумахов М. А. Адыгские языки // Языки мира. Кавказские языки. М., 1999. (in Russian)
