= Bzhedug dialect =

Northwest Caucasian dialect

Bzhedug Adyghe
- Бжъэдыгъубзэ
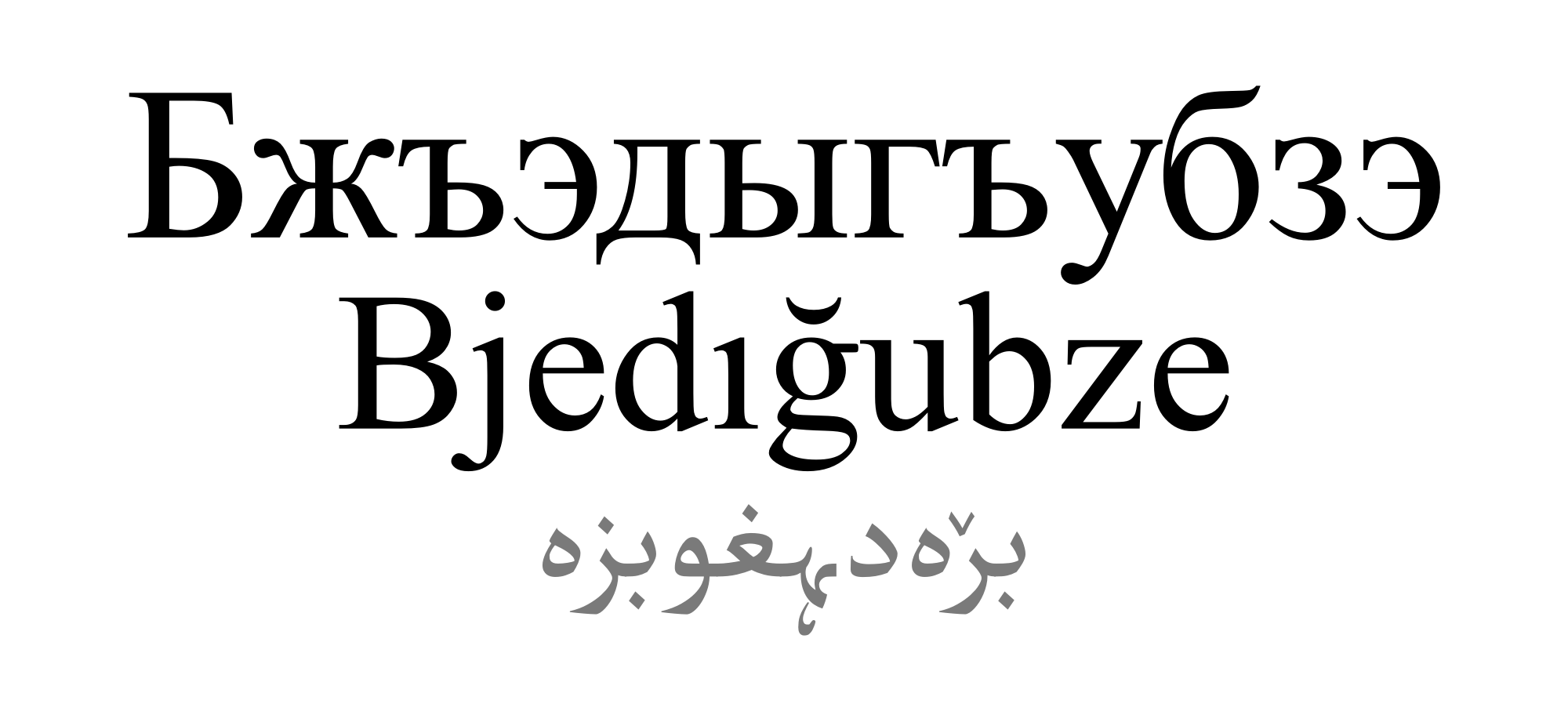
- "Bzhedug dialect" written in the Cyrillic, the ABX Latin and the now-defunct Perso-Arabic scripts.
- Native to: Russia, Turkey
- Region: Republic of Adygea, Biga
- Ethnicity: Bzhedugs
- Language family: Northwest Caucasian: Circassian; Adyghe; Bzhedug Adyghe

Language codes
- ISO 639-3: –
- Glottolog: bezh1247

The Bzhedug dialect (Adyghe: Бжъэдыгъубзэ) is a dialect of Adyghe. The Bzhedug dialect is spoken by the Bzhedugs who live mostly in Adygea and Biga.

== Phonology ==
=== Dropped consonants ===
In the Bzhedug dialect (as in the Northern Shapsug dialect) in some cases the consonants н [n], м [m] and р [r] are dropped and are not pronounced.

- The consonant м [m] is dropped before bilabial stops б [b], п [p], пI [pʼ] :

Meaning	Bzhedug		Standard Adyghe		Kabardian	
Meaning	Cyrillic	IPA	Cyrillic	IPA	Cyrillic	IPA
calm	сабыр	saːbər	самбыр	saːmbər	самбыр	saːmbər
Saturday	шэбэт	ʃabat	шэмбэт	ʃambat	щэбэт	ɕabat
finger	Iэхъуабэ	ʔaχʷaːba	Iэхъуамбэ	ʔaχʷaːmba	Iэпхъуамбэ	ʔapχʷaːmba
toe	лъэхъуабэ	ɬaχʷaːba	лъэхъуамбэ	ɬaχʷaːmba	лъэпхъуамбэ	ɬapχʷaːmba
wide	шъуабгъо	ʃʷaːbʁʷa	шъуамбгъо	ʃʷaːmbʁʷa	фабгъуэ	faːbʁʷa
peel	шъуапIэ	ʃʷaːpʼa	шъуампIэ	ʃʷaːmpʼa	фампIэ	faːmpʼa
board	пхъэбгъу	pχabʁʷ	пхъэмбгъу	pχambʁʷ	пхъэбгъу	pχabʁʷ
worm	хьэблыу	ħabləw	хьамлыу	ħaːmɮəw	хьэмбылыу	ħambəɮəw

- The consonant н [n] is dropped before postalveolar affricates дж [d͡ʒ], ч [t͡ʃ], кI [t͡ʃʼ] and before alveolar stops д [d], т [t], тI [tʼ] :

Meaning	Bzhedug		Standard Adyghe		Kabardian	
Meaning	Cyrillic	IPA	Cyrillic	IPA	Cyrillic	IPA
egg	кIэкIэ	t͡ʃʼat͡ʃʼa	кIэнкIэ	t͡ʃant͡ʃa	джэдыкӀэ	d͡ʒadət͡ʃʼa
sweat	пкIатIэ	pt͡ʃʼaːtʼa	пкIантIэ	pt͡ʃʼaːntʼa	пщIантIэ	pɕʼaːntʼa
flue pipe	оджэкъ	wad͡ʒaq	онджэкъ	wand͡ʒaq	уэнжакъ	wanžaq
rice	пыдж	pəd͡ʒ	пындж	pənd͡ʒ	пынжь	pənʑ
pillow	шъхьатэ	ʂħaːta	шъхьантэ	ʂħaːnta	щхьэнтэ	ɕħanta
pants	гъочэдж	ʁʷat͡ʃad͡ʒ	гъончэдж	ʁʷant͡ʃad͡ʒ	гъуэншэдж	ʁʷanʃad͡ʒ
fast	псыкIэ	psət͡ʃʼa	псынкIэ	psənt͡ʃʼa	псынщIэ	psənɕʼa
shovel	хьацэ	ħaːt͡sa	хьанцэ	ħaːnt͡sa	хьэнцэ	ħant͡sa
blue	шхъуатIэ	ʃχʷaːtʼa	шхъуантIэ	ʃχʷaːntʼa	шхъуантIэ	ʃχʷaːntʼa
key	IукIыбзэ	ʔʷət͡ʃʼəbza	IункIыбзэ	ʔʷənt͡ʃəbza	IункIыбзэ	ʔʷənt͡ʃəbza
vein	лъытфэ	ɬətfa	лъынтфэ	ɬəntfa	лъынтхуэ	ɬəntxʷa
heavy	отэгъу	wataʁʷ	онтэгъу	wantaʁʷ	уэндэгъу	wandaʁʷ
knee	лъэгуаджэ	ɬaɡʷaːd͡ʒa	лъэгуанджэ	ɬaɡʷaːnd͡ʒa	лъэгуажьэ	ɬaɡʷaːʑa
butterfly	хьапIырашъу	ħapˈəpaʃʷ]	хьампIырашъу	ħampˈəpaʃʷ]	хьэндырабгъуэ	ħandəraːbʁʷa
noise	жъот	ʒʷat	жъонт	ʒʷant		
peanuts	чIыдэ	t͡ʃʼəda	чIындэ	t͡ʃʼənda	щIыдэ	ɕʼəda
chair	пхъэтIэкIу	pχatʼakʷʼ	пхъэнтIэкIу	pχantʼakʷʼ	пхъэнтIэкIу	pχantʼakʷʼ

=== Aspirated consonants ===
The aspirated consonants originally existed in the Proto-Circassian language, which maintained a strict distinction between aspirated and tense variants of voiceless consonants. While these sounds were lost or shifted in most modern dialects, they successfully survived in the Shapsug, Bzhedug, and Hatuqay dialects.

In these dialects, there exists a series of aspirated consonants (/pʰ/ /tʰ/ /ʃʰ/ /t͡sʰ/ /t͡ʃʰ/ /t͡ʂʰ/ /t͡ɕʷʰ/ /kʲʰ/ /kʷʰ/ /qʰ/ /qʷʰ/) that became plain consonants in other dialects:

- Shapsug, Bzhedug & Hatuqay пʰ [pʰ] ↔ п [p] in other dialects :

Word	Adyghe (West Circassian)		Kabardian (East Circassian)
Word	Shapsug, Bzhedug & Hatuqay	Chemguy & Literary Standard and Abzakh	Kabardian (East Circassian)
sharp	пʰапцӏэ [pʰaːpt͡sʼa]	папцӏэ [paːpt͡sʼa]	папцӏэ [paːpsʼa / paːpt͡sʼa]
arrogant	пʰагэ [pʰaːɣa]	пагэ [paːɣa]	пагэ [paːɣa]
nose	пʰэ [pʰa]	пэ [pa]	пэ [pa]

- Shapsug, Bzhedug & Hatuqay тʰ [tʰ] ↔ т [t] in other dialects :

Word	Adyghe (West Circassian)		Kabardian (East Circassian)
Word	Shapsug, Bzhedug & Hatuqay	Chemguy & Literary Standard and Abzakh	Kabardian (East Circassian)
respect	пхъатʰэ [pχaːtʰa]	пхъатэ [pχaːta]	-
to give	етʰын [jatʰən]	етын [jatən]	етын [jatən]
to take	штʰэн [ʃtʰan]	штэн [ʃtan]	щтэн [ɕtan]
on	тʰет [tʰajt]	тет [tajt]	тет [tat]
smooth	цӏашъутʰэ [t͡sʼaːʂʷtʰa]	цӏашъутэ [t͡sʼaːʃʷta]	цӏафтэ [t͡sʼaːfta]
to afraid	щтʰэн [ɕtʰan]	щтэн [ɕtan]	щтэн [ɕtan]
pillow	шъхьантʰэ [ʂħaːntʰa]	шъхьантэ [ʂħaːnta]	щхьатэ [ɕħaːta]

- Shapsug, Bzhedug & Hatuqay цʰ [t͡sʰ] ↔ ц [t͡s] in other dialects :

Word	Adyghe (West Circassian)		Kabardian (East Circassian)
Word	Shapsug, Bzhedug & Hatuqay	Chemguy & Literary Standard and Abzakh	Kabardian (East Circassian)
wool	цʰы [t͡sʰə]	цы [t͡sə]	цы [t͡sə]
eyelash	нэбзыцʰ [nabzət͡sʰ]	нэбзыц [nabzət͡s]	-

- Shapsug, Bzhedug & Hatuqay шʰ [ʃʰ] ↔ щ [ɕ] in other Adyghe dialects :

Word	Adyghe (West Circassian)		Kabardian (East Circassian)
Word	Shapsug, Bzhedug & Hatuqay	Chemguy & Literary Standard and Abzakh	Kabardian (East Circassian)
milk	шʰэ [ʃʰa]	щэ [ɕa]	шэ [ʃa]
lame	лъашʰэ [ɬaːʃʰa]	лъащэ [ɬaːɕa]	лъашэ [ɬaːʃa]
salt	шʰыгъу [ʃʰəʁʷ]	щыгъу [ɕəʁʷ]	шыгъу [ʃəʁʷ]
cloud	пшʰэ [pʃʰa]	пщэ [pɕa]	пшэ [pʃa]
pus	шʰыны [ʃʰənə]	щыны [ɕənə]	шын [ʃən]
accordion	пшʰынэ [pʃʰəna]	пщынэ [pɕəna]	пшынэ [pʃəna]
fat	пшʰэры [pʃʰarə]	пщэры [pɕarə]	пшэр [pʃar]
wax	шʰэфы [ʃʰafə]	шэфы [ʃafə]	шэху [ʃaxʷə]
horse	шʰы [ʃʰə]	шы [ʃə]	шы [ʃə]
sand	пшʰахъо [pʃʰaːχʷa]	пшахъо [pʃaːχʷa]	пшахъуэ [pʃaːχʷa]
story	пшʰысэ [pʃʰəsa]	пшысэ [pʃəsa]	пшысэ [pʃəsa]

- Shapsug кьʰ [kʲʰ] ↔ ч [t͡ʃ] in other dialects (чʰ [t͡ʃʰ] in Bzhedug & Hatuqay) :

Word	Adyghe (West Circassian)			Kabardian (East Circassian)
Word	Shapsug	Bzhedug & Hatuqay	Chemguy & Literary Standard and Abzakh	Kabardian (East Circassian)
spleen	кьʰэ [kʲʰa]	чʰэ [t͡ʃʰa]	чэ [t͡ʃa]	чэ [t͡ʃa]
brushwood twig	кьʰы [kʲʰə]	чʰы [t͡ʃʰə]	чы [t͡ʃə]	чы [t͡ʃə]
to cough	пскьʰэн [pskʲʰan]	псчʰэн [pst͡ʃʰan]	псчэн [pst͡ʃan]	псчэн [pst͡ʃan]

- Shapsug, Bzhedug & Hatuqay кʰу [kʷʰ] ↔ ку [kʷ] in other dialects :

Word	Adyghe (West Circassian)		Kabardian (East Circassian)
Word	Shapsug, Bzhedug & Hatuqay	Chemguy & Literary Standard and Abzakh	Kabardian (East Circassian)
middle	кʰу [kʷʰə]	ку [kʷə]	ку [kʷə]
thigh	кʰо [kʷʰa]	ко [kʷa]	куэ [kʷa]

- Shapsug, Bzhedug & Hatuqay къʰ [qʰ] ↔ къ [q] in other Adyghe dialects. Note: In many Shapsug dialects (such as Kfar Kama), this became the fricative хъ [χ], while in Natukhai and Hatuqay it became the affricate кхъ [q͡χ].

Word	Adyghe (West Circassian)				Kabardian (East Circassian)
Word	Shapsug & Bzhedug	Other Shapsug dialects (like Kfar Kama)	Natukhaj & Hatuqay	Chemguy & Literary Standard and Abzakh	Kabardian (East Circassian)
grave	къʰэ [qʰa]	хъэ [χa]	кхъэ [q͡χa]	къэ [qa]	кхъэ [q͡χa]

- Shapsug, Bzhedug & Hatuqay къуʰ [qʷʰ] ↔ къу [qʷ] in other Adyghe dialects. Note: In Shapsug dialects, this became хъу [χʷ], while in Natukhai and Hatuqay it became кхъу [q͡χʷ].

Word	Adyghe (West Circassian)				Kabardian (East Circassian)
Word	Shapsug & Bzhedug	Other Shapsug dialects (like Kfar Kama)	Natukhaj & Hatuqay	Chemguy & Literary Standard and Abzakh	Kabardian (East Circassian)
pig	къʰо [qʷʰa]	хъо [χʷa]	кхъо [q͡χʷa]	къо [qʷa]	кхъуэ [q͡χʷa]
cheese	къʰуае [qʷʰaːja]	хъуае [χʷaːja]	кхъуае [q͡χʷaːja]	къуае [qʷaːja]	кхъуей [q͡χʷaj]
ship	къʰохь [qʷʰaħ]	хъохь [χʷaħ]	-	къухьэ [qʷəħa]	кхъухь [q͡χʷəħ]
to fart	къэкъʰун [qaqʷʰəʃʷən]	къэхъушъун [qʷaχʷəʃʷən]	-	къэкъушъун [qʷaqʷəʃʷən]	къэцыфын [qat͡səfən]
peer	къʰужъы [qʷʰəʐə]	къужъы [qʷəʐə]	-	къужъы [qʷəʐə]	кхъужьы [q͡χʷəʑə]

- Shapsug, Bzhedug & Hatuqay чъʰу [t͡ɕʷʰ] ↔ чу [t͡ʃʷ] (spelled цу) in Temirgoy:

Word	Adyghe (West Circassian)		Kabardian (East Circassian)
Word	Shapsug, Bzhedug & Hatuqay	Chemguy & Literary Standard	Kabardian (East Circassian)
jungle/bushy area	чъʰуны [t͡ɕʷʰənə]	цуны [t͡ʃʷənə]	фын [fən]

In Proto-Circassian, there was a clear distinction between aspirated and tense variants of voiceless consonants. The tense variants survived in western dialects like Shapsug, Hatuqay, Bzhedug, and Chemguy (Temirgoy). In linguistics literature, these tense consonants are often represented with a colon (e.g., tː) to denote gemination/tenseness, and in some Cyrillic orthographies, they are represented with double letters (e.g., пп, тт, цц) or with a colon (e.g., п:, т:, ц:).

In the eastern dialects (Besleney and Kabardian), the tense variants shifted and became voiced.

- pː ⟨п: / пп⟩ → b ⟨б⟩
- tː ⟨т: / тт⟩ → d ⟨д⟩
- t͡sː ⟨ц: / цц⟩ → d͡z ⟨дз⟩
- t͡ɕːʷ ⟨цу: / цуцу⟩ → v ⟨в⟩
- kːʲ ⟨кь: / кькь⟩ → ɡʲ ⟨гь⟩ / d͡ʒ ⟨дж⟩
- kːʷ ⟨ку: / куку⟩ → ɡʷ ⟨гу⟩
- t͡ʃː ⟨ч: / чч⟩ → d͡ʒ ⟨дж⟩ / ʒ ⟨ж⟩
- t͡ʂː ⟨чъ: / чъчъ⟩ → d͡ʐ ⟨джъ⟩ / ʒ ⟨ж⟩

Word	Proto-Circassian	Adyghe (West Circassian)		Kabardian (East Circassian)	
Word	Proto-Circassian	Shapsug	Bzhedug, Hatuqay, Chemguy & Literary Standard	Besleney	Standard Kabardian
Shift: tː → d
we	т:э [tːa]	т:э [tːa]	т:э [tːa]	дэ [da]	дэ [da]
leader	тхьэмат:э [tħamaːtːa]	тхьэмат:э [tħamaːtːa]	тхьэмат:э [tħamaːtːa]	тхьэмадэ [tħamaːda]	тхьэмадэ [tħamaːda]
Shift: t͡sː → d͡z
fish	пц:эжъые [pt͡sːaʐəja]	пц:эжъые [pt͡sːaʐəja]	пц:эжъые [pt͡sːaʐəja]	бдзэжьей [bd͡zaʑej]	бдзэжьей [bd͡zaʑej]
mouse	ц:ыгъо [t͡sːəʁʷa]	ц:ыгъо [t͡sːəʁʷa]	ц:ыгъо [t͡sːəʁʷa]	дзыгъуэ [d͡zəʁʷa]	дзыгъуэ [d͡zəʁʷa]
Shift: kːʲ → ɡʲ / d͡ʒ
glass	апкь: [aːpkːʲ]	апкь: [aːpkːʲ]	апч: [aːpt͡ʃː]	абгь [ʔaːbɡʲ]	абдж [ʔaːbd͡ʒ]
chicken	кь:эт [kːʲat]	кь:эт [kːʲat]	ч:эты [t͡ʃːatə]	гьэд [ɡʲad]	джэд [d͡ʒad]
Shift: t͡ʃː → d͡ʒ / ʒ
night	ч:эщ [t͡ʃːaɕ]	ч:эщы [t͡ʃːaɕə]	ч:эщы [t͡ʃːaɕə]	джэщ [d͡ʒaɕ]	жэщ [ʒaɕ]
village	ч:ылэ [t͡ʃːəɮa]	ч:ылэ [t͡ʃːəɮa]	ч:ылэ [t͡ʃːəɮa]	джылэ [d͡ʒəɮa]	жылэ [ʒəɮa]
cow	ч:эм [t͡ʃːam]	ч:эмы [t͡ʃːamə]	ч:эмы [t͡ʃːamə]	джэм [d͡ʒam]	жэм [ʒam]
Shift: t͡ʂː → d͡ʐ / ʒ
tree	чъ:ыг [t͡ʂːəɣ]	чъ:ыгы [t͡ʂːəɣə]	чъ:ыгы [t͡ʂːəɣə]	джъыг [d͡ʐəɣ]	жыг [ʒəɣ]
Shift: kːʷ → ɡʷ
short	кӏьак:о [kʲʼaːkːʷa]	кӏьак:о [kʲʼaːkːʷa]	кӏак:о [t͡ʃʼaːkːʷa]	кӏьагуэ [kʲʼaːɡʷa]	кӏагуэ [t͡ʃʼaːɡʷa]
wheat	к:оц [kːʷat͡s]	к:оцы [kːʷat͡sə]	к:оцы [kːʷat͡sə]	гуэдз [ɡʷad͡z]	гуэдз [ɡʷad͡z]

=== Phonological Shifts ===
The Voiceless velar fricative [x] becomes the aspirated Voiceless velar plosive [kʰ] (like English c in car, cup, cop, or curse) after the Voiceless postalveolar fricative [ʃ]. In this environment, the velar fricative undergoes hardening to become a plosive. This change only occurred in some Abzakh sub-dialects and in Bzhedug dialects. This should not be confused with the palatalized kʲ (like English c in camera, cannon, or cow).

Word	Shift	Adyghe				Kabardian	
Word	Shift	Abzakh / Bzhedug		Standard		Kabardian	
Word	Shift	IPA	Cyrillic	IPA	Cyrillic	IPA	Cyrillic
Rain	ʃx → ʃkʰ	waʃkʰ	ошк	waʃx	ошх	waʃx	уэшх
Rifle	ʃxʷ → ʃkʷ	ʃkʷant͡ʃʼ	шконч	ʃxʷant͡ʃʼ	шхонч	-	-
to eat	ʃx → ʃkʰ	ʃkʰan	шкэн	ʃxan	шхэн	ʃxan	шхэн
to laugh at	ʃx → ʃkʰ	daħa:ʃkʰən	дэхьащкын	daħa:ʃxən	дэхьащхын	daħa:ʃxən	дэхьащхын
enormous	ʃx → ʃkʷ	jənəʃkʷ	инышку	jənəʃxu	инышху	jənəʃxuə	инышхуэ
Almighty God	ʃx → ʃkʷ	tħa:ʃkʷ	тхьашку	tħa:ʃxu	тхьашху	tħəʃxuə	тхьэшхуэ
large room/house	ʃx → ʃkʷ	wənaʃkʷ	унэшку	wənaʃxu	унэшху	wənaʃxuə	унэшхуэ
festival	ʃx → ʃkʷ	mafaʃkʷ	мэфэшку	mafaʃxu	мэфэшху	ma:xʷaʃxuə	мэхуэшхуэ

=== Affrication to Fricatives ===
In the Bzhedugh, Hatuqay and Shapsug dialects, a specific consonant hardening process known as affrication occurs. During this process, softer "sh" sounds (palato-alveolar fricatives) harden into "ch" sounds (affricates) whenever they directly follow the sibilant consonants ⟨с⟩ [s] or ⟨шъу⟩ [ʃʷ].

To understand this, it helps to think of a similar unwritten sound change in English involving the letters dr and tr. Even though it isn't spelled this way, drink, drop, and dragon are naturally pronounced with a "j-r" sound instead of a hard "d-r". Similarly, tree, true, and trust are pronounced with a "ch-r" sound instead of a "t-r". In these Adyghe dialects, the combination of these specific consonants naturally hardens in speech in the exact same way.

Importantly, this sound change is not written, but is pronounced. Standard Adyghe spelling keeps the original letters, but speakers of these dialects will automatically pronounce the hardened versions.

Specifically, the following base letter changes take place:

- ⟨ш⟩ and ⟨щ⟩ harden into ⟨ч⟩.
- ⟨шъ⟩ hardens into ⟨чъ⟩.
- ⟨шӏ⟩ hardens into ⟨чӏ⟩.
- ⟨шъу⟩ hardens into ⟨чъу⟩.
- ⟨шӏу⟩ hardens into ⟨чӏу⟩.

Pronunciation Rules In grammar, this process is almost exclusively triggered when attaching the first-person singular prefix с- (I/me) or the second-person plural prefix шъу- (you all) to a word.

Here are all the possible combinations where this sound change occurs:

Affrication Combinations
Trigger	Base Consonant	Cyrillic Change	IPA Transformation
с- (I)	ш	сш → сч	[sʃ] → [st͡ʃ]
с- (I)	щ	сщ → сч	[sɕ] → [st͡ʃ]
с- (I)	шъ	сшъ → счъ	[sʂ] → [st͡ʂ]
с- (I)	шӏ	сшӏ → счӏ	[sʃʼ] → [sʈ͡ʂʼ]
с- (I)	шъу	сшъу → счъу	[sʃʷ] → [st͡ʂʷ]
с- (I)	шӏу	сшӏу → счӏу	[sʃʷʼ] → [sʈ͡ʂʷʼ]
шъу- (You pl.)	ш	шъуш → шъуч	[ʃʷʃ] → [ʃʷt͡ʃ]
шъу- (You pl.)	щ	шъущ → шъуч	[ʃʷɕ] → [ʃʷt͡ʃ]
шъу- (You pl.)	шъ	шъушъ → шъучъ	[ʃʷʂ] → [ʃʷt͡ʂ]
шъу- (You pl.)	шӏ	шъушӏ → шъучӏ	[ʃʷʃʼ] → [ʃʷʈ͡ʂʼ]
шъу- (You pl.)	шъу	шъушъу → шъучъу	[ʃʷʃʷ] → [ʃʷt͡ʂʷ]
шъу- (You pl.)	шӏу	шъушӏу → шъучӏу	[ʃʷʃʷʼ] → [ʃʷʈ͡ʂʷʼ]

When the change occurs The change only happens when the triggering prefix directly touches the affected consonant.

Example	Explanation
сшӏагъ → счӏагъ	The sound changes because the prefix с- comes directly before шӏ.
сшӏэрэп → счӏэрэп	The sound changes because the prefix с- comes directly before шӏ.
шъушӏагъ → шъучӏагъ	The sound changes because the prefix шъу- comes directly before шӏ.

When the change does NOT occur If there is a vowel in between the letters, or if a different consonant prefix is used, the sound does not harden.

Example	Explanation
сэшӏэ	No change. There is a vowel (э) separating the с and шӏ, preventing the sounds from interacting.
пшӏагъ	No change. The prefix is п-, which does not trigger the hardening.
ушӏагъ	No change. The prefix is у-, which does not trigger the hardening.
тшӏагъ	No change. The prefix is т-, which does not trigger the hardening.

Comprehensive Examples Below are extensive examples comparing the standard orthography with the spoken affrication in the Bzhedugh, Hatuqay and Shapsug dialects, demonstrating both the 1st Person Singular (с-) and 2nd Person Plural (шъу-) grammatical forms.

Examples of Affrication by Dialect
Meaning	Pronoun	Letter Change	Standard Adyghe (Base Form)	Bzhedugh, Hatuqay & Shapsug (Affricated Pronunciation)
I sealed it	I	сшъ → счъ	сшъыбыгъ	→ счъыбыгъ
You (pl.) sealed it	You (pl.)	шъушъ → шъучъ	шъушъыбыгъ	→ шъучъыбыгъ
I took (him/her to); I brought (him/her here; married)	I	сщ → сч	сщагъ къэсщагъ	→ счагъ къэсчагъ
You (pl.) took (him/her to); You (pl.) brought (him/her here)	You (pl.)	шъущ → шъуч	шъущагъ къэшъущагъ	→ шъучагъ къэшъучагъ
I bought I bought (dir.)	I	сщ → сч	сщэфыгъ къэсщэфыгъ	→ счэфыгъ къэсчэфыгъ
You (pl.) bought You (pl.) bought (dir.)	You (pl.)	шъущ → шъуч	шъущэфыгъ къэшъущэфыгъ	→ шъучэфыгъ къэшъучэфыгъ
I forgot I forgot (dir.)	I	сщ → сч	сщыгъупшыгъ къэсщыгъупшыгъ	→ счыгъупшыгъ къэсчыгъупшыгъ
You (pl.) forgot You (pl.) forgot (dir.)	You (pl.)	шъущ → шъуч	шъущыгъупшыгъ къэшъущыгъупшыгъ	→ шъучыгъупшыгъ къэшъучыгъупшыгъ
I don't know I don't know (dir.)	I	сшӏ → счӏ	сшӏэрэп къэсшӏэрэп	→ счӏэрэп къэсчӏэрэп
You (pl.) don't know You (pl.) don't know (dir.)	You (pl.)	шъушӏ → шъучӏ	шъушӏэрэп къэшъушӏэрэп	→ шъучӏэрэп къэшъучӏэрэп
I knew I knew (dir.)	I	сшӏ → счӏ	сшӏагъ къэсшӏагъ	→ счӏагъ къэсчӏагъ
You (pl.) knew You (pl.) knew (dir.)	You (pl.)	шъушӏ → шъучӏ	шъушӏагъ къэшъушӏагъ	→ шъучӏагъ къэшъучӏагъ
I thought I thought (dir.)	I	сшӏ → счӏ	сшӏошӏыгъ къэсшӏошӏыгъ	→ счӏошӏыгъ къэсчӏошӏыгъ
You (pl.) thought You (pl.) thought (dir.)	You (pl.)	шъушӏ → шъучӏ	шъушӏошӏыгъ къэшъушӏошӏыгъ	→ шъучӏошӏыгъ къэшъучӏошӏыгъ
It fits me It fits me (dir.)	I	сщ → сч	сщэфэ къэсщэфэ	→ счэфэ къэсчэфэ
It fits you (pl.); It fits you (pl.) (dir.)	You (pl.)	шъущ → шъуч	шъущэфэ къэшъущэфэ	→ шъучэфэ къэшъучэфэ
I laughed at him/her	I	сщ → сч	сщыгушӏукӏыгъ	→ счыгушӏукӏыгъ
You (pl.) laughed at him/her	You (pl.)	шъущ → шъуч	шъущыгушӏукӏыгъ	→ шъучыгушӏукӏыгъ

== Grammar ==
=== Noun instrumental case ===
In the instrumental case the noun has the suffix мджэ (-md͡ʒa) or -джэ (-d͡ʒa) unlike other dialects (e.g. Abzakh, Temirgoy and Standard Kabardian) that has the suffix -мкIэ (-mt͡ʃʼa) or -кIэ (-t͡ʃʼa) :

- Bzhedug dialect: КIалэр Адыгэбзэджэ мэгущаIэ ↔ Standard: КIалэр АдыгэбзэкIэ мэгущыIэ – "The boy speaks (using) Adyghe language".
- Bzhedug dialect: Къэлэмымджэ сэтхэ ↔ Standard: КъэлэмымкIэ сэтхэ – "I write (using) with the pencil".

=== Future tense Suffix ~т (~t) ===
In this dialect the future tense suffix is ~эт (~at) and in some cases ~ыт (~ət) unlike standard Adyghe (Temirgoy) that has the Suffix ~щт (~ɕt).

Word	Adyghe				Standard Kabardian	
Word	Standard Adyghe		Bzhedug		Standard Kabardian	
Word	IPA	Cyrillic	IPA	Cyrillic	IPA	Cyrillic
I will go	səkʷʼaɕt	сыкIощт	səkʷʼat	сыкIот	səkʷʼanəwɕ	сыкIуэнущ
you will go	wəkʷʼaɕt	укIощт	wəkʷʼat	укIот	wəkʷʼanəwɕ	укIуэнущ
he will go	makʷʼaɕt	мэкIощт	makʷʼat	мэкIот	makʷʼanəwɕ	мэкIуэнущ
we will go	təkʷʼaɕt	тыкIощт	ʂʷəkʷʼat	тыкIот	dəkʷʼanəwɕ	дыкIуэнущ
you (plural) will go	ʃʷəkʷaɕt	шъукIощт	ʃʷəkʷʼat	шъукIот	fəkʷʼanəwɕ	фыкIуэнущ
they will go	maːkʷatəɕx	макIощтых	maːkʷʼatəx	макIотых	jaːkʷʼanəwɕ	якIуэнущ

=== Demonstratives ===
Adyghe has three main demonstratives to indicate spatial proximity and visibility, which frequently act as determiners or prefixes attached to nouns, verbs, or adverbs:

- а- – That (invisible or out of the speaker's line of sight)
- мо- – That (visible to the speaker)
- мы- – This (close proximity to the speaker)

In the Shapsug, Bzhedugh, and Hatuqai dialects, the standard visible demonstrative мо- is replaced by a different prefix. Additionally, these dialects use a different locative suffix (-у or -уджэ) compared to the standard Adyghe -кӀэ.

- Shapsug: The visible demonstrative prefix is pronounced as a labial glide [w]. In Cyrillic, this is represented by a vowel shift (e.g., forming оу).
- Bzhedugh & Hatuqai: The visible demonstrative shifted and is pronounced as a glottal fricative [h]. Because the standard Adyghe Cyrillic alphabet lacks an official letter for this specific "h" sound, the digraph хӀ (using the Cyrillic palochka) is used in the orthography to replace the standard мо-.

The following table illustrates the general locative forms derived from these demonstratives. Note that the locative suffix -у remains consistent across the dialects; only the visible demonstrative prefix changes:

Word	Shapsug		Bzhedugh & Hatuqai		Standard Adyghe	
Word	IPA	Cyrillic	IPA	Cyrillic	IPA	Cyrillic
here	məw, məwd͡ʒa	мыу, мыуджэ	məw, məwd͡ʒa	мыу, мыуджэ	mət͡ʃʼa	мыкӀэ
there (visible)	waw, wawd͡ʒa	оу, оуджэ	how, howd͡ʒa	хӀоу, хӀоуджэ	mot͡ʃʼa	мокӀэ
there (invisible)	aːw, aːwd͡ʒa	ау, ауджэ	aːw, aːwd͡ʒa	ау, ауджэ	aːt͡ʃʼa	акӀэ
there (emphasis)	d͡ʒaw, d͡ʒawd͡ʒa	джэу, джэуджэ	d͡ʒaw, d͡ʒawd͡ʒa	джэу, джэуджэ	d͡ʒət͡ʃʼa	джэкӀэ
where	taw, tawd͡ʒa	тэу, тэуджэ	taw, tawd͡ʒa	тэу, тэуджэ	tət͡ʃʼa	тэкӀэ

==== Usage with Nouns ====
When modifying nouns, these demonstratives precede the noun to indicate its spatial relationship and visibility to the speaker. For example, using the noun кӀалэ (boy) in Bzhedugh and Hatuqai:

- а кӀалэ – that boy (invisible or out of sight)
- хӀо кӀалэ – that boy (visible); that boy over there
- мы кӀалэ – this boy

==== Usage as Prefixes ====
To demonstrate how this visible demonstrative functions as a bound prefix, the base хӀо- attaches directly to various roots and suffixes in Bzhedugh and Hatuqai to form demonstrative pronouns, adverbs of time, and manner (acting as the direct equivalent to the standard мо-):

- хӀодэ – there
- хӀоры – that's it; there he is
- хӀоу – there
- хӀоущтэу – like that
- хӀощгъум – then

The following table illustrates these derivations across dialects:

Meaning	Bzhedugh & Hatuqai		Standard Adyghe		Standard Kabardian	
Meaning	Cyrillic	IPA	Cyrillic	IPA	Cyrillic	IPA
that (abs.)	хӀор	hawr	мор	mawr	мор	mawr
that (erg.)	хӀой	hawj	мощ	mawɕ	мобы	mawbə
using that	хӀощджэ	hawɕd͡ʒa	мощкӀэ	mawɕt͡ʃʼa	-	-
like that	хӀоущтэу	hawɕtaw	моущтэу	mawɕtaw	мопхуэдэу	mawpxʷadaw
that is it	хӀоры	hawrə	моры	mawrə	мораш	mawraːɕ
there	хӀодэ	hawda	модэ	mawda	модэ	mawda
there (locative)	хӀоу	haw	моу	maw	-	-
the other	хӀодрэ	hawdra	модрэ	mawdra	модрэ	mawdra
then	хӀощгъум	hawɕʁʷəm	мощгъум	mawɕʁʷəm	-	-
like that (similar)	хӀощфэд	hawɕfad	мощфэд	mawɕfad	мопхуэд	mawpxʷad

=== Present participles ===
In standard Adyghe, present participles (often functioning equivalently to gerunds) decline using standard nominal case suffixes. However, the Shapsug, Bzhedugh, and Hatuqai dialects feature a distinct phonological elision in the absolutive case, where the final absolutive suffix -р (-r) is not pronounced.

Consequently, absolutive present participles in these dialects end simply in -рэ instead of the standard -рэр. For example, the standard Adyghe phrase кӀалэу кӀорэр ("the boy who is going") is realized in these dialects as кӀалэу кӀорэ.

Present Participle Declension (e.g., кӀон - "to go")
Case	Standard Adyghe	Shapsug, Bzhedugh & Hatuqai
Absolutive	кӀорэр	кӀорэ
Ergative / Oblique	кӀорэм	кӀорэм
Instrumental	кӀорэмкӀэ	кӀорэмджэ

=== Location ===
Adyghe demonstratives mark three degrees of deixis: proximal мы- ("this; here"), medial мо- ("that; there", in view), and distal а- ("that; there", out of view). Standard Adyghe derives adverbs of place from these roots with two series, named here by their distal forms акӀэ and адэ — e.g. proximal мыкӀэ~мыдэ "here", medial мокӀэ~модэ "(over) there", distal акӀэ~адэ "yonder".

Many dialects, among them Shapsug, Bzhedugh and part of Abzakh, lack the акӀэ series altogether; in its place they use four series — адэ, а тӀэкӀум (with the postposition тӀэкӀу(м) "a bit, a spot"), ау and аукӀэ. Two regular correspondences distinguish these western dialects. In the аукӀэ series the final element — Standard -кӀэ /-t͡ʃʼa/ — surfaces as -гьэ /-ɡʲa/ in Shapsug (аугьэ) and as -джэ /-d͡ʒa/ in Bzhedugh (ауджэ). Second, the medial root мо- is reduced to о- /wa-/ in both Shapsug and Bzhedugh (модэ, моу → одэ, оу). Bzhedugh and the Hatuqay subdialect behave identically and are shown together.

Meaning	Series	Variety			
Meaning	Series	Standard Adyghe	Shapsug	Bzhedugh / Hatuqay	Abzakh (some)
here (мы-/мэ-)	акӀэ	мыкӀэ /mət͡ʃʼa/	—		
here (мы-/мэ-)	адэ	мыдэ /məda/	мыдэ /məda/	мыдэ /məda/	мыдэ /məda/
here (мы-/мэ-)	а тӀэкӀум	—	мы тӀэкӀум /mə tʼakʷʼəm/	мы тӀэкӀум /mə tʼakʷʼəm/	мы тӀэкӀум /mə tʼakʷʼəm/
here (мы-/мэ-)	ау	—	мэу /maw/	мэу /maw/	мэу /maw/
here (мы-/мэ-)	аукӀэ	—	мэугьэ /mawɡʲa/	мэуджэ /mawd͡ʒa/	мэукӀэ /mawt͡ʃʼa/
there, visible (мо-/о-)	акӀэ	мокӀэ /mot͡ʃʼa/	—		
there, visible (мо-/о-)	адэ	модэ /moda/	одэ /wada/	одэ /wada/	модэ /moda/
there, visible (мо-/о-)	а тӀэкӀум	—	о тӀэкӀум /wa tʼakʷʼəm/	о тӀэкӀум /wa tʼakʷʼəm/	мо тӀэкӀум /mo tʼakʷʼəm/
there, visible (мо-/о-)	ау	—	оу /waw/	оу /waw/	моу /mow/
there, visible (мо-/о-)	аукӀэ	—	оугьэ /wawɡʲa/	оуджэ /wawd͡ʒa/	моукӀэ /mowt͡ʃʼa/
there, out of sight (а-)	акӀэ	акӀэ /aːt͡ʃʼa/	—		
there, out of sight (а-)	адэ	адэ /aːda/	адэ /aːda/	адэ /aːda/	адэ /aːda/
there, out of sight (а-)	а тӀэкӀум	—	а тӀэкӀум /aː tʼakʷʼəm/	а тӀэкӀум /aː tʼakʷʼəm/	а тӀэкӀум /aː tʼakʷʼəm/
there, out of sight (а-)	ау	—	ау /aːw/	ау /aːw/	ау /aːw/
there, out of sight (а-)	аукӀэ	—	аугьэ /aːwɡʲa/	ауджэ /aːwd͡ʒa/	аукӀэ /aːwt͡ʃʼa/

The interrogative тэ- "where" and the emphatic demonstrative (Standard джэ-, Shapsug гьэ-) take the same series: Standard тэкӀэ and джэкӀэ correspond to Shapsug тэу~тэугьэ and гьэу~гьэугьэ.

== Vocabulary ==
=== Unique words ===
Word	Adyghe				Standard Kabardian	
Word	Standard Adyghe		Bzhedug		Standard Kabardian	
Word	IPA	Cyrillic	IPA	Cyrillic	IPA	Cyrillic
what	səd	сыд	ʂəd	шъыд	sət	сыт
how	sədaw	сыдэу	ʂədaw	шъыдэу	dawə	дауэ
why	sədaː	сыда	ʂədaː	шъыда	сыт щхьэкIэ	sət ɕħat͡ʃʼa
when	sədəjʁwa	сыдигъо	ʂədəjʁwa	шъыдигъо	сыт щыгъуи	sət ɕəʁʷəj
how much	səd fadəjz	сыд фэдиз	ʂədfadəjz	шъыд фэдиз	sət xuadəjz	сыт хуэдиз
with what	sədt͡ʃʼa	сыдкIэ	ʂədd͡ʒa	шъыдджэ		
he/she/it	aɕ	ащ	aj	ай	abə	абы
this/here	məɕ	мыщ	məj	мый	məbə	мыбы
near	daʑ	дэжь	daj	дэй	dajʒ	деж
self	jaʑ	ежь	jaj	ей	jazə	езы

== Sample text ==
The North Wind and the Sun, written in Bzhedug:

Bzhedug	Translation
Зэгорэм тыгъэжьымрэ тыгъэмрэ зынэкъокъугъэх анахь лъэшыр язэрымгъашIэу. А лъэхъан дэдэм тефэу зекIогорэ кIакIо техъуагъэу гъогум къэрыкIоу алъэгъугъ ыкIи рахъухьагъ тIумэ язэу гъогурыкIом икIакIо зыщэзгъэхэрыр анахь лъэшэу алъытэнэу. Ай дэй тыгъэжьым зэрыфэлъэкIэу къэпщэу къыригъэжьагъ. Ау ар нахь лъэшэу къепщы къэсми, гъогурыкIом кIакIом нахь зыкIоцIищахьытыгъэ. Ыужыпкъэм тыгъежьыр иморад ыужы икIыжьын фае хъугъэ.ЕтIуанэ тыгъэр къэпсыгъ, гъогурыкIор фабэ къэпагъ, ыкIи ай лъэпэтэу кIакIор зыщихыгъ. Аущтэу тыгъэжьым тыгъэр ей нахьыри нахьы зэрылъэшыр къэгурымэIомэ мэхъонэу хъугъэ.	The North Wind and the Sun were disputing which was the stronger, when a traveler came along wrapped in a warm cloak.They agreed that the one who first succeeded in making the traveler take his cloak off should be considered stronger than the other. Then the North Wind blew as hard as he could, but the more he blew the more closely did the traveler fold his cloak around him; and at last the North Wind gave up the attempt. Then the Sun shined out warmly, and immediately the traveler took off his cloak. And so the North Wind was obliged to confess that the Sun was the stronger of the two.

== See also ==
- Hakuchi dialect
- Hatuqay dialect
- Shapsug dialect
- Abzakh dialect
- Baslaney dialect

== Source ==
- Sitimova, S. S. (2004). Бжедугский диалект в адыгейском языковом мире [The Bzhedug Dialect in the Adyghe Language World] (in Russian). Maykop: OOO "Kachestvo". ISBN 5-901701-51-8.
