= Proto-Circassian language =

Reconstructed ancestor of the Circassian languages

Proto-Circassian
- Proto-Adyghe–Kabardian
- Reconstruction of: Circassian languages
- Reconstructed ancestor: Proto-Northwest Caucasian
- Lower-order reconstructions: Proto-Kabardian

Proto-Circassian (or Proto-Adyghe–Kabardian) is the reconstructed common ancestor of the Adyghean and Kabardian languages.

== Phonology ==
- Proto‑Circassian
  - Proto-East Circassian
    - Kabardian
    - Besleney
  - Proto‑West Circassian
    - Kuban river
      - Chemguy
      - Abzakh
      - Bzhedugh
      - Hatuqay
    - Black Sea coast
      - Shapsug
      - Natukhaj

A Circassian dialects family tree.

Note on Orthography: This article employs Cyrillic characters alongside IPA to assist readers familiar with the Circassian alphabet. However, standard Adyghe orthography contains inconsistencies; notably, the digraph кӀ represents the sound [t͡ʃʼ] despite visually suggesting a velar ejective [kʼ]. To ensure phonetic precision, this article utilizes the following distinctions: чӀ for [t͡ʃʼ], чӀъ for [ʈʂʼ], and кӀь for [kʲʼ].

Orthographic Convention
This article uses specific Cyrillic notation to resolve ambiguities in the standard alphabet:
чӀ	[t͡ʃʼ] (Standard кӀ)
чӀъ	[ʈʂʼ] (Retroflex)
кӀь	[kʲʼ] (Palatalized velar)

=== Consonants ===
The consonant system is reconstructed with a four-way phonation contrast in stops and affricates, and a two-way contrast in fricatives.

==== Shifts ====
The following table shows how Proto-Circassian consonants diverged and evolved in the Western and Eastern dialects.

Proto- Circassian	Western Circassian (Adyghe)				Eastern Circassian (Kabardian)	
Proto- Circassian	Shapsug	Bzhedug	Chemguy	Abzakh	Besleney	Kabardian
b б	b б				b б	
p п	p п				b б	
pʰ пʰ	pʰ пʰ		p п		p п	
pʼ пӀ	pʼ пӀ				pʼ пӀ	
d д	d д				d д	
t т	t т				d д	
tʰ тʰ	tʰ тʰ		t т		t т	
tʼ тӀ	tʼ тӀ				tʼ тӀ	
ɡʲ гь	ɡʲ гь	d͡ʒ дж			ɡʲ гь	d͡ʒ дж (ɡʲ гь in some dialects)
kʲ кь	kʲ кь	t͡ʃ ч			ɡʲ гь	d͡ʒ дж (ɡʲ гь in some dialects)
kʲʰ кʰь	kʲʰ кʰь	t͡ʃʰ чʰ	t͡ʃ ч		kʲ кь	t͡ʃ ч (kʲ кь in some dialects)
kʲʼ кӀь	kʲʼ кӀь	t͡ʃʼ чӀ			kʲʼ кӀь	t͡ʃʼ чӀ (kʲʼ кӀь in some dialects)
ɡʷ гу	ɡʷ гу				ɡʷ гу	
kʷ ку	kʷ ку				ɡʷ гу	
kʷʰ кʰу	kʷʰ кʰу		kʷ ку		kʷ ку	
kʷʼ кӀу	kʷʼ кӀу				kʷʼ кӀу	
q къ	q къ				q къ	
qʰ кʰъ	qʰ кʰъ		q къ		q͡χ кхъ	
qʷ къу	qʷ къу				qʷ къу	
qʷʰ кʰъу	qʷʰ кʰъу		qʷ къу		q͡χʷ кхъу	
Proto- Circassian	Western Circassian				Eastern Circassian	
Proto- Circassian	Shapsug	Bzhedug	Chemguy	Abzakh	Besleney	Kabardian
d͡z дз	d͡z дз				d͡z дз	
t͡s ц	t͡s ц				d͡z дз	
t͡sʰ цʰ	t͡sʰ цʰ		t͡s ц		t͡s ц	
t͡sʼ цӀ	t͡sʼ / sʼ цӀ / сӀ	t͡sʼ цӀ			t͡sʼ цӀ	
d͡ʐʷ джъу	d͡ʐʷ джъу				v в	
t͡ʂʷ чъу	t͡ʂʷ чъу				v в	
t͡ɕʷʰ чъʰу	t͡ʂʷʰ чъʰу		t͡ʂʷ чъу		f ф	
d͡ʒ дж	d͡ʒ дж			ʒ ж	d͡ʒ дж	ʒ ж
t͡ʃ ч	t͡ʃ ч			ʃ ш	d͡ʒ дж	ʒ ж
t͡ʂ чъ	t͡ʃ ч	t͡ʂ чъ		ʂ шъ	d͡ʐ джъ	ʒ ж
t͡ʃʰ чʰ	ʃʰ шʰ		ʃ ш		t͡ʃ ч	ʃ ш
t͡ʂʰ чʰъ	ʃʰ шʰ		ʃ ш		t͡ʂ чъ	ʃ ш
t͡ʃʼ чӀ	t͡ʃʼ чӀ			ɕʼ / ʔʲ щӀ / Ӏ	t͡ʃʼ чӀ	ɕʼ щӀ
t͡ʂʼ чӀъ	t͡ʃʼ чӀ	t͡ʂʼ чӀъ		ɕʼ / ʔʲ щӀ / Ӏ	t͡ʂʼ чӀъ	ɕʼ щӀ
Proto- Circassian	Western Circassian				Eastern Circassian	
Proto- Circassian	Shapsug	Bzhedug	Chemguy	Abzakh	Besleney	Kabardian
z з	z з				z з	
s с	s с				s с	
ʑ жь	ʒ ж	ʑ жь			ʑ жь	
ɕ щ	ʃ ш	ɕ щ			ɕ щ	
ɕʼ шӀ	ʃʼ шӀ				ɕʼ щӀ	
ʐʷ жъу	ʑʷ жьу	ʐʷ жъу			v в	
ʂʷ шъу	ɕʷ щу	ʂʷ шъу			f ф	
ʂʷʼ шӀу	ʂʷʼ шӀу				fʼ фӀ	
ʒ ж	ʒ ж				ʒ ж	ʑ жь
ʐ жъ	ʐ жъ				ʐ жъ	ʑ жь
ʃ ш	ʃ ш				ʃ ш	ɕ щ
ʂ шъ	ʂ шъ				ʂ шъ	ɕ щ
ʃʰ шʰ	ʃʰ шʰ		ʃ ш		ʃ ш	ɕ щ
ʂʰ шʰъ	ʃʰ шʰ		ʃ ш		ʂ шъ	ɕ щ
Proto- Circassian	Western Circassian				Eastern Circassian	
Proto- Circassian	Shapsug	Bzhedug	Chemguy	Abzakh	Besleney	Kabardian
ɮ л	ɮ л				ɮ л	
ɬ лъ	ɬ лъ				ɬ лъ	
ɬʼ лӀ	ɬʼ лӀ				ɬʼ лӀ	
ɣ г	ɣ г				ɣ г	
x х	x х				x х	
xʷ ху	f ф				xʷ ху	
ʁ гъ	ʁ гъ				ʁ гъ	
ʁʷ гъу	ʁʷ гъу				ʁʷ гъу	
χ хъ	χ хъ				χ хъ	
χʷ хъу	χʷ хъу				χʷ хъу	
ħ хь	ħ хь				ħ хь	
m м	m м				m м	
n н	n н				n н	
r р	r р				r р	
w у	w у				w у	
j й	j й				j й	
ʔ Ӏ	ʔ Ӏ				ʔ Ӏ	
ʔʷ Ӏу	ʔʷ Ӏу				ʔʷ Ӏу	

=== Specific Shifts ===
==== Aspirated, plain and tense consonants ====
In Proto-Circassian each voiceless obstruent could appear in up to three manners: an aspirated (lax) variant, a plain variant, and a tense (geminate) variant.

The aspirated series survived in the Shapsug and Bzhedug dialects, while it became plain in the other dialects (Abzakh, Chemgui, Kabardian).

The tense series survived in the western dialects (Shapsug, Hatuqay, Bzhedug), merged into plain voiceless consonants in Chemgui (Temirgoy), and became voiced in the eastern dialects (Besleney and Kabardian). In linguistics literature the tense consonants are often written with a colon (e.g. tː) to denote gemination/tenseness, and in some Cyrillic orthographies with double letters (e.g. пп, тт, цц) or a colon (e.g. п:, т:, ц:).

In the tables below, dialects are grouped under West Circassian (Shapsug, Bzhedugh & Hatuqay, Chemgui, Abzakh) and East Circassian (Besleney where attested, and Kabardian). Bzhedugh and Hatuqay share a single column. The subsections group each consonant's aspirated and tense reflexes together.

===== Bilabial p =====
Aspirated: pʰ ⟨пʰ⟩ → p ⟨п⟩

Tense: pː ⟨п: / пп⟩ → b ⟨б⟩

Word	Proto-Circassian	West Circassian				Kabardian
Word	Proto-Circassian	Shapsug	Bzhedugh & Hatuqay	Chemgui	Abzakh	Kabardian
Shift: pʰ → p
noise	пʰэ [pʰa]	пʰэ [pʰa]	пʰэ [pʰa]	пэ [pa]	пэ [pa]	пэ [pa]
sharp	пʰапсӀэ [pʰaːpsʼa]	пʰапсӀэ [pʰaːpsʼa]	пʰапцӀэ [paːpt͡sʼa]	папцӀэ [paːpt͡sʼa]	папцӀэ [paːpt͡sʼa]	папцӀэ [paːpt͡sʼa]
arrogant	пʰагэ [pʰaːɣa]	пʰагэ [pʰaːɣa]	пʰагэ [pʰaːɣa]	пагэ [paːɣa]	пагэ [paːɣa]	пагэ [paːɣa]
nose	пʰэ [pʰa]	пʰэ [pʰa]	пʰэ [pʰa]	пэ [pa]	пэ [pa]	пэ [pa]
hedgehog	пʰыжьэ [pʰəźa]	пʰыжьэ [pʰəźa]	пʰыжьэ [pʰəźa]	пыжьэ [pəźa]	пыжьэ [pəźa]	пэжь [paź]
pleasure	гӀуапʰэ [ɡʷapʰa]	гӀуапʰэ [ɡʷapʰa]	гӀуапэ [ɡʷapa]	гӀуапэ [ɡʷapa]	гӀуапэ [ɡʷapa]	гӀуапэ [ɡʷapa]

Word	Proto-Circassian	West Circassian				Kabardian
Word	Proto-Circassian	Shapsug	Bzhedugh & Hatuqay	Chemgui	Abzakh	Kabardian
Shift: pː → b
thorn (bush)	п:анэ [pːaːna]	п:анэ [pːaːna]	п:анэ [pːaːna]	панэ [paːna]	панэ [paːna]	банэ [baːna]
strong, solid	п:ытэ [pːətă]	п:ытэ [pːətă]	п:ытэ [pːətă]	пытэ [pətă]	пытэ [pətă]	быдэ [bədă]
steam	п:ахэ [pːaxă]	п:ахэ [pːaxă]	п:ахэ [pːaxă]	пахэ [paxă]	пахэ [paxă]	бахэ [baxă]

===== Dental t =====
Aspirated: tʰ ⟨тʰ⟩ → t ⟨т⟩

Tense: tː ⟨т: / тт⟩ → d ⟨д⟩

Word	Proto-Circassian	West Circassian				Kabardian
Word	Proto-Circassian	Shapsug	Bzhedugh & Hatuqay	Chemgui	Abzakh	Kabardian
Shift: tʰ → t
respect	пхъатʰэ [pχaːtʰa]	пхъатʰэ [pχaːtʰa]	пхъатʰэ [pχaːtʰa]	пхъатэ [pχaːta]	пхъатэ [pχaːta]	—
to give	етʰын [jatʰən]	етʰын [jatʰən]	етʰын [jatʰən]	етын [jatən]	етын [jatən]	етын [jatən]
to take	штʰэн [ʃtʰan]	штʰэн [ʃtʰan]	штʰэн [ʃtʰan]	штэн [ʃtan]	штэн [ʃtan]	щтэн [ɕtan]
on	тʰет [tʰajt]	тʰет [tʰajt]	тʰет [tʰajt]	тет [tajt]	тет [tajt]	тет [tat]
smooth	цӀашъутʰэ [t͡sʼaːʂʷtʰa]	цӀашъутʰэ [t͡sʼaːʂʷtʰa]	цӀашъутʰэ [t͡sʼaːʂʷtʰa]	цӀашъутэ [t͡sʼaːʃʷta]	цӀашъутэ [t͡sʼaːʃʷta]	цӀафтэ [t͡sʼaːfta]
to be afraid	щтʰэн [ɕtʰan]	щтʰэн [ɕtʰan]	щтʰэн [ɕtʰan]	щтэн [ɕtan]	щтэн [ɕtan]	щтэн [ɕtan]
pillow	шъхьантʰэ [ʂħaːntʰa]	шъхьантʰэ [ʂħaːntʰa]	шъхьатʰэ [ʂħaːtʰa]	шъхьантэ [ʂħaːnta]	шъхьантэ [ʂħaːnta]	щхьантэ [ɕħaːnta]
basket	матʰэ [maːtʰa]	матʰэ [maːtʰa]	матʰэ [maːtʰa]	матэ [maːta]	матэ [maːta]	матэ [maːta]

Word	Proto-Circassian	West Circassian				Kabardian
Word	Proto-Circassian	Shapsug	Bzhedugh & Hatuqay	Chemgui	Abzakh	Kabardian
Shift: tː → d
we	т:э [tːa]	т:э [tːa]	т:э [tːa]	тэ [ta]	тэ [ta]	дэ [da]
leader	тхьэмат:э [tħamaːtːa]	тхьэмат:э [tħamaːtːa]	тхьэмат:э [tħamaːtːa]	тхьэматэ [tħamaːta]	тхьэматэ [tħamaːta]	тхьэмадэ [tħamaːda]
sun	т:ыгъэ [tːəɣa]	т:ыгъэ [tːəɣa]	т:ыгъэ [tːəɣa]	тыгъэ [təɣa]	тыгъэ [təɣa]	дыгъэ [dəɣa]
wing	т:амэ [tːaːma]	т:амэ [tːaːma]	т:амэ [tːaːma]	тамэ [taːma]	тамэ [taːma]	дамэ [daːma]

===== Front affricate t͡s =====
Aspirated: t͡sʰ ⟨цʰ⟩ → t͡s ⟨ц⟩

Tense: t͡sː ⟨ц: / цц⟩ → d͡z ⟨дз⟩

Word	Proto-Circassian	West Circassian				Kabardian
Word	Proto-Circassian	Shapsug	Bzhedugh & Hatuqay	Chemgui	Abzakh	Kabardian
Shift: t͡sʰ → t͡s
wool	цʰы [t͡sʰə]	цʰы [t͡sʰə]	цʰы [t͡sʰə]	цʰы [t͡sʰə]	цы [t͡sə]	цы [t͡sə]
eyelash	нэбзыцʰ [nabzət͡sʰ]	нэбзыцʰ [nabzət͡sʰ]	нэбзыцʰ [nabzət͡sʰ]	нэбзыц [nabzət͡s]	нэбзыц [nabzət͡s]	—

Word	Proto-Circassian	West Circassian				East Circassian	
Word	Proto-Circassian	Shapsug	Bzhedugh & Hatuqay	Chemgui	Abzakh	Besleney	Kabardian
Shift: t͡sː → d͡z
fish	пц:эжъые [pt͡sːaʐəja]	пц:эжъые [pt͡sːaʐəja]	пц:эжъые [pt͡sːaʐəja]	пцэжъые [pt͡saʐəja]	пцэжъые [pt͡saʐəja]	бдзэжъей [bd͡zaʐej]	бдзэжьей [bd͡zaʑej]
mouse	ц:ыгъо [t͡sːəʁʷa]	ц:ыгъо [t͡sːəʁʷa]	ц:ыгъо [t͡sːəʁʷa]	цыгъо [t͡səʁʷa]	цыгъо [t͡səʁʷa]	дзыгъуэ [d͡zəʁʷa]	дзыгъуэ [d͡zəʁʷa]

===== Middle affricate t͡ɕʷ (labialized) =====
Aspirated: t͡ɕʷʰ ⟨чʰу⟩ → t͡ɕʷ ⟨чу⟩

Tense: t͡ɕːʷ ⟨цу: / цуцу⟩ → v ⟨в⟩

Word	Proto-Circassian	West Circassian				Kabardian
Word	Proto-Circassian	Shapsug	Bzhedugh & Hatuqay	Chemgui	Abzakh	Kabardian
Shift: t͡ɕʷʰ → t͡ʃʷ
jungle	чъʰуны [t͡ɕʷʰənə]	чъʰуны [t͡ɕʷʰənə]	чъʰуны [t͡ɕʷʰənə]	цуны [t͡ʃʷənə]	цуны [t͡ʃʷənə]	фын [fən]

Word	Proto-Circassian	West Circassian				Kabardian
Word	Proto-Circassian	Shapsug	Bzhedugh & Hatuqay	Chemgui	Abzakh	Kabardian
haystack	хьанжъо [ħanʒʷa]	хьанжъо [ħanʒʷa]	хьанжъ [ħanʒʷ]	хьанжъо [ħanʒʷa]	хьанжъо [ħanʒʷa]	хьэвэ [ħavə]

===== Palatal affricate kʲ → t͡ʃ =====
Aspirated: kʲʰ ⟨кʰь⟩ → t͡ʃ ⟨ч⟩

Tense: kːʲ ⟨кь: / кькь⟩ → ɡʲ ⟨гь⟩ / d͡ʒ ⟨дж⟩

Word	Proto-Circassian	West Circassian				Kabardian
Word	Proto-Circassian	Shapsug	Bzhedugh & Hatuqay	Chemgui	Abzakh	Kabardian
Shift: kʲʰ → t͡ʃ / t͡ʃʰ
spleen	кьʰэ [kʲʰa]	кьʰэ [kʲʰa]	чʰэ [t͡ʃʰa]	чэ [t͡ʃa]	чэ [t͡ʃa]	чэ [t͡ʃa]
brushwood	кьʰы [kʲʰə]	кьʰы [kʲʰə]	чʰы [t͡ʃʰə]	чы [t͡ʃə]	чы [t͡ʃə]	чы [t͡ʃə]
to cough	пскьʰэн [pskʲʰan]	пскьʰэн [pskʲʰan]	псчʰэн [pst͡ʃʰan]	псчэн [pst͡ʃan]	псчэн [pst͡ʃan]	псчэн [pst͡ʃan]

Word	Proto-Circassian	West Circassian				East Circassian	
Word	Proto-Circassian	Shapsug	Bzhedugh & Hatuqay	Chemgui	Abzakh	Besleney	Kabardian
Shift: kːʲ → ɡʲ / d͡ʒ
glass	апкь: [aːpkːʲ]	апкь: [aːpkːʲ]	апч: [aːpt͡ʃː]	апч [aːpt͡ʃ]	апч [aːpt͡ʃ]	абгь [ʔaːbɡʲ]	абдж [ʔaːbd͡ʒ]
chicken	кь:эт [kːʲat]	кь:эт [kːʲat]	ч:эты [t͡ʃːatə]	чэты [t͡ʃatə]	чэты [t͡ʃatə]	гьэд [ɡʲad]	джэд [d͡ʒad]

===== Labialized velar kʷ =====
Aspirated: kʷʰ ⟨кʰу⟩ → kʷ ⟨ку⟩

Tense: kːʷ ⟨ку: / куку⟩ → ɡʷ ⟨гу⟩

Word	Proto-Circassian	West Circassian				Kabardian
Word	Proto-Circassian	Shapsug	Bzhedugh & Hatuqay	Chemgui	Abzakh	Kabardian
Shift: kʷʰ → kʷ
thigh	кʰо [kʷʰa]	кʰо [kʷʰa]	кʰо [kʷʰa]	ко [kʷa]	ко [kʷa]	куэ [kʷa]
middle	кʰу [kʷʰə]	кʰу [kʷʰə]	кʰу [kʷʰə]	ку [kʷə]	ку [kʷə]	ку [kʷə]

Word	Proto-Circassian	West Circassian				East Circassian	
Word	Proto-Circassian	Shapsug	Bzhedugh & Hatuqay	Chemgui	Abzakh	Besleney	Kabardian
Shift: kːʷ → ɡʷ
short	кӀьак:о [kʲʼaːkːʷa]	кӀьак:о [kʲʼaːkːʷa]	кӀак:о [t͡ʃʼaːkːʷa]	кӀако [t͡ʃʼaːkʷa]	кӀако [t͡ʃʼaːkʷa]	кӀьагуэ [kʲʼaːɡʷa]	кӀагуэ [t͡ʃʼaːɡʷa]
wheat	к:оц [kːʷat͡s]	к:оцы [kːʷat͡sə]	к:оцы [kːʷat͡sə]	коцы [kʷat͡sə]	коцы [kʷat͡sə]	гуэдз [ɡʷad͡z]	гуэдз [ɡʷad͡z]

===== Uvular q =====
Aspirated: qʰ ⟨кʰъ⟩ → q ⟨къ⟩ (Kabardian q͡χ)

Tense: qː ⟨къ: / къкъ⟩ → q ⟨къ⟩ (Adyghe); qʼ ⟨кӀъ⟩ (Kabardian)

Word	Proto-Circassian	West Circassian				Kabardian
Word	Proto-Circassian	Shapsug	Bzhedugh & Hatuqay	Chemgui	Abzakh	Kabardian
Shift: qʰ → q / q͡χ
grave	кʰъэ [qʰa]	кʰъэ [qʰa]	кʰъэ [qʰa]	къэ [qa]	къэ [qa]	кхъэ [q͡χa]

Word	Proto-Circassian	West Circassian				Kabardian
Word	Proto-Circassian	Shapsug	Bzhedugh & Hatuqay	Chemgui	Abzakh	Kabardian
Shift: qː → q / qʼ
clean	къ:абзэ [qːaːbza]	къ:абзэ [qːaːbza]	къабзэ [qaːbza]	къабзэ [qaːbza]	къабзэ [qaːbza]	къабзэ [qʼaːbza]

===== Labialized uvular qʷ =====
Aspirated: qʷʰ ⟨кʰъу⟩ → qʷ ⟨къу⟩ (Kabardian q͡χʷ)

Tense: qːʷ ⟨къу: / къукъу⟩ → qʷ ⟨къу⟩ (Adyghe); qʼʷ ⟨кӀъу⟩ (Kabardian)

Word	Proto-Circassian	West Circassian				Kabardian
Word	Proto-Circassian	Shapsug	Bzhedugh & Hatuqay	Chemgui	Abzakh	Kabardian
Shift: qʷʰ → qʷ / q͡χʷ
pig	кʰъо [qʰʷa]	кʰъо [qʰʷa]	кʰъо [qʰʷa]	къо [qʷa]	къо [qʷa]	кхъуэ [q͡χʷa]
cheese	кʰъуае [qʰʷaːja]	кʰъуае [qʰʷaːja]	кʰъуае [qʰʷaːja]	къуае [qʷaːja]	къуае [qʷaːja]	кхъуей [q͡χʷaj]
ship	кʰъохь [qʰʷaħ]	кʰъохь [qʰʷaħ]	кʰъохь [qʰʷaħ]	къухьэ [qʷəħa]	къухьэ [qʷəħa]	кхъухь [q͡χʷəħ]
to fart	къэкʰъун [qaqʰʷəʃʷən]	къэкʰъун [qaqʰʷəʃʷən]	къэкʰъун [qaqʰʷəʃʷən]	къэкъушъун [qaqʷəʃʷən]	къэкъушъун [qaqʷəʃʷən]	къэцыфын [qat͡səfən]
peer	кʰъужъы [qʰʷəʐə]	кʰъужъы [qʰʷəʐə]	кʰъужъы [qʰʷəʐə]	къужъы [qʷəʐə]	къужъы [qʷəʐə]	кхъужьы [q͡χʷəʑə]
pear	къожьы [qʰʷəźə]	къожьы [qʰʷəźə]	къожьы [qʰʷəźə]	къожьы [qʷəźə]	къожьы [qʷəźə]	къожь [qʷəź]

Word	Proto-Circassian	West Circassian				Kabardian
Word	Proto-Circassian	Shapsug	Bzhedugh & Hatuqay	Chemgui	Abzakh	Kabardian
Shift: qːʷ → qʷ / qʼʷ
son	къ:о [qːʷa]	къ:о [qːʷa]	къо [qʷa]	къо [qʷa]	къо [qʷa]	къо [qʷa]
mountain	къ:ушъхьэ [qːʷəʃħa]	къ:ушъхьэ [qːʷəʃħa]	къушъхьэ [qʷəʃħa]	къушъхьэ [qʷəʃħa]	къушъхьэ [qʷəʃħa]	къушхьэ [qʷəʃħa]

===== Postalveolar fricative ʃ =====
Aspirated: ʃʰ ⟨шʰ⟩ → ʃ ⟨ш⟩ / ɕ ⟨щ⟩

Retroflex variant: ʂʰ ⟨шʰъ⟩ → ʂ ⟨шъ⟩

Word	Proto-Circassian	West Circassian				Kabardian
Word	Proto-Circassian	Shapsug	Bzhedugh & Hatuqay	Chemgui	Abzakh	Kabardian
Shift: ʃʰ → ʃ / ɕ
brother	чʰы [t͡ʃʰə]	шʰы [ʃʰə]	шʰы [ʃʰə]	шы [ʃə]	шы [ʃə]	къуэш [qʷaʃ]
lame	лъашʰэ [ɬaːʃʰa]	лъашʰэ [ɬaːʃʰa]	лъашʰэ [ɬaːʃʰa]	лъащэ [ɬaːɕa]	лъащэ [ɬaːɕa]	лъашэ [ɬaːʃa]
milk	шʰэ [ʃʰa]	шʰэ [ʃʰa]	шʰэ [ʃʰa]	щэ [ɕa]	щэ [ɕa]	шэ [ʃa]
salt	шʰыгъу [ʃʰəʁʷ]	шʰыгъу [ʃʰəʁʷ]	шʰыгъу [ʃʰəʁʷ]	щыгъу [ɕəʁʷ]	щыгъу [ɕəʁʷ]	шыгъу [ʃəʁʷ]
cloud	пшʰэ [pʃʰa]	пшʰэ [pʃʰa]	пшʰэ [pʃʰa]	пщэ [pɕa]	пщэ [pɕa]	пшэ [pʃa]
pus	шʰыны [ʃʰənə]	шʰыны [ʃʰənə]	шʰыны [ʃʰənə]	щыны [ɕənə]	щыны [ɕənə]	шын [ʃən]
accordion	пщынэ [pɕəna]	пшʰынэ [pʃʰəna]	пщынэ [pɕəna]	пщынэ [pɕəna]	пщынэ [pɕəna]	пщынэ [pɕəna]
fat	пшʰэры [pʃʰarə]	пшʰэры [pʃʰarə]	пшʰэры [pʃʰarə]	пщэры [pɕarə]	пщэры [pɕarə]	пшэр [pʃar]
wax	щэфы [ɕafə]	иэфы [ʃʰafə]	щэфы [ɕafə]	щэфы [ɕafə]	щэфы [ɕafə]	щэху [ɕaxʷə]
horse	шʰы [ʃʰə]	шʰы [ʃʰə]	шʰы [ʃʰə]	шы [ʃə]	шы [ʃə]	шы [ʃə]
sand	пшʰахъо [pʃʰaːχʷa]	пшʰахъо [pʃʰaːχʷa]	пшʰахъо [pʃʰaːχʷa]	пшахъо [pʃaːχʷa]	пшахъо [pʃaːχʷa]	пшахъуэ [pʃaːχʷa]
story	пшʰысэ [pʃʰəsa]	пшʰысэ [pʃʰəsa]	пшʰысэ [pʃʰəsa]	пшысэ [pʃəsa]	пшысэ [pʃəsa]	пшысэ [pʃəsa]

===== Postalveolar fricative ʃ (additional lax–tense reflexes) =====
The book records further lax and tense back-sibilant reflexes, including a glottalized member.

Word	Proto-Circassian	West Circassian				East Circassian	
Word	Proto-Circassian	Shapsug	Bzhedugh & Hatuqay	Chemgui	Abzakh	Besleney	Kabardian
mountain top, surface	шʰагъо [ʃʰaɣʷa]	шʰагъо [ʃʰaɣʷa]	шагъо [ʃaɣʷa]	шагъо [ʃaɣʷa]	шагъо [ʃaɣʷa]	щагъуэ [ɕaɣʷa]	
measure, size	шʰапхъэ [ʃʰaːpχa]	шʰапхъэ [ʃʰaːpχa]	шапхъ [ʃaːpχ]	шапхъ [ʃaːpχ]	шапхъ [ʃaːpχ]	щапхъэ [ɕaːpχa]	
to collect	шʰапӀэ [ʃʰapʰa]	шʰапӀэ [ʃʰapʰa]	—	—	—	щапӀэ [ɕapʼa]	
internal fat	шъэ [ʃa]	шъэ [ʃa]	шъэ [ʃa]	шъэ [ʃa]	шъэ [ʃa]	щэ [ɕa]	
to measure (space)	шъы [ʃə]	шъы [ʃə]	шъы [ʃə]	шъы [ʃə]	шъы [ʃə]	щы [ɕə]	
hunter; to hunt	шъакӀо [ʃakʷʼa]	шъакӀо [ʃakʷʼa]	шъакӀо [ʃakʷʼa]	шъакӀо [ʃakʷʼa]	шъакӀо [ʃakʷʼa]	щакӀуэ [ɕakʷʼa]	
axe	Ӏуашъэ [waːʃʼa]	Ӏуашъэ [waːʃʼa]	Ӏуашъэ [waʃʼa]	Ӏуашъэ [waʃʼa]	Ӏуашъэ [waʃʼa]	Ӏуэщ [waɕ]	
to shear (sheep)	шъэ [ʃʼa]	шъэ [ʃʼa]	шъэ [ʃʼa]	шъэ [ʃʼa]	шъэ [ʃʼa]	щэ [ɕa]	
three	шъэ [ʃʼa]	шъэ [ʃʼa]	шъэ [ʃʼa]	шъэ [ʃʼa]	шъэ [ʃʼa]	щы [ɕə]	
princess	гуашъэ [ɡʷaːʃʼa]	гуашъэ [ɡʷaːʃʼa]	гуашъэ [ɡʷaːʃʼa]	гуашъэ [ɡʷaːʃʼa]	гуашъэ [ɡʷaːʃʼa]	гуащэ [ɡʷaːɕa]	
prince	пшъэ [pʃʼa]	пшъэ [pʃʼa]	пшъэ [pʃʼa]	пшъэ [pʃʼa]	пшъэ [pʃʼa]	пщэ [pɕa]	

===== Back affricates t͡ʃ / t͡ʂ (tense) =====
Tense palato-alveolar: t͡ʃː ⟨ч: / чч⟩ → d͡ʒ ⟨дж⟩ / ʒ ⟨ж⟩

Tense retroflex: t͡ʂː ⟨чъ: / чъчъ⟩ → d͡ʐ ⟨джъ⟩ / ʒ ⟨ж⟩

Word	Proto-Circassian	West Circassian				East Circassian	
Word	Proto-Circassian	Shapsug	Bzhedugh & Hatuqay	Chemgui	Abzakh	Besleney	Kabardian
Shift: t͡ʃː → d͡ʒ / ʒ
night	ч:эщ [t͡ʃːaɕ]	ч:эщы [t͡ʃːaɕə]	ч:эщы [t͡ʃːaɕə]	чэщы [t͡ʃaɕə]	чэщы [t͡ʃaɕə]	джэщ [d͡ʒaɕ]	жэщ [ʒaɕ]
village	ч:ылэ [t͡ʃːəɮa]	ч:ылэ [t͡ʃːəɮa]	ч:ылэ [t͡ʃːəɮa]	чылэ [t͡ʃəɮa]	чылэ [t͡ʃəɮa]	джылэ [d͡ʒəɮa]	жылэ [ʒəɮa]
cow	ч:эм [t͡ʃːam]	ч:эмы [t͡ʃːamə]	ч:эмы [t͡ʃːamə]	чэмы [t͡ʃamə]	чэмы [t͡ʃamə]	джэм [d͡ʒam]	жэм [ʒam]
Shift: t͡ʂː → d͡ʐ / ʒ
tree	чъ:ыг [t͡ʂːəɣ]	чъ:ыгы [t͡ʂːəɣə]	чъ:ыгы [t͡ʂːəɣə]	чъыгы [t͡ʂəɣə]	чъыгы [t͡ʂəɣə]	джъыг [d͡ʐəɣ]	жыг [ʒəɣ]

===== Back affricates t͡ʃ (lax and plain, full dialect reflexes) =====
The lax (aspirated) and plain back affricates show distinct outcomes across all dialects, including Besleney.

Word	Proto-Circassian	West Circassian				East Circassian	
Word	Proto-Circassian	Shapsug	Bzhedugh & Hatuqay	Chemgui	Abzakh	Besleney	Kabardian
Lax t͡ʃʰ
horse	шʰы [ʃʰə]	чʰы [t͡ʃʰə]	шʰы [ʃʰə]	шы [ʃə]	шы [ʃə]	чы [t͡ʃə]	шы [ʃə]
rough, tough	пхъашʰэ [pχaːʃʰa]	пхъачʰэ [pχaːt͡ʃʰa]	пхъашʰэ [pχaːʃʰa]	пхъашэ [pχaːʃa]	пхъашэ [pχaːʃa]	—	пхъашэ [pχaːʃa]

===== Front affricate t͡s (additional lax–tense reflexes) =====
The book records further front-affricate examples, including tense reflexes that surface as d͡z in Kabardian.

Word	Proto-Circassian	West Circassian				Kabardian
Word	Proto-Circassian	Shapsug	Bzhedugh & Hatuqay	Chemgui	Abzakh	Kabardian
hair, wool	цʰы [t͡sʰə]	цʰы [t͡sʰə]	цʰы [t͡sʰə]	цы [t͡sə]	цы [t͡sə]	цы [t͡sə]
(wooden) spade	хьанцʰэ [ħant͡sʰa]	хьанцʰэ [ħant͡sʰa]	хьанцʰэ [ħant͡sʰa]	хьанц [ħant͡s]	хьанц [ħant͡s]	хьанцэ [ħant͡sa]
tooth	цэ [t͡sa]	цэ [t͡sa]	цэ [t͡sa]	цэ [t͡sa]	цэ [t͡sa]	дзэ [d͡za]
mouse	цыгъэ [t͡səɣʷa]	цыгъэ [t͡səɣʷa]	цыгъэ [t͡səɣʷa]	цыгъэ [t͡saɣʷa]	цыгъэ [t͡saɣʷa]	дзыгъуэ [d͡zəɣʷa]

===== Back spirant ʒ (voiced) =====
Voiced back spirant: ʒ → Adyghe and Besleney ʒ : Kabardian ʑ ⟨жь⟩.

Word	Proto-Circassian	West Circassian				East Circassian	
Word	Proto-Circassian	Shapsug	Bzhedugh & Hatuqay	Chemgui	Abzakh	Besleney	Kabardian
mouth	жэ [ʒa]	жэ [ʒa]	жэ [ʒa]	жэ [ʒa]	жэ [ʒa]	жэ [ʒa]	жьэ [ʑa]
sledge	жэ [ʒa]	жэ [ʒa]	жэ [ʒa]	жэ [ʒa]	жэ [ʒa]	Ӏажэ [ʔaːʒa]	Ӏажьэ [ʔaːʑa]
flea	бжэжэ [bʒaʒa]	бжэжэ [bʒaʒa]	бжэжэ [bʒaʒa]	бжэжэ [bʒaʒa]	бжэжэ [bʒaʒa]	—	бжьэжьэ [bʑaʑa]
wind	жьы [ʒə]	жьы [ʒə]	жьы [ʒə]	жьы [ʒə]	жьы [ʒə]	—	жьы [ʑə]
bee	бжьы [bʒə]	бжьы [bʒə]	бжьы [bʒə]	бжьы [bʒə]	бжьы [bʒə]	бжьы [bʒə]	бжьы [bʑə]
weasel	уэжьы [waʒə]	уэжьы [waʒə]	уэжьы [waʒə]	уэжьы [waʒə]	уэжьы [waʒə]	уэжьы [waʒə]	уэжьы [waʑə]

==== The Two Major Shifts ====
The consonant system of the modern Circassian dialects looks the way it does because of two sound changes that swept through the language at different times. To understand them, it helps to start with the ancestor language, Proto-Circassian, and see what it had that the modern dialects have since reshaped.

Proto-Circassian had a rich set of stops and affricates. (An affricate is a single sound that begins like a stop and releases like a fricative — think of the "ch" in English church or the "j" in judge.) Crucially, Proto-Circassian distinguished three groups of sounds that would later become tangled together:

Postalveolar affricates (made with the tongue just behind the ridge behind the teeth):

- d͡ʒ ⟨дж⟩
- t͡ʃ ⟨ч⟩
- t͡ʃʼ ⟨чӀ⟩

Retroflex affricates (made with the tongue curled further back):

- t͡ʂ ⟨чъ⟩
- t͡ʂʼ ⟨чӀъ⟩

Palatalized velars (k- and g-type sounds pronounced with the tongue raised toward the hard palate, giving them a "soft", y-coloured quality):

- ɡʲ ⟨гь⟩
- kʲ ⟨кь⟩
- kʲʼ ⟨кӀь⟩

The key thing to notice is that the palatalized velars (гь, кь, кӀь) were originally completely separate from the affricates (дж, ч, чӀ). They sounded different and behaved differently. The two sound changes described below are what eventually caused some dialects to merge these two groups, which is why the modern picture can look confusing at first.

The two phases are: Spirantization (Phase 1), in which old affricates turned into fricatives, and Velar Palatalization (Phase 2), in which the palatalized velars turned into affricates. They did not happen everywhere, and they did not happen in the same dialects — which is exactly why comparing dialects lets us reconstruct the original system.

===== Phase 1: Spirantization (Affricate → Fricative) =====
Spirantization simply means "turning into a fricative" (a spirant is just another word for a fricative — a hissing sound like sh, or zh, where air flows continuously instead of being briefly stopped). In Phase 1, the original Proto-Circassian postalveolar and retroflex affricates lost their initial "stop" portion and became plain fricatives.

In other words, a sound like d͡ʒ (the "j" in judge) simply dropped its stop beginning and was left as ʒ (the "s" in measure). The same thing happened to the whole series.

- Affected Dialects: Abzakh, Modern Standard Kabardian, and archaic Kabardian dialects.
- Unaffected Dialects: Shapsug, Bzhedug, Chemguy, and Besleney. (These dialects kept the original affricates intact, which is why they are so valuable for reconstructing the older system.)

The individual shifts were:

- d͡ʒ ⟨дж⟩ → ʒ ⟨ж⟩
- t͡ʃ ⟨ч⟩ → ʃ ⟨ш⟩ / ʒ ⟨ж⟩
- t͡ʃʼ ⟨чӀ⟩ → ɕʼ ⟨щӀ⟩
- t͡ʂ ⟨чъ⟩ → ʂ ⟨шъ⟩ / ʒ ⟨ж⟩
- t͡ʂʼ ⟨чӀъ⟩ → ɕʼ ⟨щӀ⟩

Notice that the plain affricates could end up as either ʃ/ʂ or ʒ depending on the dialect (compare Abzakh, which favours the voiceless ш/шъ, with Kabardian, which often voices these to ж). The ejective affricates (чӀ, чӀъ — the ones with a "popping", glottalic release marked by Ӏ) both collapsed into the single ejective fricative ɕʼ ⟨щӀ⟩.

There is also one dialect-specific quirk worth noting. In Abzakh, the ejective t͡ʃʼ ⟨чӀ⟩ frequently did not become a fricative at all, but instead weakened all the way to a palatalized glottal stop ʔʲ ⟨Ӏь⟩ — essentially a catch in the throat rather than a hiss.

A few worked examples make the pattern concrete:

- Proto-Circassian чӀэкӀьын "to come out from under" → щӀэкӀьын in Proto-Kabardian, but ӀекӀьын in Proto-Abzakh (showing the чӀ → Ӏь weakening).
- Proto-Circassian чӀэгъуэжьын "to regret" → щӀэгъуэжын in Kabardian, Ӏегъуэжьын in Abzakh.
- Proto-Circassian пачӀэ "mustache" → пащӀэ in both Kabardian and Abzakh.
- Proto-Circassian чӀалэ "boy; young man" → щӀалэ in Kabardian, but Ӏелэ in Abzakh.
- Proto-Circassian чӀымахуэ "winter" → щӀымахуэ in Kabardian, щӀымафэ in Abzakh.
- Proto-Circassian чӀэ "new" → щӀэ in both Kabardian and Abzakh.

There is one important catch that sets up Phase 2. In the dialects affected by Phase 1 only (some archaic Kabardian dialects) or by both phases (Standard Kabardian and Abzakh), the change applied to the original affricates but left the original palatalized velars untouched — for the time being. So at this stage, words built on the old velar кӀь were still pronounced with kʲʼ: кӀьапсэ "rope", кӀьэрахъуэ "gun", and кӀьэ "tail" all still had a genuine k-sound. They had not yet been pulled into the affricate series. That only happened later, in Phase 2.

The following table demonstrates the Phase 1 shift (affricate → fricative), grouped by individual sound change. It shows how Abzakh and Standard Kabardian innovated, while Bzhedug, Chemguy, and Besleney stayed conservative for these particular consonants.

Word	Proto Circassian	Bzhedug Chemguy (No Phase 1)	Besleney (No Phase 1)	Abzakh (Phase 1 affected)	Standard Kabardian (Phase 1 affected)
Shift: d͡ʒ ⟨дж⟩ → ʒ ⟨ж⟩
fox	баджэ [baːd͡ʒa]	баджэ [baːd͡ʒa]	баджэ [baːd͡ʒa]	бажэ [baːʒa]	бажэ [baːʒa]
flour	хьаджыгъэ	хьаджыгъэ	хьажыгъэ	хьэжыгъэ	хьэжыгъэ
village	къуаджэ [qʷaːd͡ʒa]	къуаджэ [qʷaːd͡ʒa]	къуаджэ [qʷaːd͡ʒa]	къуажэ [qʷaːʒa]	къуажэ [qʷaːʒa]
Shift: t͡ʃ ⟨ч⟩ → ʃ ⟨ш⟩ / ʒ ⟨ж⟩
village	чылэ [t͡ʃəɮa]	чылэ [t͡ʃəɮa]	джылэ [d͡ʒəɮa]	шылэ [ʃəɮa]	жылэ [ʒəɮa]
night	чэщ [t͡ʃaɕ]	чэщы [t͡ʃaɕə]	джэщ [d͡ʒaɕ]	шэщы [ʃaɕə]	жэщ [ʒaɕ]
cow	чэм [t͡ʃam]	чэмы [t͡ʃamə]	джэм [d͡ʒam]	шэмы [ʃamə]	жэм [ʒam]
Shift: t͡ʃʼ ⟨чӀ⟩ → ɕʼ ⟨щӀ⟩ (Abzakh ш)
new	чӀэ [t͡ʃʼa]	чӀэ [t͡ʃʼa]	чӀэ [t͡ʃʼa]	шӀэ [ʃʼa]	щӀэ [ɕʼa]
winter	чӀымахо [t͡ʃʼəmaːxʷa]	чӀымафэ [t͡ʃʼəmaːfa]	чӀымахуэ [t͡ʃʼəmaːxʷa]	шӀымафэ [ʃʼəmaːfa]	щӀымахуэ [ɕʼəmaːxʷa]
young-man	чӀалэ [t͡ʃʼaːɮa]	чӀалэ [t͡ʃʼaːɮa]	чӀалэ [t͡ʃʼaːɮa]	Ӏелэ [ʔʲaːɮa]	щӀалэ [ɕʼaːɮa]
Shift: t͡ʂ ⟨чъ⟩ → ʂ ⟨шъ⟩ / ʒ ⟨ж⟩
to sleep	чъыен [t͡ʂəjan]	чъыен [t͡ʂəjan]	джъеин [d͡ʐajən]	шъыен [ʂəjan]	жеин [ʒajən]
tree	чъыг [t͡ʂəɣ]	чъыгы [t͡ʂəɣə]	джъыг [d͡ʐəɣ]	шъыгы [ʂəɣə]	жыг [ʒəɣ]
to run	чъэн [t͡ʂan]	чъэн [t͡ʂan]	джъэн [d͡ʐan]	шъэн [tʂan]	жэн [ʒan]
Shift: t͡ʂʼ ⟨чӀъ⟩ → ɕʼ ⟨щӀ⟩ (Abzakh шӀ)
area	чӀыпӀэ [t͡ʂʼəpʼa]	чӀыпӀэ [t͡ʂʼəpʼa]	чӀыпӀэ [t͡ʂʼəpʼa]	шӀыпӀэ [ʃʼəpʼa]	щӀыпӀэ [ɕʼəpʼa]
iron	гъучӀы [ʁʷət͡ʂʼə]	гъучӀы [ʁʷət͡ʂʼə]	гъучӀы [ʁʷət͡ʂʼə]	гъушӀы [ʃʼəpʼa]	гъущӀы [ɕʼəpʼa]

===== Phase 2: Velar Palatalization =====
Phase 2 came later, and in a sense it is the mirror image of Phase 1. Where Phase 1 turned affricates into fricatives, Phase 2 turned the leftover palatalized velars into affricates. The technical name is velar palatalization (or affrication of velars): the "soft" k- and g-sounds (гь, кь, кӀь) shifted their place of articulation forward and became palato-alveolar affricates — дж [d͡ʒ], ч [t͡ʃ], and чӀ [t͡ʃʼ] respectively.

This is the change that finally merges the two groups in the dialects that underwent both phases. Once the old affricates had vacated their "slots" by becoming fricatives (Phase 1), the velars moved in and filled those slots by becoming the new affricates (Phase 2). The result is that a modern Standard Kabardian чӀ is not the original чӀ at all — the original one became щӀ in Phase 1 — but rather a brand-new чӀ created out of the old кӀь.

- Affected Dialects: Abzakh, Bzhedug, Chemguy, and Modern Standard Kabardian.
- Unaffected Dialects: Shapsug, Besleney, and archaic Kabardian dialects. (In these, the soft velars кь, гь, кӀь survive to this day.)

The individual shifts were:

- ɡʲ ⟨гь⟩ → d͡ʒ ⟨дж⟩
- kʲ ⟨кь⟩ → t͡ʃ ⟨ч⟩
- kʲʼ ⟨кӀь⟩ → t͡ʃʼ ⟨чӀ⟩

This is why words that were still pronounced with a velar at the end of Phase 1 are now pronounced as affricates in these dialects. The words чӀапсэ "rope", чӀэрахъуэ "gun", and чӀэ "tail" — which had genuine кӀь kʲʼ a moment ago — are now said with t͡ʃʼ.

Word	Proto Circassian	Shapsug (No Phase 2)	Bzhedug Chemguy Abzakh (Phase 2 affected)	Besleney (No Phase 2)	Kabardian (Phase 2 affected)
Shift: kʲ → t͡ʃ
to cough	пскʰьэн [pskʲʰan]	пскʰьэн [pskʲʰan]	псчэн [pst͡ʃan]	пскьэн [pskʲan]	псчэн [pst͡ʃan]
throat	кьый [kʲəj]	кьый [kʲəj]	чый [t͡ʃəj]	кьий [kʲəj]	чий [t͡ʃəj]
spleen	кьэ [kʲa]	кьэ [kʲa]	чэ [t͡ʃa]	кьэ [kʲa]	чэ [t͡ʃa]
glass	апкь [aːpkʲ]	апкь [aːpkʲ]	апч [aːpt͡ʃ]	абгь [ʔaːbɡʲ]	абдж [ʔaːbd͡ʒ]
chicken	кьэт [kʲat]	кьэт [kʲat]	чэты [t͡ʃatə]	гьэд [ɡʲad]	джэд [d͡ʒad]
Shift: ɡʲ → d͡ʒ
game	гьэгу [ɡʲaɡʷ]	гьэгу [ɡʲaɡʷ]	джэгу [d͡ʒaɡʷ]	гьэгу [ɡʲaɡʷ]	джэгу [d͡ʒaɡʷ]
shirt	гьанэ [ɡʲaːna]	гьанэ [ɡʲaːna]	джанэ [d͡ʒaːna]	гьанэ [ɡʲaːna]	джанэ [d͡ʒaːna]
to study	егьэн [jaɡʲan]	егьэн [jaɡʲan]	еджэн [jad͡ʒan]	егьэн [jaɡʲan]	еджэн [jad͡ʒan]
sick	сымагьэ [səmaːɡʲa]	сымагьэ [səmaːɡʲa]	сымаджэ [səmaːd͡ʒa]	сымагьэ [səmaːɡʲa]	сымаджэ [səmaːd͡ʒa]
evil	бзагьэ [bzaːɡʲa]	бзагьэ [bzaːɡʲa]	бзаджэ [bzaːd͡ʒa]	бзагьэ [bzaːɡʲa]	бзаджэ [bzaːd͡ʒa]
bitter	дыгь [dəɡʲ]	дыгьы [dəɡʲə]	дыджы [dəd͡ʒə]	дыгь [dəɡʲ]	дыдж [dəd͡ʒ]
Shift: kʲʼ → t͡ʃʼ
short	кӀьако [kʲʼaːkʷa]	кӀьако [kʲʼaːkʷa]	чӀако [t͡ʃʼaːkʷa]	кӀьагуэ [kʲʼaːɡʷa]	чӀагуэ [t͡ʃʼaːɡʷa]
rope	кӀьапсэ [kʲʼaːpsa]	кӀьапсэ [kʲʼaːpsa]	чӀапсэ [t͡ʃʼaːpsa]	кӀьапсэ [kʲʼaːpsa]	чӀапсэ [t͡ʃʼaːpsa]
egg	кӀьэнкӀьэ [kʲʼankʲʼa]	кӀьакӀьэ [kʲʼaːkʲʼa]	чӀэнчӀэ [t͡ʃʼant͡ʃʼa]	гьэдыкӀэ [ɡʲadəkʲʼa]	джэдыкӀэ [d͡ʒadət͡ʃʼa]
gun	кӀьэрахъуэ [kʲʼaraːχʷa]	кӀьэрахъуэ [kʲʼaraːχʷa]	чӀэрахъо [t͡ʃʼaraːχʷa]	кӀьэрахъуэ [kʲʼaraːχʷa]	кӀэрахъуэ [t͡ʃʼaraːχʷa]
key	ӀункӀьыбзэ [ʔʷənkʲʼəbza]	ӀункӀьыбзэ [ʔʷənkʲʼəbza]	ӀунчӀыбзэ [ʔʷənt͡ʃʼəbza]	ӀункӀьыбзэ [ʔʷənkʲʼəbza]	ӀунчӀыбз [ʔʷənt͡ʃʼəbz]
ceiling	кӀьашъо [kʲʼaːʃʷa]	кӀьашъо [kʲʼaːʃʷa]	чӀашъо [t͡ʃʼaːʃʷa]	кӀьафэ [kʲʼaːfa]	чӀафэ [t͡ʃʼaːfa]
beard	жьа кӀьэ [ʑaːkʲʼa]	жьа кӀьэ [ʑaːkʲʼa]	жачӀэ [ʒaːt͡ʃʼa]	жьакӀьэ [ʑaːkʲʼa]	жьачӀэ [ʑaːt͡ʃʼa]
tail	кӀьэ [kʲʼa]	кӀьэ [kʲʼa]	чӀэ [t͡ʃʼa]	кӀьэ [kʲʼa]	чӀэ [t͡ʃʼa]
to kill	укӀьын [wkʲʼən]	укӀьын [wkʲʼən]	учӀын [wt͡ʃʼən]	укӀьын [wkʲʼən]	учӀын [wt͡ʃʼən]
nit	цӀакӀьэ	сӀакӀьэ	цӀакӀьэ	цӀакӀьэ	цӀачӀэ
smithy	к1ыыщ	к1ыыщ	ч1ыыщ	к1ыыщ	ч1ыыщ

===== Summary of Dialectal Evolution =====
Because the two phases were independent, each dialect can be classified simply by asking two yes/no questions: did it undergo Phase 1, and did it undergo Phase 2? The four possible answers give four neat groups:

- Shapsug & Besleney — neither phase. These are the most conservative dialects. They preserve both the original affricates and the original palatalized velars as separate sounds, which is precisely why linguists lean on them to reconstruct Proto-Circassian.
- Bzhedug & Chemguy — Phase 2 only. They kept the original affricates but shifted their velars into affricates. Because the old affricates were still present, the new ones from the velars simply merged in with them.
- Some Kabardian dialects (e.g. Uzunyayla) — Phase 1 only. They turned the original affricates into fricatives, but their soft velars never advanced, so words like кӀьэ "tail" still keep their kʲʼ.
- Abzakh & Modern Standard Kabardian — both phases. First the original affricates spirantized (Phase 1), and then the velars moved in to become the new affricates (Phase 2). This two-step "chain shift" is why a modern чӀ in these dialects descends from an old velar кӀь, not from the old affricate чӀ (which is now щӀ).

The cleanest way to see all of this is to follow two words side by side: one built on an original affricate (so it only ever reacts to Phase 1) and one built on an original palatalized velar (so it only ever reacts to Phase 2). The table below does exactly that.

Word	Proto Circassian	Shapsug (No Phases)	Besleney (No Phases)	Bzhedug Chemguy (Phase 2 Only)	Some Kabardian dialects (Phase 1 Only)	Abzakh (Both Phases)	Standard Kabardian (Both Phases)
tail	кӀьэ [kʲʼa]	кӀьэ [kʲʼa]	кӀьэ [kʲʼa]	чӀэ [t͡ʃʼa]	кӀьэ [kʲʼa]	чӀэ [t͡ʃʼa]	чӀэ [t͡ʃʼa]
new	чӀэ [t͡ʃʼa]	чӀэ [t͡ʃʼa]	кӀьэ [t͡ʃʼa]	чӀэ [t͡ʃʼa]	щӀэ [ʃʼa]	щӀэ [ʃʼa]	щӀэ [ʃʼa]
winter	чӀымахуэ [t͡ʃʼəmaːxʷa]	чӀымафэ [t͡ʃʼəmaːfa]	чӀымахуэ [t͡ʃʼəmaːxʷa]	чӀымафэ [t͡ʃʼəmaːfa]	щӀымахуэ [ʃʼəmaːxʷa]	щӀымафэ [ʃʼəmaːfa]	щӀымахуэ [ʃʼəmaːxʷa]
mustache	пачӀэ [paːt͡ʃʼa]	пачӀэ [paːt͡ʃʼa]	пачӀэ [paːt͡ʃʼa]	пачӀэ [paːt͡ʃʼa]	пащӀэ [paːʃʼa]	пащӀэ [paːʃʼa]	пащӀэ [paːʃʼa]

==== Introduction of Labiodental Fricatives ====
Proto-Circassian lacked the labiodental fricatives: the voiceless labiodental fricative [f] and the voiced labiodental fricative [v]. These sounds developed independently in the Western (Adyghe) and Eastern (Kabardian) dialects from completely different phonological sources.

In summary:

- Western Dialects derived [f] from the velar [xʷ].
- Eastern Dialects derived [f] and [v] from labialized sibilants (t͡ɕʷ, ɕʷ, ʑʷ).

===== Western Shift (Velar to Labiodental) =====
In Western Circassian dialects (such as Abzakh, Bzhedug, Chemguy, and Shapsug), the Proto-Circassian labialized voiceless velar fricative [xʷ] ⟨ху⟩ shifted to the voiceless labiodental fricative [f] ⟨ф⟩.

In Eastern dialects (Kabardian and Besleney), this consonant remained a velar [xʷ].

- xʷ ⟨ху⟩ → f ⟨ф⟩

Western Shift: xʷ → f
Word	Proto Circassian	Western (Shifted)	Eastern (Retained)
human	цӀыху [t͡sʼəxʷ]	цӀыф [t͡sʼəf]	цӀыху [t͡sʼəxʷ]
white	хужь [xʷəʑ]	фыжьы [fəʑə]	хужь [xʷəʑ]
hot	хуабэ [xʷaːba]	фабэ [faːba]	хуабэ [xʷaːba]
day	махо [maːxʷa]	мафэ [maːfa]	махуэ [maːxʷa]

===== Eastern Shift (Sibilant to Labiodental) =====
In Eastern Circassian dialects, a series of Proto-Circassian labialized postalveolar consonants (t͡ɕʷ, ʑʷ, ɕʷ, ɕʷʼ) shifted to become labiodental consonants.

In Western dialects, these consonants retained their original sibilant nature (pronounced as t͡ɕʷ, ʑʷ, ɕʷ, ɕʷʼ).

The specific shifts in Eastern dialects were:

- t͡ɕʷʰ ⟨цу⟩ → f ⟨ф⟩
- t͡ɕʷ ⟨цу⟩ → v ⟨в⟩
- ʑʷ ⟨жъу⟩ → v ⟨в⟩
- ɕʷ ⟨шъу⟩ → f ⟨ф⟩
- ɕʷʼ ⟨шӀу⟩ → fʼ ⟨фӀ⟩

Eastern Shift: Sibilants → Labiodentals
Word	Proto Circassian	Western (Retained)	Eastern (Shifted)
Shift: t͡ɕʷ → v
ox	цу [t͡ɕʷə]	цу [t͡ɕʷə]	вы [və]
shoe	цуакъэ [t͡ɕʷaːqa]	цуакъэ [t͡ɕʷaːqa]	вакъэ [vaːqa]
Shift: ʑʷ → v
star	жъуагъо [ʑʷaːʁʷa]	жъуагъо [ʑʷaːʁʷa]	вагъуэ [vaːʁʷa]
stone	мыжъо [məʑʷa]	мыжъо [məʑʷa]	мывэ [məva]
narrow	зэжъу [zaʑʷə]	зэжъу [zaʑʷə]	зэвы [zavə]
Shift: ɕʷ → f
you (pl.)	шъо [ɕʷa]	шъо [ɕʷa]	фэ [fa]
honey	шъоу [ɕʷaw]	шъоу [ɕʷaw]	фо [faw]
wife	шъуз [ɕʷəz]	шъуз [ɕʷəz]	фыз [fəz]
Shift: ɕʷʼ → fʼ
black	шӀуцӀэ [ɕʷʼət͡sʼa]	шӀуцӀэ [ɕʷʼət͡sʼa]	фӀыцӀэ [fʼət͡sʼa]
fire	машӀо [maːɕʷʼa]	машӀо [maːɕʷʼa]	мафӀэ [maːfʼa]
dirty	шӀои [ɕʷʼajə]	шӀои [ɕʷʼajə]	фӀей [fʼaj]

===== Divergence Example: "Light" vs. "Blind" =====
An interesting consequence of these opposing phonological shifts is the divergence of the words for "light" and "blind".

Proto-Circassian possessed two distinct words:

- Light: naxʷ ⟨нэху⟩ (containing the velar xʷ)
- Blind: naɕʷ ⟨нэшъу⟩ (containing the sibilant ɕʷ)

Due to the different sources of the labiodental [f] in the dialects, these words shifted in opposite directions:

- In Western (Adyghe): The velar xʷ became f. Therefore, "light" became ⟨нэф⟩. The sibilant ɕʷ was retained, so "blind" remained ⟨нэшъу⟩.
- In Eastern (Kabardian): The sibilant ɕʷ became f. Therefore, "blind" became ⟨нэф⟩. The velar xʷ was retained, so "light" remained ⟨нэху⟩.

As a result, the word ⟨нэф⟩ is a "false friend" between the dialects: it means light in Adyghe, but blind in Kabardian.

Evolution of "Light" and "Blind"
Meaning	Proto-Circassian	Western (Adyghe)		Eastern (Kabardian)	
Meaning	Proto-Circassian	Shift	Result	Shift	Result
Light	нэху [naxʷ]	xʷ → f	нэф [naf]	(Retained)	нэху [naxʷ]
Blind	нэшъу [naɕʷ]	(Retained)	нэшъу [naɕʷ]	ɕʷ → f	нэф [naf]

===== Morphological Impact: Benefactive vs. Malefactive Prefixes =====
The phonological shifts also affected grammatical prefixes, creating distinct forms for the Benefactive and Malefactive prefixes in the modern dialects.

In Proto-Circassian, these prefixes were distinct:

- Benefactive ("for"): xʷa ⟨хуэ⟩ — containing the velar xʷ.
- Malefactive ("to the detriment of"): ɕʷʼa ⟨шӀуэ⟩ — containing the ejective sibilant ɕʷʼ.

Due to the shifts:

- In Western (Adyghe): The Benefactive xʷa became fa ⟨фэ⟩, while the Malefactive ɕʷʼa was retained as ⟨шӀуэ⟩.
- In Eastern (Kabardian): The Benefactive xʷa was retained as ⟨хуэ⟩, while the Malefactive ɕʷʼa shifted to fʼa ⟨фӀэ⟩.

Comparison of Prefixes
Function	Proto Circassian	Western (Adyghe)	Eastern (Kabardian)
Benefactive (for someone's sake)	хуэ- [xʷa-]	фэ- [fa-]	хуэ- [xʷa-]
Malefactive (to someone's detriment)	шӀуэ- [ɕʷʼa-]	шӀуэ- [ɕʷʼa-]	фӀэ- [fʼa-]

Examples of verbs utilizing these prefixes:

Meaning	Proto Circassian	Western (Adyghe)	Eastern (Kabardian)
to go for someone's sake	хуэкӀуэн [xʷakʷʼan]	фэкӀон [fakʷʼan]	хуэкӀуэн [xʷakʷʼan]
to lose (lit. to go from someone)	шӀуэкӀуэн [ɕʷʼakʷʼan]	шӀуэкӀон [ɕʷʼakʷʼan]	фӀэкӀуэн [fʼakʷʼan]
to take for someone's sake	хуэхьын [xʷaħən]	фэхьын [faħən]	хуэхьын [xʷaħən]
to take away from (forcefully)	шӀуэхьын [ɕʷʼaħən]	шӀуэхьын [ɕʷʼaħən]	фӀэхьын [fʼaħən]

===== Glottalized uvular qʼ =====
The Common Circassian glottalized uvular *qʼ became a plain glottal stop ʔ in most Circassian dialects, while it was preserved as qʼ in the Hakutsw (Hakuchey) subdialect of Shapsug.

Word	Proto-Circassian	Bzhedugh / Temirgoy / Abzakh / Kabardian	Hakutsw Shapsug
Shift: qʼ → ʔ
hand, arm	Ӏэ [ʔa]	Ӏэ [ʔa]	къӀэ [qʼa]
haystack	ӀатӀэ [ʔaːtʰa]	ӀатӀэ [ʔaːta]	къӀатӀэ [qʼaːta]
Shift: qʼʷ → ʔʷ
clever	Ӏушэ [ʔʷaśa]	Ӏушэ [ʔʷaś]	къӀушэ [qʷʼaśa]
nail	Ӏунэ [ʔʷəna]	Ӏунэ [ʔʷəna]	къӀунэ [qʷʼəna]
to turn, wind	ӀантӀэ [ʔʷaːnta]	ӀантӀэ [ʔʷaːnta]	къӀантӀэ [qʷʼaːnta]

== Grammar ==
=== Dynamic prefix *wa- ===
In Proto-Circassian, the dynamic prefix is reconstructed as *wa- (уэ-). This verbal morpheme spans across several grammatical categories, strictly indicating that a verb is operating in the positive, dynamic, present tense. As the languages diverged, this prefix underwent distinct phonological shifts:

Dialectal Shifts of the Dynamic Prefix
Branch	Shift	Phrase	Morphology	Translation
West Circassian (Adyghe)	-э- ([-a-])	сэ сэкӀо	сэ с-э-кӀо	I go
East Circassian (Kabardian)	-о- ([-o-])	сэ сокӀуэ	сэ с-о-кӀуэ	I go

In some specific verb roots, the East Circassian (Kabardian) branch preserves the ancestral *wa- (уэ-) more transparently than West Circassian. For instance, in the dynamic verb for "standing/spending time," Kabardian retains the form щ-уэ-ты-р, whereas West Circassian fully reduces the prefix to щ-э-ты.

The historical reduction of the ancestral *wa- (уэ-) to the modern -э- in West Circassian is clearly visible in the conjugation of monovalent intransitive verbs without prefixes (such as "to go"). Through a process of vowel dropping and assimilation, the original forms simplified:

- 1st Person Singular: сэ-кӀо (I go) < *с-уэ-кӀо < *сы-уэ-кӀо
- 2nd Person Singular: о-кӀо / уэ-кӀо (You go) < *у-уэ-кӀо < *уы-уэ-кӀо
- 1st Person Plural: тэ-кӀо (We go) < *т-уэ-кӀо < *ты-уэ-кӀо
- 2nd Person Plural: шъо-кӀо / шъу-э-кӀо (You all go) < *шъу-уэ-кӀо < *шъуы-уэ-кӀо

The presence of the dynamic prefix is highly restricted. It is completely dropped from the verb complex under the following grammatical conditions:

Non-Present Tenses: It is omitted in the past and future tenses, allowing personal pronouns to attach directly to the verb root or relational prefixes. For example, while the dynamic prefix is active in the present tense, it is entirely absent in past forms such as сы-кIуагъ (I went), у-кIуагъ (You went), кIуагъэ (He went), and с-тхыгъэ (I wrote that).

Branch	Tense	Phrase	Morphology	Translation
West	Present	сэ сэкӀо	сэ с-э-кӀо	I go
West	Past	сэ скӀуагъ	сэ с-кӀу-агъ	I went
East	Present	сэ сокӀуэ	сэ с-о-кӀуэ	I go
East	Past	сэ скӀуащ	сэ с-кӀу-ащ	I went

Negative Polarity: It is dropped in negative forms across all tenses, including the present tense.

Branch	Polarity	Phrase	Morphology	Translation
West	Positive	сэ сэкӀо	сэ с-э-кӀо	I go
West	Negative	сэ скӀорэп	сэ с-кӀо-рэп	I do not go
East	Positive	сэ сокӀуэ	сэ с-о-кӀуэ	I go
East	Negative	сэ сыкӀуэркъым	сэ сы-кӀуэ-ркъым	I do not go

Conditionals and Conjunctions: The addition of suffixes such as -мэ (if), -ми (even if), or adverbial suffixes like -у (while) strips the verb of its dynamic prefix.

Branch	Form	Phrase	Morphology	Translation
West	Standard	сэ сэкӀо	сэ с-э-кӀо	I go
West	Conditional	сыкӀомэ	сы-кӀо-мэ	If I go
East	Standard	сэ сокӀуэ	сэ с-о-кӀуэ	I go
East	Conditional	сыкӀуэмэ	сы-кӀуэ-мэ	If I go

==== The мэ- (ma-) Mutation ====
The morphological placement of the dynamic prefix typically falls between the personal pronoun prefixes and the verb root. However, a significant structural mutation occurs in monovalent intransitive verbs when conjugated for the third person (he/she/it/they).

Because the third-person absolutive index in Circassian is a null prefix (∅-), the dynamic prefix is forced into the absolute word-initial position. Since Circassian phonotactics do not permit the dynamic vowels (-э- or -о-) to stand alone at the beginning of a word without a preceding consonant, the prefix mutates into мэ- (ma-) in both the West and East branches (e.g., ∅-э-кӀо mutates to макӀо).

This mutation is exclusively a feature of the positive present tense, as the dynamic prefix drops out entirely under other conditions. When the dynamic prefix is omitted, the мэ- mutation naturally disappears alongside it, leaving the root exposed:

Non-Present Tenses:

Branch	Tense	Phrase	Morphology	Translation
West	Present	ар макӀо	ар ∅-мэ-кӀо	He goes
West	Past	ар кӀуагъ	ар ∅-кӀу-агъ	He went
East	Present	ар макӀуэ	ар ∅-мэ-кӀуэ	He goes
East	Past	ар кӀуащ	ар ∅-кӀу-ащ	He went

Negative Polarity:

Branch	Polarity	Phrase	Morphology	Translation
West	Positive	ар макӀо	ар ∅-мэ-кӀо	He goes
West	Negative	ар кӀорэп	ар ∅-кӀо-рэп	He does not go
East	Positive	ар макӀуэ	ар ∅-мэ-кӀуэ	He goes
East	Negative	ар кӀуэркъым	ар ∅-кӀуэ-ркъым	He does not go

Conditionals and Conjunctions:

Branch	Form	Phrase	Morphology	Translation
West	Standard	макӀо	∅-мэ-кӀо	He goes
West	Conditional	кӀомэ	∅-кӀо-мэ	If he goes
East	Standard	макӀуэ	∅-мэ-кӀуэ	He goes
East	Conditional	кӀуэмэ	∅-кӀуэ-мэ	If he goes

==== Intransitive Verbs with Spatial Prefixes ====
When a monovalent intransitive verb includes a spatial or directional prefix (such as къ- meaning "hither" or щ- indicating location), the dynamic prefix is sandwiched between this spatial prefix and the verb root. In these environments across all grammatical persons, the ancestral *wa- consistently reduces to -э- in modern West Circassian:

Evolution of the Dynamic Prefix with Spatial Prefixes
Verb Complex	Pre-Modern Form	Ancestral Form	Translation
сы-къ-э-кӀо	*сы-къ-уэ-кӀо	*сы-къэ-уэ-кӀо	I am coming here
у-къ-э-кӀо	*у-къ-уэ-кӀо	*у-къэ-уэ-кӀо	You are coming here
къ-э-кӀо	*къ-уэ-кӀо	*къэ-уэ-кӀо	He/she/it is coming here
сы-щ-э-уцу	*сы-щ-уэ-уцу	*сы-щы-уэ-уцу	I stop there
у-щ-э-уцу	*у-щ-уэ-уцу	*у-щы-уэ-уцу	You stop there
щ-э-уцу	*щ-уэ-уцу	*щы-уэ-уцу	He/she/it stops there

==== Bivalent Intransitive Verbs ====
Bivalent intransitive verbs take an absolutive subject and an oblique indirect object. Because the dynamic prefix sits between the personal pronouns and the verb root in these cases, it is no longer in the word-initial position. Consequently, it never mutates into мэ- (ma-). Instead, it acts as a phonetic glue that often "swallows" or blends with adjacent vowels.

In Proto-Circassian, the underlying dynamic prefix *wa- (уэ-) clustered with the preceding indirect object pronouns. The ancestral combinations for "I look at him", "I look at you", and "I look at y'all" were reconstructed with the prefix sequence absolutive + oblique + dynamic prefix + root. These Proto-Circassian clusters effectively functioned as:

- I look at him: *сы-й-уэ-плъ
- I look at you: *сы-у-уэ-плъ
- I look at y'all: *сы-шъу-уэ-плъ

As the branches diverged, these sequences evolved based on their respective dynamic prefix shifts. In West Circassian, the *wa- simplified to -э-, while in East Circassian, the *w+a contraction resulted in the rounded -о- (creating the intermediate/Eastern forms сы-й-о-плъ, сы-у-о-плъ, and сы-шъу-о-плъ).

Evolution of Bivalent Intransitive Prefixes (Present Tense)
Proto-Circassian	Branch	Phrase	Morphology	Translation
*сы-й-уэ-плъ	West	сэ сеплъы	сэ сы-й-э-плъы	I look at him/it
*сы-й-уэ-плъ	East	сэ соплъ	сэ сы-й-о-плъ	I look at him/it
*сы-у-уэ-плъ	West	сэ уэ суэплъы	сэ уэ с-у-э-плъы	I look at you
*сы-у-уэ-плъ	East	сэ уэ соплъ	сэ уэ сы-у-о-плъ	I look at you
*сы-шъу-уэ-плъ	West	сэ шъуэ сшъуэплъы	сэ шъуэ с-шъу-э-плъы	I look at y'all
*сы-шъу-уэ-плъ	East	сэ фэ сывоплъ	сэ фэ сы-в-о-плъ	I look at y'all

===== Distinguishing the Tense Marker from the Pronoun =====
Because the dynamic prefix drops out in the past tense, it is crucial not to mistake phonetic pronoun contractions for the present tense dynamic marker.

For example, look closely at the East Circassian (Kabardian) past tense for "I looked at you" (сыноплъащ). The "о" here is not the dynamic prefix. The present tense dynamic prefix was dropped. Instead, the "о" in the past tense is the phonetic contraction of the 2nd person singular pronoun уэ blending with the preceding relational prefix (сы-ны-уэ-плъ-ащ).

If we compare the 2nd person singular past tense with the plural form, we can clearly see that the plural form lacks the "о", confirming it was just a pronoun contraction and not a tense marker:

Distinguishing Pronouns from Tense Markers (East Circassian)
Tense	Phrase	Morphology	Translation	Presence of Dynamic Prefix
Present	сэ уэ сыноплъ	сэ уэ сы-ны-у-о-плъ	I look at you	Yes (о = dynamic prefix)
Past	сэ уэ сыноплъащ	сэ уэ сы-ны-уэ-плъ-ащ	I looked at you	No (о sound = pronoun уэ)
Present	сэ фэ сынывоплъ	сэ фэ сы-ны-в-о-плъ	I look at y'all	Yes (о = dynamic prefix)
Past	сэ фэ сынывэплъащ	сэ фэ сы-ны-вэ-плъ-ащ	I looked at y'all	No (Dynamic prefix is absent)

==== Transitive Dynamic Verbs ====
The dynamic prefix is equally present in transitive dynamic verbs operating in the present tense. Just as with intransitive verbs, the ancestral *wa- (уэ-) sits between the personal prefixes and the verb root, undergoing reduction and blending with adjacent sounds:

- 1st Person Singular: с-э-тхы (I write that) < *с-уэ-тхы
- 2nd Person Singular: о-тхы / у-э-тхы (You write that) < *у-уэ-тхы
- 3rd Person Singular: е-тхы / й-э-тхы (He/she writes that) < *й-уэ-тхы < *йы-уэ-тхы

==== Function in Static and Dynamic Counterparts ====
In Circassian grammar, verbs are fundamentally divided into static verbs (expressing a fixed state of being) and dynamic verbs (expressing an action or transition). The dynamic prefix is the central morphological tool used to derive dynamic counterparts from static roots, nouns, and adjectives.

===== Deriving from Nouns and Adjectives =====
The dynamic prefix can be attached to words expressing the quality of an object (adjectives) or a profession (nouns) to create active dynamic verbs. When conjugated in the third-person present tense, these take the мэ- mutation:

- From Nouns: The noun пхъашIэ (carpenter) forms the static phrase ар пхъашIэ (he is a carpenter). Adding the dynamic prefix creates ар мэпхъашIэ (he works/acts as a carpenter).
- From Adjectives: The adjective бзаджэ (evil) forms the static phrase ар бзаджэ (he is evil). Adding the dynamic prefix creates ар мэбзаджэ (he is becoming evil).

===== Terminal Vowel Retention =====
The presence of the dynamic prefix also affects the phonetic structure of the verb's ending. Static verbs in the first and second-person present tense typically drop their terminal vowels (э and ы). In contrast, dynamic verbs bearing the dynamic prefix retain these final vowels.

- Static: сэ сы-щыт (I stand - conveying a state of being)
- Dynamic: сэ сы-щэты (I am standing / I spend time standing - conveying an action)

===== Transitive Static Verbs =====
While most transitive verbs in Circassian are inherently dynamic, the verb Iыгъын (to hold) is a unique bivalent transitive static verb. In its standard present-tense form (с-Iыгъ, "I hold"), it lacks the dynamic prefix because it expresses a state. However, it can take the dynamic prefix to form a dynamic variant, с-э-Iыгъы (derived from *с-уэ-Iыгъы), which instead conveys a habitual or ongoing action ("I hold it generally/often").

=== Dynamic present suffix *-r ===
Proto-Circassian featured a dynamic present tense suffix *-r. This suffix attached exclusively to dynamic verbs (actions or events). Stative verbs (expressing continuous states, such as "to stand") did not take this suffix in Proto-Circassian, and therefore lack any reflex of *-р in their modern paradigms. In the modern normal positive present tense, this suffix has been completely elided in the word-final position in the West Circassian (Adyghe) branch. However, the historical *-r surfaces in both branches under specific morphological conditions where it is protected by a subsequent suffix, preserved in fossilized forms, or kept as an optional marker in East Circassian.

In both West and East Circassian, the -r appears in the negative present form, preceding the negation suffix:

- West: ар кӀорэп, сэ скӀорэп
- East: ар кӀуэркъым, сэ скӀуэркъым

In West Circassian, the suffix is retained in participles, when conjunctions are added, and in certain lexicalized relicts:

- Present participles: кӀорэр (the one who goes, absolutive case), кӀорэм (oblique case), кӀорэмкӀэ (instrumental case)
- Coordination suffix (-i / "and"): кӀори (goes and...)
- Lexical relicts: The suffix has fossilized in certain derived words, such as the noun and adjective стыр ("burn" or "spicy"), which derives from the verb стын ("to burn").

In East Circassian (Kabardian), the suffix is preserved in imperfect forms, interrogatives, participles, lexical relicts, adverbial constructions, and optionally in the positive present tense:

- Optional present tense: Unlike Adyghe, modern Kabardian allows the suffix to optionally surface in standard dynamic verbs in the present tense: сэ сокӀуэ / сокӀуэр ("I go"), ар макӀуэ / макӀуэр ("he goes").
- Imperfect: сэ сефэрт (I used to drink), сэ скӀуэрт (I used to go)
- Interrogative: ар кӀуэрэ пӀэрэ? (does he go?)
- Adverbial form: ар кӀуэурэ (going / as he goes)
- Present participles: The suffix is consistently retained in infinite participle forms: макӀуэр ("the one who goes", absolutive case), сызэрэкӀуэр ("how I go").
- Lexical relicts: Fossilized in certain substantivized participles (nouns and adjectives), such as пшътыр ("hot/hotness"), гъуыр ("dry"), and плъыр ("guard/watchman").

The following table demonstrates the reconstructed Proto-Circassian present tense paradigm using the verb "to go" alongside its modern descendants, illustrating the loss of the word-final *-r:

Present Tense Evolution ("to go")
Person	Proto-Circassian	West Circassian (Adyghe)	East Circassian (Kabardian)
1st sg.	сэ с-уэ-кӀуэ-р	сэ сэкӀо	сэ сокӀуэ
2nd sg.	уэ у-уэ-кӀуэ-р	о окӀо	уэ уокӀуэ
3rd sg.	ар ма-кӀуэ-р	ар макӀо	ар макӀуэ
1st pl.	тэ т-уэ-кӀуэ-р	тэ тэкӀо	дэ докӀуэ
2nd pl.	шъуэ шъу-уэ-кӀуэ-р	шъо шъокӀо	фэ фокӀуэ
3rd pl.	ахэр ма-кӀуэ-хэ-р	ахэр макӀох	ахэр макӀуэ

=== Negative prefix *mə- ===
In Proto-Circassian, verbal negation was primarily marked by the prefix *mə- (мы-). While this prefix survives in both the modern West Circassian (Adyghe) and East Circassian (Kabardian) branches, both languages have innovated by developing additional, distinct negative suffixes for standard indicative verb forms. West Circassian developed the suffix -ep (-эп), while East Circassian developed -q'əm (-къым).

The evolution of Circassian negation created a strict grammatical division between finite (declarative) and non-finite or dependent verbs. The modern negative suffixes entirely took over the standard indicative forms in declarative sentences across the present, past, and future tenses. However, the historical Proto-Circassian prefix *mə- (мы-) is strictly preserved in both modern branches under specific grammatical conditions where the new suffixes cannot be used. Namely, the original prefix remains mandatory in non-finite forms (such as participles and verbal nouns), dependent clauses (such as conditionals and concessives), and non-declarative moods (such as imperatives/prohibitives).

The following table illustrates the divergence toward suffixal negation across standard indicative tenses using the verb "to go" in the third-person singular (ar, "he/she/it"):

Evolution of Negative Indicative Forms ("he does not go")
Tense	Proto-Circassian	West Circassian (Adyghe)	East Circassian (Kabardian)
Present	ар мыкӀуэр	ар кӀорэп	ар кӀуэркъым
Past	ар мыкӀуагъэ	ар кӀуагъэп	ар кӀуакъым
Future	ар мыкӀуэн(у)	ар кӀощтэп	ар кӀуэнукъым

As noted, despite this shift in standard declarative sentences, the historical prefix *mə- is retained in the following constructions:

- Conditionals: Negation within a conditional clause retains the prefix.
  - Positive: кӀомэ (if he goes)
  - Negative: мыкӀомэ (if he does not go)
- Concessives: Similarly, verbs taking the concessive suffix (-i, "even if") use the prefix.
  - Positive: кӀоми (even if he goes)
  - Negative: мыкӀоми (even if he does not go)
- Imperatives: Negative commands (prohibitives) utilize the prefix alongside the second-person index.
  - Positive: КӀо! (Go!)
  - Negative: УмыкӀу! (Do not go!)
- Participles and Verbal Nouns: Infinite verbal forms maintain prefixal negation.
  - Negative participle: мыкӀорэр (the one who does not go)

=== Past Tense in Proto-Circassian ===
In Proto-Circassian, the past tense was historically marked by the suffix *-гъэ (-ğă). Following the split of the proto-language, this suffix evolved differently across the modern Circassian branches. In West Circassian (Adyghe), the original Proto-Circassian suffix is strictly preserved. In East Circassian (Kabardian), however, the suffix underwent a phonetic shift, merging with the preceding vowel to form the long vowel -а.

Linguists N. F. Jakovlev and D. A. Ashkhamaf theorized that this past tense suffix did not originally emerge as a grammatical marker. Through etymological reconstruction, they traced the suffix *-гъэ back to independent primary noun roots related to time—specifically гъэ (meaning "year" or "summer") and гъуэ (meaning "time", "season", or "period"). Over time, these nominal roots grammaticalized, losing their independent lexical meanings to become the standard tense suffix for past actions across the Circassian language family.

The following table illustrates the divergence of the past tense suffix between the modern branches:

Evolution of the Past Tense Suffix
Verb	Proto-Circassian	West Circassian (Adyghe)	East Circassian (Kabardian)
to go (кӀуэн)	*кӀуагъэ	кӀуагъэ	кӀуа
to write (тхын)	*тхыгъэ	тхыгъэ	тха
to read (еджэн)	*еджагъэ	еджагъэ	еджа

=== Future Tense in Proto-Circassian ===
The reconstruction of the future tense in Proto-Circassian (Common Circassian) presents a complex case due to significant divergence between the modern branches. Linguists identify the historical Proto-Circassian future tense as being marked by the suffix *-н (-n). This historical verbal base is highly conservative, phonetically coinciding with—and serving as the direct origin of—the Circassian infinitive (неопределенная форма глагола).

However, the affixes expressing the standard declarative future tense differ drastically between modern West Circassian (Adyghe) and East Circassian (Kabardian), to the point that they cannot be explained by simple phonetic derivation from a single proto-form. West Circassian innovated by developing the suffix -щт (historically -шьт), while East Circassian retained and adapted the historical *-н alongside the declarative suffix -щ (resulting in -нущ for Future I and -нщ for Future II).

The щ in the West Circassian future suffix -щт is etymologically unrelated to the East Circassian suffix -щ. In Kabardian, the -щ is a later morphological innovation appended to the end of verbs to mark affirmative declarative statements. In contrast, the Adyghe щ is an inherent part of the future tense marker itself. In some West Circassian dialects, this suffix is simplified to merely -т (e.g., кӀот), most likely dropping the fricative щ to ease pronunciation.

Despite the divergence in the primary future tense, the historical *-н suffix strictly survives in both branches' secondary future or obligative moods (Future II). Modern Adyghe uses -н for its Future II tense (meaning "must" or "will possibly"). Kabardian utilizes the suffix -нщ (from -н + affirmative -щ) for its Future II tense, while adapting it into the extended suffix -нущ for its primary Future I tense.

The following table demonstrates the divergence in future tense marking using the verb "to go" (кӀуэн) in the third-person singular (ar, "he/she/it"):

Evolution of Future Tense Forms
Tense	Proto-Circassian	West Circassian (Adyghe)	East Circassian (Kabardian)
Future I (Definite)	*ар кӀуэн(у)	ар кӀощт (dial. ар кӀот)	ар кӀуэнущ
Future II (Possible/Obligative)	*ар кӀуэн	ар кӀон	ар кӀуэнщ

A notable piece of evidence for the antiquity of the future tense suffix *-н is its fossilization into everyday vocabulary. Because this tense denoted an action that will happen or is intended to happen, it was historically used to form substantivized verbs (nouns). Several primary Circassian nouns trace their origins directly back to this future tense base:

- шхын ("food" or "meal"): literally "that which will be eaten" (from the root шхы-, to eat).
- тыны ("gift"): literally "that which will be given" (from the root ты-, to give).
- щыгъын ("clothing"): literally "that which will be worn" (from the root щыгъы-, to wear).

=== Fossilized Noun Classes ===
While modern Circassian languages do not have a productive system of grammatical gender or noun classes, Proto-Circassian originally possessed grammatical class markers that distinguished between humans and inanimate objects. According to the comparative-historical research of linguist G. V. Rogava, ancient Circassian noun stems were built using specific class prefixes and determinative suffixes. Over centuries of language development, these class markers either fell off entirely or fused into the roots, becoming a "dead" (fossilized) morphological inventory.

A surviving relic of this Proto-Circassian grammatical class system is found in the interrogative pronouns, which strictly contrast the "human" class from the "thing" (inanimate) class. The initial с- / шъ- in the inanimate forms is a fossilized Proto-Circassian prefix specifically marking the "class of things":

- Human Class: хэт (who?), хэти (anyone / everyone)
- Inanimate Class: сыт / шъыд (what?), сыди / шъыди (anything / everything)

This fossilized inanimate prefix с- is also visible in other interrogative variations, such as the East Circassian (Kabardian) слIо (what?), formed by combining the prefix с- with the interrogative root -лIо. Furthermore, the colloquial variant лIо serves as a prime example of the gradual decay of this obsolete class system. Because the grammatical distinction between humans and things is no longer productive in modern Circassian, the fossilized с- prefix eroded over time in rapid speech, leaving the bare root лIо to function as an independent interrogative pronoun. While all these forms inquire about inanimate objects or concepts, лIо and слIо often carry a more conversational or rhetorical nuance compared to the standard, neutral сыт.

=== Labile Verbs ===
Proto-Circassian featured a distinct class of labile verbs—verbs that were completely neutral regarding transitivity. The exact same verbal root could be used in an ergative construction (as a transitive verb) and an absolutive construction (as an intransitive verb) without any morphological changes to the root. Older Circassian grammars (such as those by Z. Kerasheva and N. Gishev) hypothesized that all transitive verbs in Proto-Circassian were originally labile, but modern linguists like M. Kumakhov and K. Vamling argue against this, proving that many core transitives (like s'’ə-n, "to do", or hə-n, "to carry") were always strictly stable.

Kumakhov and Vamling positively identify a specific set of verbs that were truly labile in Proto-Circassian. These include roots like *z˚e / *ve ("to plough"), *le ("to paint/dye"), *c’ele ("to spread"), and *p’ət’ə ("to press"). This labile nature allowed the exact same root to function in two entirely different syntactic frameworks:

- Transitive (Ergative construction): ЛIы-м щIыгу-р е-жъо (The man is ploughing the field). Here, the verb takes a direct object ("field" in the absolutive case) and the subject is marked with the ergative case (-м).
- Intransitive (Absolutive construction): ЛIы-р ма-жъо (The man is ploughing / engaged in ploughing). Here, no direct object is permitted, and the subject is marked with the absolutive case (-р).

=== Vowel Gradation (Ablaut) for Transitivity ===
According to linguists N. F. Jakovlev and D. A. Ashkhamaf, the strict syntactic division between transitive and intransitive verbs did not exist in the earliest stages of the language. Originally, there was a single, undifferentiated syntactic construction. As the language evolved a need to separate "productive" (transitive/object-affecting) actions from "unproductive" (intransitive) actions, Proto-Circassian developed a system of vowel gradation (Ablaut) at the end of the verbal roots to mark this grammatically.

After the split of the proto-language, many previously labile verbs were forced into "stable" forms using this vowel alternation. The fundamental rule dictated that the base ending in the vowel «ы» (ə) came to designate a transitive action, while the exact same base ending in the vowel «э» (ă) designated a general, intransitive action. This resulted in modern Circassian verb pairs such as:

- тхы-н (to write something, transitive) vs. тхэ-н (to write generally, intransitive)
- ды-н (to sew something, transitive) vs. дэ-н (to sew generally, intransitive)
- шхы-н (to eat something, transitive) vs. шхэ-н (to eat generally, intransitive)

=== The "Amorphous" Noun ===
Before the development of the modern Circassian case system (which uses -m for the ergative and -r for the absolutive), Proto-Circassian went through an "amorphous" stage where nouns lacked formal case affixes entirely. In this ancient period, a bare, uninflected noun was used for all grammatical roles (subject, direct object, indirect object).

As the formal case suffixes (-m and -r) developed later to mark specific syntactic roles and definiteness, the ancient uninflected noun did not disappear. This ancient "amorphous" Proto-Circassian noun survives today as the indefinite form of the noun. Modern Circassian still drops all case endings when a noun is used in a generic, non-specific, or indefinite sense, which is a direct syntactic relic of the proto-language's pre-case era:

- Amorphous / Indefinite Subject: ЛIы мажэ (A man runs) — the noun лIы (man) takes no case marker.
- Definite Subject: ЛIы-р мажэ (The man runs) — the noun takes the absolutive definite marker -р.
- Amorphous / Indefinite Object: Фыз къуажэ кIуащ (A woman went to a village) — the destination къуажэ (village) is completely unmarked.
- Definite Object: Фызы-р къуажэ-м кIуащ (The woman went to the village) — the destination takes the ergative/oblique definite marker -м.

=== Numbers ===
English	Proto-Circassian		Ubykh		Western Circassian		Kabardian	
English	IPA	Cyrillic	IPA	Cyrillic	IPA	Cyrillic	IPA	Cyrillic
One	zə	зы	za	зэ	zə	зы	zə	зы
Two	tʷʼə	тӀу	tʼqʷʼa	ткъӀуа	tʷʼə	тӀу	tʷʼə	тӀу
Three	ɕə	щы	ʂa	шъа	ɕə	щы	ɕə	щы
Four	pɬʼə	плӀы	pʼɬʼə	плӀы	pɬʼə	плӀы	pɬʼə	плӀы
Five	txʷə	тху	ɕxə	щхы	tfə	тфы	txʷə	тху
Six	xə	хы	fə	фы	xə	хы	xə	хы
Seven	bɮə	блы	blə	бльы	bɮə	блы	bɮə	блы
Eight	jə	и	ʁʷa	гъуа	jə	и	jə	и
Nine	bʁʷə	бгъу	bʁʲə	бгъьу	bʁʷə	бгъу	bʁʷə	бгъу
Ten	pʃʼə	пшӀы	ʑʷə	жъуы	pʃʼə	пшӀы	pɕʼə	пщӀы

== Verb Conjugation ==
The Circassian verb is polypersonal: it agrees with each of its core arguments by a personal prefix, filling up to three roles — absolutive (ABS), ergative (ERG) and oblique (OBL). Paradigms are grouped by valency (one, two or three arguments) and by whether the subject is absolutive (intransitive) or ergative (transitive).

This section reconstructs the Proto-Circassian verb and shows how Adyghe (West) and Kabardian (East) developed from it. Nearly all of the divergence comes down to three recurring developments, described first; every example gives Proto-Circassian beside Modern Adyghe, Proto-Kabardian (the reconstructed older eastern stage) and Modern Kabardian.

=== Shared developments from Proto-Circassian ===
==== The present dynamic: the prefix *-уо- and the suffix *-р ====
A dynamic verb (an action, as opposed to a static verb of position or state) marked the Proto-Circassian present twice: a prefix *-уо- before the root and a suffix *-р at the end of the word; with no personal prefix to lean on (a bare 3rd-person subject) the prefix was *мэ- instead. The past had neither. Adyghe dropped -р and fused -уо- into the preceding vowel; Kabardian kept the vowel as -о- but likewise dropped -р in the plain present (it survives only where something follows it — questions, the imperfect). Static verbs never had any of this, so their present is bare in both branches.

The present dynamic vs. static verbs
Meaning	Tense	Proto-Circassian	Adyghe	Proto- Kabardian	Modern Kabardian
I look (dynamic)	Pres.	с-уо-плъэ-р	Сэплъэ	Соплъэ	Соплъэ
he looks (dynamic, 3rd person)	Pres.	мэ-плъэ-р	Маплъэ	Маплъэ	Маплъэ
I sit (static)	Pres.	сы-щыс	Сыщыс	Сыщысщ	Сыщысщ
he sits (static)	Pres.	щыс	Щыс	Щысщ	Щысщ

==== The three plural markers, and their loss in Modern Kabardian ====
The largest difference between the branches is number marking. Proto-Circassian marked a 3rd-person plural separately for each role, with three distinct markers: the absolutive plural suffix *-хэ (Adyghe -х), the ergative plural prefix *я- (vs. singular е-/и-) and the oblique plural prefix *я- (vs. е-). Adyghe keeps all three, and Proto-Kabardian still had them — but Modern Kabardian has lost every one: the verb always uses the singular form, and number rests on the free pronoun (ахэр "they", абыхэм "them"). Many Modern Kabardian forms are therefore syncretic — in each pair below the two eastern forms have fallen together while Adyghe keeps them apart.

The three plural markers
Meaning	Tense	Proto-Circassian	Adyghe	Proto- Kabardian	Modern Kabardian
he looks	Pres.	мэ-плъэ-р	Маплъэ	Маплъэ	Маплъэ
they look (absolutive plural)	Pres.	мэ-плъэ-хэ-р	Маплъэх	Маплъэхэ	Маплъэ
he sees him	Pres.	е-уо-лъэгъу-р	Елъэгъу	Елъагъу	Елъагъу
they see him (ergative plural)	Pres.	я-уо-лъэгъу-р	Алъэгъу	Ялъагъу	Елъагъу
he looks at him	Pres.	е-уо-плъы-р	Еплъы	Йоплъ	Йоплъ
he looks at them (oblique plural)	Pres.	я-уо-плъы-р	Аплъы	Йоплъ	Йоплъ

==== Consonant voicing in Kabardian ====
Kabardian voices Proto's voiceless prefix consonants between vowels in the present — 1sg с- → з-, 1pl т- → д-, 2pl шъу- → ф-/в- — where Adyghe keeps them voiceless.

Kabardian consonant voicing
Meaning	Tense	Proto-Circassian	Adyghe	Proto- Kabardian	Modern Kabardian
I look (1sg с- → з-)	Pres.	с-уо-плъэ-р	Сэплъэ	Соплъэ	Соплъэ
we look (1pl т- → д-)	Pres.	т-уо-плъэ-р	Тэплъэ	Доплъэ	Доплъэ
y'all look (2pl шъу- → ф-)	Pres.	шъу-уо-плъэ-р	Шъоплъэ	Фоплъэ	Фоплъэ

=== The verb classes ===
==== Monovalent intransitive: плъэн "to look" ====
One absolutive subject, one front prefix (1sg сы-/с-, 2sg у-, 1pl ты-/т-, 2pl шъу-; 3rd person Ø). The past suffix is Adyghe -гъ, Kabardian -ащ.

Examples: плъэн "to look"
Meaning	Tense	Proto-Circassian	Adyghe	Proto- Kabardian	Modern Kabardian
I look	Pres.	с-уо-плъэ-р	Сэплъэ	Соплъэ	Соплъэ
I looked	Pst.	сы-плъ-а-гъ	Сыплъагъ	Сыплъащ	Сыплъащ
he looks	Pres.	мэ-плъэ-р	Маплъэ	Маплъэ	Маплъэ
he looked	Pst.	плъ-а-гъэ	Плъагъ	Плъащ	Плъащ
they look	Pres.	мэ-плъэ-хэ-р	Маплъэх	Маплъэхэ	Маплъэ
they looked	Pst.	плъ-а-хэ-гъэ	Плъагъэх	Плъахэщ	Плъащ

==== Monovalent static intransitive: щысын "to sit" ====
The same single absolutive subject, minus all dynamic morphology: the present is bare, closed in Kabardian by the confirmation suffix -щ.

Examples: щысын "to sit"
Meaning	Tense	Proto-Circassian	Adyghe	Proto- Kabardian	Modern Kabardian
I sit	Pres.	сы-щыс	Сыщыс	Сыщысщ	Сыщысщ
I sat	Pst.	сы-щыс-а-гъ	Сыщысыгъ	Сыщысащ	Сыщысащ
he sits	Pres.	щыс	Щыс	Щысщ	Щысщ
he sat	Pst.	щыс-а-гъ	Щысыгъ	Щысащ	Щысащ
they sit	Pres.	щыс-хэ	Щысых	Щысхэщ	Щысщ
they sat	Pst.	щыс-а-хэ-гъ	Щысыгъэх	Щысахэщ	Щысащ

==== Bivalent intransitive: еплъын "to look at" ====
An absolutive subject plus an oblique object (3sg е-, 3pl я-); no ergative. Kabardian loses the oblique plural ("at him" = "at them") and innovates an obligatory directional prefix in some configurations — a 1st-on-2nd object takes the translocative н-.

Examples: еплъын "to look at"
Meaning	Tense	Proto-Circassian	Adyghe	Proto- Kabardian	Modern Kabardian
I look at him	Pres.	сы-е-уо-плъы-р	Сеплъы	Соплъ	Соплъ
I looked at him	Pst.	сы-е-плъ-а-гъ	Сеплъыгъ	Сеплъащ	Сеплъащ
I look at them	Pres.	сы-я-уо-плъы-р	Саплъы	Соплъ	Соплъ
I looked at them	Pst.	сы-я-плъ-а-гъ	Саплъыгъ	Саплъащ	Сеплъащ
they look at him	Pres.	е-уо-плъы-хэ-р	Еплъых	Йоплъыхэ	Йоплъ
they looked at him	Pst.	е-плъ-а-хэ-гъэ	Еплъыгъэх	Еплъахэщ	Еплъащ
I look at you	Pres.	сы-уэ-уо-плъы-р	Сыоплъы	Сыноплъ	Сыноплъ
I looked at you	Pst.	сы-уэ-плъ-а-гъ	Сыоплъыгъ	Сыноплъащ	Сыноплъащ

==== Bivalent static intransitive: тесын "to sit on" ====
A static verb with an oblique object from the possessive series: bare present (Kabardian -щ) and the same oblique-plural loss. In "they sit on them" both plurals stack: the oblique я- and the absolutive -хэ — Modern Kabardian drops both.

Examples: тесын "to sit on"
Meaning	Tense	Proto-Circassian	Adyghe	Proto- Kabardian	Modern Kabardian
I sit on him	Pres.	сы-тес	Сытес	Сытесщ	Сытесщ
I sat on him	Pst.	сы-тес-а-гъ	Сытесыгъ	Сытесащ	Сытесащ
I sit on them	Pres.	сы-я-тес	Сатес	Сатесщ	Сытесщ
I sat on them	Pst.	сы-я-тес-а-гъ	Сатесыгъ	Сатесащ	Сытесащ
he sits on them	Pres.	я-тес	Атес	Ятесщ	Тесщ
he sat on them	Pst.	я-тес-а-гъ	Атесыгъ	Ятесащ	Тесащ
they sit on them	Pres.	я-тес-хэ	Атесых	Ятесыхэщ	Тесщ
they sat on them	Pst.	я-тес-а-хэ-гъ	Атесыгъэх	Ятесахэщ	Тесащ

==== Bivalent transitive: лъэгъун "to see" ====
An ergative agent and an absolutive object. The agent alternates by tense (2sg уэ-/п-, 3sg е-/и-), and both plurals are visible — ergative on the agent, absolutive on the object. The Kabardian root also ablauts (present лъагъу, past лъэгъу), whence the dictionary form лъагъун against Adyghe лъэгъун.

Examples: лъэгъун "to see"
Meaning	Tense	Proto-Circassian	Adyghe	Proto- Kabardian	Modern Kabardian
I see him	Pres.	с-уо-лъэгъу-р	Сэлъэгъу	Солъагъу	Солъагъу
I saw him	Pst.	с-лъэгъу-а-гъ	Слъэгъугъ	Слъэгъуащ	Слъэгъуащ
he sees him	Pres.	е-уо-лъэгъу-р	Елъэгъу	Елъагъу	Елъагъу
he saw him	Pst.	и-лъэгъу-а-гъ	Ылъэгъугъ	Илъэгъуащ	Илъэгъуащ
they see him	Pres.	я-уо-лъэгъу-р	Алъэгъу	Ялъагъу	Елъагъу
they saw him	Pst.	я-лъэгъу-а-гъ	Алъэгъугъ	Ялъэгъуащ	Илъэгъуащ
he sees them	Pres.	е-уо-лъэгъу-хэ-р	Елъэгъух	Елъагъухэ	Елъагъу
he saw them	Pst.	и-лъэгъу-а-хэ-гъэ	Ылъэгъугъэх	Илъэгъуахэщ	Илъэгъуащ
they see them	Pres.	я-уо-лъэгъу-хэ-р	Алъэгъух	Ялъагъухэ	Елъагъу
they saw them	Pst.	я-лъэгъу-а-хэ-гъэ	Алъэгъугъэх	Ялъэгъуахэщ	Илъэгъуащ

==== Trivalent ditransitive: тын "to give" ====
All three roles: an ergative agent, an absolutive theme and an oblique recipient. A linking -ре-/-ри-/-ра- appears between recipient and agent only when both are 3rd person. With a local theme ("I give you…") the theme prefix у- stands first, and the recipient still shows the singular/plural contrast that Modern Kabardian levels ("I give you to him" = "I give you to them").

Examples: тын "to give"
Meaning	Tense	Proto-Circassian	Adyghe	Proto- Kabardian	Modern Kabardian
he gives it to him	Pres.	ре-уо-ты-р	Реты	Ирет	Ирет
he gave it to him	Pst.	ри-т-а-гъ	Ритыгъ	Иритащ	Иритащ
they give it to him	Pres.	ра-уо-ты-р	Раты	Ират	Ирет
they gave it to him	Pst.	ра-т-а-гъ	Ратыгъ	Иратащ	Иритащ
he gives it to them	Pres.	я-ре-уо-ты-р	Ареты	Ярет	Ирет
he gave it to them	Pst.	я-ри-т-а-гъ	Аритыгъ	Яритащ	Иритащ
I give you to him	Pres.	у-е-с-уо-ты-р	Уесэты	Узот	Узот
I gave you to him	Pst.	у-е-с-т-а-гъ	Уестыгъ	Уестащ	Уестащ
I give you to them	Pres.	у-я-с-уо-ты-р	Уасэты	Уазот	Узот
I gave you to them	Pst.	у-я-с-т-а-гъ	Уастыгъ	Уастащ	Уестащ

==== Reflexives ====
When two arguments co-refer, the co-referential slot takes a reflexive prefix — зы- for an absolutive, зэ- for an oblique or recipient — and the verb adds the refactive suffix (West -жьы, East -ж/-ыж); everything else stays as in the plain verb.

Reflexive examples
Meaning	Tense	Proto-Circassian	Adyghe	Proto- Kabardian	Modern Kabardian
he looks at himself	Pres.	зэ-уо-плъы-жьы-р	Зэплъыжьы	Зоплъыж	Зоплъыж
he looked at himself	Pst.	зэ-плъы-жь-а-гъ	Зэплъыжьыгъ	Зэплъыжащ	Зэплъыжащ
they look at themselves	Pres.	зэ-уо-плъы-жьы-хэ-р	Зэплъыжьых	Зоплъыжхэ	Зоплъыж
they looked at themselves	Pst.	зэ-плъы-жь-а-хэ-гъэ	Зэплъыжьыгъэх	Зэплъыжахэщ	Зэплъыжащ
I see myself	Pres.	зы-с-уо-лъэгъу-жьы-р	Зысэлъэгъужьы	Зысолъагъуж	Зысолъагъуж
I saw myself	Pst.	зы-с-лъэгъу-жь-а-гъ	Зыслъэгъужьыгъ	Зыслъэгъужащ	Зыслъэгъужащ
I sit on myself	Pres.	сы-зэ-тес-жьы	Сызэтесыжьы	Сызэтесыжщ	Сызэтесыжщ
I sat on myself	Pst.	сы-зэ-тес-жь-а-гъ	Сызэтесыжьыгъ	Сызэтесыжащ	Сызэтесыжащ

== Schleicher's fable ==
Schleicher's fable in Proto-Circassian:

χʷǝ č́ʷara-gjǝ

χʷǝ ja laśʷam mә q́ˤ:an

č́ʷara pǝʎ́an;

mǝ χwanǝta k:ʷǝm q:irǝ,

mǝ čʷǝχʷa čʷam,

mǝ ć̣ǝm pasa mǝš́ʷrǝ.

χʷǝ č́ʷara q̇́ˤan:

"źǝʁʷǝ sā ǵʷǝ,

q:ać̣am ć̣arǝ č́ʷara ḳ́ʷarǝ."

č́ʷara q̇́ˤan: "q:́ˤʷa χʷǝ!

źǝʁʷǝ š́a ǵʷǝ ć̣arǝ,

q:ać̣a, ł́a, č́ʷara laśʷam

ʎ́ʷa ḳ́ač̣ʷǝm čǝ-wǝ,

χʷiara-gjǝ laśʷam mә q́ˤ:a."

nǝ q:́aˤʷasa χʷǝ rǝq:ʷada q:ˤʷan.

== See also ==
- Proto-Abazgi language
- Proto-Northwest Caucasian language
