= Proto-Northwest Caucasian language =

Reconstructed ancestor of the Northwest Caucasian languages

Proto-Northwest Caucasian
- Proto-West Caucasian; Proto-Abkhaz-Adyghe
- Reconstruction of: Northwest Caucasian languages
- Lower-order reconstructions: Proto-Abazgi; Proto-Circassian

Proto-Northwest Caucasian (sometimes abbreviated PNWC), also called Proto-West Caucasian (PWC) or Proto-Abkhaz-Adyghe, is the reconstructed common ancestor of the Northwest Caucasian languages.

== Phonology ==
=== Vowels ===
Proto-Northwest Caucasian, just like its descendants, had a very small vowel inventory, most commonly reconstructed as consisting of 2 vowels: /a/ and /ə/. Some degree of allophony might have existed, especially near labialized and palatalized (or both) consonants.

Some scholars assume that the rich consonantal distinctions appeared from a formerly rich vowel inventory, so **/Cy/ would result in */Cʷʲə/, **/Co/ in */Cʷa/ (or possibly /Cˤʷa/), and so on. However, this view is doubted due to the tendency of vowel systems to get richer over time, and the opposite being much more rare.

=== Consonants ===
There was a primary four-way distinction of almost all obstruents in Proto-Northwest Caucasian. The following variations have been proposed:

- Geminate /Cː/, plain /C/, ejective /Cʼ/ and voiced /C̬/;
- Unaspirated /C˭/, aspirated /Cʰ/, ejective /Cʼ/ and voiced /C̬/;
- Fortis /C͈/, lenis /C͉/, ejective /Cʼ/ and voiced /C̬/.

The only living descendants to have kept the 4-way distinction are the Shapsug and Bzhedug dialects. They both feature an unaspirated /C˭/, aspirated /Cʰ/, ejective /Cʼ/ and voiced /C̬/ distinction, where all the remaining languages have merged them to plain /C/, ejective /Cʼ/ and voiced /C̬/.

Additionally, there also were distinctions in labialization, palatalization and pharyngealization (and, depending on the analysis, aspiration), with combinations of those also possible, such as in case of */q(ʰ)ˤᶣ/, */q˭ˤᶣ/, */qʼˤᶣ/.

==== Starostin & Nikolayev (1994) ====
The table of consonants below is adapted from Starostin & Nikolayev (1994), who developed a unique phonetic orthography for the Caucasian languages. The following differences compared to IPA notation for consonants can be observed:

	S&N (1994)	IPA
Fricatives	ϑ, δ	θ, ð
Fricatives	š, ž	ʃ, ʒ
Fricatives	š́, ž́	ɕ, ʑ
Fricatives	λ, L	ɬ, ɮ
Affricates	c, ʒ	ts, dz
Affricates	č, ǯ	tʃ, dʒ
Affricates	č́, ǯ́	tɕ, dʑ
Affricates	ƛ, Ł	tɬ, dɮ

For airstream mechanism, phonation, and secondary articulation:

	S&N (1994)	IPA
unaspirated (tense)	◌:	◌˭
palatalized	◌́	◌ʲ
labio- palatalized	◌́ʷ	◌ᶣ
pharyngealized	◌Ɪ	◌ˤ
ejective (glottalized)	◌̇/◌̣	◌ʼ

Voiceless consonants that are unmarked are aspirated ⟨◌ʰ⟩.

Consonants in parentheses ⟨(C)⟩ are considered to have unreliable reconstruction; labialization in parentheses ⟨C(ʷ)⟩ marks a transfer of labialization onto an adjacent vowel. The exact meaning of consonants with a question mark in parentheses ⟨(?) or (C?)⟩ is not explained; it is unclear if it is used to indicate presumptive value or for dubiousness.

Pairs of consonants separated by a slash ⟨C/C⟩ have known distribution, while those separated by a tilde ⟨C~C⟩ have unknown distribution. Consonants preceding a hyphen ⟨C-⟩ occur in initial position.

Reconstructed consonants and sound shifts adapted from Starostin & Nikolayev (1994)
Proto-NWC	Proto-Abazgi	Ubykh	Proto-Circassian
*p	*p	p	*p
*p˭	*b	b	*p˭
*b	*b	b	*b
*pʼ	*pʼ	pʼ	*pʼ
*f	*f	f	*x(ʷ)
*w	*w	w	*w
*m	*m	m	*m
*pʲ	*p	tʷ	*t
*p˭ʲ	*b	(dʷ~tʷ)	*t˭
*bʲ	*b	dʷ	*d
*pʼʲ	*pʼ	tʼʷ	*tʼ
*pʷ	*p	f	*p
*bʷ	*f	f	*b
*pᶣ	*tsʲ	tʷ	
*bᶣ	*dzʲ	dʷ	*d
*pʼᶣ	*tsʼʲ	tʼʷ	*tʼ
*pˤ	*p	vˤ	*p
*p˭ˤ		bˤ	*p˭
*bˤ	*b	bˤ	*b
*pʼˤ		pʼˤ	*pʼ
*mˤ	*m	mˤ	*m
*t	*t	t	*t
*t˭	*d	d	*t˭
*d	*d	d	*d
*tʼ	*tʼ	tʼ	*tʼ
*r	*r	d-, r~ʁ	*t˭-, *r
*n	*n	n	*n
*rʲ	*r	ɮ	*dz
*tʷ	*tʷ	tʷ	*tʰ
*t˭ʷ	*d(ʷ)	tʷ	t˭
*dʷ	*dʷ	dʷ	*d
*tʼʷ	*tʼʷ	tʼʷ	*tʼ
*tᶣ	*tʷ		*ts
*tʼᶣ	tʼʷ	tʼʷ	tsʼ
*ts	*ts	ts	*s-, *ts
*ts˭	*ts	ts	*ts˭
*dz	*dz	dz	*dz~*z
*tsʼ	*tsʼ	tsʼ	*tsʼ
*s	*s	s	*s
*z	*z	dz~z	*z
*tsʲ	*tsʲ	tsʲ	(*s)
*ts˭ʲ	*dzʲ(?)	tsʲ	*ts˭
*dzʲ	*dzʲ	dzʲ	*dz~*z
*tsʼʲ	*tsʼʲ	tsʼʲ	*tsʼ
*sʲ	*sʲ	sʲ	*s
*zʲ	*z	dzʲ~zʲ	*z
*tsʷ	*tsʷ	tsʷ	sʷ-
*ts˭ʷ	*tsʷ	tsʷ	*ts˭ʷ
*dzʷ	*dzʷ		*dzʷ
*tsʼʷ	*tsʼʷ	tsʼʷ	*tsʼʷ
*sʷ	*sʷ	sʷ	*sʷ
*zʷ	*zʷ	dzʷ~zʷ	*zʷ
*tsᶣ	(*tʃ)		*tsʲ
*dzᶣ	*dʒ~*ʒ	dʒʲ	*dzʲ
*tsʼᶣ	*tʃʼ	tʃʼʲ	*tsʼʲ
*sᶣ	*sʲ	tʃʷ	*sʲ
*zᶣ	*dzʲ~*zʲ	ʒʷ	*zʲ
*tʃ	*tsʲ	ts	*s
*dʒ	*dzʲ	dz	*dz~*z
*tʃʼ	*tsʼʲ	tsʼ	*tsʼʲ(?)
*ʃ(~*ʃ˭)	*sʲ	s	*s
*ʒ	*zʲ	z	*z
*tɕ	*tɕ	tɕ	*tɕ
*tɕ˭	*dzʲ(~*tɕ)	tɕ	*tɕ˭
*dʑ	*dʑ	dʑ	*dʑ~*ʑ
*tɕʼ	*tɕʼ	tɕʼ	*tɕʼ
*ɕ	*ʃ(?)	ɕ	*ʃ
*ɕ˭	*ʃ	ɕ	*ʃ˭
*ʑ	*ʒ	ʑ	*ʒ
*j	*j	j	*j
*tʃʷ	*tʃ	tʃ	*tɕ
*tʃ˭ʷ	*zʷ	tʃ	*tɕ˭
*dʒʷ	*dzʷ~*zʷ	dʒ	*dʑ~*ʑ
*tʃʼʷ	*tʃʼ	tʃʼ	*tɕʼ
*ʃʷ	*sʷ	ʃ	*ʃ
*ʃ˭ʷ	*ʃ	ʃ	*ʃ˭
*ʒʷ	*zʲ(?)	ʒ	*ʒ
*tɕʷ	*tʃ	tɕ	*tʃ
*tɕ˭ʷ	*dʒ~*ʒ	tɕ	*tʃ˭
*tɕʼʷ	*tʃʼ	tɕʼ	*tʃʼ
*ɕʷ	*ʃʷ	ʃʷ	*sʲ
*ɕ˭ʷ	*ʃ	sʷ	*ʃ˭
*ʑʷ	*ʒʷ	ʒʷ	*zʲ
*tɬ	*x	ɕ	*tɕ
*tɬ˭	*ts	(sʲ)	*tɕ˭
*dɮ	*l	ɮ	*tħ
*tɬʼ	*x/*tsʼ	tsʼʲ	*tɕʼ
*ɬ		sʲ	*ɕ
*ɬ˭	*x	sʲ	*ɕ˭
*l	*l	d-, ∅~j	*tħ-, *ɮ
*tɬʲ	*xʲ	*ɕ	*tɕ
*dɮʲ	*ɣʲ	ʁ(~zʲ)	*ɣ
*tɬʼʲ	*ɕ	tɬʼ	*tɬʼ
*ɬʲ(~*ɬ˭ʲ)	*ɕ	ɬ	*ɬ
*ɮʲ	*ʑ	ɮ	*ɮ
*lʲ	*r-, *l~*ɣʲ	ɮ	*d-
*tɬʷ	*tsʷ	tsʷ	*tʃ
*tɬ˭ʷ	*tsʷ	tsʷ	*tʃ˭
*dɮʷ	*l	w	*ħ
*tɬʼʷ	*tsʼ(ʷ)	tsʼ(ʷ)	*tʃʼ
*ɬʷ	*ʃ	sʷ	*x(ʷ)
*ɬ˭ʷ	*ʃ	s(ʷ)	*ɕ˭
*tɬᶣ	*tʃʷ	f	*x
*tɬ˭ᶣ	*ʒʷ	dʑ	*tɕ˭
*dɮᶣ	*dʒʷ	dʒ	*dɮ
*tɬʼᶣ	*tʃʼʷ	tsʼ	*tɕʼ
*ɬᶣ(~*ɬ˭ᶣ)	*ʃ	ʃʷ	*x(ʷ)
*ɮᶣ	*ʒ	ʒʷ	*ɣʲ
*k	*k	kʲ	*kʲ
*ɡ	*ɡ	ɡʲ	*ɡʲ
*kʼ	*kʼ	kʼʲ	*kʼʲ
*x	*x	ɕ	*x
*ɣ	*ɣ	ɣ~ʁ	*ɣ
*kʲ	*kʲ		*kʲ
*ɡʲ	*ɡʲ	ɡʲ	*ɡʲ
*kʼʲ	*kʼʲ	kʼʲ	*kʼʲ
*xʲ	*xʲ	sʲ	*ɕ
*ɣʲ	*ɣʲ	zʲ	*ʑ
*kʷ	*kʷ	kʷ	*kʷ
*k˭ʷ	*ɡʷ	ɡʷ	*k˭ʷ
*ɡʷ	*ɡʷ	ɡʷ	*ɡʷ
*kʼʷ	*kʼʷ	kʼʷ	*kʼʷ
*xʷ	*xʷ	x	*x(ʷ)
*ɡᶣ	*ɡʷ	ɡʲ	*ɡʷ
*kʼᶣ	*kʼʷ	kʼʲ	*kʼᶣ
*xᶣ	*sʷ	xʲ	*xʷ
*ɣᶣ(?)	*zʷ	ʁʲ	*ʁʷ
*q	(*ħ)	q	*q-
*q˭	*q	q	*q˭
*ɢ	*ɣ	ʁ	*ʁ
*qʼ	*qʼ	qʼ	*q˭
*χ	*ħ	χ	*χ
*ʁ	*ʕ	ʁ	*ʁ
*q˭ʲ	*q	qʲ	
*ɢʲ	*ɣʲ	ʁʲ	
*qʼʲ	*qʼʲ	qʼʲ	*ʡ
*χʲ	*ħ	xʲ	*χʲ
*ʁʲ	*ʕ	ʁʲ	*ʁ
*qʷ	*ħʷ	qʷ	*qʷ-, *q˭ʷ
*q˭ʷ	*qʷ	qʷ	*q˭ʷ
*ɢʷ	*ɣʷ	ʁʷ	*ʁʷ
*qʼʷ	*qʼʷ	qʼʷ	*q˭ʷ
*χʷ	*ħʷ	χʷ	*χʷ
*ʁʷ	*ʕʷ	ʁʷ	*ʁʷ
*qᶣ	*ħ(ʷ)	xʲ	*qʷ-
*q˭ᶣ		qʲ	*q˭ʷ
*ɢᶣ	*ɣ(ʷ)	ʁʲ	*ʁʷ
*qʼᶣ	*ʕʷ (*qʼʷ?)	qʼʲ	*ʡʷ
*χᶣ	*ħ(ʷ)	χʲ	*χʷ
*ʁᶣ	*ʕ(ʷ)	ʁʲ	*ʁʷ
*q˭ˤ	*ʕ		*q˭
*qʼˤ	*ħ(?)	qʼˤ	*q˭
*χˤ		χˤ	*χ
*ʁˤ	*ʕ	ʁˤ	*ʁ
*qˤʲ	*q	q(ˤ)	*ħ
*q˭ˤʲ	*ʡ	qʼ	*ʡ
*qʼˤʲ	*ħ	qʼ	*ʡ
*χˤʲ	*ħ	χ(ˤ)	*ħ
*ʁˤʲ	*ʕ	ʁ	*j
*qˤʷ	*ħʷ	χˤʷ	*qʷ-
*q˭ˤʷ	*ʕʷ	qˤ(ʷ)	*q˭ʷ
*qʼˤʷ	*qʼʷ (*qʷ)	qʼˤʷ	*q˭ʷ
*χˤʷ	*ħʷ	χˤʷ	*χʷ
*ʁˤʷ	(*ħʷ?)	ʁˤʷ	*ʁʷ
*qˤᶣ	*qʷ	χʷ	*ħ
*q˭ˤᶣ	*ʕʷ	qʼʷ	*ʡʷ
*qʼˤᶣ	*ħʷ	qʼʷ	*ʡʷ
*ʁˤᶣ	*ʕʷ	w	*w~*ʁʷ

== Grammar ==
=== Numbers ===
English	Proto-NWC Schulze	Proto-NWC Colarusso	Proto-Abazgi	Abkhaz	Abaza	Ubykh	Proto-Circassian	Adyghe	Kabardian
One	za	–	za-kʼə	akʼə	zakʼə	za	zə	zə	zə
Two	tʼqʷʼa	tʼqʼo	ʕʷ-ba	ɥ-ba	ʕʷ-ba	tʼqʷʼa	tʷʼə	tʷʼə	tʷʼə
Three	λ:ə	(y-)x̂ə/a	χ-ba	χ-ba/x-ba	χ-ba	ʂa	ɕə	ɕə	ɕə
Four	pʼλʼa	–	pɕ-ba	pɕ-ba	pɕ-ba	pʼɬʼə	t͡ɬə	pɬʼə	pɬʼə
Five	sx̂ʷə	(w-/y-)ćx̂ə	χʷ-ba	χʷ-ba/xʷ-ba	χʷ-ba	ɕxə	txʷə	tfə	txʷə
Six	ɬʷə	(w-)x̂cə	tʃʷba?	f-ba	t͡s-ba	fə	xə	xə	xə
Seven	bδə	ɣə́	bəʑ-ba	bəʑ-ba	bəʑ-ba	blə	bɮə	blə	bɮə
Eight	–	(w-/y-)ɣə/a	aʕ-ba	aa-ba	aʕ-ba	ʁʷa	jə	jə	jə
Nine	bğʷʲə	ɣə́	–	ʑʷ-ba	ʒʷ-ba	bʁʲə	bʁʷə	bʁʷə	bʁʷə
Ten	bćʷʼə	(p-/w-)źə́/źá	–	ʑʷa-ba	ʒʷa-ba	ʑʷə	pʃʼə	pʃʼə	pɕʼə

== Vocabulary ==
English	Proto-NWC	Proto-Abazgi	Abkhaz	Abaza	Ubykh	Proto-Circassian	Adyghe	Kabardian
I	–	sa/sarˈa	sa/sarˈa	sa/sarˈa	səsan	sa	sa	sa
Heart	ɡʲʷə	ɡʷə	ɡʷə	ɡʷə	ɡʲə	ɡʷə	ɡʷə	ɡʷə
Sea	–	–	–	–	ɕʷa	xə	xə	xə
They sell it	–	–	–	–	aːɕan	–	jaːɕan	jaːɕan
I go	–	–	–	–	skʲʼan	skʷʼan	skʷʼan	skʷʼan
I say	–	–	–	–	sqʼan	–	sʔʷan	sʔʷan
Language/tongue	bǝźA	bzǝ	aːbz	bzǝ	bza	bza	bza	bza
Red	–	–	–	–	pɬə	pɬəʑ	pɬəʑ	pɬəʑ
Book, Letter	–	–	–	–	txəɬ	txəɬ	txəɬ	txəɬ
top of the back	–	–	–	–	txə	txə	txə	txə
Ox	c:ʷǝ	t͡sʷə	á-ć̌	t͡ʃʷə	t͡sʷə	t͡sʷːə	t͡sʷə, t͡ʃʷə	və
Blood	–	–	–	–	ɬa	ɬə	ɬə	ɬə
Month/Moon	–	–	aːmza	məzə	məʒa	maːza	maːza	maːza
Beard	–	–	–	–	ʒaːkʲʼa	ʒaːkʲʼa	ʒaːt͡ʃʼa	ʒaːt͡ʃʼa
Dust	–	–	–	–	saːpa	saːpa	saːpa	saːba
Barefoot	–	–	–	–	ɬapsʼə	ɬapsʼa	ɬapt͡sʼa	ɬapt͡sʼa
Donkey	–	–	–	–	t͡ʃədə	ʃədə	ʃədə	ʃədə
Hedgehog	–	–	–	–	pəzʲə	pəʐ	pəʐ	–
Water	–	–	–	–	bzə	psə	psə	psə
Fault	–	–	–	–	laːʑa	laːʑa	laːʑa	laːʑa
House	ʁ́Iʷǝna	–	–	ʕʷna	–	wəna	wəna	wəna
Mother	(a)nǝ	(a)nǝ	á-n	anǝ	na	aːna	nə	aːna
Father	(a)ṕ:ǝ	ab	ab	aba	tʷǝ	at:a	tǝ	aːda
heavy	anǝTa	xanǝta	á-χ́anta	χ́anta	–	want:aʁʷ	wantaʁʷ	wandaʁʷ
cattle-shed	anǝTa	bawǝ-ra	bora	a-bóra, -bówra	bow	–	–	bow
guest	–	–	–	–	pč̣́a	ħa-č̣́á	ħaṣ́a	ħāč̣́a
mountain / hill	bǝɣA	–	bʁa	–	–	bɣǝ	bɣǝ	bɣǝ
measles / scarlet fever / navel	bǝč̣́ǝ	bǝč̣́ǝ	a-bč̣́ǝ́	bč̣́ǝ	bǝč̣́ǝ́	–	nǝbǝǯ́	bǝnža
dust / bubble / blister	bǝbǝ	–	á-bǝb	–	–	psǝ-bǝb	psǝ-bǝb	psǝ-bǝb

== See also ==
- Proto-Circassian language
- Proto-Abazgi language
