= Talostan of Kabardia =

Talostan Jankhot

Grand Prince of Kabardia (disputed)
- Reign: c. 1490s
- Predecessor: Mirza of Kabardia
- Successor: Unknown

Prince of the Principality of Talostaney
- Reign: c. 15th century – 1537/1538
- Predecessor: Office established
- Successor: Tepsaruqo Talostan
- Born: Unknown
- Died: 1537/1538; Mount Kyzburun, Kabardia
- Issue: Sozoruqo; Tepsaruqo; Qardanmirza
Names
- Talostan, son of Jankhot
- Kabardian: Жанхъуэт и къуэ Талъостэн
- House: Inalid dynasty; House of Talostan (Founder)
- Father: Jankhot I of Kabardia

Talostan Jankhot (Kabardian: Жанхъуэт Талъостэн), was a Circassian prince associated with early political struggles in Kabardia. He appears in both written and oral traditions, where he is linked to conflicts over leadership, shifting alliances, and the formation of early princely domains. Written sources describe him as having ties to the Great Horde and later involvement in internal Kabardian power disputes, while oral traditions portray him as a notable warrior figure connected to major campaigns and regional raids. His historicity and chronology remain uncertain, and accounts of his life vary across sources.

== Biography ==
=== Written sources ===
According to the Arabic manuscript al-‘Uqūd al Jawhariyya fī al Mahāsin al Dawla al Ashrafiyya al Ghawiyya (shortened as AS 3313), Talostan, referred to in the manuscript as Tau Sultan, spent part of his early life among the Great Horde Tatars. The source only states that Qeytuqo's brother Tau Sultan was in the Horde, though the exact nature of his stay there remains unclear. Historian Inga Druzhinina suggests that this may reflect the Circassian custom of atalykism, which was widespread among Circassian nobility.

Following the end of the conflict between Qeytuqo Jankhot and Jilakhstan, the rivalry was continued by their relatives. According to the manuscript, Talostan migrated to Kabardia together with a Tatar force and claimed the title of Grand Prince of Kabardia, entering into conflict with Mirza, the son of Jilakhstan.

Druzhinina compares Talostan’s appearance in Kabardia with reports sent to Moscow by the Russian ambassador Ivan Loban Kolychev from Crimea in 1492. In the spring of that year, Loban Kolychev reported that “the Horde was plowing the fields in Kum and went, they say, to fight in Cherkasy.” Later that autumn, he provided a more detailed account:

“The Horde was, they say, migrating to the Pyatma Mountains; and they say, the uluses behind the Horde did not migrate, but migrated, they say, to the Volga; and they say, the Horde went behind the uluses to the Volga. And now... they say that the Horde is very hungry, they have no grain, and they say that they went to the Volga to find something to feed themselves with; but they say that their stomachs have disappeared”

Druzhinina further argues that Talostan’s return from the Horde to Kabardia and his struggle against the son of Kilak Sultan Mirza likely took place before the defeat of the Great Horde by the Crimean Khan Meñli I Giray in 1502 and probably before the summer of 1498, when Russian sources recorded that “the Cherkassians came to the Great Horde and, they say, beat a lot of Tatars of the Great Horde.” She therefore dates Talostan’s return and the subsequent civil conflict that resulted in the partition of Kabardia to approximately 1491–1492.

The manuscript AS 3313 states that the Kabardian princes eventually reached an agreement under which half of Kabardia would belong to Mirza and the other half to Talostan. According to the same source, Talostan later rejected this arrangement, murdered the “young” Mirza, and seized control of the entire country.

=== Oral history ===
==== Domain in Lesser Kabardia ====
Very little is known about the foundation of Talostaney and the House of Talostan, which were traditionally attributed to Talostan Jankhot. According to later tradition, Kabardia was once a single political entity, with its division placed by some narratives in the 13th–15th centuries, during the Christian period. In one legend, two brothers, Jilakhstan and Beslan, agreed to divide their possessions in order to rule independently: the elder remained in Baksan, while the younger established his residence along the Terek. Talostan, described in these accounts as a restless and unpredictable figure, is said to have had strained relations with his brothers and to have moved frequently across the North Caucasus. After returning to Kabardia in a position described as unfavorable, he organized repeated raids on their territories, taking livestock and captives. In response, an agreement among the elders reportedly forced concessions from Jilakhstan, whose lands were more exposed to incursions. Following this settlement, the territory to the left of the Terek became known as Talostaney.

==== Bakhchisarai campaign ====
According to Circassian oral tradition, an expedition against the capital of the Crimean Khanate, Bakhchisarai, was organized following complaints from Kabardian women regarding the coarse cloth they were required to produce and wear.

The following passage from the song Bakhchisarai Campaign (Бахъшысэрей зекӏуэ) mentions Talostan Jankhot:

The communities are gathering, and Talostan is our commander;

His jokes lifted the spirits of the fallen riders.

Talostan knew how to bring his comrades back alive from the campaign;

With his own two hands, he could pull the tightest of bows.

According to narrative tradition, the force led by Talostan crossed into the Crimean Peninsula, advanced inland while avoiding major fortified positions, and moved toward Bakhchisarai. The raid is described as sudden, with parts of the city being plundered and several residences and storehouses set on fire. The raiders are said to have returned with prisoners, livestock, and other valuables. As Crimean reinforcements advanced from Qırq Yer and Kefe, Talostan ordered a withdrawal. The Kabardian detachment retreated to the coast and crossed back across the strait.

==== Death ====
After the death of Beslan the Fat, a civil war is said to have broken out in Kabardia during which Talostan claimed leadership over the entire region.

In the course of this conflict, Yidar Yinarmas, a Kabardian prince from Western Circassia, is said to have assembled a large coalition army from several Western Circassian tribes, thereby strengthening his political legitimacy beyond dynastic claims. This coalition included the Bzhedugs, Zhaney, Kheghach, and Makhosh.

The Battle of Kyzburun is described as having been particularly bloody for both sides, with heavy losses among the princely elites. Among those reported killed was Talostan Jankhot. After the battle, Yidar was recognized as the Grand Prince of Kabardia. He obtained the right to settle freely within Kabardian territory, and the region under his authority, particularly the basin of the Cherek River, became known as "Yidarey". The Kabardian princes acknowledged his authority and agreed that rebellion against his rule would be punishable by death. Yidar died not long after these events.

== Sources ==
- Druzhinina, Inga A.; Iliushina, Milana Yu; Kabardov, Inal B. (2024-12-23). "NOBILITY AND POWER IN 15TH-CENTURY KABARDA ACCORDING TO THE SOURCE "PRECIOUS NECKLACES CONCERNING MERITS OF THE STATE OF AL-ASHRAF AL-GHAWRI"". History, Archeology and Ethnography of the Caucasus (in Russian). 20 (4). doi:10.32653/CH204772-782. ISSN 2618-849X.
- Druzhinina, I. A. (2024). Chkhaidze, V. N. (ed.). ByzantinoCaucasica. Выпуск 4 Поход шейха Хайдара на Северный Кавказ 1486 г. и два раздела Кабарды [Sheikh Haydar's Campaign to the North Caucasus in 1486 and Two Divisions of Kabarda] (in Russian). Moscow: Institute of Oriental Studies RAS. ISBN 978-5-907845-12-1.
- Kozhev, Zaurbek A. (2018). Бахчисарайский поход (Бахъшысэрэй зекӀуэ): проблема датировки [The Bakhchisarai Campaign (Bakhshyserei Zekue): The Problem of Dating] (PDF). Vestnik KBIGI (in Russian) (4 (39)). doi:10.31007/2306-5826-2018-4-39-45-54.
