= House of Tokhtamish (Circassian family) =

Tokhtamish Тохъутэмыщ
- Circassian house of aristocratic origin
- Tamga of Tokhtamish
- Parent family: Inalid
- Country: Circassia (historical); Kabardia (historical); Russian Empire (historical); Mountain Republic (historical); Soviet Union (historical); Russia; Kabardino-Balkaria
- Etymology: Tokhtamysh
- Place of origin: Circassia; Kabardia; Greater Kabardia
- Founded: 16th c.
- Founder: Prince Tokhtamish
- Titles: Prince (demoted); First-rank noble (historical)

The House of Tokhtamish (Kabardian: Тохъутэмыщ, Russian: Тохтамышев) (Note: Alternative spellings: (Kabardian: Дохъутэмыщ, Тохътэмыш, Тэхъутэмыш), Takhtamishev, Tokhtomishev, (Russian: Тахтамышев, Тохтомышев, Тохтамыш)) was a noble Kabardian house that was deprived of its princely status. They were the only Kabardian dynasty to lose their princely title. (Note: Pshitekhu (Kabardian: Пщытеху) is a traditional practice that refers to the removal of a prince or a group of princes from their princely position. The word is derived from the combination of pshi, meaning "prince," and tekhun, meaning "to overthrow" or "to dismiss." Among the Kabardians, this tradition changed after the Tokhtamish princes, and instead of being thrown, the prince(s) would be exiled from Kabardia.) Like other Kabardian princes, the Tokhtamish family descended from Inal the Great.

== History ==
In the mid-16th century, Saramirza, the son of Tokhtamish was elected as the Grand Prince of Kabardia after the death of Inarmas's son, Grand Prince Idar. According to oral sources, as a result of a civil war between princes, Prince Tokhtamish which was the founder of the family and his son Bezruqo were exiled from Kabardia. The area where they were exiled was near the present-day city of Cherkessk, and the river where they settled was known among the local people as Tokhtamiships (officially Abazinka). Other place names (Note: Tokhtamish Heights (Тохтамышские высоты) Ust-Tokhtamish Outpost (Усть-Тохтамышского поста) Tokhtamish Pristavstvo (Тохтамышское приставство)) were also derived from the name of this river.

Idar, a Kabardian prince seeking to reclaim inherited lands had formed an alliance with the Western Circassian principalities. He supported the exiled Tokhtamish family and brought them to his side. In the Battle of Kyzburun, fought between Idar's supporters and his rival Kabardian princes, Idar’s army won, restoring influence in Kabardia and allowing the Tokhtamish family to return. Prince Tokhtamish and his son Kalish were among five princes killed in the battle. Tokhtamish’s death caused significant internal conflict within the dynasty.

In the second half of the 17th century, the Tokhtamish princes began to display an arrogant and condescending attitude toward the people, plunder neighboring villages, and act with malice toward other princely dynasties. These behaviors provoked strong reactions from other Kabardian princes and the general population. As a result, through a collective conspiracy by the princes (Note: Hatokshoqo, Misost, Qeytuqo and Bechmirza princely families.) and with the participation of the people, the majority of the male members of the Tokhtamish family were killed. According to a custom, people who met princes on the road had to accompany them until the prince allowed them to leave. This practice was usually directed at elders but was applied to everyone regardless of age when it came to the princes. The Tokhtamish family used this custom excessively by forcing villagers to use their heavily loaded carts for long distances in their service. According to a letter from a Tokhtamish leader Jambot in 1858 to the Kabardia regional head V. V. Orbeliani, at that time, a conspiracy was formed by the joint decision of the princely houses to eliminate the Tokhtamish family due to their "cruel and autocratic" behavior at that time.

According to oral sources, upon learning about the conspiracy, Prince Qeytuqo Tokhtamish hid in a forest near the Malka River. Attacks against the Tokhtamish princes were organized by princes and peasants, and most were killed. The lands belonging to the Tokhtamish Principality around the Nalchik and Baksan rivers were divided. Saramirza, son of Duvey who was still a baby, the women and a few others were spared. The remaining members accepted being reduced from princely status to first-rank nobility (Tlekotlesh) and became vassals of the Hatokhshoqo princes. The lands allocated to the Tokhtamish's could not be sold or used as a loan, unlike other first-rank nobles.

After some time following the destruction of the family, the cabin where Qeytuqo Tokhtamish hid was discovered by a group of hunters. The Kabardian princes sent 500 people and declared that they allowed Qeytuqo to return and live as a prince on the condition that he was "well-intentioned" and would "offend no one." A few years after his return, Qeytuqo voluntarily gave up his princely rights and lowered himself to the first-rank noble class. The forest area where he hid became known among the local people as Qeytuqo.

In 1744, Saramirza, son of Duvey, wrote a petition to Russian Empress Elizaveta Petrovna requesting the restoration of his family’s princely rights and the return of 25 villages, but could not reach a result. At that time, the Tohtamishey village was one of the poorest villages in Kabardia; therefore, the Tohtamish nobles remained politically and economically weak. Mehmed-Girey from the Tokhtamish family supported the establishment of Russian protection over Kabardia to strengthen his political power, arguing its necessity in relation to the foundation of Mozdok which was the start of the Russo-Circassian War. For his pro-Russian stance, he was rewarded by Empress Catherine II. Following the Russian invasion of Kabardia by the Russian Empire in 1825, leader of the Tokhtamish village Kambot Tokhtamish (born 1795/1796) which was a vassal of Prince Aliy Hatokhshoqo migrated to Western Circassia. In 1832, Kambot joined the army of 700 warriors led by the Chemguy grand prince Jembulat Boletoqo. After being wounded in a battle, he was captured by the Russians but escaped from prison with seven other prisoners and returned to Western Circassia. Under the protection of Lieutenant Misost Hatokhshoqo, Kambot was pardoned and returned to Kabardia with his family. He died shortly afterward in the Karachay region.

After Kambot's migration, his step-brother Anzor became the leader of the Tokhtamish village. In 1842, he moved the village (modern-day Lechinkay) 2 kilometers north. Anzor served in the Russian Army and reached the rank of rittmaster. In the 1850s, a dispute arose between Anzor and Jambot (Kambot’s son) over the division of the village and claims of rights. During this period, a conflict between the lower-ranking Kushha nobles, Yakub and Jambot brothers, who were loyal to the Tokhtamish family, and Anzor Tokhtamish escalated into a blood feud, resulting in Anzor’s death. A folk song (Note: Kushha Jambot and Yakub’s lament (Kabardian: Къущхьэ Жамботрэ Екъубрэ я тхьэусыхэ), is widely known in Circassian oral tradition. As the conflict escalated, following Anzor’s insults and accusations against the Kushha nobles, Kushha Yakub’s brother Jambot was killed. In response, Yakub killed Anzor in March 1859 and fled, but he was later surrounded by the Russian soldiers in his hiding place and killed by artillery fire. The song depicts the Kushha side as the righteous.) based on this blood feud has survived and has been studied by folklorists such as Zaramuk Kardangushev.

In the mid-19th century, there were three villages belonging to the Tokhtamish family, all located along the Chegem River:

Village	Household	Population (1842)
Tokhtamishey (Tokhtamish Anzor's village)	–	–
Tokhtamish Jambot's village (Note: Due to conflicts with his uncle Anzor, Jambot left Tokhtamishey and founded a new village with his subjects.)	19	169
Tokhtamish Muhammad-Mirza's village	42	282

In 1865, following the reform to merge Circassian villages with smaller settlements, Tokhtamish Jambot's village and Kazansh village were merged with the Tokhtamish Muhammad's village.

During the Soviet era, members of Kabardian aristocratic families who still held leadership roles within their local community were labeled as "enemies of the people" and subjected to political repression. Many were punished without committing any crimes. Anzor, the eldest son of Tokhtamish leader Jambot, died after being exiled to Siberia. Jambot’s younger son, Muhammed, who was the leader of his village during the Tsarist period, died following his exile in 1928. Muhammed’s eldest son Tatu was executed in December 1937. Muhammed's younger son Inal, born in 1925, served 10 years in a Siberian Gulag until an amnesty. Their close relative Seferbi Tokhtamish was executed in 1937. All of them were accused of anti-kolkhoz agitation and were rehabilitated in 1989; rehabilitation applies only to those found to have been wrongfully accused.

== Genetics ==
The Tokhtamish lineage primarily continues in the village of Lechinkay in Kabardino-Balkaria. The family members commonly exhibit the G2a1 haplogroup, specifically the G-PF6789 subclade.

Although there are Circassians bearing the Tokhtamish surname in Syria and Ersakon village in Karachay-Cherkessia, these families are considered distinct from the Kabardian Tokhtamish's and are believed to have derived their name from the Tokhtamish River. DNA tests involving one individual from each of the three settlements showed that the individuals from Syria and Ersakon are genetically close to each other, but no close genetic relation was found with the individual from Lechinkay. According to a theory, Kuban Tokhtamish's are descended from Kambot.

== Genealogy ==
The patrilieneal family tree of Prince Tokhtamish, the founder of the lineage:

Inal the Great
Tabuldu
Qirqilish
Tokhtamish

== Notable members ==
- Tokhtamish (?–16th c.), founding prince of the family and one of the commanders in the Battle of Kyzburun.
- Saramirza Tokhtamish (?–16th c.), Grand Prince of Kabardia.
- Anzor Aslanukovich Tokhtamishev (1810/1811–March 17, 1859), rittmaster in the Russian Army and a member of the Kabardian Temporary Court.
