= Qalebatuqo Hatuqay =

Circassian politician and military commander

Qalebatuqo Hatuqay Shupako
- Къэлэубатыкъо Хьатыкъуай ШIупакIо

Confederate Leader of Circassia (de jure)
- In office 1807–1827
- Preceded by: Office established
- Succeeded by: Ismail Berzeg (de facto)

Personal details
- Party: National Oath

Military service
- Allegiance: Circassian Confederation
- Battles/wars: Russo-Circassian War

Qalebatuqo Hatuqay Shupako (Adyghe: Къэлэубатыкъо Хьатыкъуай ШIупакIо) was a Circassian politician and military commander who served as the leader of the Circassian Confederation from 1807 to 1827. He took part in the Russo-Circassian War. He is called "Kalabat-Oku Hatukwoi" by James Bell.

== Biography ==
=== Early life ===
Not much is recorded about Qalebatuqo, as Circassians did not write down their history, and all knowledge comes from Russian and British sources. He had a brother named Kushmud. His exact birth date is not known. Of Circassian Natukhaj nobility, he was raised with a martial education.

==== Name ====
His name was Hatuqay and he was a nobleman of the House of Shupako belonging to the Qalebatuqo sub-branch.

=== Participation in the Russo-Circassian War ===
Qalebatuqo was a respected person all around Circassia and fought in the Russo-Circassian War.

=== Leadership ===
In 1807, Shupako Qalebatuqo self-proclaimed himself as the leader of the Circassian confederation, and divided Circassia into 12 major regions. These regions were Shapsugo-Natukhaj, Abdzakh, Chemguy, Barakay, Bzhedug, Kabardo-Besleney, Hatuqay, Makhosh, Bashilbey, Taberda, Abkhazia and Ubykh.

In 1827, Ismail Berzeg officially declared the military confederation of the Circassian tribes. By the end of 1839, he managed to unite a significant part of the population under his control. His nominal reign therefore came to an end.

=== Death ===
His death circumstances are not recorded in Russian, British or Circassian sources, and remain unknown.
