= Battle of Kyzburun =

- Part of Kabardian civil wars
Date	1537 / 1538 (according to Kojev)
Location	Near the Kyzburun Mountain, on the right side of Baksan River
Result	Yidar's coalition's victory
Territorial changes	Establishment of the Principality of Yidarey; Migration of Besleneys to Urup Valley; Establishment of the Principality of Besleney

Belligerents
Yidar's coalition Principality of Bzhedug; Principality of Makhosh; Principality of Zhane; Principality of Kheghache; Principality of Besleney; Principality of Chemguy (in variants)	Kabardian princes Abazins

Commanders and leaders
Yidar; Yelzheruqo Khimish; Altay Bagharsuqo †; Qanoqo Beslan; Tokhtamish †; Jandjeriy Kurghoqo	Talostan Jankhot †; Dudaruqo †; Aybak †

Strength
Unknown, estimated at least 10,000 – 12,000	Unknown, estimated at least 10,000 – 12,000; 3,000 Abazin infantry

The Battle of Kyzburun (Kabardian: Къызбрун зауэ) was a decisive civil conflict recorded in oral tradition that took place in mid-16th century Kabardia (dated to 1537 / 1578 by Zaurbek Kojev) (Note: Zaurbek Kojev is a Candidate of Historical Sciences and Head of the Medieval and Modern History Sector at the IGI KBSC RAS.) to determine central authority in the region. Based on the folkloric accounts, battle was fought between Prince Yidar, who sought to reclaim his paternal inheritance with a large coalition of Western Circassian principalities, and the Kabardian princes supported by Abazin allies. According to one version, the conflict was driven by the Kabardian princes' attempt to establish sovereignty over Besleneys.

Different estimates suggest it may have occurred in the second half of the 16th century or the beginning of the 16th century.

== Background ==
Following the death of Inal, his descendant princes began claiming rights over the rule of Kabardia. Prince Yidar, having been raised by his maternal grandfather, the Bzhedug prince Yelzheruqo Khimish, after the death of his father Inarmas, was deprived of his inherited lands. While in Bzhedughia, Yidar rose to prominence through his military skills and personality. He became a respected figure in Western Circassia and was compared to Inal by the people.

In a different version of the events, the conflict was a struggle for independence between the Kabardian and Besleney princes. In this account, the primary cause was the attempt by Kabardian princes to establish sovereignty over the Besleney based on their descent from Inal’s eldest son. The Besleney resisted these claims, asserting that their own lineage from Inal’s son Beslan granted them equal noble status.

Approximately two years before the Battle of Kyzburun, a major civil war broke out among the princes in Kabardia aimed at seizing central authority. During this process, Prince Tokhtamish (the founder of the House of Tokhtamish) and his family were exiled from Kabardia. This exile provided a legal opportunity for intervention for Yidar, who had been waiting in the Bzhedug region. Although Yidar appeared as a "mediator" to defend the rights of the exiled Tokhtamish and ensure peace, his primary goal was to reclaim his paternal inheritance. Dissatisfied with Talostan's policies and seeking to maintain their independence, Beslan's son Qanoqo also joined Yidar's coalition. In a variant, Besleneys and their allies also sought support from the Crimean Khanate. Prince Talostan, which was the founder of the House of Talostan, was the most prominent leader of the Kabardian side. He was one of the most influental figures claiming control over Kabardia. He is considered the organizer of a successful and large-scale expedition to Bakhchisarai, the capital of Crimea, in 1535 or 1536, shortly before the Battle of Kyzburun. This victory solidified his political ambitions and his authority over Kabardia.

== War preparations ==
Yidar gathered a massive army from Western Circassians, establishing political legitimacy rather than relying only on kinship. This coalition included the Bzhedugs, Chemguys, (Note: In a variant noted by Baron Karl F. Stal.) Zhane, (Note: Although Nogmov refers to them as Shapsug, it is considered that they were the Zhane tribe, which was their historical equivalent at that time.) Kheghach, and Makhosh. Battle songs emphasize the scarcity of Bzhedug cavalry.

To prevent bloodshed, Yidar sent a delegate and proposed a division of the Kabardian people among the contending princes and a peace agreement, but this proposal was rudely rejected by the Kabardian princes. Enraged by the rejection, Yidar burned villages to force the people to his side; as a result, Kabardian forces began defending themselves and retreated to the vicinity Kyzburun Mountain on the right bank of the Baksan River. The Kabardian princes, hesitant to face Yidar's army in open field, took a defensive position and sought help from allies. Approximately 3,000 Abazin infantry joined this defensive line. They established a fortification on the Baksan River and used overturned carts as defensive structures.

According to Shora Nogmov, the Kabardian princes relied mostly on the Abazins while preparing for the war. This reliance was because of the kinship ties by the legendary prince Inal, whose first wife was the daughter of the renowned Abazin prince, "Ashev". The Kabardian princes mobilized not only princes and nobles but also the peasants.

Considering the mobilization capacities of the period, it is estimated that each side deployed at least 10,000 to 12,000 troops onto the field.

== Battle ==
The Kabardian princes took a defensive position near Kyzburun Mountain on the right bank of the Baksan River, where they constructed defensive structures. The Chemguy and Bzhedug warriors were noted for their performance in the field. The coalition forces utilized carts to breach the Kabardian defensive lines and fortifications.

Nogmov described the battle with the following words:

"The massacre was terrible; the residents covered in ashes and all the people were letting out horrific screams and wails, shedding tears like rivers during the battle. Some wore Easter molds on their heads for protection. Tradition says that countless lives were lost from both sides at this site. Among the fallen princes were: Talostan, Aybak, Dudaruko, and Tokhtamish along with his son Kilish."

Some parts of the song about the battle:

Blood flows like a river in Kyzburun, Our horsemen ride like Narts, gripping their reins tight. The brave Yelzher of the Khimish, Idar is your foster son.

Qanoqo’s helmet gleams in the battle, An arrow has pierced the forehead of Bagharsuqo Altay. Aksakal of Chasabi whets his sword, He shatters the fort gate with his great battle-axe.

The village of Baghirsa is engulfed in flames, On the battlefield, the people of Dygulybgey weep amidst the army, The hearts of the seven vanguards are torn apart by sword strikes.

The Bzhedug horsemen, though few, are like a plague, The horse-riding grandsons of Qanoqo have left Kurghoqo's horses behind. Idar’s golden shield is riddled with arrows.

== Aftermath ==
Yidar's coalition won the battle but couldn't achieve a decisive victory. The exhausted Kabardian side proposed a peace treaty, which Yidar accepted. Under the terms of the agreement, Yidar was recognized as the "Grand Prince of Kabardia". Yidar earned the right to settle anywhere he wished in Kabardia, and the region he ruled (the Cherek basin) began to be known as "Yidarey". The Kabardians committed to his authority and agreed that any defiance of his rule would be met with capital punishment.

One of the political consequences of the battle was the migration of Prince Qanoqo, son of Beslan, from Kabardia to the Urup valley with approximately 200 families. This is one of the legends describing the emergence of the Besleney tribe. The battle laid the foundation for political ties between the Qanoqo and Yidar houses, rooted in the fact that their progenitors fought side by side at Kyzburun. According to a version of the battle, while there was still a minor heir of Beslan, the Kabardian princes sought to exert authority over Beslan's subjects. Beslan's subjects requested help from the Western Circassians, which subsequently led to the outbreak of the battle. The Kyzburun epic functioned as a genealogical record where the inclusion of specific family names verified noble lineage.

Furthermore, the House of Tokhtamish never fully recovered after the death of Tokhtamish, ultimately leading to events that resulted in the removal of their prince title and the elimination of most branches. This battle permanently shifted political authority in Kabardia in favor of Yidar and his descendants, a family that played a central role in diplomatic relations established with the Tsardom of Russia throughout the 16th century.

It is suggested by some historical accounts that the House of Yidar may have granted the Bzhedugs annual rights to cultivate and harvest lands within Kabardia as a reward for their critical military support, potentially attempting to integrate them into the local socio-political structure.

The rise of Yidar through the support of Western Circassian tribes left a lasting negative impression in the historical memory of the Kabardian people. This reliance on external forces created a lingering "crisis of psychological legitimacy" for the House of Yidar. The victory triggered a violent, decades-long power struggle and blood feuds between the House of Yidar and the rival Qeytuqo and Talostan houses, who refused to accept Yidar’s centralized authority.
