= Bakhchisarai campaign =

Circassian campaign in Bakhchisarai against Crimean Khanate

- Part of Crimean–Circassian wars
Date	Disputed; Second half of 1523 (B.Kh. Akbashev); Summer or spring, 1535 / 1536 (Z.A. Kozhev)
Location	Bakhchisarai, Crimean Khanate
Result	Circassian victory

Belligerents
Kabardia (East Circassia)	Crimean Khanate

Commanders and leaders
Talostan Jankhot; Andemirkan	Sahib I Giray

Strength
c. 2,000–3,000 horsemen	Unknown

The Bakhchisarai campaign (Kabardian: Бахъшысэрей зекIуэ) was a Kabardian military raid against the Crimean Khanate in approximately 1535–1536. The event is considered legendary because it is recorded only in the folklore of the peoples of the Caucasus, other sources do not mention the Circassian campaign in the Crimea.

== Dating ==
The dating of the Bakhchisarai Campaign remains disputed among scholars. According to B. Kh. Akbashev, the campaign should be dated to the second half of 1523, the year of the death of Mehmed I Giray, when the Crimean Khanate was experiencing internal turmoil. Akbashev argues that this political instability explains both the absence of references to the campaign in Russian diplomatic sources and the apparent lack of effective Crimean resistance to the invasion.

This interpretation has been challenged by Z. A. Kozhev, who notes that Bakhchisarai did not yet exist in 1523. It was Sahib I Giray who, in 1532, transferred the khan’s residence from the village of Salarchik, located approximately two kilometers downstream along the Churyuk-Su River, to a new site that later became known as Bakhchisarai (“Garden-Palace”). Kozhev therefore considers a date prior to 1532 unlikely. Kozhev further links the upper chronological limit of the campaign to a major feudal conflict in Kabarda that culminated in the Battle of Kyzburun. According to Circassian tradition, Talostan, described as the leader of the Bakhchisarai Campaign, was killed in this battle. The Battle of Kyzburun is dated to 1537 or 1538.

In addition, both legendary narratives and poetic texts describing the campaign suggest that it was not conducted as a traditional winter march across the frozen Kerch Strait, but rather involved a maritime crossing. One such text contains the line:

И пищӀэгъуэлешхуэри кхъухышхэ пхащӀекӀэ нытхузэрашэри (“They carry him on a large white horse on the deck of a large ship.”)

Taking into account the political situation within the Crimean Khanate and the risks associated with autumn and winter navigation on the Black Sea, Kozhev proposes that the campaign most likely occurred in the spring or summer of 1535 or 1536, when Sahib Giray faced significant internal difficulties due to ongoing civil strife within the khanate.

== Campaign ==
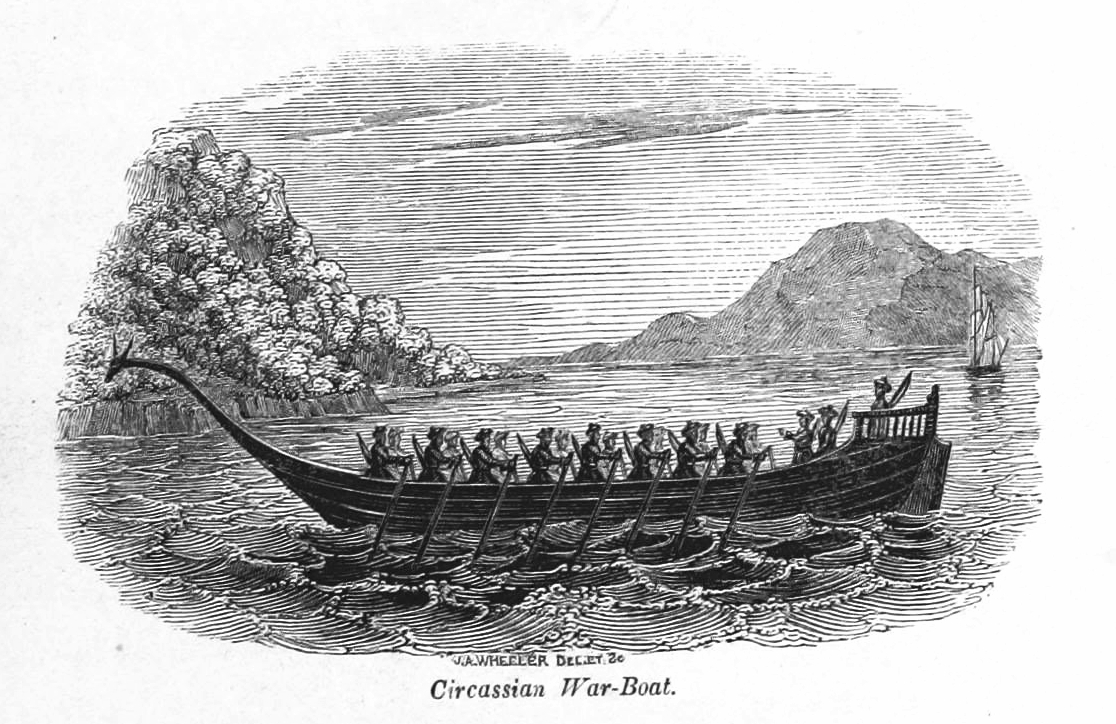
Illustration of a Circassian war galley from the 19th century

According to Circassian folklore, the expedition was organized in order to obtain fine fabrics in Crimea after Kabardian women complained about the coarse cloth they were required to produce and wear.

In assessing the size of the force involved, Z. A. Kozhev notes that the various appanages of Kabarda in the mid-17th century were capable of fielding approximately 7,000 to 8,000 horsemen, roughly one third of whom were professional warriors. He argues that for the 1530s such numbers make the scenario of a large-scale invasion of Crimea improbable. Even a winter campaign across the frozen Kerch Strait would have involved significant risk in the event of confrontation with the full Crimean field army. A maritime crossing between Taman and Crimea by a force of that scale would have presented serious logistical difficulties within the framework of Kabardian feudal military organization.

Kozhev therefore considers it more likely that the expedition was carried out by a smaller force, estimated at 2,000 to 3,000 well-trained wark (knight) cavalry. Such a detachment would have been capable of conducting a rapid strike against the khan’s residence while maintaining the mobility necessary for withdrawal. In this interpretation, transport across the strait would have been feasible for a limited force.

According to the narrative tradition, the force under Talostan crossed to the Crimean Peninsula, advanced inland while avoiding major fortified positions, and moved directly toward Bakhchisarai. The raid is described as sudden, with parts of the city plundered and several residences and storehouses set on fire. The raiders reportedly returned with prisoners, livestock, and valuable goods.

As Crimean reinforcements approached from Qırq Yer and Kefe, Talostan ordered a withdrawal. The Kabardian detachment retreated to the coast and crossed back over the strait. Kozhev also notes that Ottoman military presence in Crimea at the time was limited. In the early 16th century, the Ottoman governor of Kaffa commanded approximately 500 horsemen, including around 200 Circassian mercenaries.

=== Song ===
The poetic texts associated with the Bakhchisarai Campaign contain references to the fighting near the khan’s residence and to acts of plunder. These verses emphasize the daring character of the raid and the symbolic humiliation of the Crimean ruler. Lyrics of the song:

И пщӏэгъуалэшхуэри кхъухьышхуэ пхащӏэкӏэ нытхузэрашэри,
И хъарзынашэмэ къуэбыдэ шытхр неубэри.
Мы жылагъуэбэр зэхуосри ди Талъостэнри ди самыржакъыт,
И сэмыркъом шу хутыкӏуахэри дишыжырт.
Гъусэ шэжыным ди Талъостэнри хуэкӏуэзэти,
Бээм я нэхъ гуащӏэр и къуэлакъитӏкӏэрэ зэхуишэрт.
И шэтыр лъабжьэ гущэти Борэжьеяпщэм щӏелъэсри,
Бахъшысэрейри а махуэм къуапиблт.
Бахъшысэрей гущэри къуапиблти,
Мы гъущӏ пщэхъуиблыр хъаныжь гъумым пщӏэхэвдзэ.
Хъаныжьмэ ипхъутэкъэ Кустэхъан дахэри,
Щауэ хэллъыхьти дыщэ тахътэм и щхьэм щогъуэг.
Пщӏэгъуалэжьыдзэри хы тӏуащӏэми ныдошэсыкӏри,
— Зы сэбэп къыхэмыкӏынуми, мэждыт хужыжьым сафӏэкӏуэлӏэнщ! — жиӏащ Андемыркъан.

Translation:

They carry his big white horse on the hull of a large ship;
The edges of the impassable gorge flatten beneath his goodness.
The communities are gathering, and Talostan is our commander;
His jokes lifted the spirits of the fallen riders.
Talostan knew how to bring his comrades back alive from the campaign;
With his own two hands, he could pull the tightest of bows.
The fierce Bora wind blows through his tent;
Bakhchisarai on that day had seven corners.
Bakhchisarai had seven corners;
Throw these seven collars onto the neck of the unkind, fat Khan!
The daughter of the unkind Khan, the beautiful Kustahan, picky in grooms,
Is weeping on a golden throne.
A powerful army on white horses enters the Interfluve;
"Even if there is no benefit, I will make my way to the Great White Mosque!" said Andemirkan.

== Sources ==
- Kozhev, Zaurbek A. (2018). Бахчисарайский поход (Бахъшысэрэй зекӀуэ): проблема датировки [The Bakhchisarai Campaign (Bakhshyserei Zekue): The Problem of Dating] (PDF). Vestnik KBIGI (in Russian) (4 (39)). doi:10.31007/2306-5826-2018-4-39-45-54.
