= Beslan the Fat =

Supreme Prince of Kabarda

Beslan Jankhot
- Beslan the Fat

Grand Prince of Kabardia
- Reign: 16th century
- Predecessor: Inarmas of Kabardia
- Successor: Idar of Kabardia
- Born: c. 1470; Kabardia
- Died: c. 1530s Kabardia
- Issue: Qeytuqo
- Father: Jankhot I of Kabardia
- Military career
- Nickname: The Fat
- Conflicts: Crimean–Circassian wars; Capture of Astrakhan (1532); Raid on Derbent

Beslan Jankhot (Kabardian: Беслъэн Жанхъуэт), nicknamed Beslan the Fat (Kabardian: Беслъэн ПцIапцIэ) in Circassian oral history, was a Kabardian prince associated with the ruling dynasty descended from Inal the Great. He appears prominently in Circassian oral history, particularly in the cycle of songs and legends about the hero Andemirkan, where he is portrayed as a powerful but physically corpulent ruler. Despite being unable to ride a horse and reportedly traveling in a cart due to his extreme obesity, he is depicted as an influential political leader who organized military campaigns and governed Kabardia.

== Appearance ==
Adyghe, and especially Kabardian, aristocrats, according to numerous testimonies and established stereotypes, embodied the image of chivalrous and skilled warriors, endowed with a stern, graceful beauty and a humble brutality. In the Andemirkan cycle of songs and legends, Prince Beslan's nickname is given as "fat" (пцӀапцIэ). Shora Nogmov, in his work "History of Adyghe People", provides the following description of Beslan:

Prince Beslan Kaitukovich Dzhankhot was gifted with remarkable corpulence and stature. His generous nature, which poured out its gifts upon him in abundance, also rewarded him with intelligence and excellent abilities; his commands always ended with success. Unfortunately, due to his size, he always traveled by cart.

Beslan's physical condition is explained in folklore in different ways, including advanced age, poor health, or both. Both explanations appear in the folklore material of the Andemirkan cycle. The tales describe Beslan as a large and obese man who could not move without leaning on two sticks. It is also stated that in earlier years he had been a horseman but was no longer capable of participating in military campaigns. One episode even speaks of Beslan's physical disability and the absence of his lower limbs. Most episodes of the narrative focus not on explaining the reasons for the prince's condition but simply on emphasizing that he was "out of shape". Because of his extreme obesity, Beslan is described as traveling not on horseback but in a cart. Some versions of the tales note that he did not merely sit in the cart but lay on a featherbed. Beslan's method of hunting is also described in the cycle: he remained seated in the cart without descending to the ground while beaters drove the game toward him, allowing him to shoot from his position. The Andemirkan cycle further portrays him as a poor marksman, as he could barely turn and was unable to react quickly to the movement of a running animal.

== Life ==
Though Beslan's birth date is unknown, Samir Khotko, based on his reconstruction of the chronology of Inal the Great, estimates that he was born around 1470. At the turn of the 16th century, Kabardia was divided into several principalities which were named after their rulers: Idarey, Beslaney, Talostaney, and Jilakhstaney. According to legend, Beslan lived in the second half of the 15th century and represented the fourth generation of the lineage of Inal: Inal – Tabula – Jankhot – Beslan. Inal's son Tabula had three sons: Inarmas, Jankhot, and Minbulat. Jankhot himself had two sons: Beslan and Talostan.

=== Campaigns ===
Although Beslan was not a horseman in the literal sense of the word due to his physical condition, he nevertheless acted as an organizer and leader of military expeditions. Rather than remaining inactive, he organized and directed a noble army and invited the warrior Andemirkan to participate in one of his campaigns. Despite relying on such warriors, the responsibility for the success of the expeditions ultimately rested with Beslan himself. According to folklore traditions, he pursued an active policy of expansion in the Lower Terek basin.

Adyghe folklore further claims that during his leadership Kabardian forces reached as far as Astrakhan and Derbent. Beslan is also said to have formed an alliance with the Shamkhalate, the largest feudal domain in Dagestan, and for a long time ensured the security of trade routes connecting Astrakhan and Derbent with Kabardia.

In 1532, Ak-Kubek fled to Kabardia and appealed to Beslan for assistance. Beslan gathered a strong army and marched on Astrakhan with the aim of capturing the city and restoring Ak-Kubek to the throne. The forces were joined by the Principality of Hatuqay, led by a prince nicknamed "the Pale", and probably also by the Chemguy, who traditionally acted in alliance with them. During the campaign the Kabardian warrior Andemirkan reportedly distinguished himself by being the first to cross the Volga and by killing the opposing commander during the capture of Astrakhan. In the ensuing battle the Adyghe forces captured the city, killing Kasim and many of his supporters. This event was also reflected in Russian chronicles:

"Having arrived at Aztorakan, the Cherkasy, unknown to anyone, took Astrakhan, killed the tsar and princes, plundered their possessions, and departed. And Tsarevich Ak-Kubek began to rule in Astrakhan."

On the return journey from the campaign, Beslan reached Derbent and formed an alliance with local Dagestani rulers. During the return march he also raided the city and captured a caravan of Iranian merchants.

=== Role in assassination of Andemirkan ===
More than 100 recorded songs and tales about Andemirkan are known, most of which feature Prince Beslan. According to these folklore narratives, Andemirkan repeatedly publicly insults Beslan. However, Beslan does not respond to these attacks with immediate indignation or punishment. In traditional Kabardian society, regardless of status, all individuals were expected to adhere to law, tradition, and custom, with social norms prevailing over the individual. Within this framework, the personal qualities of the prince were considered essential in maintaining stability. In the narratives, Beslan is portrayed as a ruler who maintains control of the situation and skillfully directs the princes and nobles of Kabardia, ensuring their support for his position. The story of the confrontation begins when the Supreme Prince invites Andemirkan to join a campaign against Astrakhan. While the hero waits in the prince's residence for the expedition to begin, Beslan behaves somewhat discourteously toward his guest. He examines Andemirkan's bow, drawing it several times before remarking that although it is not bad, it is "a bit weak." Although offended, Andemirkan remains silent. Later, during a hunt attended by Beslan and his entourage, a memorable incident occurs.

During the hunt, the game pursued by Andemirkan flees toward Beslan, who, due to his extreme obesity, travels not on horseback but in a cart. In one version of the tale, Andemirkan shoots an arrow that pierces a deer (or a bear in other variants) and strikes the wheel of Beslan's cart, pinning it to the axle so that it stops turning. Afterward he mocks Beslan, saying: "Ah, fat Beslan, whose bow is carried by a cart, how did you like the flight of my arrow?" Beslan remains silent, regarding the insult as a fair retaliation for his earlier remark about Andemirkan's bow. The narrative then shifts to the siege of Astrakhan, in which Andemirkan distinguishes himself. After the successful raid, the warriors return to congratulate Beslan, who waits on his cart at some distance from the battlefield. When Andemirkan approaches him, he greets him mockingly with the words: "Long live, mistress!" The insult deeply offends Beslan, although he does not openly reveal his anger. The tales attribute to Beslan the following thoughts: he could forgive the earlier insult because he had provoked it himself, but this new mockery was unprovoked. According to the narrative, Beslan therefore swears to take revenge.

Beslan does not immediately punish Andemirkan but instead carefully prepares his reprisal. He convenes a meeting of the princes and presents the issue before them, employing the traditional collegial mechanisms of Kabardian political life. Discussions reportedly focus on Andemirkan's behavior and his violation of established norms. Beslan is said to have conducted private negotiations with those who would eventually carry out the execution, persuading them to lure Andemirkan into a trap. According to folklore, the princely brothers Kanbolat and Aslambek were friends of Andemirkan. At some point Aslambek disappeared, and rumors spread that Andemirkan was responsible for his death. One version of the story claims that Aslambek had been visiting Andemirkan and that the latter, unable to present appropriate gifts to his guest and unwilling to disgrace himself, killed him. Kanbolat, however, did not believe these rumors and remained loyal to his friend. Learning that Andemirkan intended to visit Kanbolat, Beslan secretly arrived beforehand and reminded him of the rumors surrounding his brother's death, suggesting that the blood had not been avenged. Beslan argued that Kanbolat had greater reason than any of the other Kabardian princes to consider Andemirkan an enemy. According to the tale, he urged Kanbolat to assist in a plot organized by the princes to destroy him:

"In their [other princes'] name and in my own, I ask you not to lag behind us, your closer relatives, among whom you live and who can at any time show more sympathy and be more useful to you than Aydemirkan, who long ago betrayed the oath he gave you," Beslan said. "Do not exchange us, your brothers, for an unreliable friend and fulfill our request. Since he can only trust you alone of all of us, then give us the opportunity to attack him by surprise and destroy him, so that he cannot cause us great harm."

Kanbolat expressed doubts about the truth of the accusations against Andemirkan and was reluctant to violate the oath of friendship he had sworn. Nevertheless, fearing the hostility of the other princes, he ultimately yielded:

"But your enmity is more terrible for me than breaking an oath, and I, God knows, will fulfill your wish only if forced by necessity,"

Beslan then forced Kanbolat to swear that he would not break his word and explained to him the plan devised by the Kabardian princes for Andemirkan's death. In the folklore tradition, Andemirkan's killing is thus presented as a planned execution organized by Beslan, who could not openly challenge the hero to a duel. The rhetoric of the songs and tales generally favors Andemirkan: his bravery and heroism are portrayed as justifying his arrogance and protecting him from public condemnation. Beslan, by contrast, is depicted as acting through calculated political maneuvering rather than direct confrontation.

== Reforms ==
Historically, Adyghe Khabze has undergone multiple reforms to adapt to the changing needs of the Circassian community. Significant reforms of Adyghe Khabze were led by Beslan the Fat.

Beslan introduced a number of rituals among the Kabardians and divided the population into five classes according to the ranks of the uzden: 1) tlohotlesh, 2) dizhinugo, 3) kodz, 4) pshish-ork or berslan-ork, and 5) uork sshaotluh-gussa. Collectively, these groups were known as uork. The peasantry was divided into four categories: 1) pishkeu (pshikeu), meaning "princely"; 2) okgo or tlaoksynao, meaning "serf"; 3) dlagunpit or dlhokotl, meaning "peasant"; and 4) unaut, meaning "household man".

The term tlohotlesh (instead of tlabkuesh) is a three-syllable word with two possible meanings. The first is "from three noble generations", which may refer to families that were more numerous and wealthy. The second derives from the two-syllable form tlabkussh, meaning "from three courageous families". Dizhinugo is a compound word formed from dizhin and go, meaning "yellow silver"; members of this group were of princely descent but belonged to a lower rank. Kodz (instead of kodze), meaning "addition", is believed to refer to immigrant foreign nobles. Pshish-ork or berslan-ork literally means "princely nobleman", referring to nobles associated with the princes who acquired their status and privileges through service and patronage. Ork syshaotluh-gussa means "companion of a courageous and noble nobleman", possibly referring to individuals recognized for bravery and dignity. According to the sources, the first three classes were considered to belong to the highest rank, while the ork syshaotluh-gussa were placed in the third degree. Despite these distinctions, all were traditionally referred to as uork.

Modern researchers note that the social structure of traditional Kabardian society differs somewhat from the classification proposed by Shora Nogmov. According to later interpretations, the noble hierarchy included the princes (pshi), tuma (offspring of princes from unequal marriages), tlekotleshi ("strong knee"), dizhenugo ("gilded silver"), beslan-uorki and uork-shaotlugus (vassals of the higher-ranking uorki such as the tlekotleshi and dizhenugo), as well as pshikeu ("princely fence") and beygoli ("servant of the lord"). The precise status of pshikeu and beygoli remains a subject of debate in Adyghe studies. According to some interpretations, pshikeu may have been associated with the beslan-uorki. Nogmov, however, classified pshikeu as the first category of the peasantry. Scholars note that the formation of class hierarchies in human societies is a long and complex process. The idea that social structures were created artificially or instantaneously by a single ruler is generally considered an oversimplification. During the gradual disintegration of tribal relations and the increasing complexity of social organization, governing authorities often lacked sufficient power to impose entirely new structures. By the time rulers began to influence legal norms, the fundamental social hierarchy had already developed. By the reign of Prince Beslan, Kabardian society was already stratified. Although Beslan did not create the class system, his authority allowed him to formalize existing social arrangements and introduce certain modifications to them.

H. M. Dumanov, citing Nogmov, states that the codification of laws in Kabardia began as early as the 15th–16th centuries. As an example, he refers to a legend concerning Beslan, who reportedly established a unified procedure for legal proceedings, introduced laws and rituals, and imposed fines for violations. Sultan Khan-Giray also described the influence of the pshi in lawmaking and their role in adding new provisions to customary law, noting that many legal privileges were appropriated by the princes themselves. He further hypothesized that the pshi influenced not only the development of legal norms but also the identification and formation of different noble groups within society in order to strengthen their authority. Nogmov also provides a detailed description of the judicial institutions of Kabardia. According to his account, Inal the Great appointed forty judges responsible for maintaining order and ensuring the well-being of the population. This system did not survive long after Inal's death, and the judicial institutions he had established gradually declined.

"In the 16th century, during the reign of Prince Berslan Kaitukovich Dzhankutov, the judicial system in Kabarda underwent certain changes. Princes continued to play a leading role in the courts, but the judicial authority of one prince did not stand above that of the others, as it had under Inal. Under Prince Berslan, the competence of the courts was regulated and their functions were more clearly defined, and to a certain extent the court acted as both a legislative and executive body."

According to the account of Shora Nogmov:

"Berslan, in continuing his rule over the Kabardian people and wishing to strengthen their prosperity and provide justice for all, established in every village a kheezja, or arbitration court, where all cases except criminal ones were heard. Complaints and disputes were examined by individuals elected annually by the inhabitants with the approval of the prince. Complaints against judges, criminal cases, and matters concerning the entire people were decided under the chairmanship of the prince in the he, or main court, located at the prince's residence. Berslan also introduced various fines for violations of the laws and rites he had established and attempted to suppress wrongdoing by depriving certain princes of their titles or exiling them. In addition, he introduced a special brand for the horses of himself and the uzden, still known as the Berslan brand. Horses found bearing this mark after theft were subject to severe punishment for the offender."

== Sources ==
- Azikova, Yu. M. (2017). "Beslan Tuchnyy v geroicheskikh pesnyakh i istoricheskikh predaniyakh kabardintsev: obraz vlasti i vlastitelya". Kavkazologiya (PDF) (in Russian). Kabardino-Balkarian State University.
- Nogmov, Shora Bekmurzovich (1861). Istorīi͡a adykheĭskogo naroda (in Russian). Тип. Э. Л. Айбабина.
- Kagazezhev, Zhiraslan V. (2009). Борьба адыгов (черкесов) за национальную государственность: исторический аспект (XIV – первая половина XVI вв.) [The struggle of the Adyghes (Circassians) for national statehood: historical aspect (XIV – first half of the XVI centuries)] (Candidate of Historical Sciences Dissertation) (in Russian). Vladikavkaz: North Ossetian State University.
