= House of Shupako =

Shupako ШIупакIо
- Circassian house of noble origin
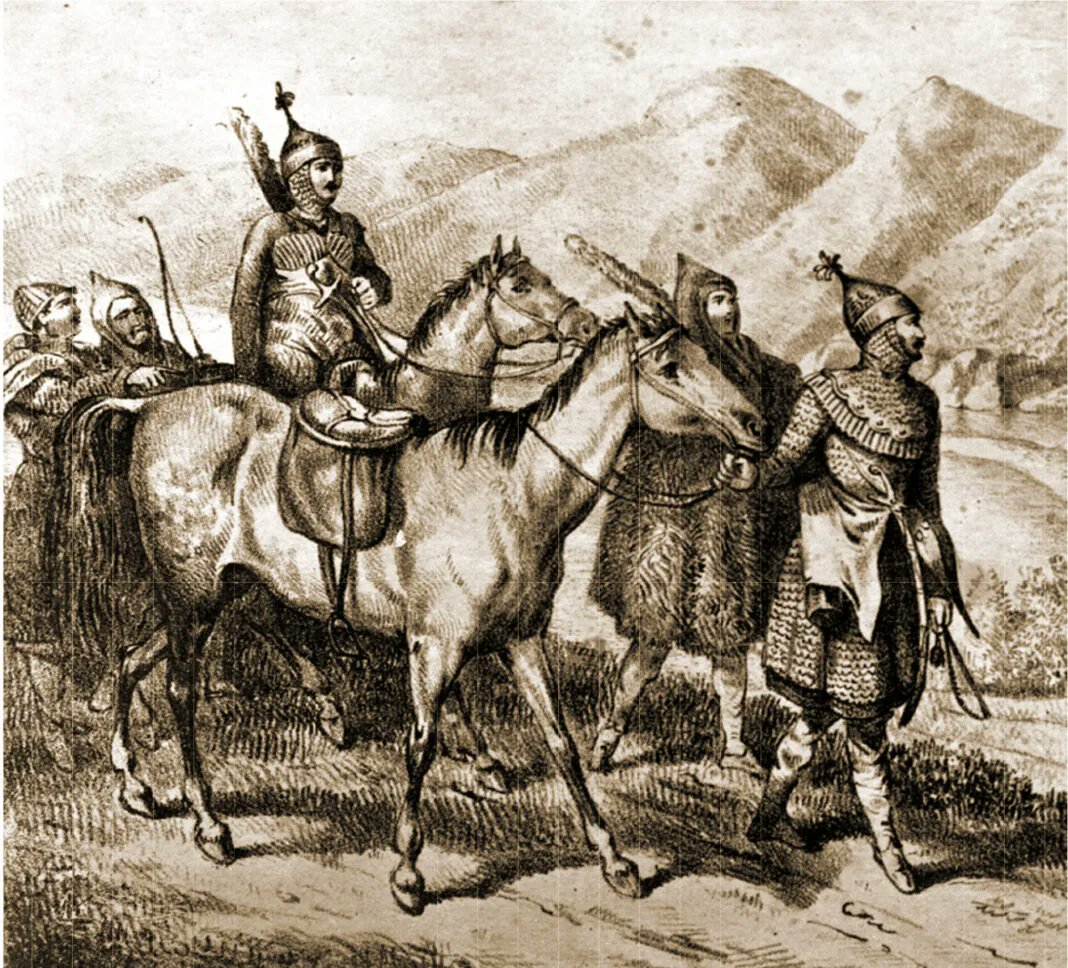
- Members of the House of Shupako
- Country: Circassia (historical); Natukhaj (historical); Russian Empire (historical); Kuban People's Republic (historical); Soviet Union (historical)
- Etymology: S'hu (шIу) and pak'o (пакIо), meaning "the well vanguard" in Circassian
- Founded: Unknown
- Traditions: Khabzeism; Orthodox Christianity; Sunni Islam

The House of Shupako (Adyghe: ШIупакIо, Russian: Шупако) was a highly influential noble family from the Natukhaj tribe of Circassia. The family, which ruled over most of the Natukhaj, raised important military and political leaders during the Russo-Circassian War. It had ties to some of influential Circassian families and played an active role as both a military and political family throughout the war. The Shupako family consisted of a total of 26 (33 according to different sources) sub-branches.

== Name ==
In the book by Edouard Taitbout de Marigny, who visited Circassia, the name appears as Chipakoua or Soupa Koua; in John Longworth’s book, it is written as Chipakow; and in James Bell’s account, it appears as Tshûpako. The word Shupako is derived from the combination of the Circassian words "шIу" and "пакIо". The word "шIу" means "good" or "well", while "пакIо" means "the one who goes ahead".

It has also been used in the forms Tsupako (Цупако), Chupako (Чупако), Shupakua (Шупакуа), Syupako (Сюпако) and Supako (Супако).

== History ==
According to Lhuillier, the Shupako family migrated from the Crimean Peninsula with the Kabardians in the Late Middle Ages and settled among the Natukhaj on the Black Sea coast. The family gained a large sphere of influence when they allied with the Natho's, a powerful dynasty of the Natukhaj. The Shupako's had kinship ties with the Kudenet dynasty in Kabardia and the Berzeg dynasty in Ubykhia. Sultan Khan-Giray, a Circassian ethnographer, described the House of Shupako as "the leading house of the Natukhaj's". Muhammad Yindaruqo Shupako, the owner of Pshad and the head of the Shupako's, belonged to a sub-branch called Kiriakin, which was identified by a tamga resembling the cursive letter 'т' in the Russian alphabet.

=== Construction of the Anapa Fortress ===
In the 1780s, the Ottomans wanted to build a fortress in Anapa, a strategically important location on the Black Sea coast within Natukhaj territory. However, the Natukhaj leaders, viewing this as a threat to their independence, were initially reluctant and hesitant to allow the construction. Later, due to gifts and trade opportunities offered by the Ottoman Empire, they began to cooperate and permitted the fortress to be built. The Ottomans then began construction on the lands of Zaneqo Mehmedcheri Bey, father of Seferbiy Zaneqo, who owned extensive territory in Anapa. However, the House of Shupako and its supporters continued to oppose the construction and tried to stop the construction of the fortress. While the Natukhaj were discussing the issue in the council, Ahmed Shupako said the following:

Turkey is not like us. Turkey is a state, and it can go to war with another state. If, as a result of such a war, the fortress is taken by the victorious state, then all the land on which the fortress stands legally becomes the property of that state.

Gathering some groups of detachments, Ahmed Shupako launched attacks on the fortress under construction. Because he repeatedly caused the destruction of the fortress under construction and halted its progress, he was given the title "Qalebat" by the Circassians, meaning "fortress destroyer." The Qalebatuqo family, a sub-branch of the House of Shupako, were descendants of Ahmed Shupako's family. In 1796, Ahmed Shupako took part in the commoners' army during the Battle of Bziyiqo.

=== Russo-Circassian War ===
In the early 19th century, Qalebatuqo Hatuqay Shupako, the ruler of Gelendzhik, attempted to unite the Circassians with a "national oath" and declared himself the leader of the Circassian Confederation, but recognition of his rule remained limited. Muhammad Yindaruqo's reputation had been damaged due to reasons such as having engaged in trade with the Russians. After him, Hawduqo Mansur was chosen by members of the dynasty as the new leader because of his anti-Russian stance and leadership qualities. Hawduqo Mansur Shupako, the most influential figure of the dynasty, became the leader of the Circassian Confederation and was recognized as one of the most active commanders in the fight against the Russians. The house had many allies and vassals by the first half of the 19th century. The Shupako's resisted the Russian invasion and deployed warriors to various regions of Circassia.

=== End of the Family Line ===
Starting especially from the 1860s, a large part of the Shupako lineage, along with other Natukhajs, was significantly reduced as a result of Russia's systematic extermination campaigns and deportations. According to oral sources, all the male members of the Shupako family were killed during World War II, and the remaining individuals gradually assimilated into other families.

== Notable members ==
- Ahmed Qalebat Shupako
- Hawduqo Mansur Shupago (1770s–1846)
- Muhammad Yindaruqo Shupako (1737–1838)
- Qalebatuqo Hatuqay Shupako (18th c.–?)
- Shamuz Qehriqo Shupako
- Ismail Nawruz Shupako
- Qalebatuqo Kushmat Shupako

== Images ==
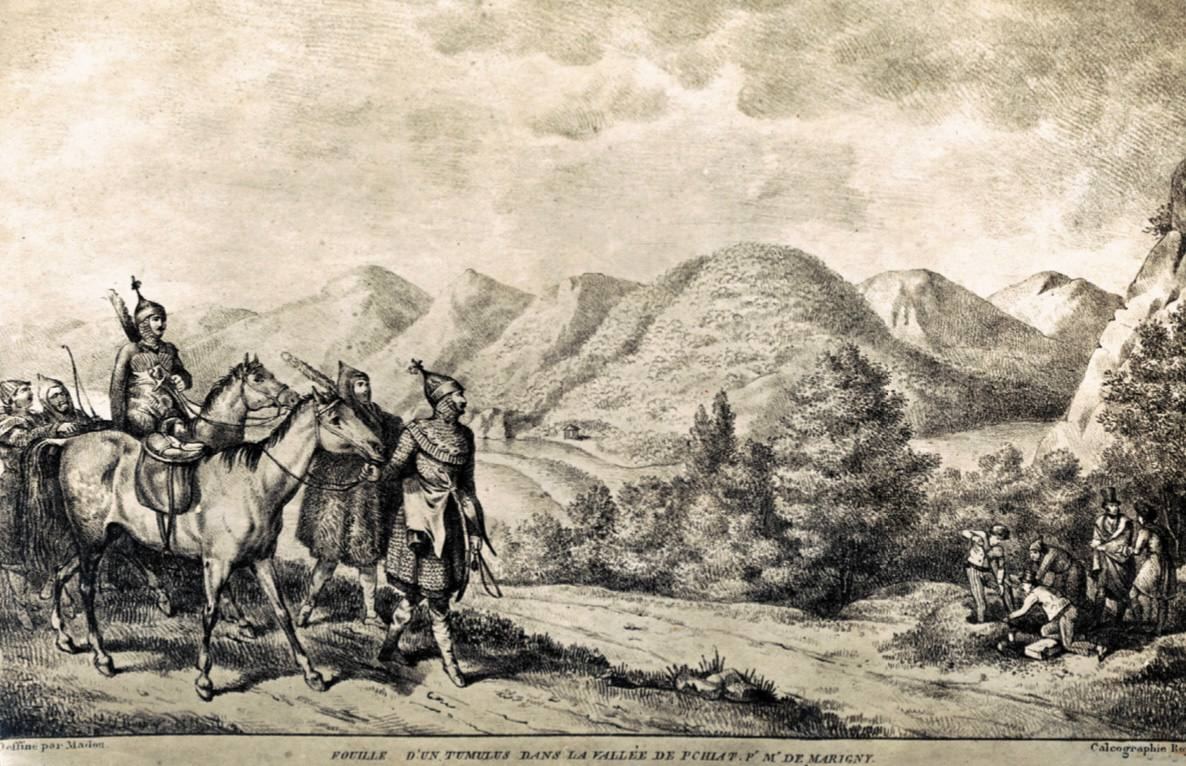
Members of Yindaruqo-Shupako family in the Pshad Valley (1818)

The tamga of Yindaruqo family

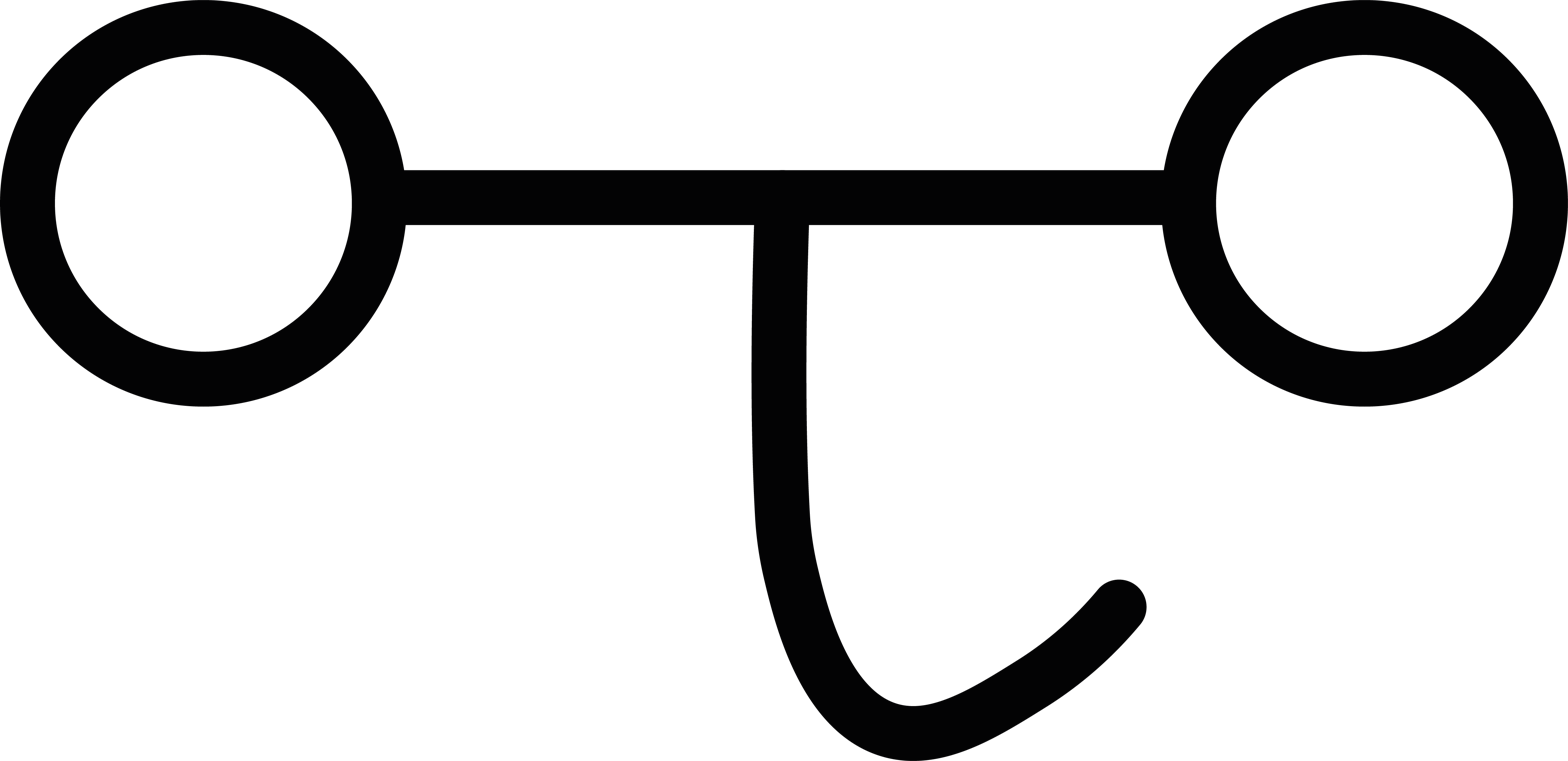
The tamga of Hawduqo family
