= Jankhot I of Kabardia =

Jankhot Tabuldu

Grand Prince of Kabardia
- Reign: c. 1460s
- Predecessor: Inarmas (per A. I. Lobanov-Rostovsky); Minbolet (per AS 3313)
- Successor: Beslan the Fat (per A. I. Lobanov-Rostovsky); Qeban and Yelberdiy (per AS 3313)
- Born: Unknown; Kabardia
- Died: Unknown; Kabardia
- Issue: Disputed, see § Family
Names
- Jankhot, son of Tabuldu
- Kabardian: Тэбылду и къуэ Жанхъуэт
- Father: Tabuldu of Kabardia

Jankhot Tabuldu (Kabardian: Тэбылду Жанхъуэт) was a Circassian princely figure of the early periods of Kabardia. He is recorded in Arabic manuscript material and later genealogical records, which preserve differing accounts of his status and lineage within early Kabardian political history. His position and role are associated with a period of dynastic transition and contested authority among Kabardian ruling houses.

== Biography ==
=== Arabic manuscript account ===
Following the rule of his brother Qirqilish, Jankhot, referred to in the manuscript as Jan Khud (Arabic: خود جان), was technically next in line for power according to a seniority system that distributed inheritance among brothers. However, he was initially bypassed. The council of elders (later associated in tradition with the khasa) instead chose his brother Minbolet as supreme prince, despite Minbolet being described as previously occupying a subordinate position in the polity.

The Arabic manuscript al-‘Uqūd al Jawhariyya fī al Mahāsin al Dawla al Ashrafiyya al Ghawiyya (AS 3313) also states that Jankhot, as a legitimate claimant, attempted to secure power with the assistance of the Tatars of the Great Horde. However, he was unable to maintain his position and was deposed shortly thereafter by the sons of Qirqilish, Qeban (Arabic: قبان) and Yelberdiy (Arabic: يلربدي), who are described as ruling jointly. The same narrative places the departure of Kansukh al-Gauri from Kabardia to Cairo during their rule.

=== Russian genealogical account ===
According to the Genealogy of Kabardian princes and murzas of the 17th century attributed to A. I. Lobanov-Rostovsky, Jankhot is presented as a Supreme Prince of Kabardia, succeeding Inarmas and being succeeded by his son Beslan the Fat.

== Family ==
AS 3313 names two sons of Jan Khud:

- Qeytuqo, referred to in the manuscript as Kituk
- Talostan, referred to in the manuscript as Tau Sultan

Russian genealogies do not mention a son named Qeytuqo but state that Jankhot had two sons:

- Beslan, later Grand Prince of Kabardia
- Talostan, founder of the House of Talostan

== Sources ==
- Druzhinina, Inga A.; Iliushina, Milana Yu; Kabardov, Inal B. (2024-12-23). "NOBILITY AND POWER IN 15TH-CENTURY KABARDA ACCORDING TO THE SOURCE "PRECIOUS NECKLACES CONCERNING MERITS OF THE STATE OF AL-ASHRAF AL-GHAWRI"". History, Archeology and Ethnography of the Caucasus (in Russian). 20 (4). doi:10.32653/CH204772-782. ISSN 2618-849X.
- Druzhinina, I. A. (2024). Chkhaidze, V. N. (ed.). ByzantinoCaucasica. Выпуск 4 Поход шейха Хайдара на Северный Кавказ 1486 г. и два раздела Кабарды [Sheikh Haydar's Campaign to the North Caucasus in 1486 and Two Divisions of Kabarda] (in Russian). Moscow: Institute of Oriental Studies RAS. ISBN 978-5-907845-12-1.
