= Muhammad Yindaruqo =

Muhammad Yindaruqo Shupako
- Мыхьэмэд Индарыкъо ШIупакIо
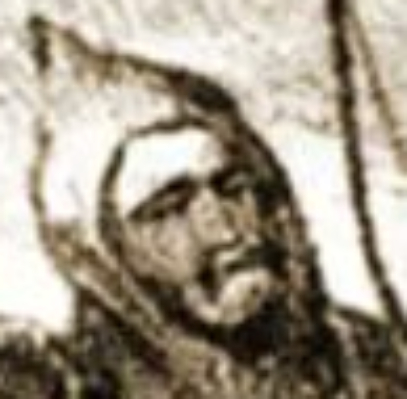

Head of the House of Shupako
- Succeeded by: Hawduqo Mansur

Lord of the Pshada Valley
- Succeeded by: Nogai Yindaruqo

Personal details
- Born: c. 1730s / 1750s Natukhaj, Circassia
- Died: 1838 Natukhaj, Circassia
- Children: Nogai; Islamdjeriy; Kasbolet; Musa; Guasha; Chapsina
- Parent: Yindar(?)
- House: House of Shupago; Kiriakin
- Noble rank: Tlekotlesh

Military service
- Allegiance: Circassian Confederation: Natukhaj
- Battles/wars: Russo-Circassian War

Muhammad Yindaruqo Shupako (Adyghe: Мыхьэмэд Индарыкъо ШIупакIо), was the leader of Pshada, a nobleman of the Natukhai from the Shupako house, and a Circassian leader.

Although him and his family initially maintained good relations with the Russian Empire, they actively resisted the Russians during the later stages of the Russo-Circassian War.

== Biography ==
He was said to have been a brave and resilient warrior in his youth. He was the largest landowner in the Pshada Valley and is known to have vassal nobles under his command. He is considered the owner of the trading warehouses in Pshada and the main protector of commercial activity in the region. He had a small half-pound cannon that he used to greet his guests.

His dwelling was in a fenced settlement of many huts, located in the Pshada Valley, about three leagues inland from the sea, by the river. At the confluence of the Pshada River and its right tributary Doguab, about 12 km, lay a plateau belonging to him and his village.

He is occasionally mentioned in the books of James Bell, John Longworth and Eduard Taitbout de Marigny. He wore a long, blue, foreign-made tunic and was using a staff. During wartime, he wore a coarse wrapper, the type worn by Circassian warriors. J. Bell found Yindaruqo's facial features quite distinctive and was able to recognize the resemblance even from a distance. Unlike other elders, he only grew a mustache. It was an ancient tradition, common among those who adhered to old rituals. Muhammad was approximately 65 when he met with Marigny in 1818. However J. Bell and J. Longworth recorded his age as approximately 100 when they met him in 1837. According to Marigny's description, he was tall, had strong features, was remarkably vigorous for his age, had an upright posture, and possessed a commanding tone of voice.

He helped the crew of the "Circassion" ship, which ran aground in 1819, to reach Russia safely. In a plague disease in 1820 that was brought with Turkish merchants, Muhammad survived the plague by establishing a quarantine at his area.

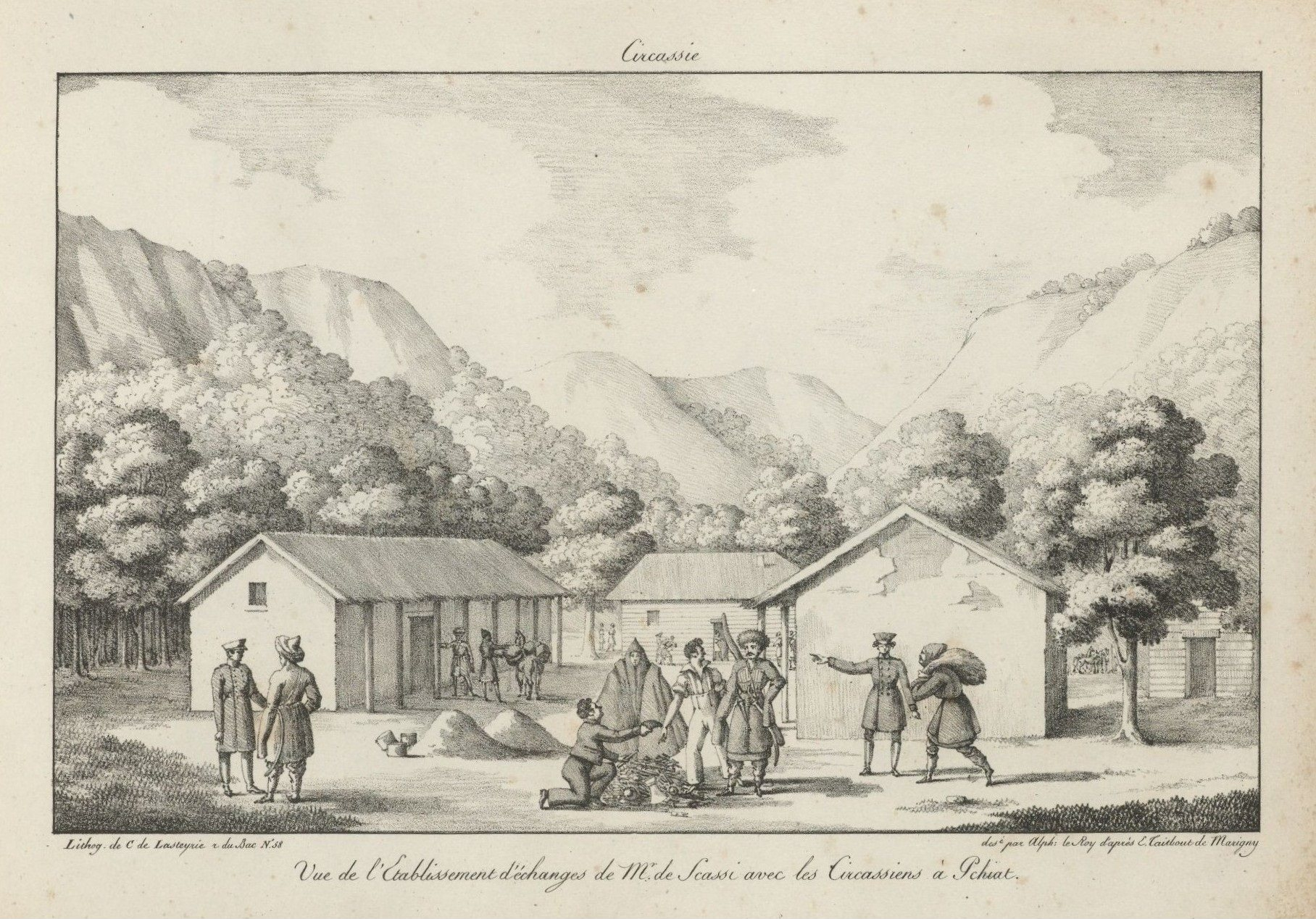
View of Scassi’s trading establishment with the Circassians at Pshada

He advised European merchants to build warehouses on his land to avoid the import taxes demanded by the local population. These warehouses were later burned down by people. He had long held the right to collect taxes from ships entering the port of Pshada, but this privilege was later revoked by the people's assembly claiming that "no one has the right to pay tribute." He was accused of secretly collaborating with the Russians and being their agent, which caused him to fall out of favor with the public for a time despite not swearing allegiance to Russia. In 1828, the Russian diplomat Karl Nesselrode listed him and his children among the Circassian leaders who had the most moderate approach towards Russia. Ethnographer L. Y. Lulye stayed at his house during the five years he spent in Pshada.

Before Marigny left Circassia after his first voyage in 1818, Yindaruqo told him the following:

"Go tell the Russians, who despise us, what you have seen among us. You know what we are. Teach them to know us. Persuade them to put an end to useless wars. Tell them that freedom dwells in our mountains; that death is to us preferable to a foreign yoke; and that commerce alone can give them access to our shores. Let them come in your name; let them provide for our wants. My friendship—all that I possess shall be theirs. As for you, do not forget the projects you have communicated to me; hasten to put them into execution, and believe that you will always find in me a father and a friend."

— Yindaruqo to Taitbout de Marigny

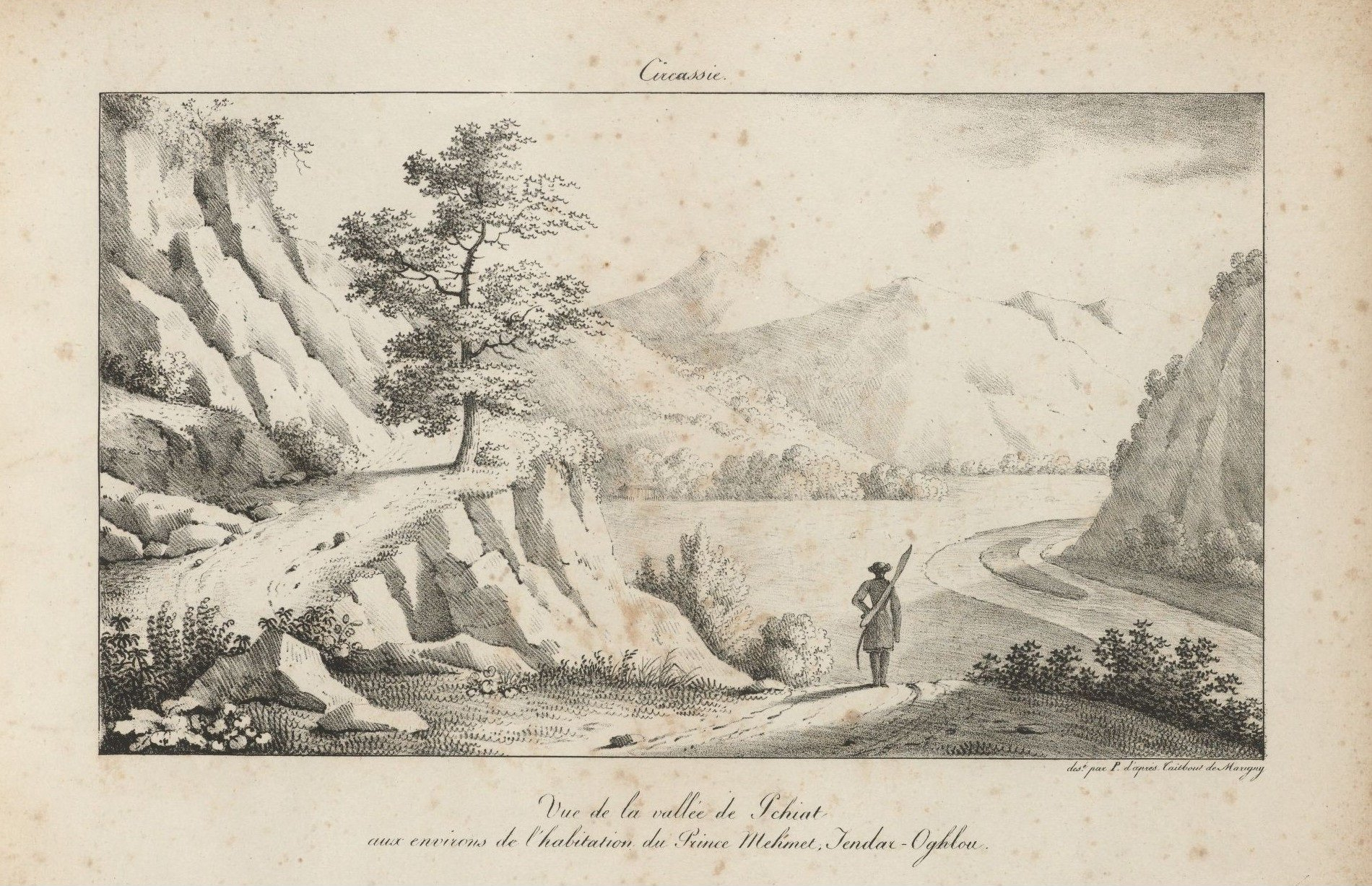
View of the Valley of Pshada near the residence of Muhammad Yindaruqo

According to James Bell, the main reason for this is that he had established business relationships with figures like Marigny and Scassi, who had worked for Russia in the past. Bell countered these accusations by emphasizing his patriotism: he participated in battles against the Russians in the Kuban region, hosted Turkish merchant ships in his port despite Russian prohibitions, and resided in inland areas inaccessible to the Russians.

Because of these suspicions among the public, although people rose to their feet in the National Assembly out of respect for his age, he was treated distantly and excluded during the proceedings. The leadership of Natukhai and the house of Shupako passed from Muhammad to Hawduqo Mansur.

=== Family ===
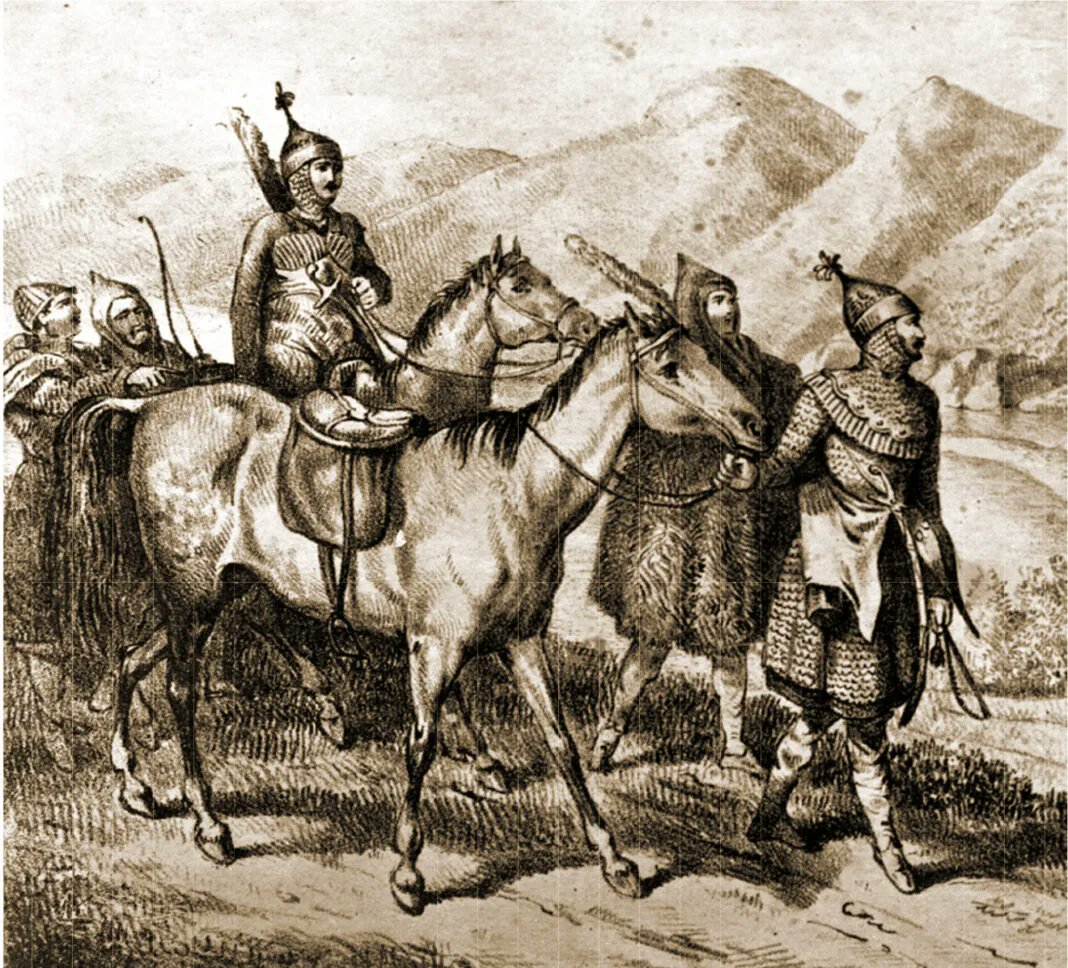
The members of Yindaruqo family in Pshada, by Marigny

Muhammad had 4 sons (from oldest to youngest: Nogai, Islamdjeriy, Kasbolet and Musa) and at 2 daughters (Guasha and Chapsina). Nogai was his eldest song who was approximately 65 in 1837. Mohammad's wife was approximately 50 years old in 1818 and passed away in 1822 or 1823. Famous leader and warrior Shamuz Qehriqo Shupako was Mohammad's cousin. Nauruzeqo Doletdjeriy was Muhammad's nephew. His family was related to Yedizh noble family of Abzakh through marriage.

Muhammad's four sons had joined forces to save the family's "sinking fortune" due to the Russian invasion. Nogai, the eldest son, sought to restore the family's name and maintain its power not only economically but also through military achievements. His reputation as brave warrior against the Russians, and his sharpshooting skills on the battlefield, were part of his effort to regain the family's tarnished social standing through military heroism.

Muhammad's eldest daughter Guasha had married to the famous warrior and nobleman Qerzech "The Wolf" Shirikhuqo. Despite having many noble and wealthy suitors, she eloped with Shirikhuqo one night, and married him without waiting for her family's consent. Guasha had previously been engaged to an Abzakh nobleman when she was abducted by Shirikhuqo.

Muhammad was the leader of the noble house of Shupako which he belonged. He belonged to a sub-branch named Kiriakin, one of the 33 sub-branches of Shupako. "Yindaruqo" means "son of Yindar."

Tamga of Kiriakin sub-branch

He and his family were continuing the rituals of "worship before the cross" an ancient tradition in the region despite being Muslims. On Sundays of certain months, they were going to the cross in the bay with their family and pray.

The tamga of his sub-branch was in the shape of the cursive Russian T. His sword's hilt also bore his tamga.

=== Russo-Circassian War ===
Although he initially ensured the safety of Russian merchant ships and received gifts from the Russian Tsar like a jeweled dagger, he later frequently took part in Circassian campaigns against the Russians. He participated in various campaigns and defensive battles against the Cossacks along with his family.

He categorically rejected General Alexey Veliaminov offers of peace and cooperation, which were conveyed to him through an agent, M. Tausch, who he worked with before.

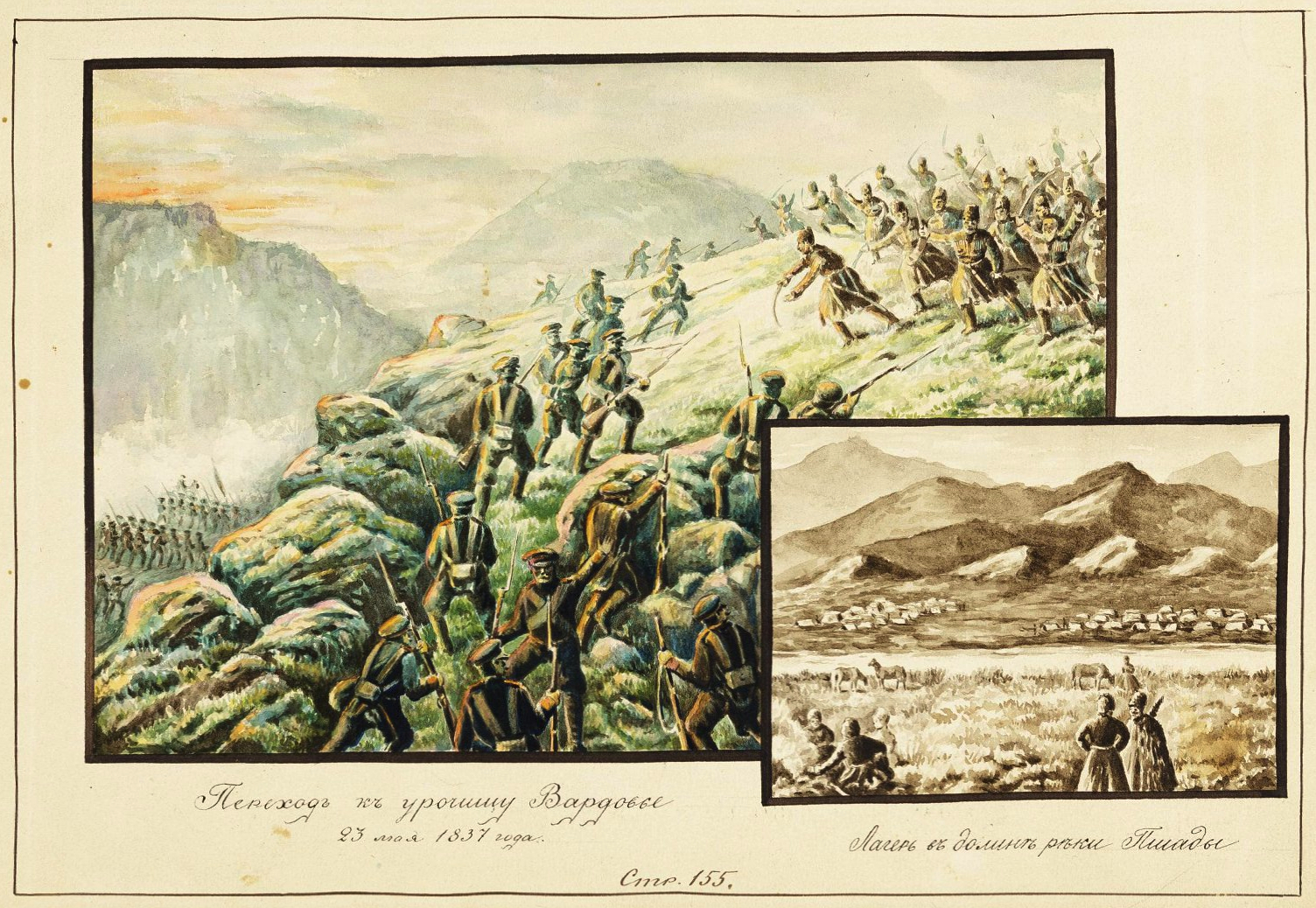
Russian campaign of Pshada, June 1837.

During the Russian campaign of Pshada in June 1837, he refused to Russians offer to join them, and in response to the Russians' offer to protect his home as per the agreement, he personally set his own house on fire and retreated to the mountains with his people. They settled in the upper part of the valley, in the middle of an oak forest on a kind of peninsula where the Tabeh and Sumez streams merge to form the Pshada River. In September 1837, Muhammad talked with local chieftains to secure a safe haven for them near Tsemez. In late 1837, they migrated to near Tsemez (modern-day Novorossiysk). According to Bell's reports from 1838, Nogai and his sons were still staying at Pshada, in mountainous and forested areas outside the Russian fortress range.

He actively participated in battles against the Russians, most notably in Kuban region. In 1836, his son Nogai fought against the Russians at Tsemez. On July 8, 1837, during clashes in Pshada against Veliaminov, Yindaruqo's grandson and two of his vassals were wounded. On December 4, 1837, his grandson Jembulat (son of Nogai) had been killed during the clashes in Pshada. Nogai was present too and most likely, he had participated in the Siege of Lazarevsky.

He had high expectations in Britain's help during the war.

"We are too poor to recompense the English properly for thinking us in our distress; but God will reward them; and every day in my prayers, I pray God to do so. I am now old and very infirm, and my only wish before I die is, that I may see my country free and at peace."

— Yindaruqo to James Bell

=== Death ===
Muhammad Yindaruqo died in 1838.
