= National Oath =

Social movement in 19th century Circassia

National Oath Чылэ Тхьэрыӏо Жылэ Тхьэрыӏуэ
- Leader: Qalebatuqo Hatuqay; Hawduqo Mansur; Ismail Berzeg; Seferbiy Zaneqo
- Governing body: National Oath Assembly
- Founder: Qalebatuqo Hatuqay
- Founded: c. 1807
- Membership: "thousands"
- Ideology: Circassian nationalism
- Religion: Islam

Party flag

National Oath (Adyghe: Чылэ Тхьэрыӏо; Kabardian: Жылэ Тхьэрыӏуэ, lit. 'The People's Oath') was a social and political movement built around a pledge of national unity in early 19th-century Circassia, which was adopted by prominent Circassian figures (such as local rulers, commanders, aristocrats, clergy, and thamate elders) as well as large segments of the common population. Circassians adopting the oath vowed to unify Circassia as a single country and resist the ongoing Russian annexation of Circassia. Leaders from different regions of Circassia swore loyalty to the National Oath and formed a unified political movement and ultimately a loose Circassian government; successor movements inspired by the National Oath lasted until 1864 when the Russian Empire competed its conquest.

== Background ==
=== Origins and development ===
Historically in Circassia, a Sworn brotherhood (Adyghe: ЗэтхьарIогъу, lit. 'Mutual oath-ship') was a voluntary clan where people or families come together by choice. Its main goal was to protect members from outside pressure. These groups would act like small republics. They had their own judges to solve problems between members. In some areas, there were dozens of these brotherhoods made of many different families. The National Oath sought to unite all of Circassia in this manner as a "national" oath. The practice of oath-taking existed in traditional Circassian society to settle disputes, but the National Oath expanded this custom into a political movement. The concept of the oath originated among the Circassians around roughly 1800. James Stanislaus Bell and other British adventurers who visited Circassia in the 1830s stated that the national oath began roughly 30 years ago. According to Circassian oral history, it was established in 1807 by Qalebatuqo Hatuqay; Bell also cites this name as the designer of the oath. Bell reported that prominent Circassian leaders, such as Hawduqo Mansur, viewed the national oath as a mechanism of salvation for the country by establishing a permanent, unifying rule of law.

Individuals who took the oath were required to swear upon the Quran. The sacred book was suspended on rifle-rests, and the individual would step forward, take the Quran in hand, and swear their adherence before the elders, prefacing his sworn declaration by stating, "This is the book of God, and I declare..." The oath was administered broadly to males from the age of fifteen and upwards. Communities or individuals who demurred or refused to take the oath faced severe threats, including having their houses burned down by the authorities or facing armed force. In some regions, such as the southern coast, deputies took the oath on behalf of their respective districts, and a subscription fund was created to reward those who discovered and reported treachery. The individual who took the oath swore to remain perfectly true to Circassia and to hold no communication, trade, or intercourse of any kind with their enemies, the Russians. They were required to actively denounce anyone who communicated with the enemy and to assist in their condemnation and punishment. They were also bound to inform against anyone who commit crimes such as theft or murder and help bring them to justice. While past crimes confessed during the oath were handled with fines, breaking the oath after taking it was treated with the utmost severity: if it was proven that a person violated their sworn engagements for any reason, they forfeited their life. Bell reports one case of confession:

An individual who had taken the oath was called upon to declare, like the rest, what crimes he had of late been guilty of. He replied, he had none to make confession of, and was allowed to depart. Next morning, however, he made his appearance, bearing as a peace-offering to the judge five or six measures of grain and a large basket of honeycomb, and stated that the devil (some good angel I rather think) had terrified him all night for the falsehood he had told, in concealing his crimes, of which he then made a frank confession.

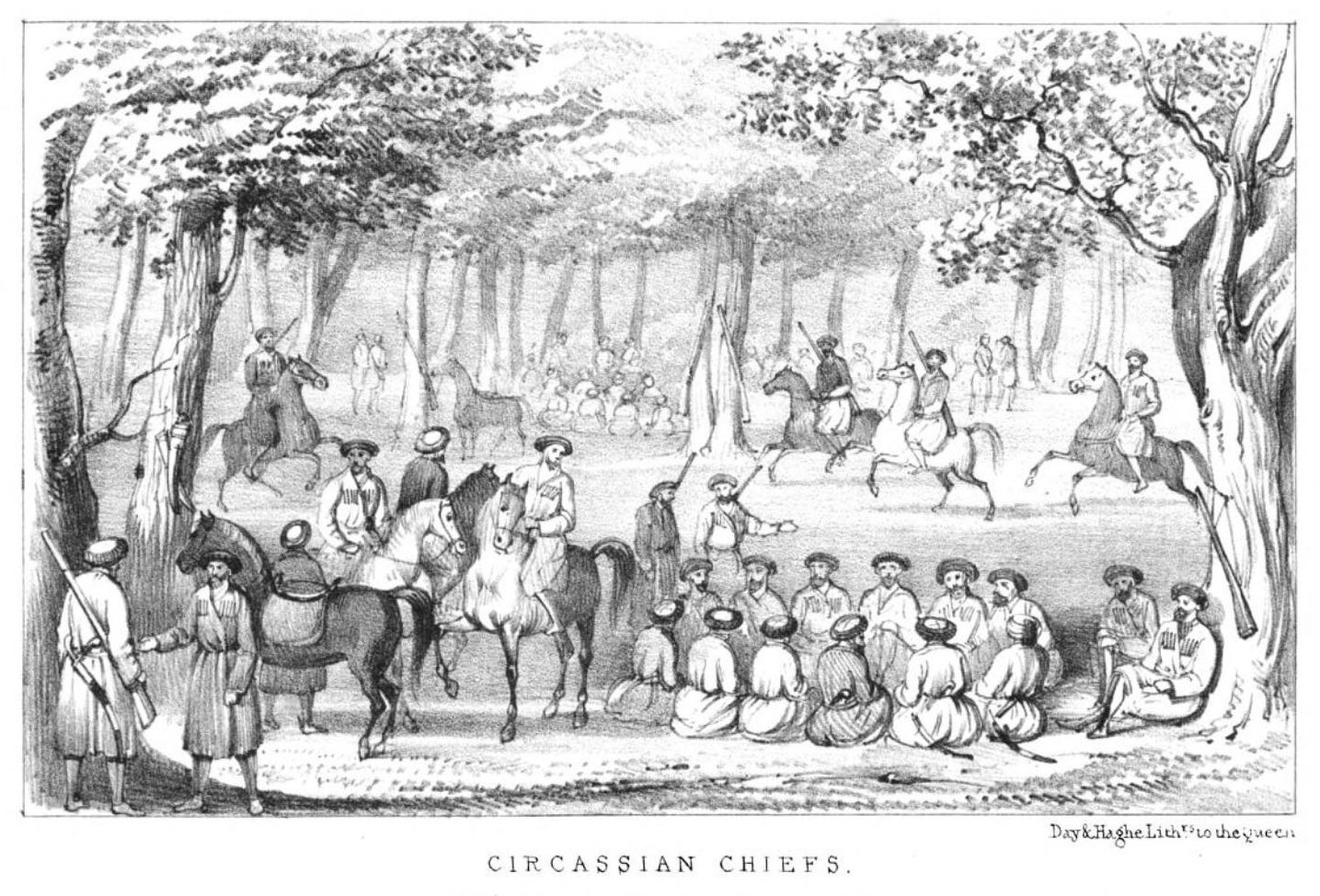
Circassian Chiefs, drawn by Longworth

Oath Assemblies or tarko-khass (Adyghe: Тхьэрыӏо Хасэ) were established in each locality to serve as local government and enforce the oath. It was a select group of thamates (seniors or elders) chosen from each sworn brotherhood based on their expertise. Once selected by their peers, these elders took an oath to administer justice according to their conscience, without showing favoritism to any person and without accepting bribes to pervert their rulings. After evidence was publicly presented and debated in a trial, the Oath Assembly withdrew to deliberate privately. Once they reached a consensus, they returned and communicated their final judgment through a chosen president. Their authority also extended to civil matters, such as debt collection. If a debtor stubbornly refused to pay after the necessary oaths have been taken, a creditor could appeal to the Oath Assembly of both parties' fraternities to obtain the authority and physical assistance needed to seize the debtor's property.

=== Spread of the Oath ===
==== Early spread: 1807-1839 ====
The oath was started sometime around 1807 by Qalebatuqo Hatuqay; but did not instantly gain widespread acceptance in Circassia. In 1831, Seferbiy Zaneqo led a group of Circassians to take the oath. The administration of an early form of the national oath continued in August 1834 under the direction of Natukhaj leaders such as Hawduqo Mansur, and was renewed and expanded in 1837 and 1838. Russian military documents from 1835 identify Seferbiy Zaneqo as the primary organizer responsible for spreading the oath among the population. The oath was enforced from house to house, sometimes involving bloodshed. Bell noted that those who had not taken the national oath were considered enemies by the participants of the movement. To further this movement, leading figures of the movement like Seferbiy Zaneqo traveled through the provinces. By 1838, the movement had resulted in thousands of individuals swearing the oath. The movement spread through several provinces, including but not limited to, Shapsug, Natukhaj, and Abzakh.

Assemblies for the administration of the national oath in the Shapsug region were sometimes conducted during large public gatherings, such as funeral repasts. The national oath acted as a political tool to resolve internal disputes. In 1837, an oath-administering congress in the Shapsug region used the oath to reintegrate noble families that had been expelled to settle past conflicts and prevent these groups from helping Russian forces.

The Treaty of Adrianople was signed on 14 September 1829, which stated that the Ottoman Empire ceded Circassia to Russia. In 1837, the National Oath Assembly convened and rejected the Treaty of Adrianople as invalid, arguing that Circassia had never been a part of the Ottoman Empire. In 1838, the National Oath Assembly released a statement to the nations of the world:

Hundreds of thousands of Russian soldiers who are fighting us and blockading our homeland today will also fight you tomorrow. Our mountains act as the fortress and gateway for Turkey and Iran; if we are destroyed, these countries will be left defenseless. It is a known fact that we fight against Russia for a sacred cause and have inflicted defeats upon them. Despite this, our homeland is depicted on maps as if it were a part of Russia. Russia tells Western countries that the Adyghes are its own subjects, or that the Adyghes are looting savages who cannot be brought to reason with kindness and cannot be governed by laws. We strongly protest these treacherous lies of the Russians! There are thousands of Russian refugees among us. They prefer our barbarism to the civilization of their own countries.

In 1839, when the magistrates established permanent courts in Ubykh districts to enforce the National Oath, in Adler and Ghesh, forty judges took a religious oath to administer justice and required suspected collaborators to swear the National Oath to sever all trade and communication with Russian forces. Russian authorities viewed the National Oath as a threat and issued a decree offering 2.000 silver roubles for the assassination of the leader of the Ubykh region and a key figure of the movement, Ismail Berzeg.

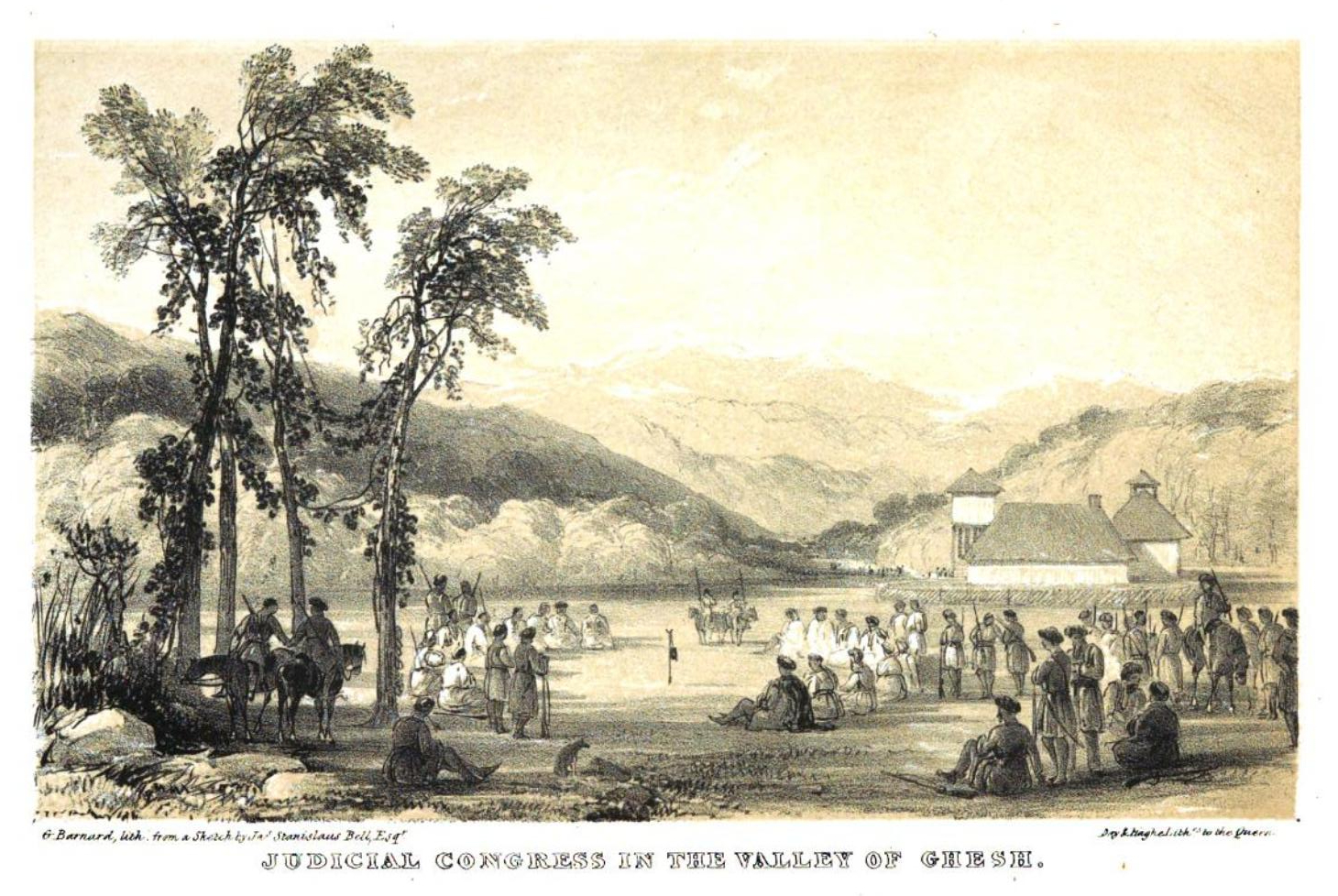
Judicial Congress in the Valley of Ghesh, drawn by Bell

==== The 1839 Assembly ====
In 1839, the National Oath Assembly (Adyghe: Чылэ Тхьэрыӏо Хасэ) convened in the Shapsug region to establish the principles of the National Oath. The assembly agreed on seven main rules for the population of Circassia:

1. Circassia is a single homeland, and the people living there are a united nation.
2. Russians are the national and eternal enemy of Circassia.
3. Citizens of Circassia will not have personal or commercial relations with Russians.
4. Every citizen will fight against Russia with their life and property until the end.
5. Individuals who betray the oath will receive penalties up to death.
6. Citizens must avoid theft and bad behavior; anyone observing these actions must report them to help penalize the offenders.
7. Individuals who commit crimes involuntarily must confess their actions.

The rules of the oath required strict adherence from the population. Violators of the oath would pay with their lives. Large portions of the Circassian population considered themselves bound by these obligations, leading to continued resistance until 1864. If an individual communicated with the Russians for purposes other than purchasing salt, they faced a fine of twenty-four oxen. If a person had previously taken the national oath and was proven to have broken it, they forfeited their life. The individual's sworn brotherhood had the option to redeem this death sentence by paying a penalty of two hundred oxen. Mosque sermons were used to prepare the population for the administration of the oath, explaining its obligations and the necessity of punishing violators.

Later in 1839, the Abzakh region brought a Russian peace offer to the assembly for discussion. The National Oath Assembly convened in the Abzakh region to discuss the terms and concluded that peace with Russia would only be possible under the condition that the entire North Caucasus was evacuated by Russian forces.

The principles of the National Oath were published in the Declaration of Circassian Independence, a document addressed to the monarchs of Europe and Asia. Following the meetings, a delegation traveled to Constantinople to communicate their political position to international actors. The Circassian flag served as the symbol of the oath. The National Oath functioned as a social contract that replaced feudal allegiances with a collective legal authority acting as a metaphorical monarch. It started internal reforms that restricted the privileges of the nobility to create a more egalitarian structure between social classes, thus aimed to end internal conflicts and synchronize resistance. By seeking international witnesses to the oath (such as Bell and Longworth), the Circassians attempted to demonstrate to external states that their society operated under a formal legal system. The movement established a contractual political union focused on property security and national sovereignty.

==== The Defter act of 1841 ====
A "defter" (Adyghe: Дэфтэр) in Circassia was an act document in which Khabze rulings were written, it was recorded by an effendi (Islamic scholar). The attendees then validated the document by affixing their seals (Adyghe: мыхъур) or ink-stained fingers to it, giving the text binding legal force, thus making it a part of Adyghe Khabze. The process of enacting a defter was highly formalized. After a popular assembly reached a decision, the people would swear an oath on the Quran to uphold it. These documents functioned as formal laws, binding contracts, or societal conditions that guided legal and social life in Circassia during the Late Middle Ages and Modern Times.

In 1841, the Ubykh, Natukhaj, Shapsug, Abzakh, and several Abkhaz-Abazin tribes convened the assembly in Pshekha and wrote down the principles of the National Oath in a written a document called the Defter of 1841. The Defter of 1841 formalized a military union encompassing all democratic Circassians from the Natukhaj territory down to the Abkhazian border. The treaty was also kept open for the lowland principalities to join. A portion of the text of the 1841 defter was as follows:

Praise be to God, who created us and showed us His greatness, elevating us above other animals. Praise be to God, who gave us all the means to live happily in this world and receive a reward in the next, who showed us the true path of salvation, His true faith, through His prophet and messenger Muhammad. Praise be to God, who is our protector and savior on the Day of Resurrection. We wish to remedy all the disorders of our land and do no evil to one another.

1. Our primary obligation shall be the strict observance of Sharia law. All alternative doctrines are hereby renounced and strictly prohibited; all criminal offenses shall be adjudicated exclusively in accordance with The Book (Quran).
2. Fraternization with the infidel Russians is expressly forbidden. No individual shall cross into their territory, maintain amicable relations with them, or entertain any overtures of peace. Furthermore, all commerce within their fortifications, erected upon our land, is strictly prohibited. Any person found in violation of this shall be subject to a fine of 30 tumans (300 silver rubles). Necessary provisions must be procured exclusively at the designated border boundaries.
3. No one shall dare to warn the Russians whenever our troops gather for a campaign. Any individual found guilty of informing the enemy shall be liable for penalties: a freeman shall forfeit 200 cows; a peasant shall forfeit 100 cows; and both shall incur a supplementary fine of 30 tumans. Defectors who enter the service of the Russians are hereby declared enemies of the country; consequently, neither they nor their kin shall be entitled to mercy, clemency, or protection.
4. The person of an abrek or immigrant seeking refuge upon our lands is granted sanctuary. Any individual who deprives them of their property by means of force, coercion, or deceit shall be subject to the fine established for the crime of theft.
5. Should a fellow Muslim people enter our territory to ally with the Circassian cause against the common adversary, we pledge them safe harbor and amicable treatment. If necessary, to dispel any mutual distrust, we commit to offering our children as pledges.
6. The sanctity of the interior dwelling is absolute. Any individual found guilty of committing theft within another person's home shall, in addition to the standard fine of 30 tumans, incur a punitive surcharge of 7 tumans. However, should a Russian fugitive commit such a theft, the penalty shall be restitution equal to triple the value of the stolen goods, without the imposition of an additional fine.
7. In the event of an incursion by Russian forces into our territory, every individual is bound by duty to take up arms and deploy to areas of danger. Those who have no weapons are not exempt from martial duty.

...

Following the adoption of the Defter, the Ubykh, Natukhaj, Shapsug, Abzakh, Abkhaz-Abazin groups and other Circassian tribes entered political union with each other. Other Circassian regions were invited to join as well. To apply the rules of the defter, the Abzakh established supreme courts (mahkeme) led by a naib and staffed by judges chosen from the elders.
