= Yidar of Kabardia =

Circassian ruler

Prince Yidar

Supreme Prince of Kabardia
- Reign: 1537 / 1538
- Predecessor: Beslan the Fat
- Successor: Qeytuqo Beslan
- Born: Unknown; Principality of Bzhedug
- Died: 1537 / 1538; Kabardia
- Issue: Prince Bita; Prince Temruqo; Prince Kanbulat; Prince Zhelegot
- Dynasty: House of Inal
- Father: Prince Inarmas

Yidar Yinarmas (Circassian: Айдар) was a Circassian ruler of the Caucasus. He was the son of Prince Yinarmas, and the grandson of Prince Tabuldu. Prince Inarmas himself was the eldest of the three grandsons of Prince Inal.

== Reign ==
Prince Inal had established a strong empire in the fifteenth century uniting all Circassians, and Abkhazians. However, after his death Kabarda was riven into rival principalities. Civil war ensued and Prince Yidar emerged as the sole potentiate. During his reign, just like his predecessor, the Kabardian Circassians dominated the North Caucasus in the late fifteenth century and early sixteenth century. They established diplomatic contacts with the Ottoman Empire, and the Russians.

According to Shora Nogmov, Yidar was the grandson of Prince Inal through Kirmish, the son of Inal's third wife. Zh. V. Kazegezhev, however, considers Yidar to have been a great-grandson of Inal, arguing that an additional generation—Tabula (Tobulda)—should be placed between Kirmish and Inal. Tabula is mentioned in earlier genealogies compiled by A. I. Lobanov-Rostovsky in 1664 and by A. M. Pushkin in 1768.

The family of Yidar traced its descent from Inarmas, the eldest son of Tabula-murza. According to Nogmov, Yidar was raised in the household of his maternal grandfather, the Bzhedug prince Elzher Khamish. As an adult, having already established a reputation as a capable military and political leader, Yidar intervened in the internecine struggles among the Kabardian princes. In the course of this conflict, Yidar assembled a large coalition army from several Western Circassian tribes, thereby strengthening his political legitimacy beyond simple dynastic claims. This coalition included the Bzhedugs, Zhaney, (Note: Although Nogmov refers to them as Shapsug, it is generally considered that they were the Zhaney tribe, which represented their historical equivalent at the time.) Kheghach (Khegayk), and Makhosh.

Although Yidar's coalition emerged victorious in the ensuing battle, it failed to achieve a decisive result. The exhausted Kabardian side subsequently proposed a peace agreement, which Yidar accepted. Under the terms of this settlement, Yidar was recognized as the Grand Prince of Kabardia. He obtained the right to settle wherever he wished within Kabardian territory, and the region under his authority, particularly the basin of the Cherek River, became known as "Yidarey". The Kabardian princes acknowledged his authority and agreed that any rebellion against his rule would be punishable by death. Yidar died not long after these events and was succeeded by Qeytuqo, the son of Beslan.

== Family ==
He had four sons, Prince Bita, Prince Temruqo, Prince Kanbulat and Prince Zhelegot.

== See also ==
- Kabardians
