= Inal the Great =

Legendary Circassian king

Inal the Blind
- King of Circassia; Prince of Princes
- The crown attributed to Inal

Grand Prince of All Circassia
- Reign: See § Dating of Inal
- Predecessor: Office established
- Successor: Various princes self-proclaim themselves
- Born: Taman, Zichia
- Died: Grand Principality of Circassia
- Burial: Unknown, allegedly Inal-Quba, Abkhazia or the Ispravnaya region, Karachay-Cherkessia
- Spouse: Two wives, an unnamed Abkhaz Anchabadze princess & an unnamed Circassian noblewoman
- Issue: Тэбылду (Tabuldu); Беслъэн (Beslan); КIэмрыгу/Темырыгу (Chemrug/Temrug); Зан/Жанэ (Note: In different narratives, he is referred to as his grandson.) (Zan/Zhané)
Names
- Full name: Абдун-хан икъуэ Къэс икъуэ Аду-хан икъуэ Хъурыфэлъей икъуэ Инал Нэху (Abdun-xan yiqwə Qəs yiqwə Adu-xan yiqwə Xhurıfətley yiqwə Yinal Nəxw)
- Dynasty: Inalid
- Father: Хъурыфэлъей (Khurfatley)
- Religion: Eastern Orthodoxy (or Chalcedonian Christianity) syncretised with Khabzeism

Inal Nef (Adyghe: Инал Нэшъу; Kabardian: Инал Нэху, lit. 'Inal the Blind') was the folkloric Supreme Prince (King) of Circassia who unified all Circassians into one state. (Note: The exact years of Inal's reign are unknown and the suggested years have not been confirmed.) He led campaigns into several areas and expanded borders on all directions. Inal's descendants are narrated to have been the founders of princely dynasties within Circassian groups, mainly Kabardia, Besleney, Chemguy, Zhane, and Hatuqay.

== Name ==
The name Inal is of Turkish origin; among Turks, it was given to people whose mother was noble and father was common. "Inal" is pronounced as "Yinal" in Circassian languages; if a word begins with the letter "i", it is pronounced with a "yi" sound.

Inal's title in Circassian was пщым я пщыж meaning "prince of princes." (Note: (Adyghe: Пщыхэм япщ; Kabardian: Пщым я пщыж)) Inal's nickname was "blind" referring to his one-eyed condition. Inal also had another nickname: "Akabgu." According to one theory, this nickname is of Turkic origin, derived from ak-yabgu, meaning "western ruler," and was possibly given to him by the Turks. Another theory suggests that Akabgu is actually a Circassian nickname. In Kabardian, акӏэ means "topknot" (a hair tuft left on the shaved head), and бгъуэ means "wide"; together, акIэбгъуэ refers to a "wide topknot." (Note: This nickname was recorded in Russian sources which was transmitted by Kabardian princes in the 17th century.)

Although some accounts list Inal's nicknames as Kess and Khurfatley, the widely accepted view is that these terms do not refer to nicknames but to Inal's ancestors. Khurfatley (Хъурыфэлъей) is a Kabardian word, as most of the information about Inal was recorded by the Kabardians. It means 'sheepskin leggings'. The word derives from хъурыфэ (sheepskin) and лъей (leggings). In the Western dialects, the sound f shifts to sh, resulting in the form Khurshotley (Хъурышъолъей).

== Folkloric biography of Inal ==
According to some narratives, it is said that Inal initially owned land in the Taman Peninsula. While Circassian lordships fell into Inal's hands one by one, he fought and defeated warlords and clan chieftains. Despite the many attempts to divide and weaken his army, he used political intrigue to ward off any assassinations and divisions in his military. Inal's rise disturbed established Circassian lords, and a confederation of 30 Circassian clans opposing Inal formed an alliance to fight him. In a battle near the Mzymta River, the coalition of thirty Circassian lords was defeated by Inal and his supporters. Ten of them were executed, while the remaining twenty lords declared allegiance and joined the forces of Inal's new state. Afterwards, a prince named Wozdemir rebelled and gathered a large force, with which he defeated the Khegayk. Upon learning that Inal had raised an army and was marching against them, they withdrew to Abkhazia. Inal pursued them into Abkhazia, and in the ensuing battle Wozdemir was killed.

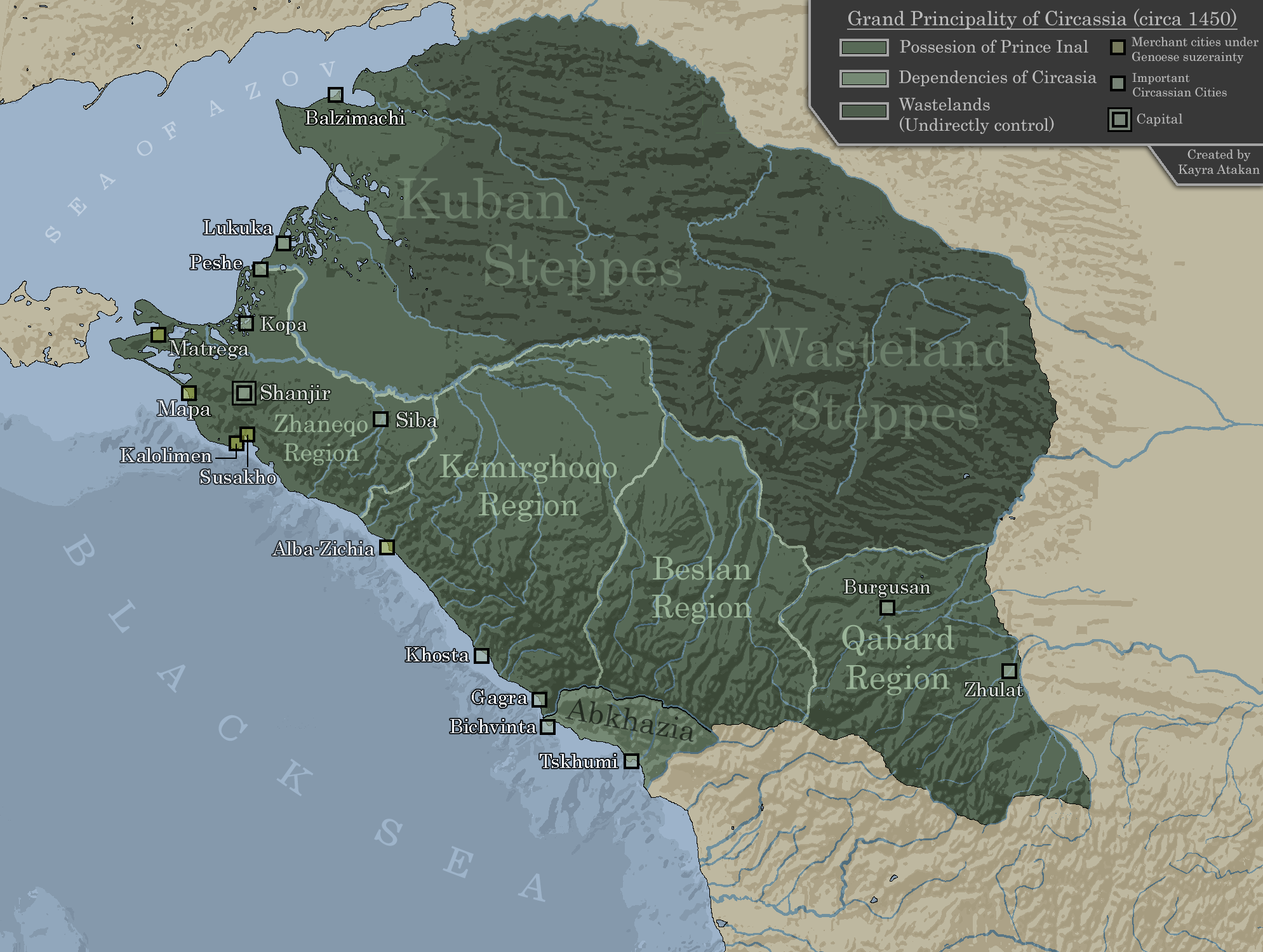
Circassia during the reign of Inal, according to legend

Inal emerged by taking advantage of the power vacuum created during the disintegration of the Golden Horde. Inal, who then ruled Western Circassia, organized a campaign to Eastern Circassia. After the downfall of the Alans following the Timurlane invasion, the powerful Genoese lords and Tatar nomads were ruling the central Caucasian plains. In the mountainous regions to the east lived the Vainakh, while the Ossetians inhabited the Terek basin. Since the early Middle Ages, Circassian communities have also been present in the central Caucasus. Inal captured the Genoese fortresses with sieges and assaults in the upper reaches of the Kuban River (except for the strongest one, Khumar). (Note: Although the fortress was damaged and its settlement mostly destroyed during Timurlane's invasion, its location and strong material made it strategically difficult to capture. The fortress controlled the passage routes of the Kuban, Mary, and Tabard rivers leading into Transcaucasia.) The Khumar fortress could only be accessed from the east, through a place known as the "Inal Valley." It is presumed that Inal's headquarters were established in this area during the siege against the fortress. His initial assaults were unsuccessful, but after a prolonged siege, the battle-weary Genoese surrendered the fortress on the condition of guaranteed safe passage out of Circassia. The control of Khumar by Inal subsequently enabled further campaigns beyond the Kuban.

According to some Kabardian legends, Inal's commander and vassal Prince Kabard Tambiy, led an expedition beyond the Kuban River and founded a settlement near the Malka River, thus establishing the province of Kabardia, (Note: They became the successors of the Circassian community that had been present in the Central Caucasus since the Early Middle Ages.) which was named after him. (Note: The etymology of "Kabar" and "Kabardey" dates back to earlier periods. In the name "Kabard," the letter -d functions as the Abkhaz suffix -du, which means "great." Based on this, it can be inferred that after Tambiy established control over central Caucasus, the term Kabardey was used to denote the territory or domain of "Great Kabar," with the suffix -ey indicating possession or belonging.) According to a different account, instead of the Kabard Tambiy legend, Kabard was the name of a son of Inal. Kabard Tambiy then surrounded the settlement with a fortress and built a watchtower. This fortress served as a base for further expansions. According to Kagazhev, the 1412 campaign of Grand Duke Vytautas the Great of Lithuania against the Pyatigorsk Circassians in Central Caucasia might be associated with this period. Kabard Tambiy was later demoted to noble rank. Thus, the Tambiy clan became first-degree noble among the Kabardians. The dominance of the Circassians into Central Caucasia conflicted with the Tatar rule. By the second quarter of the 15th century, Tatar nomads had been pushed northward from Central Caucasia by Inal. The Circassians gradually migrated to Kabardia from the west. At first, they concentrated around the westernmost which was the Kuban River, eventually spreading eastward to the Terek basin.

Afterwards, Inal organized a new campaign to the north and drove out the Tatar nomads near the Circassian settlements north of the Kuban River along the Don River and expanded his borders to modern-day Azov. According to the account of J. Barbaro in 1438, during a campaign by the Tatar khans against Khan Ulumahmet, the Tatar army bypassed the Circassian territory. This might suggest that by this time, the Circassians had already secured the region. John III describes that at the turn of the 14th and 15th centuries, Circassia expanded its borders to the north to the mouth of the Don, and he notes that "the city and port of Tana is located in the same country in Upper Circassia, on the Don River, which separates Europe from Asia." His description matches Inal's expansions.

After unifying Circassia, Inal turned his attention to Abkhazia, where the Abkhaz clans Anchabadze and Sharvashidze pledged allegiance to him. The Abkhaz people recognized Inal's rule, and he consolidated his authority in the region. Inal married twice. His first marriage was to a Circassian princess, and his second to an Abkhaz princess from the Anchabadze clan. This second marriage can be interpreted as a move to strengthen political ties with the Abkhaz. From his first marriage, he had a son named Chemrug, and from his second, he had two sons: Tabuldu and then Beslan. There are two accounts about Zan. One says he was Chemrug's middle child, while the other says he was Chemrug's brother, from Inal's marriage to the Circassian princess. His sons were trained by the noblemen.

When his conquests subsided, Inal began to take measures to develop the Circassian nation by introducing reforms, organizing tribes and instituting courts of elders to govern the concerns of the Circassian provinces. He introduced the institution of 40 judges.

The capital of this new Circassian state became the city of Shanjir also known as Jansher, founded in the Taman Peninsula region where Inal was born and raised. According to the legends, Shanjir was founded by Inal's ancestor Abdun-Khan. Peter Simon Pallas and Julius von Klaproth were the first researchers to draw attention to the city of Shanjir in history, they both described the city of Shanjir similarly. According to them, Shanjir was very "cleverly designed", had the shape of a rectangle surrounded by walls and moats, and had four gates, thus reminiscent of Roman strategic architecture. In the north, fake hills were built to gain an advantage over the enemy. Klaproth visited the ruins of the city of Shanjir, met the Circassian elders and gathered detailed information about the city. According to the information he learned, Shanjir was in an area close to Anapa.

Between Psif and Nefil there is a quadrilateral with four exits, lined with ramparts and moats, reminiscent of a Roman camp. Remains of the walls and ditches are still visible and stretches eastward about half a German mile (3 km) in diameter. According to what I heard, this place was formerly the residence of the king and was called Shanjir. Circassians express that their ancestors lived here.

— Julius von Klaproth

Although the city's exact location is unknown, the general opinion is that the Krasnaya Batareya region fits the descriptions by Klarapoth and Pallas.

The circumstances and years of Inal's death are unknown. According to the Abkhaz claim and Nogmov, Inal died in Northern Abkhazia. This place is known today as Inal-Quba and is located in the Pskhu region. Although most sources used to accept this theory, recent researches and excavations in the region show that Inal's tomb is not here. According to Russian explorer and archaeologist Evgeniy Dimitrievich Felitsin, Inal's tomb is not in Abkhazia. In a map published in 1882, Felitsin attached great importance to Inal but placed his grave in the Ispravnaya region in Karachay-Cherkessia, not Abkhazia. He added that this area has ancient sculptures, mounds, tombs, churches, castles and ramparts, which would be an ideal tomb for someone like Inal.

Many separate legends have been recorded about the sons of Inal. According to the most accepted view, that after the death of Inal, his sons divided his lands in this way: Tabuldu and his brother Beslan, who were Inal's sons from the Abkhaz princess, settled in Kabardia, the eastern region; Chemrug took the main area between the Kuban River and the Black Sea as Inal's eldest son, where he founded the Principality of Chemguy and assumed Inal's title, "Prince of Princes"; meanwhile, Inal's other relatives remained in the Khegayk tribe in Taman. According to one account, when Inal grew old, he divided his lands among his four sons; Temruk, Beslan, Kabard, and Zanoqo, then stayed in the region governed by Temruk. Although the administration was in the hands of his sons, the highest power still rested with him. Temruk, nicknamed the iron-heart rebelled against Inal, seized his authority, and declared himself the Prince of Princes. Inal's other sons did not accept Temruk's rule. On his deathbed, Inal instructed his sons that Temruk should be recognized as the Prince of Princes.

According to Nogmov, Chemguy principality split, first when Zan and then Hatuqo separated from their older brother Boletuqo, founding the Zhaney and Hatuqay principalities. These brothers were the sons of Chemrug/Temruk. Non-Inalid Bzhedug princes began living on lands taken from the Chemguys. A Bzhedug prince Bagharsiqu founded the Makhosh Principality with his people in the east of Chemguys. In the late 16th century, the Abzakh and Shapsug-Natukhaj tribes appeared, in that order, in central West Circassia and along the Black Sea coast. Thus, the Chemguy Principality, closest to being Inal's successor, retreated between the Kuban and Laba rivers. In the first half of the 16th century, Beslan's son Qanoqo migrated west with one-sixth of the Kabardian people and founded the Besleney Principality. According to a genealogy record by Lobanovskaya, Beslan argued with Tabuldu and left Kabardia, establishing the Besleney, not Qanoqo.

== Dating of Inal ==
Sultan Khan-Giray dates Inal's reign to the 7th century based primarily on inferences drawn from oral accounts. According to these oral traditions, the Kabardians' ancestors lived in the city of Shanjir during Inal's lifetime, had adopted Christianity, and had settled around present-day Pyatigorsk approximately 1100 years before the 19th century. These oral sources also suggest that Christianity was present among the lower-class Circassians at that time.

Klaproth dates Inal's time to the 14th century, or possibly even the 13th century. Lyulye dates Inal's reign to the early 15th century. According to Kabardian historian Evgeniya Naloyeva, Inal's activities are dated to the first quarter of the 14th century, and since the separation of the Kabardians from the main Circassian population occurred in the 11th–12th centuries, the Kabardians' migration to the Central Caucasus should not be associated with Inal.

According to the Kabardian ethnographer Shora Nogmov which he recorded Inal's legends in 19th century, Inal's abdication or death occurred in 1427; Nogmov didn't explain how this date was reached. Kabardian folklorist Askerbiy Shortanov suggested that Inal died in 1458, based on calculations from folklore, but this date has not been verified by any sources.

J. Barbaro who was a representative of a Venetian noble family in Tana in Northern Azov between the years 1436–1452, mentioned the Kremuk region of Circassia around 1452. It has been widely accepted from the other indications that this is a variant spelling of Chemguy in the Italian sources. Barbaro stated that the ruler of the Kremuk region was Biberd, the son of Kertibey. This information shows that the Inal lived earlier than this period.

According to Samir Khotko, the head of the Department of Ethnology and National Art of the Humanitarian Research Institute of the Republic of Adygea, there might have been two different Inals in history. Inal, the ancestor of the Western Circassian (Chemguy, Zhaney and Hatuqay) princes, lived in the early 14th century, while Inal, the ancestor of the Eastern Circassian (Kabardian and Besleney) princes, lived in the 15th century. This suggestion is based on two main points. In the 1310s, Özbek, who would become the khan of Golden Horde, was sent to Circassian region for protection and he was protected and trained by a leader named Inal Bek, according to the Ötemiş Hacı Tarihi, written by Ötemiş Hacı in the 16th century.

In a letter sent by the Kabardian princes to Elizaveta Petrovna in 1753, they stated that Inal lived during the reign of Canbek-Khan I of Crimea. Canbek-Khan's reign is dated between 1476 and 1478. This suggests that two different Inals may have lived at different times, and over time these figures could have been merged in collective memory.

Al-Mu'ayyad Shaykh was a Circassian-born slave who ascended to the Mamluk throne in the first half of the 15th century after the son of Barquq. He was brought to Egypt at a young age and bought by Sultan Barquq, for a high price due to his noble origin. According to Badr ad-Din Mahmud al-Ayni, who wrote Shaykh's biography and contemporary to him, Shaykh was the son of the fourth hereditary leader of a tribe called Karamuk; according to Khotko, Karamuk was a variant of the Italian sources' spelling Kremuk. Therefore, tracing back five generations from Shaykh to his 5th-generation grandfather places the latter in the early 14th century. Thus, it is possible to estimate the period in which the founder of the princely dynasty lived. Khotko suggested that Boletuqo was the founder (the 5th-generation grandfather of Shaykh) of the Boletuqo dynasty, and since Inal Bek and Boletuqo lived during the same period according to this suggestion, there may be a connection between them. Because this time period is also contemporaneous with the individual named Inal Bek, who protected Özbek Khan.

If we accept the oral tradition that Inal's son was Beslan and Beslan's son was Qanoqo, Inal can be dated to the mid-15th century, in a manner consistent with the information recorded from the Kabardian princes. The Battle of Kyzburun mentioned in the oral sources has been dated to 1537/1538 by the head of the Department of Medieval and Modern History at the Humanitarian Research Institute of Kabardino-Balkaria, Zaurbek Kojev. According to these oral accounts and the Circassian folk song that recounts the battle, Qanoqo and his grandchildren also participated in the battle. If Qanoqo was between 60 and 70 years old at that time, this places Inal's life in the middle of the 15th century.

Frédéric Montpéreux mistakenly suggests that Inal lived at the beginning of the 16th century, because he identified Tsapdia Inal Dafit mentioned in a 1509 battle in Georgian chronicles as the same person.

== Legacy ==
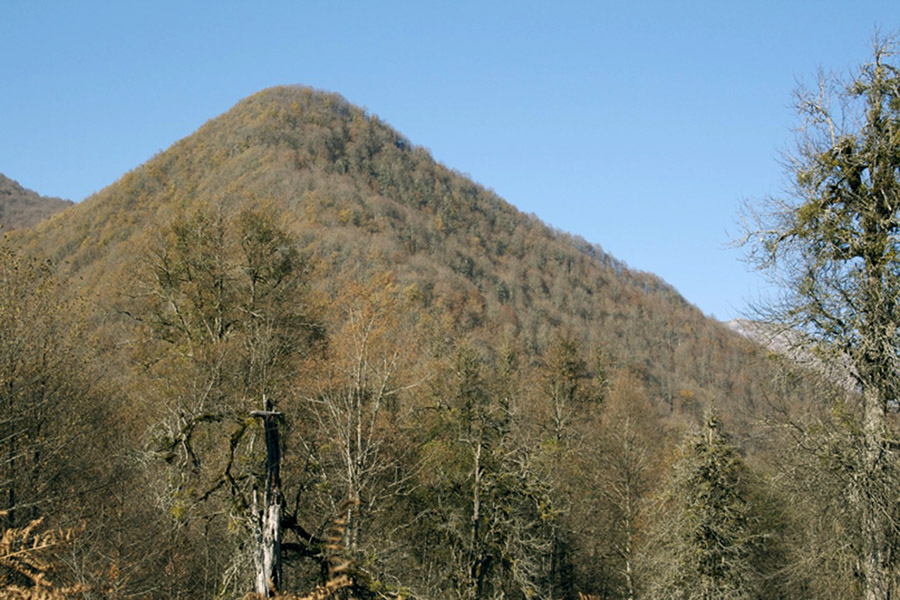
Abkhazian nationalists claim Inal-Quba in Pskhu is the burial site of Inal the Great

The Circassian and Abkhazian princes in following centuries claimed to be descendants of Inal and regarded him as their progenitor. Inal's name is also present in many geographical names in the Caucasus, as many places were named after him following his death. Place names associated with the name of Inal are found in Adygea, Krasnodar Krai, Kabardino-Balkaria, Karachay-Cherkessia and Abkhazia. On the Black Sea coast of Circassia, there is the Inal Bay. In the Zolsk region of the Republic of Kabardino-Balkaria, not far from Mount Kanzhal, there is mount Inal (2990 m) between Baksan River and Tyzyl valleys. Variations of Inal (Yinal, Inal, Yanal, etc.) are common names among Circassians and Abkhazians. There are many statues of Inal, especially in Abkhazia.

According to Circassian legends, Inal was regarded among the Circassians as a prudent, just, wise, and capable leader. He was declared a saint, and the saying "May God grant Inal's day(s)" became widespread among the people. According to Sultan Khan-Giray, Inal was regarded as a god by some Circassians and was seen as the God of Happiness.

Some Circassian clans preserved certain objects belonging to Inal up until the Circassian Genocide. A golden cross believed to have belonged to Inal was kept until the 19th century.

== Ancestors ==
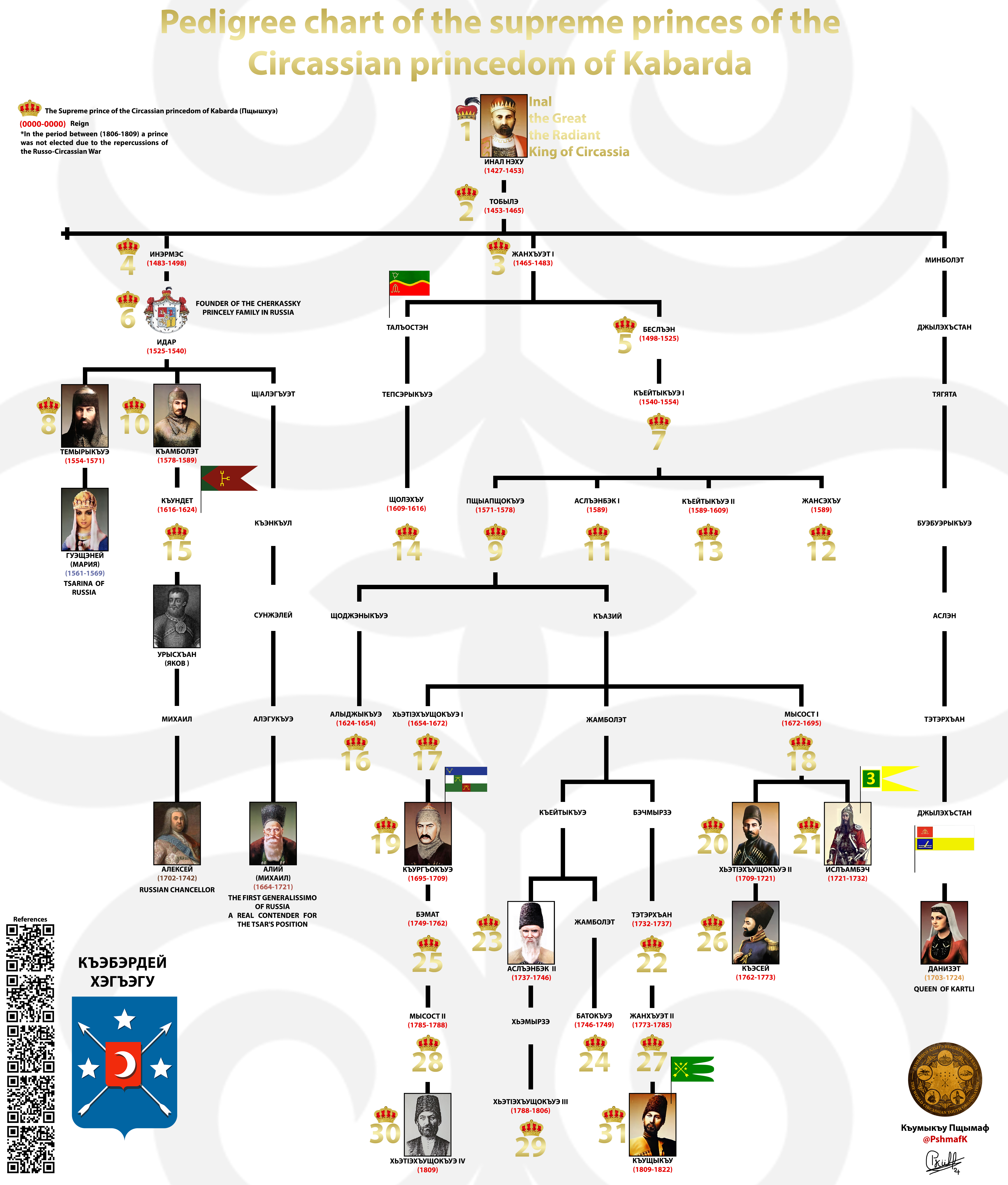
Princes Of East Circassia (Kabardia)

Abdun-Khan
Kess
Adu-Khan
Khurfatley
Inal

== Sources ==
- Caucasian Review. Vol. 2. Munich (München), 1956. Pp.; 19; 35.
- von Klaproth, Julius (2005). Travels in the Caucasus and Georgia performed in the years 1807 and 1808 by command of the Russian government. Elibron Classics. OCLC 742325358.
- Latham, Robert Gordon. Descriptive Ethnology. London: Voorst, 1859. Pp. 51.
- تاريخ الادغة القديم /The old history of the Adiga 1866 Chapter 5 or from page 79-86
