= Makhosh =

Extinct Circassian tribe

Мэхъош
- The tamga of the Bagharsuqu princely dynasty of the Makhosh and the Circassian flag

Total population
- 8.000 (1830s)

Languages
- Circassian language (Makhosh sub-dialect)

Religion
- Predominantly: Sunni Islam

Related ethnic groups
- Other Circassian tribes

The Makhosh (Adyghe: Мэхъош, romanized: Məxhoṩ) (Note: Russian: Махоши, Мухоши, Мухошевцы, Меххоши, Махошъ) were one of the Circassian tribes. The tribe was mostly annihilated in the Circassian genocide following the Russo-Circassian War.

== History ==
When the Bzhedug tribe was divided into four principalities, Prince Bagharsuqu settled in Northwestern Bzhedugia with his subjects. After a while, they migrated to the Thachigh forest, which would become their final settlement, and there they came to be known as "Makhosh." Makhoshs began to appear in written sources starting from the 17th century.

Respected for his wisdom and bravery, the Makhosh leader Prince Yakhboqu Bagharsuqu was killed in a war against the Abzakh, according to the oral sources. His successor, Bayzroqu Bagharsuqu, was also held in high regard.

The Makhosh led a more peaceful life compared to their neighbors. They maintained good relations with the neighboring tribes and were a respected group among the Circassians. Since they had only one princely family, their administrative system functioned without disruption, and internal conflicts were rare. They had vast and fertile pastures, leading to cattle breeding as their main source of living.

According to F. F. Tornau, the male population of the Makhosh Principality in the 1830s was 1,270. According to Fyodor Sherbina, the Makhosh population consisted of 400 households, totaling 8,000 people.

In the mid-18th century, they formed an alliance with the principalities of Chemguy, Bzhedug, and Besleney. This alliance defeated the larger Crimean army in the Battle of Ust-Labinsk in 1761.

=== Russo-Circassian War ===
Despite their small numbers, they took part in battles against the Russians during the Russo-Circassian War. In the early 19th century, Prince Khopach Bagharsuqu became renowned for his raids on the Russian border and was a close friend of Jankhot Qushuq, the Grand Prince of Kabardia. Tensions arose between Khopach and Kabardian prince Arslanbek, the son of Misost Bematiqo—who had married Khopach’s sister—after Arslanbek abandoned her and married another woman following the birth of their two children.

On October 18, 1824, General Velyaminov launched a raid against the Makhosh, but upon hearing of the impending attack, the Makhosh had already evacuated their villages. As a result, the Russians were only able to capture 24 prisoners and 700 cattle. Later, to compensate for the losses, the Makhosh and the Besleney sent captives in return.

In 1828, the Makhosh provided political and military support to Chemguy Grand Prince Jembulat Boletoqo. As a result, on September 8, 1828, Major General Antropov launched a punitive campaign against the Makhosh villages. Along with his detachment and allied Nogai princes, he carried out a surprise attack on Makhosh villagers who were plowing their fields. Although caught off guard, the Makhosh were more war-like people and had their rifles with them. While the outermost Makhosh were overwhelmed without resistance by the charge of the Cossack cavalry, those further in regrouped and opened a volley of fire with their rifles. The attacking Cossack cavalry ultimately killed the remaining Makhosh.

The surrounding Makhosh villages were quickly alerted. Soon after, Bagharsuqu prince arrived with 300 cavalry and defeated the scattered Cossacks without resistance. However, when Russian reinforcements arrived to rescue the Cossacks, the Makhosh were halted. The Nogai princes also attacked Bagharsuqu prince, allowing the reorganized Cossack cavalry to launch another assault.

The Makhosh suffered the loss of 70 noblemen and 42 captives. The Russians seized 40 horses, 270 cattle, and 4,500 sheep from the Makhosh. Their fields were burned and trampled.

On November 29, 1828, the Russians destroyed five Makhosh villages located along the Fars River and its tributaries. This was because the Makhosh had rejected all offers made by Turchaninov. When the Russian detachment approached, the Makhosh subjected it to heavy gunfire, inflicting significant losses until they were eventually pushed back by Cossack cavalry.

On February 19, 1834, the Makhosh village known in Russian sources as Tlabugay, located on a plain beyond the Laba River, was destroyed by General Zass’s detachment. During the attack, part of the population was killed, and the survivors went on to establish another village with the same name. In January 1837, seven Makhosh villages were forcibly relocated by General Zass to the Lower Laba River region. On March 24, 1844, the re-established village of Tlabugay was once again destroyed, this time by Colonel Richter. The survivors then founded three small villages.

In 1862, nine Makhosh villages were destroyed by a Russian detachment consisting of seven battalions, one Cossack unit, and four cannons.

Many groups of Makhosh were exiled to Ottoman lands, especially in the years 1858–1859, as documented in the Ottoman Archives. They live mostly in Samsun.

== Historical lands ==
They lived between the middle courses of the Laba and Belaya rivers and in the upper regions of the Fars. Previously, they had settled north of Batinkoy and west of the Laba River.

Table containing Makhosh villages recorded in 1858:

Makhosh villages (1858)
Name	House
Tlabugay	70
Tlabugay	60
Tlabugay	65
Village of Prince Pshimaf Natirbiy	60
Sozerukay	30
Sozerukay	45
Sozerukay	30
Mashoziy	70
Mamizhhabl	40
Zhudahabl	30
Chuzhhabl	45
Daguqoy	50

The only princely family of the Makhosh was Bagharsuqu/Baghursaqu, (Note: Adyghe: Багъырсэкъу, Бэгъарсыкъу, Russian: Багирсоков, Богорсуков, Багарсук) lived in the village of Sozerukay near the Fars River.

Makhosh noble families
Name	Circassian	Village
Skhapatchoqu	Шхъапацокъу	Skhapatchoqum yi Kuazh
Mamizh	Мамыжь	Mamizhhabl
Netirbiy	Нетырбый	Netirbiyhabl
Maf'adz	МэфIэдз	Maf'dziy
Tokhg	Тохг	Tokhghabl
Ashnashoqu	Ашнашокъу	Ashnashoqay
Leybkhgoqu	Лейбхгокъу	Leybkhgoqay
Deychiqu	Дейчыкъу	Deychiquay
Wortsey	Орцей	Wortseyhabl

== Records ==
1823: "Mukhoshi, mahash, mukhoshevtsy, at the foot of the Black Mountains. They own rivers from east to west " - Semyon Bogdanovich Bronevsky

1837 "The possession of Mekhhosh. This small possession is located to the west of the Beisleians along the rivers: Farz, Psfr and Kkell. The princely family owned and named Bogarsukovs, is not divided into branches. Bayzrokko, the current prince who leads the Mehkhosh people, is regarded as one of the excellent princes and warriors of the Circassian. Prince Yakhbokqo who preceded him, was killed in a fight with the Abadzekhs, and was the subject of a surprise to the Circassians in courage and intelligence. " - Sultan Khan-Girey

1839 "Mohosh, obeys the princes Bogorsuk. The Mokhoshevsky settlements are located on the left bank of the Laba, higher than the Yegerukaevsky residents. The Mokhoshevites have 1270 male souls. " - Fedor Fedorovich Tornau

1857 "Mohosh. The lands they occupy are irrigated by the Chehuraj, Belogiak and Shede streams. " - Leonty Yakovlevich Lyulie

1913 "Makhosh occupied a triangle, the sharp apex of which was at the confluence of the border marked above and the river. Laba, the same border and Laba served as legs, and the base was the border from the Abadzekhs, from Fars to the east to the river. Labe, north of the present Kostroma stanitsa and south of Zassovskaya. Makhosh, according to N. Kamenev, like the Yegeruqwai, separated from the Chemguy after the death of their common prince Bezruko Bolotokov. Earlier the Chemguy, the Yegeruqwai, and the Makhosh constituted one tribe of the Chemguy, or "kemgoy". " - Fedor Andreevich Shcherbina

== Literature ==
According to Ronald Wixman, the Makhosh lived between the middle Laba and Belaya River in the northwestern portion of the Caucasus. They were originally one of the ten major tribal divisions of the Adyghe people, each of which was previously considered a distinct set of people.

== Toponym ==
The ancient toponym - the name of the mountain "Makhoshkushkha" (near Maykop, near which the Petroglyphs of Mahoshkushkha were found) is associated with the Makhoshevites.

== Language ==
The Makhosh dialect belonged to Adyghe, the western branch of the Circassian languages. However, since they were on good terms with their neighbors especially with Besleney, their dialect showed similarities to the Besleney dialect, which is part of Eastern Circassian. The Makhosh dialect is not spoken today.

== Notes ==
1. Russian: Махоши, Мухоши, Мухошевцы, Меххоши, Махошъ
2. Adyghe: Багъырсэкъу, Бэгъарсыкъу, Russian: Багирсоков, Богорсуков, Багарсук
