= Ubykhia =

Historical region of Circassia

Ubykhia ТIуахъы Убых Хэку Аубла
- ?–1864
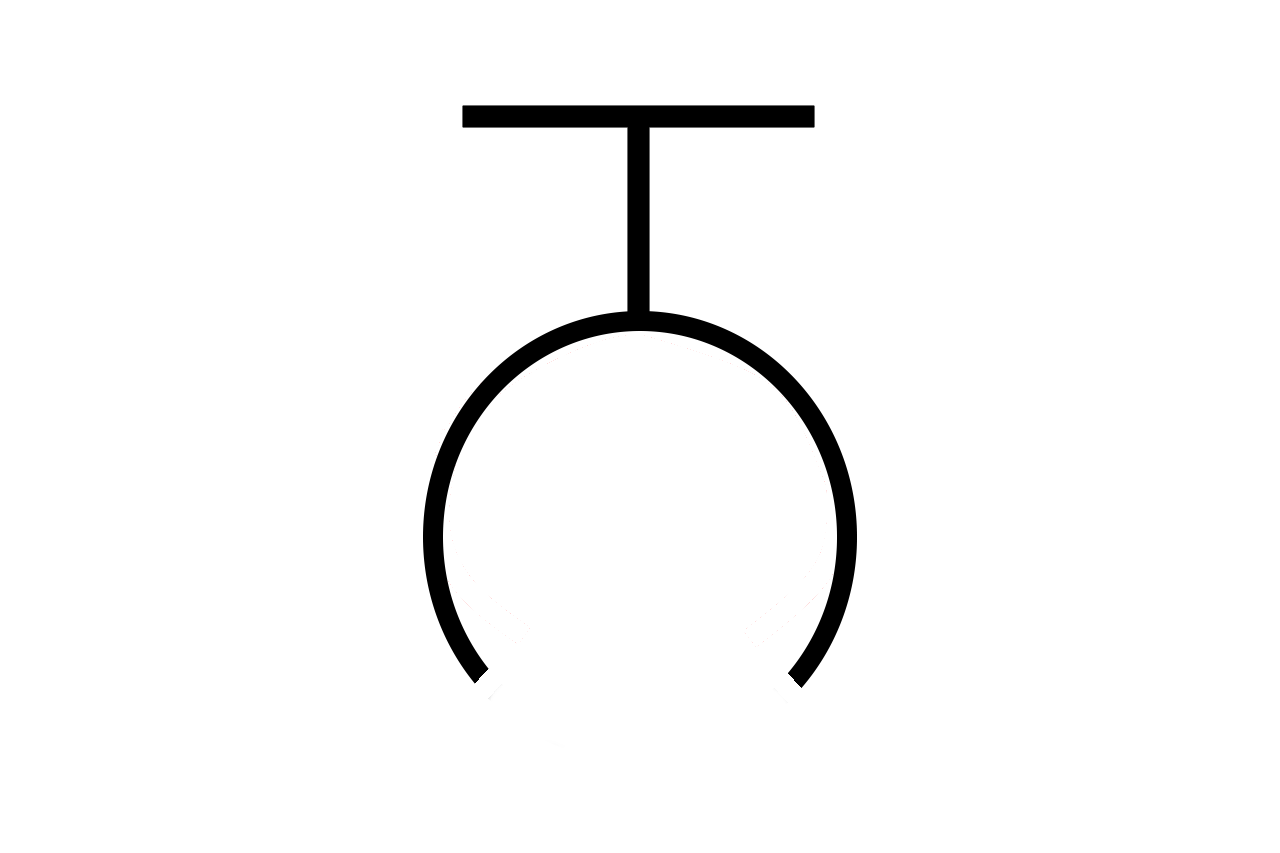
- Tamga of the House of Berzeg, one of the most influential clans of Ubykhia
- Status: Member of the Circassian Confederation
- Common languages: Ubykh; Circassian; Abkhaz
- Religion: Circassian paganism Orthodox Christianity (c. 5th c.-17th c.); Catholic Church (c. 14th c.); Islam (18th c.-1864)
- Government: Military democracy Tribal confederation
  - c. 16th c.: Dzepsh Kanshao
  - c. 16th/17th c.-1823: Saad-Girey Berzeg
  - 1823-1846: Ismail Berzeg
  - 1846-1864: Gerandiqo Berzeg
- Historical era: Early Modern
  - Established: ?
  - Disestablished: May 21st, 1864 1864

Population
  - 1864: 25,000−30,000
Preceded by	Succeeded by
Zichia	Russian Empire

Ubykhia (Ubykh: ТIуахъы; Убых Хэку; Аубла; Убыхия) was one of the historical regions of Circassia. It was inhabited by the Ubykh people, a Circassian tribe. It was a region located around Sochi. Ubykhia was ruled by the Berzeg and Dishan clans and elected elders, and was the last region to fall under Russian control during the Russo-Circassian War.

== History ==
=== Mythology ===
The most influential clan among the Ubykh tribes was the Berzeg ("Barzek", "Berzek", or "Berzek") family. According to a story compiled by Kâzım Berzeg from members of the Berzeg family, a blood feud broke out between two noble families 1500 years ago, resulting in the complete annihilation of one of the families, with only the women surviving. One of those women gave birth to a boy and named him Berzeg. The Berzeg clan descends from him, according to this legend.

=== Early history ===
It is mentioned in Abkhaz oral history that in the mid-16th century, the Ubykh prince Kanshao of the Dzepsh (Дзэпщ; Диман) family purchased the lands of present-day Wardane from the Abkhaz Lou family.

Ubykhia is mentioned in Russian sources starting from the 17th century. Ubykhia covered the entirety of the modern Tsentralny and Khostinsky city districts and parts of the Lazarevsky City District.

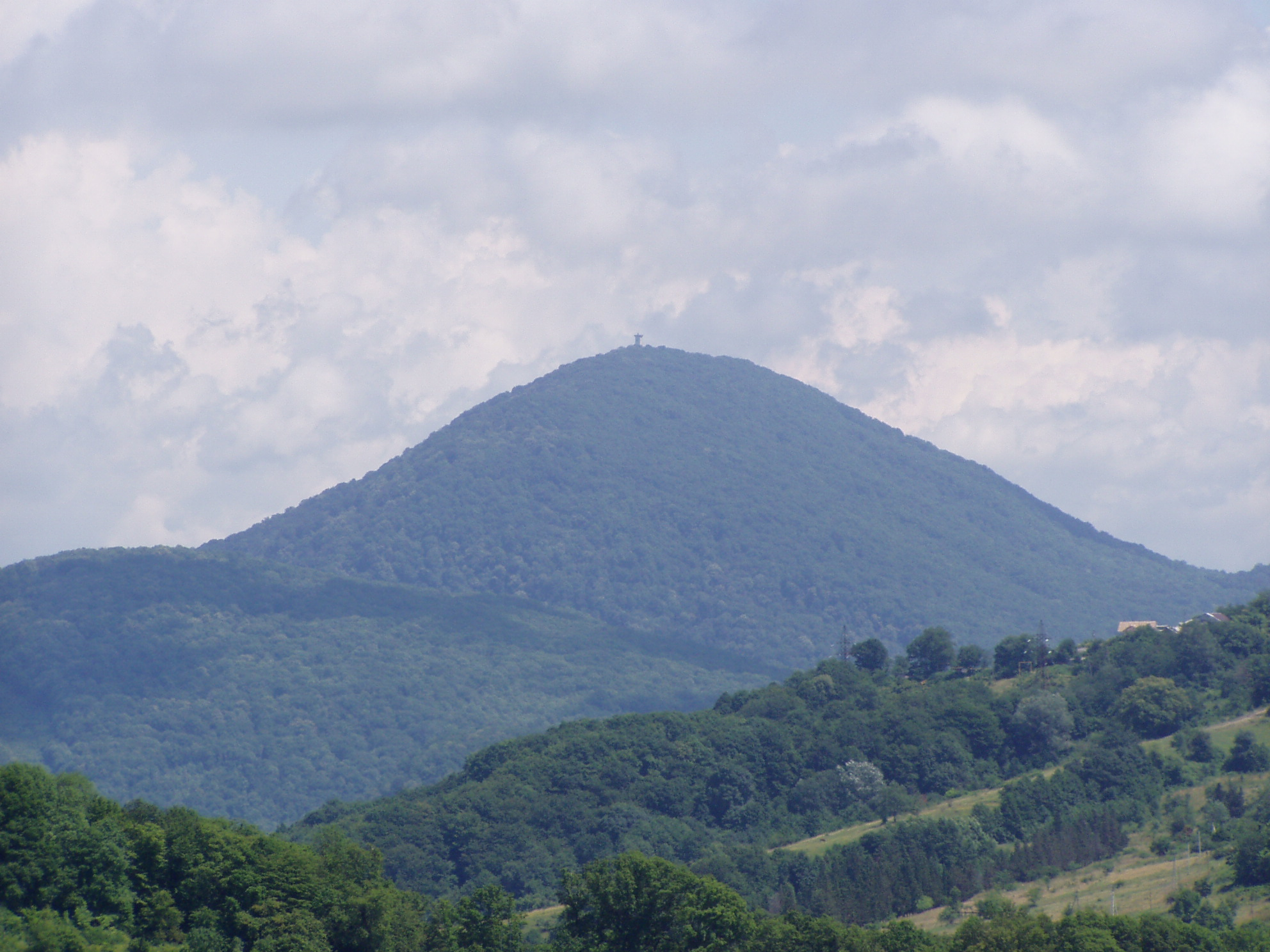
Mount Akhun is considered sacred by the Ubykhs

In the 17th century, the Ubykhs seized the lands of the Sadz Abazins. Unlike the order in Abkhazia, there was no prince in Ubykhia; it was governed by a council consisting of 11 Ubykh sub-councils and 2 nobles from the Akhchipsou and Sadz peoples. Due to its coastal location, Ubykhia was in constant contact with the Ottomans and developed friendly relations with them over time, eventually becoming Muslim along with other Circassian regions.

=== Russo-Circassian War ===
In 1763, the Russo-Circassian War broke out. In 1823, following the death of Saad-Girey, Ismail Berzeg was elected leader of the Berzeg clan and commander-in-chief of the entire Ubykh region. Starting in 1827, Berzeg attempted to organize a military confederation consisting of Circassians living on the Black Sea coast. By the end of 1839, he had united the population between Tuapse and Gagra into a union. Other Circassians outside this region also accepted his authority, despite being much more autonomous. During this period, James Bell described him as the "Circassian Washington". In the summer of 1838, 1250 people from all regions of Circassia signed a petition and sent it to the Queen of the United Kingdom and the British government. Ismail Berzeg's signature appeared at the top of the list.

In 1840, the Ubykhs led by Ismail Berzeg organized an attack on Russian coastal forts. In February and March, the Siege of Lazarevsky, Siege of Velyaminovsky, and Siege of Mikhailovsky took place. Attempts were made to occupy the Adler, Golovinskoe, and Navaginskoe forts. Chechen and Dagestani rebels in the Eastern Caucasus were also inspired by the Circassian victories.

Upon Ismail Berzeg's death in 1846, Gerandiqo Berzeg was elected as the leader of the Ubykh region. On May 14, 1846, Berzeg wrote the following to Adam Czartoryski, President of the Polish National Government:

Our peoples are united by the desire for freedom and independence, as well as the presence of a common enemy. I will welcome Poles and others who desert from the Russian army and treat them well. I will also accept Major Kazimir Gordon of the Artillery and Engineering Corps into Circassia with me, take very good care of him, and provide him with everything he needs to help us in our struggle against the common enemy. We will listen to his advice and treat him like an envoy of the Polish president.

Ubykhia played an important role in the Russo-Circassian War, particularly in the last 30 years. During this period, the population of Ubykhia was approximately 25,000 or 30,000 people.

==== Circassian Majlis ====
Following a decision made at a meeting among Circassian leaders to establish a fully European-style parliament, the Circassian Majlis was founded on June 13, 1861. The region of Sache, known today as Sochi, was chosen as the center of the Majlis. The Ubykh leader Geranduko Berzeg was elected as the head of the Majlis and the president of Circassia. The Majlis government met with Russian Tsar Alexander II in September 1861 to establish peace, and Berzeg tried to persuade the Russian tsar:

These lands are ours and we try to rule them fairly, therefore we treat our people justly and respect the lives and property of those who visit us. What then is the objective of a powerful country like yours: to destroy a people like us? Be just toward us, do not destroy our property and mosques; it is shameful for a powerful state to take lives unjustly. You are deceiving the whole world by spreading rumors that we are a savage people. Do not try to spill our blood; allow us to exist here.

— Gerandiqo Berzeg to Tsar Alexander II

However, the Tsar consistently continued the policy of his father, Nicholas I, and rejected the Circassian proposals. The Majlis held a meeting and decided to reject the Russian demands. The Majlis quickly sent delegations to the Ottoman Empire and the United Kingdom to gain support from both countries. British delegates promised recognition of an independent Circassia, as well as possible recognition from Paris, if they united in a coherent state. In the Ottoman Empire, a special committee on Circassian affairs was created, and donations were received from the local Muslim population. The Majlis building was burned down by a landing force in July 1862. After this, Majlis meetings began to be held in the region of Mutıxwa (present-day 'Plastunki'), the hometown of the Majlis President Gerandiqo Berzeg.

==== Battle of Qbaade ====
On May 21, 1864, the Battle of Qbaada took place in Ubykhia. Following the defeat, Geranduko Berzeg was torn between ending the war and continuing to resist. He consulted with Islamic scholars to discuss the issue and even met with the Prince of Abkhazia, Mikhail Chachba. While he was away, his army of 3,000 was completely destroyed. Although he initially decided to continue resistance after this, unable to gather enough soldiers, Berzeg announced on March 24, 1864, that the Circassians would cease military activities, and he was sent into exile in Ottoman lands. Subsequently, during the Circassian Genocide, the Ubykh population was exiled en masse to the Ottoman Empire. This event led to the total disappearance of the Ubykh from Ubykhia.

== Settlement ==
Ubykhia is a region on the Black Sea coast north of present-day Abkhazia, between the settlements of Circassians and Abazins. The city of Sochi is within historical Ubykhia. Ubykh clans such as Wardan, Sashe, Khize, Subeshkh, and Alani used to live there. The first two of these were considered the most prominent economically and socially, living in the valleys of the Vardan and Sochi rivers. They were particularly advanced in agriculture and horticulture.

== Language ==
Ubykh belongs to the Northwest Caucasian languages family of Caucasian languages and is related to Abkhaz. With the migration of the Ubykhs, no one left in the Caucasus spoke this language. The Ubykhs who settled in Turkey also forgot this unwritten language over time. Tevfik Esenç was the last person to speak Ubykh, and he worked with the famous French scholar Georges Dumézil on the grammar and dictionary of Ubykh. With the death of Tevfik Esenç (1904 – October 7, 1992), Ubykh became one of the extinct languages.

== Religion ==
It is the tradition of the early church that Christianity made its first appearance in Circassia in the 1st century AD via the travels and preaching of the Apostle Andrew, but recorded history suggests that, as a result of Greek and Byzantine influence, Christianity first spread throughout Circassia between the 3rd and 5th centuries AD. In particular, the Byzantine Empire sent many clergy to the Circassian lands. During this period, Jesus was considered not a central figure of God, but rather an entity added to the pantheon of deities. The chief deity was still Thashkho. The most significant change Christianity brought to the Circassian belief system was the physical representation of God through icons (Adyghe: Тхьэнапэ). These icons included the Mother of God (Adyghe: Тхьэнанэ) and the Holy Spirit (Adyghe: Тхьэм ипсэ). The Circassians called Christianity "Chelehstan" (Чэлэхьстэн) or "Chiristan" (Чыристэн[ыгъэ]) Christmas "Khurome" (Хъуромэ), Easter "Utizh" (ӏутӏыжь), priests "Shodjen" (Adyghe: Шэуджэн, Kabardian: Щоджэн) and pastors "Shekhnik." Religious ceremonies and prayers were conducted in Greek. Furthermore, Elijah was held in high esteem, called "Yele" (Елэ), and associated with the lightning god Shible. For the Circassians, the most influential and revered figure in Christianity was St. George (Adyghe: Аушыджэр). Zikhia (Circassia) held a significant place in the Orthodox world. The region housed four ancient bishoprics: Sinopoli, Phanagoria (Matrega), Nikopsia, and Tmutarakan. Towards the end of the 13th century, the Diocese of Zichia was elevated to metropolitan status. From 1318 onward, sources mention an independent Zichia metropolis known as "Zicho-Matarch." According to Priest Ricasdus, the Circassians considered themselves Orthodox Christians and used Greek as their written language. Despite all these developments, Christianity never truly took root among the Circassian people. It merged with local pagan beliefs, transforming into a semi-pagan, semi-Christian faith. The Virgin Mary was considered both the Mother of God and the Goddess of Bees, while Jesus was identified with Thashkho, the Circassian chief deity. Following the Mongol invasions and Timur's campaigns, connections with the main churches in Circassia were severed, and bishoprics gradually disappeared. With the outbreak of the Russo-Circassian War, Christianity began to be perceived by the Circassians as the "religion of the Russians." As a result, those who maintained their Christian faith gradually abandoned their faith and Christianity began to face severe public backlash. The last traces of Christianity in Circassia survived until the 1830s.

With the conquest of Trebizond in 1461, Ottoman influence extended to Circassia, and many Circassian aristocrats embraced Sunni Islam. However, even by the 16th century, Muslims were a minority in Circassia; most of the population still practiced Christianity or traditional pagan beliefs. Evliya Çelebi, who visited Circassia in 1666, wrote that mosques existed in the villages and that the people chanted "la ilahe illallah" (There is no god but Allah), but they failed to fully grasp Islam and continued their old traditions. During the same period, Katip Çelebi stated that some Circassians were Muslim, while others were still considered "infidels". By the late 18th century, Islam began to spread more rapidly among the Circassians. In 1779, with the encouragement of Ferah Ali Pasha, 85 new mosques were built in Circassia. The activities of wandering Sufis and the threat of invasion from Russia further accelerated the Islamization process in Circassia. Circassian scholars who grew up in Ottoman lands also played a significant role in this process. Throughout the 19th century, the vast majority of Circassians were Muslim. In 1826, Islam was declared the official religion of all Circassia.
