= A Petition from Circassian leaders to Her Majesty Queen Victoria =

Part of the Circassian genocide

- Created: Shawwal 29, 1280 (7 April 1864)
- Author: Prominent Circassian leaders
- Signatories: Circassia
- Subject: Circassian genocide

A Petition from Circassian leaders to Her Majesty Queen Victoria was a document sent by Circassian leaders to Queen Victoria on 7 April 1864 complaining about Russian genocidal actions that made up the Circassian genocide. The document requests British military aid, or in the worst case, humanitarian aid, to the Circassian people. Only the English version of the text exists today. Presumably, however, it was written in Ottoman Turkish, and then translated to English by Henry Bulwer, the British ambassador in Istanbul.

== Background ==
During the reign of Catherine II the Russian army started entering Circassian soil and Russia started building forts in an attempt to quickly annex Circassia. Thus began the first hostilities between the Circassians and the Russian Empire. From 1802 to 1806 general Pavel Tsitsianov led campaigns in Circassia and targeted Circassian villages. He referred to the Circassians as "untrustworthy swine" to "show how insignificant they are compared to Russia". In 1808, a Russian commission decided that in order to end Circassian resistance against the Russian Empire, the Circassians would need to be eliminated from their homeland. Since then, systematic mass murder of Circassians was a common strategy.

In 1857, Dmitry Milyutin published the idea of mass expulsions of Circassian natives. Milyutin argued that the goal was not to simply move them so that their land could be settled by productive farmers, but rather that "eliminating the Circassians was to be an end in itself – to cleanse the land of hostile elements". Tsar Alexander II endorsed the plans. Although the order given by Tsar Alexander II was to deport the remaining Circassians rather than to completely mass murder them, the Russian commanders were open to the idea of massacring large portions of the Circassian population. Richmond has noted that "reports abound" of massacres in the final stages of the Caucasus campaign.

In 1860, the Circassian Parliament was founded. In 1864, the Circassian leaders signed the document to be issued to Queen Victoria.

== Text ==
The document requests intervention from the British government against the Russians, or humanitarian assistance in the event that this is not achieved. It is addressed to the British ambassador to the Ottoman Empire, Henry Bulwer.
