= Ubykh =

Ubykh may refer to:

- Ubykh language
- Ubykh people
- Ubykhia, a historical land of Ubykhs
