= Yismel Berzeg =

Circassian military commander and politician

Hajji Thamade Yismel Dogomuqo Berzeg
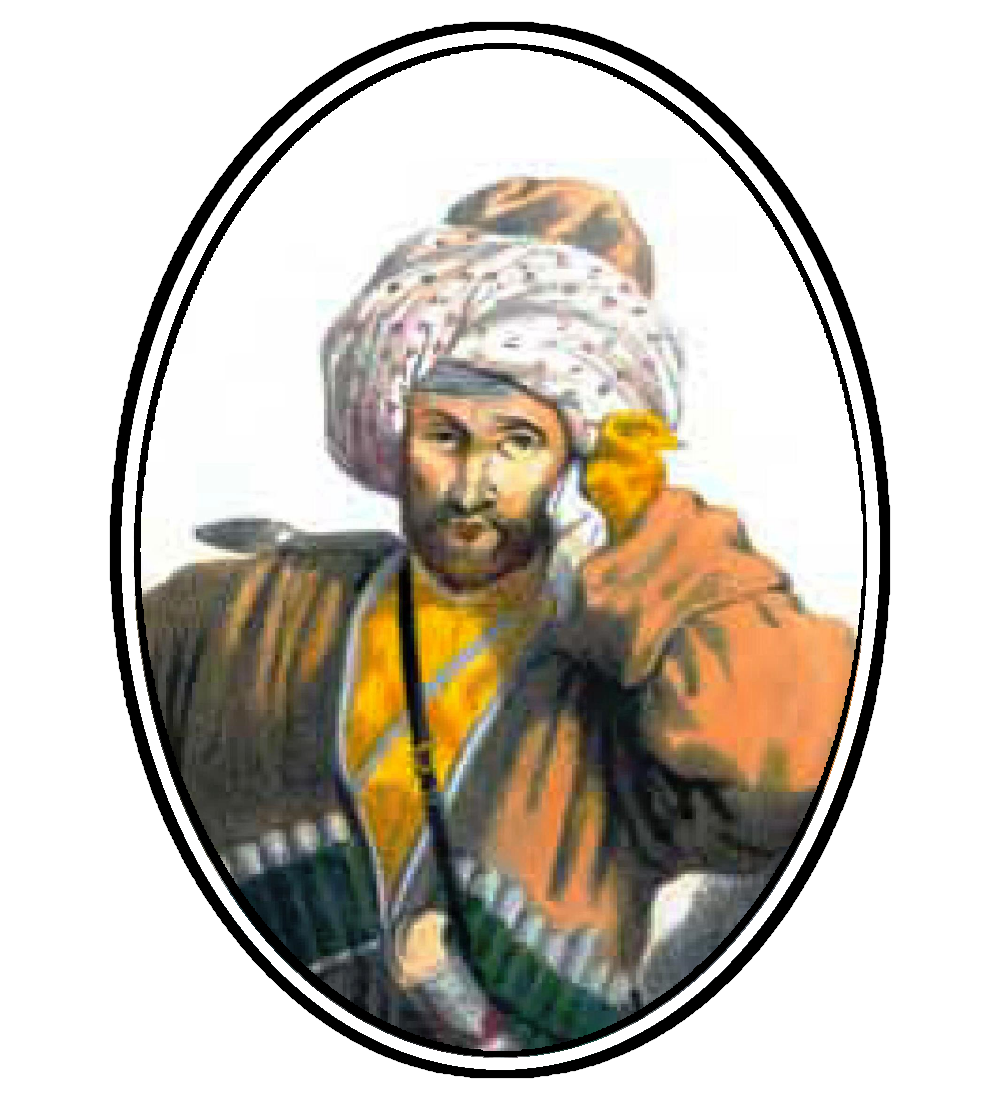
- Portrait attributed to Ismail or his son, 1840

Confederate Leader of Circassia (de facto)
- In office 1827–1839
- Preceded by: Qalebatuqo Hatuqay (de jure)
- Succeeded by: Hawduqo Mansur (de jure)

Princely Leader of the Ubykh
- In office 1823–1846
- Preceded by: Saad Berzeg
- Succeeded by: Qerandiqo Berzeg

Personal details
- Born: 1766 Ubykhia, Circassia
- Died: 1846 (aged 82–83) Mecca, Ottoman Empire
- Party: National Oath
- Children: 9 sons

Military service
- Allegiance: Circassian Confederation; Ubykh Principality
- Battles/wars: Russo-Circassian War

Hajji Yismel (Ismail) Dogomuqo Berzeg (1766–1846) was a Circassian military commander and politician who served as the leader of the Circassian Confederation from 1827 to 1839. He was also the princely leader of the Ubykh tribe and member of House of Berzeg. He took part in both military and political capacity in the Russo-Circassian War. After 1838, he acted as a diplomat between Circassia and England.

== Early life ==
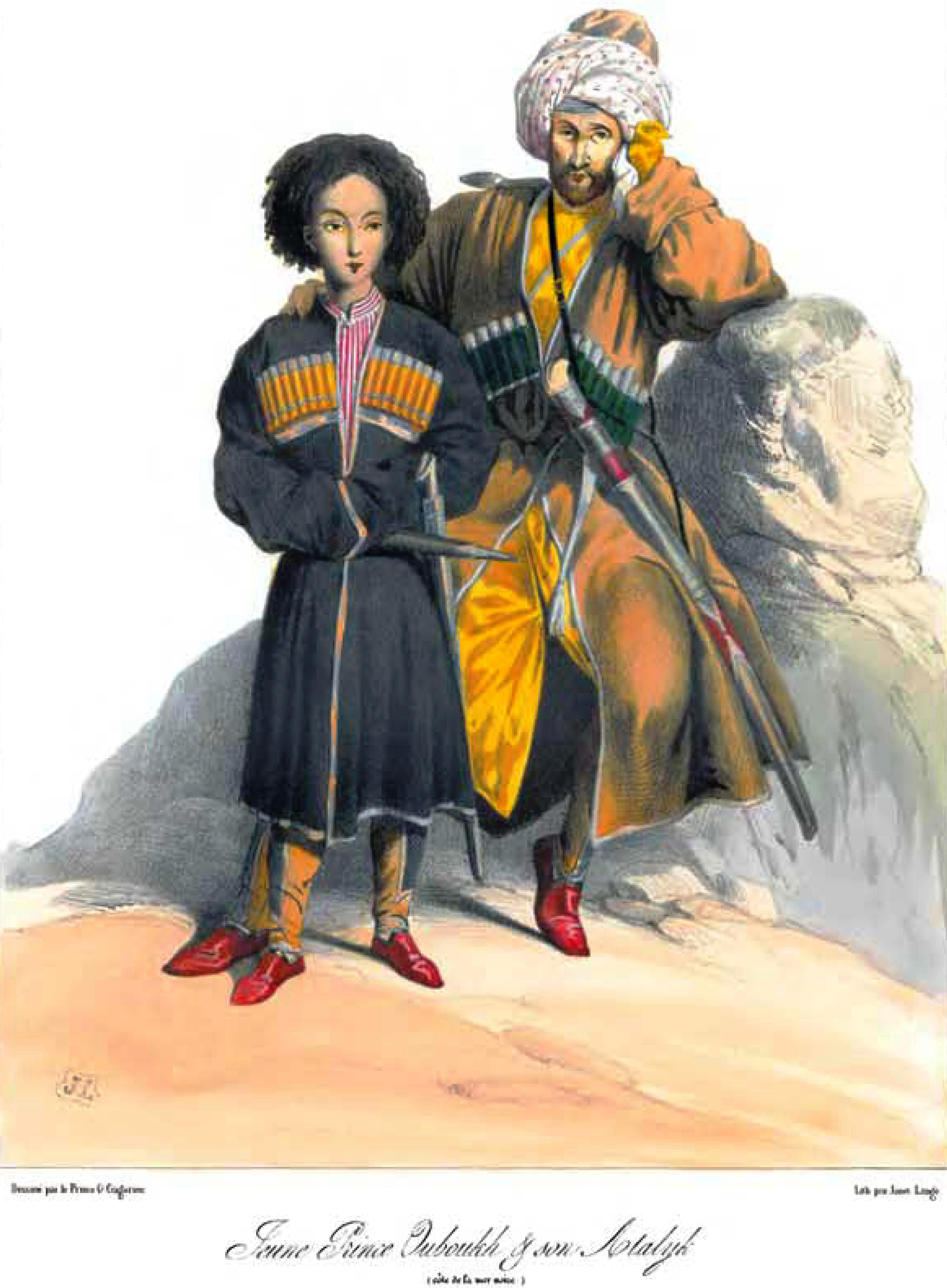
"Ubykh prince and his atalyk"

Berzeg was born in 1766 to the princely House of Berzeg in Ubykhia. English agent and traveler James Bell noted that each Berzeg family member could send 150 men to the battlefield, a combined 3,000 warriors. Saad-Girey Berzeg, Yismel's predecessor, was the Ubykh leader at the beginning of the 19th century. In 1823, after Saad-Girey's death, Yismel was elected leader of the Berzeg clan and the commander of all Ubykhs. Yismel lived in the valley of the Sochi River, on its right bank, two hours from the sea.

Bell described Yismel Dogomuko Berzeg: "He was a tall man with beautiful gray eyes. His influence was determined not only by belonging to the strongest surname among the Ubykhs, but also by his ebullient energy, courage and intelligence." Bell described him as a religious Muslim.

Beginning in 1827, Yismel engaged in organizing a military confederation of the tribes living on the Black Sea coast. By the end of 1839, he had united the population between Tuapse and Gagra into a union. During this period Bell characterized him as, "Circassian Washington". At an old age, in 1835, during the assault on Gagra, Berzeg was seriously wounded. In 1836 he commanded the Ubykh detachment during another raid. In the war, Hajji Yismel lost all nine of his sons.

In 1840, Berzeg organized an attack on Russian coastal outposts. In February-March, the Ubykhs stormed the fortresses of Lazarevskoe, Velyaminovskoe and Mikhailovskoe on the Vulan River. Attempts were made to occupy Adler, Golovinskoe and Navaginskoe forts.

Russian troops made great efforts to recapture these strongholds. Later that year, Berzeg organized a punitive campaign against the Abaza clans on the coast, who did not take part in the anti-Russian struggle.

In 1841, he participated in negotiations with Russian military leaders in Sochi, but the negotiations failed. Russian leaders stated that the Circassians were "poor villagers waiting for help from the English". A Russian officer, Lorer, who witnessed Yismel Berzeg's meeting with the Russians, later wrote in his memoirs:

I must say, General, your statements truly astound me. If your master, the Tsar, is so wealthy, and we are so poor and barbaric, why does your master envy us and forbid us from living in our humble mountains? Your lord appears to be greedy and lustful. I'm afraid, sir, we won't be surrendering the Englishmen and Turkish pashas in our lands; we can not abandon them because they are our friends and visitors. No amount of gold or silver, I swear to God, will be able to deviate us from the path of honor.

— Ismail Berzeg

In 1846, Berzeg, together with his nephew Gerandiqo Berzeg, fought many battles with the Russian armies before leaving for Hajj. He died that year returning home.
