= Parliament of Independence (Circassia) =

1861–64 legislature of Circassia

The Circassian Parliament Шъхьафитныгъэ Хасэ
- Parliament of Circassia
- Variant of the Circassian flag used by the Parliament

Type
- Type: Unicameral

History
- Founded: 13 June 1861 (165 years ago)
- Disbanded: 21 May 1864 (162 years ago)
- Preceded by: Tlepq Zefes (People's Council); National Oath

Leadership
- Chairman: Gerandiqo Berzeg
- Abzakh Representative: Hasan Bish
- Shapsug Representative: Islam Thaushe
- Kabardian Representative: Aslan Besleniyiqo
- Other important members: Qarabatir Zanuqo (son of Sefer Bey Zanuqo); Ismail Braqiy; Ibrahim Thaushe; Muhammad Khusht; Ipa Dziash; Nafu; Ahmad Ali; Ibrahim-Ali

Structure
- Political groups: Government: Founding Members; Ubykh; Natukhaj representatives (Government in-exile); Shapsug; Other Members; Hatuqay; Abzakh; Bzhedug representatives (Government in-exile); Chemguy; Kabardian representatives (Government in-exile)

Elections
- First election: 13 June 1861
- Last election: 13 June 1861

Meeting place
- Ş̂açə (Modern-day Sochi) (1861-1862)
- Mutıxwa (Modern-day Plastunki) (1862-1864)
- Qbaada (Modern-day Krasnaya Polyana) (1864)

The Circassian Parliament or the Circassian Majlis (Adyghe: Адыгэ Хасэ, romanized: Adygə Xasə, IPA: [aːdɘɣə́ xaːsə́]), also called the Great Parliament of Independence (Шъхьафитныгъэ Хасэшхо), was the legislature of Circassia officialized in 1861 after a meeting in Sochi attended by leaders of several Circassian provinces. A tribal confederation had existed before the parliament's establishment, but a centralized government was achieved only after it was built.

The parliament aimed to defend the western part of Circassia from Russian invasion, and to liberate the occupied Eastern Circassia from the Russian Empire during the Russian-Circassian War. It also sent delegates abroad to gain support for the Circassian struggle internationally. After the parliament was dissolved by Russian forces, some members sent a letter "A Petition from Circassian leaders to Her Majesty Queen Victoria" requesting humanitarian aid from the British Empire.

== History ==
=== Previous parliaments ===
Traditional tribal councils have always existed in Circassia. In the 1700s, different Circassian regions began to meet every year to hold a council and to rule the country jointly, thus beginning the unification process of Circassia and establishing the Circassian Confederation. The centralization process accelerated as time went by. The first western-type parliament in Circassia was called in 1820 with 300 people. Important names such as Kizbech Tughuzhuqo were present in the assembly. These assemblies were developing against Russian expansionism among the region. Following the Treaty of Adrianople in 1829, the Circassians established a new assembly called the "National Oath Parliament" (Adyghe: Чылэ Тхьэрыӏо Хасэ).

One of the largest of these assemblies was held in Ubin in 1834, where the Circassian flag was adopted. British travelers Edmund Spencer and David Urquhart also attended this assembly:

It was then that the valiant chief, Hirsis Sultan Oglou, unfurled the splendid national banner he had just received from Stamboul, wrought by the beautiful hands of a Circassian princess, occupying a high station in the Turkish empire.

At the sight of the long expected national flag, thousands of swords flew in the air, and one universal long-continued shout of joy burst from the immense multitude. Never was there a greater display of enthusiasm, nor a fiercer de- termination exhibited by a people to defend their fatherland. Their common danger having awakened in their breasts, for the first time, a sense of the necessity of union, as the first and most necessary element to ensure success, every male throughout the whole country has sworn never to submit to the Russians, nor to enter into any commercial relation, nor hold any communication with them, under any pretence.

The eternal feuds which had heretofore subsisted between chief and chief, tribe and tribe, have ceased; and those Circassians which had hitherto ravaged each other's territories, are now to be seen hand in hand, united by the closest bonds of fellowship.

— Edmund Spencer

=== 1861 parliament ===
Being a political resistance council and the legislature of Circassia, the parliament was established in the capital city of Sochi (Adyghe: Шъачэ, romanized: Ş̂açə) on June 13, 1861 and Qerandiqo Berzeg was elected as the head of the parliament and the nation. Although the Shapsug, Natukhaj, and Ubykh were the main founders, representatives from the Hatuqay, Abzakh, Bzhedug, Kabardian and Chemguy regions were also present. Abkhazians and Abazins were also represented in the parliament. Nobles, elders and commanders of all social backgrounds gathered to discuss the immediate need to collaborate and work together regardless of their ideological, ethnic, religious or social divisions for the sake of survival. In an effort to raise awareness, the council formally drafted and declared the independent state of Circassia to the world and immediately sought to have the Circassian nation recognized, as well as redouble efforts to secure arms and material support to finance their self-defense campaigns. Gerandiqo Berzeg elected as the chairman of the parliament. This assembly was the common government of Circassia. Abkhazians from the Sadz region also participated in the construction of the parliament building. The parliament building also contained a court, a mosque and guesthouses. They discussed tactics, planned alliances and made efforts to prepare for a last stand (see Qbaada last stand).

The parliament officially declared the independent Circassian state to the global world and sought to double its efforts to gain recognition of the Circassian nation as well as to secure weapons and material support to finance defense operations. In August 1861, the parliament submitted a declaration to the British consulate in Sukhumi explaining the political situation and aspirations of the Circassians:

"On 4 Dhu al-Hijjah 1277 (June 13, 1861), all Circassians were invited to the Parliament to unite their strength and establish independence. They unanimously agreed to form an extraordinary union to maintain internal order and to comply with it. Those who disregard this union shall be punished.

In the Circassian region, a Parliament composed of 15 scholars and intellectuals was established. This Parliament was named the “Great Parliament of Independence.” By order of the Parliament, 12 provinces were established in our country. Each province has a mufti, a qadi (judge), and a headman. These officials must comply with the orders of the Parliament and act in unity and harmony.

From the property of every Circassian, one out of every hundred is collected. In this way, they fulfill the order of the provincial court: to collect income and distribute taxes, to recover and monitor usurped properties. In any case, revenues exceeded expenditures, and praise be to God, the Great Parliament of Independence that governs the country is serving its purpose."

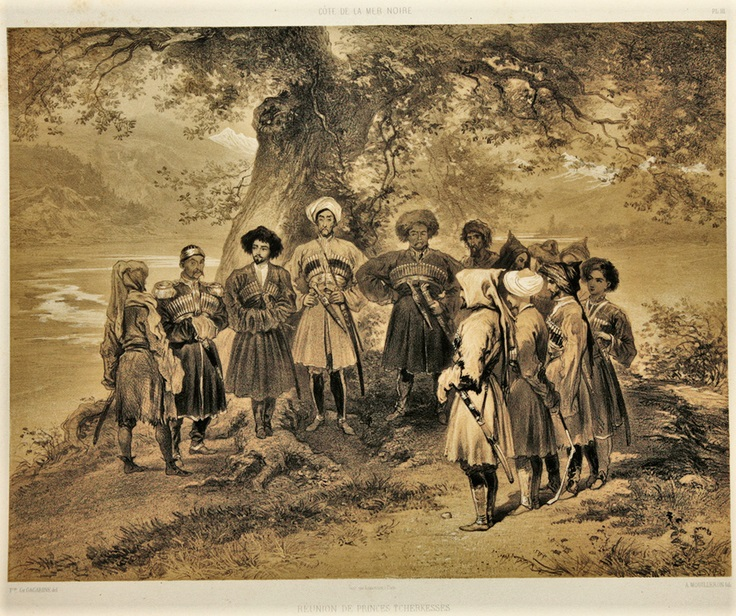
Meeting of Circassian princes in Sochi, 1847. Although the painting depicts an event of an earlier time, it gives an idea of the appearance of the Circassian aristocracy. Painting by Grigory Gagarin.

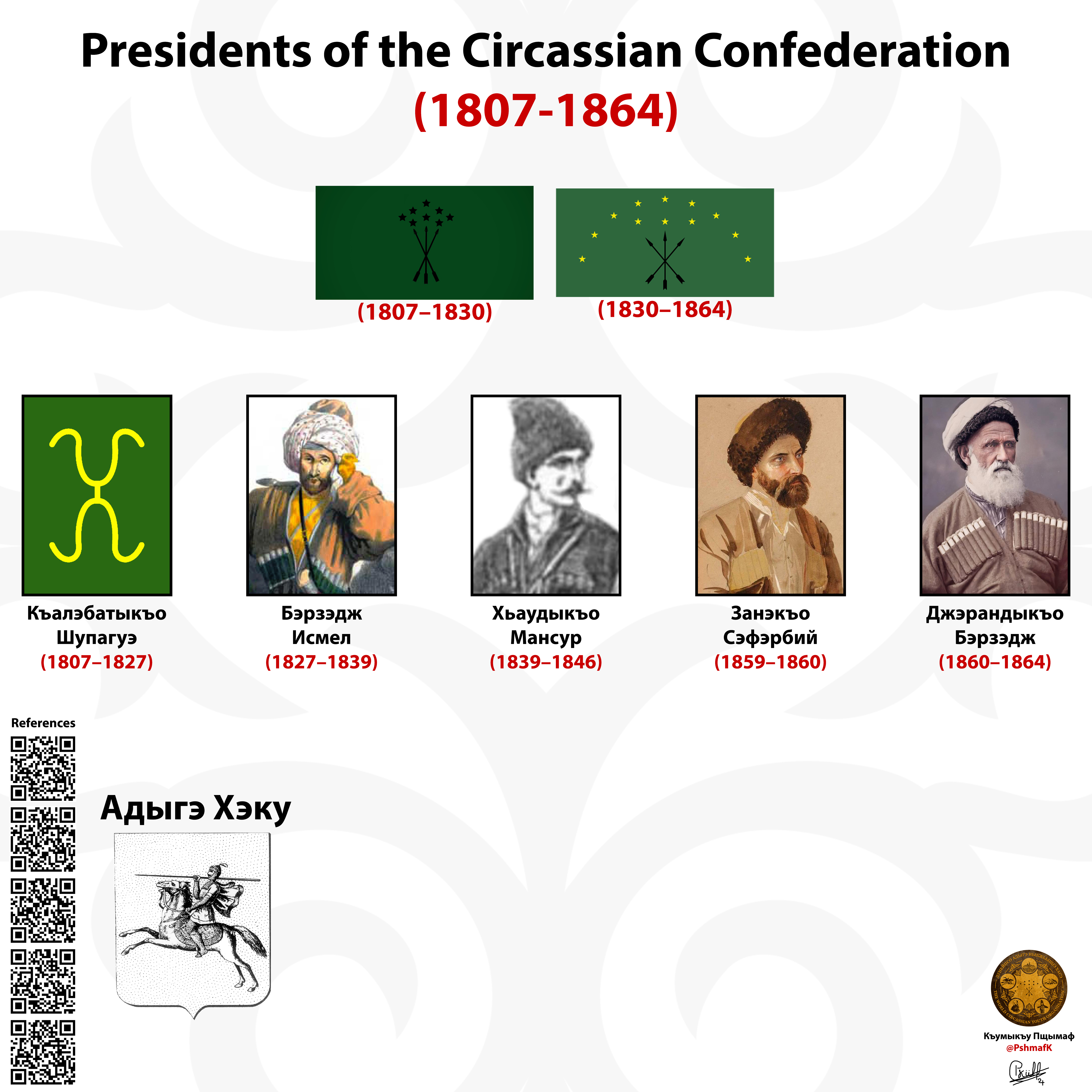
Presidents of the Circassian Confederation

==== The first decisions ====
The decisions taken by the parliament were the following:

- The "Independent State of Circassia" is an independent state, as proclaimed once again on this day.
- The country's flag consists of three yellow arrows and twelve stars on green.
- The established parliament represents all Circassians regardless of tribe.
- Unity will be enforced by force if necessary.
- The initial parliament consists of 15 members.
- The country will be divided into 12 regions, each of which will be appointed administrators responsible for administrative, legal and security, these administrators will act on behalf of the assembly.
- Regional administrators will collect taxes on behalf of the council, the cost of 5 cavalry per 100 households will be charged, and every 100 families will send 5 cavalry to the army. The collected taxes will be spent in the most beneficial way for the country's affairs in the name of the independence of Circassia.
- A government building and guesthouses will be built on behalf of the state administration.
- A justice system will be established immediately to enforce the law.
- Abkhazian, Abazin people will be accepted as legitimate equal citizens of Circassia along with Circassians.
- Proper contact with the Circassian and Muslim communities in Constantinople and London will be established.
- Under no circumstances shall Circassia surrender to Russia. Agreements will be made with Russia on equal terms through negotiations; if this is not possible, the war will continue.

==== Negotiations with Russia ====
The parliament government negotiated with the Russian Tsar Alexander II in September 1861 to establish peace, expressing their readiness to accept Russian citizenship.

These lands are ours, and we want to rule them with absolute justice. We strive to administer our country fairly, therefore we treat our people fairly and respect the lives and property of those who visit us. What is the objective of a powerful nation like yours: to destroy a people like us? Be fair to us and do not destroy our property or mosques; it is disgraceful for a powerful state to take lives unjustly. You are deceiving the entire world by circulating myths about us being a savage people; nonetheless, we are human, just like you. Do not strive to spill our blood; instead, allow us to exist here.

— Circassian leader Gerandiqo Berzeg's proposal to Tsar Alexander II of Russia

However, the annexation of Circassia was not enough for the Russian government, as Tsarist government sought to evict the Circassians from the ethnic territory. The Tsar consistently continued the policy of his father, Nicholas I, and rejected the Circassian peace proposals.

After being convinced by his generals, the Russian Tsar declared that Circassia will not only be annexed to Russia unconditionally, but the Circassians will leave, and if the Circassian people do not accept forcefully migrating to Turkey, the Russian generals will see no problem in killing all Circassians. He gave the Circassian representatives a month to decide.

=== Delegations to major powers ===
The parliament did not accept leaving their lands and sent delegations to the Ottoman Empire and the United Kingdom to gain support from both countries, arguing that they are being massacred and they would be forced into exile soon.

Ottoman and British delegations both promised recognition of an independent Circassia, as well as possible recognition from Paris, if they unified into a coherent state. The Circassians also sent a delegation to France, but no results could be achieved.

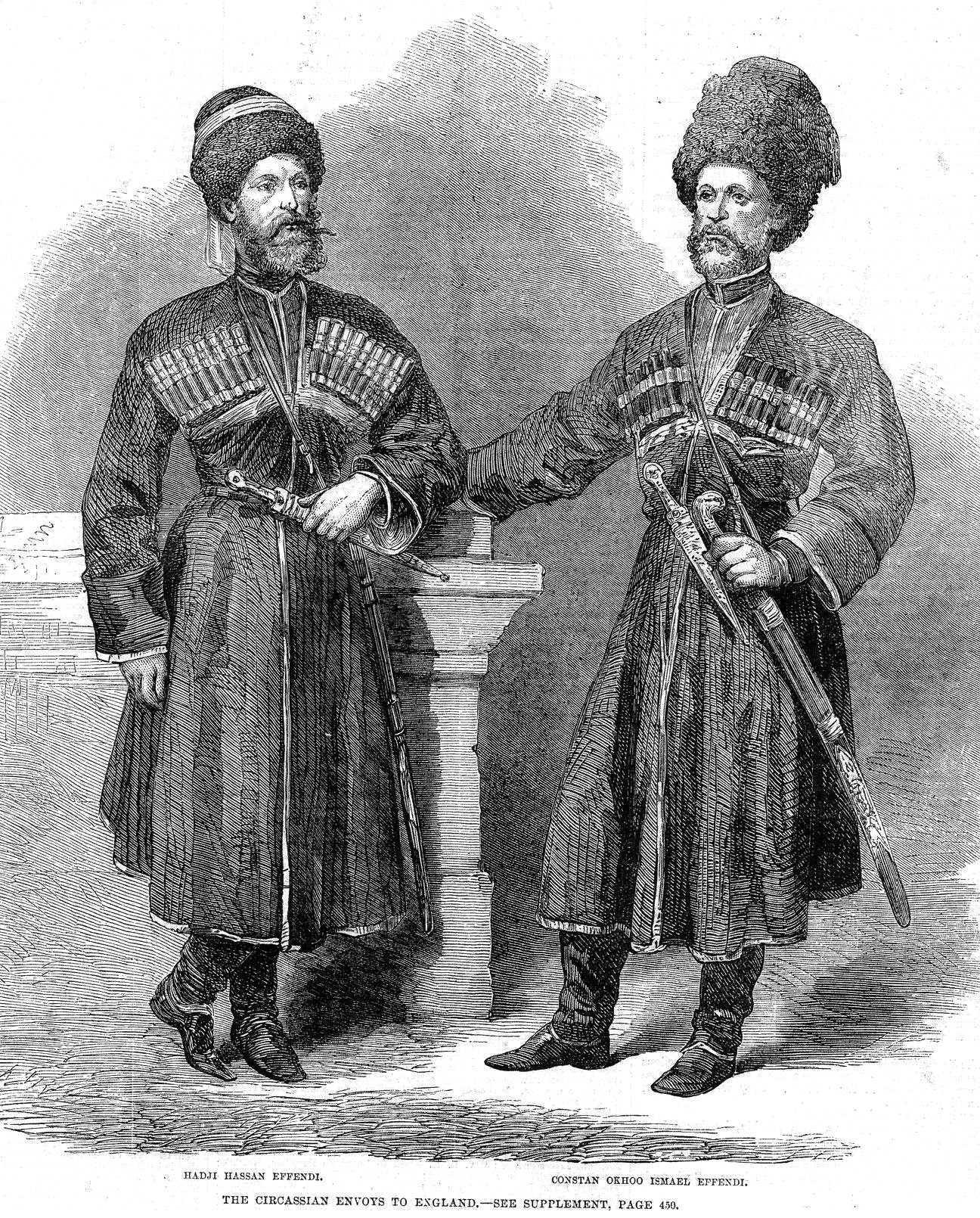
Circassian representatives Hassan Khust and Kushtaneqo Ismail

Before any result was achieved, in June 1862, as a result of the fall of Sochi, the parliament building was destroyed by the Russian forces under the command of N.P. Kolyubakin. Thus the resistance moved to the Caucasus mountains, new parliament meetings started to be held in Mutikhwa (Мутыхуа, now in the village of "Plastunki"). During this crisis, the leaders of the Circassian state appealed to the great powers for assistance. A special delegation was sent to the United Kingdom. This delegation visited major English and Scottish cities such as London, Manchester, Edinburgh, and Dundee. The visits were met with support from the British public, especially the Scots. Politicians and newspapers began to take up the "Circassian cause" and called for intervention to "save Circassia." Circassian representatives Hassan Khust Efendi and Kushtaneqo Ismail Efendi held a rally, emphasized the brotherhood between Circassia and Britain, and were given a standing ovation by the crowd. The Circassians declared their desire to join the constitutional states. In Britain, Circassian supporters organized rallies and even petitioned the Queen directly to support the Circassians. However, the British government refrained from taking initiative, fearing a direct conflict with Russia. In response to London’s inaction, the Circassian Relief Committee—organized by many who were frustrated with the government's silence—managed to raise £2,067 to provide mattresses, blankets, pillows, wool, and clothing for Circassian orphans. However, the Committee was later accused of anti-Russian sentiment and was disbanded.

=== Closure ===
After the destruction of the Parliament building by the Russian forces, the remaining members of the Parliament moved to the mountains and continued to manage the governing body. Some moved to Tophane, Istanbul. Circassians and Poles supported the Circassian Affairs Society that was opened in Istanbul. Later, some members of the Circassian Parliament joined this society. This society has received donations from the local Muslim folk, and allegedly even from the sultan himself, secretly. However, the economically and politically weakened Ottoman Empire could not contribute further in protecting the Circassians.

In 1863, the Parliament ceased its activities. In 1864, the last meeting was held in Qbaada before the parliament took its last decision, which was to not surrender, and the Battle of Qbaada was fought. The area fell, and all insurgents were later massacred by the Russian army, which announced its victory on 21 May 1864.

== See also ==
- Circassian genocide
