= House of Berzeg =

Circassian house of princely origin

House of Berzeg Барзагь
- Circassian house of princely origin
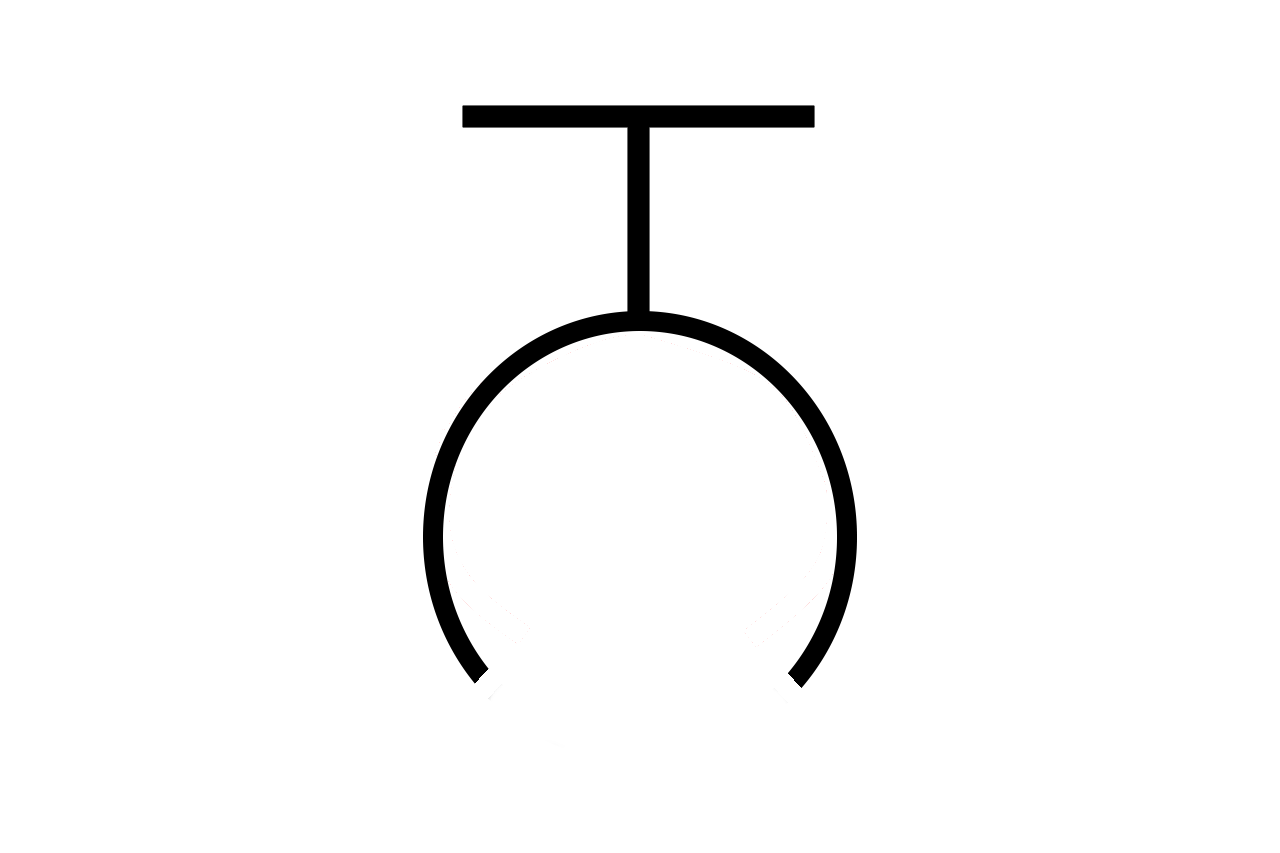
- Country: Circassia (formerly); Russian Empire (formerly); Mountainous Republic of the Northern Caucasus (formerly); Soviet Union (formerly); Russia; Turkey
- Origin: Mytykhuasua (now Plastunka), Sochi, Circassia
- Founded: Unknown
- Traditions: Khabzeism; Sunni Islam

House of Berzeg (Ubykh: Барзагь, Adyghe: Бэрзэдж, Russian: Берзег, Turkish: Berzeg Ailesi) is a Circassian princely house of Ubykhia of Circassia, who controlled the entirety of valley of the Sochi River (on its right bank, two hours from the sea) and entirety of the Mytykhuasua (now Plastunka) village of Sochi until the end of Russo-Circassian War.

== History ==
According to a story compiled by Kazim Berzeg from his family members, about 1500 years ago, a blood feud between two noble families led to the complete extinction of one and leaving only women in that family. One of these women gave birth to a boy named Berzeg, and the Berzeg clan is said to descend from him. However, there is no source to verify the accuracy of this story.

The Berzeg family was the most influential among the Ubykh. While the family is Ubykh and originated in Ubykhia, there are branches among other Circassian tribes. For example, a branch of the Berzeg clan lived among the Abzakhs. The house was a close ally and had kinship ties with the Shupako house of the Natukhajs.

In the 1830s, the Berzeg clan consisted of approximately 400 families. After the death of Saad-Girey in 1823, Ismail Berzeg was elected the leader of the House of Berzeg and the leader of Ubykhia. After 1838, Ismail Berzeg acted as a diplomat between Circassia and England. After the death of Ismail Berzeg in 1846, Gerandiqo Berzeg was elected as the leader of Ubykhia.

Members of the Berzeg clan established ties with Ottoman palace circles in Istanbul, mainly through harem connections. This allowed some of them to receive military education and attain influential positions in the Ottoman state by the mid-19th century.

Berzeg members are found in Adygea and Krasnodar Krai within Russian Federation; as well as in Republic of Turkey, due to Circassian genocide, in the present day. Unlike most Circassians, some members of House Berzeg who live in Turkey (such as Korhan Berzeg) were exempt from the Surname Law of the Republic of Turkey, which banned the use of non-Turkish surnames, possibly because some of Atatürk's aide-de-camps were Berzegs (Canbulatoglu Ekrem Berzeg and Dogomuqo Omer Bey).

Korhan Berzeg was an economist and academic. After serving as an economics professor at Istanbul Technical University, he became the World Bank's Asia Director in the US and later retired. He was also the university professor of Treasury and Finance Minister Mehmet Şimşek. Kazım Berzeg was an intellectual and lawyer and, by founding the Liberal Thought Association in 1992, he played a leading role in promoting liberal ideas in Turkey.

== Notable members ==
- Ismail Berzeg (1763–1846)
- Gerandiqo Berzeg (1804–1881)
- Alkhazuqo Beyislam Berzeg
- Alimgirey Babuk Berzeg
- Elbuzbek Hapakh Berzeg
- Canbulatoglu Ekrem Berzeg (1887–1919)
- Sefer Berzeg (1892-1920)
- Dogomuqo Omer Bey
- Kazim Berzeg (1938–2016)
- Korhan Berzeg (1940–2023)
- Nihat Fuat Berzeg (1953–)

== Images ==
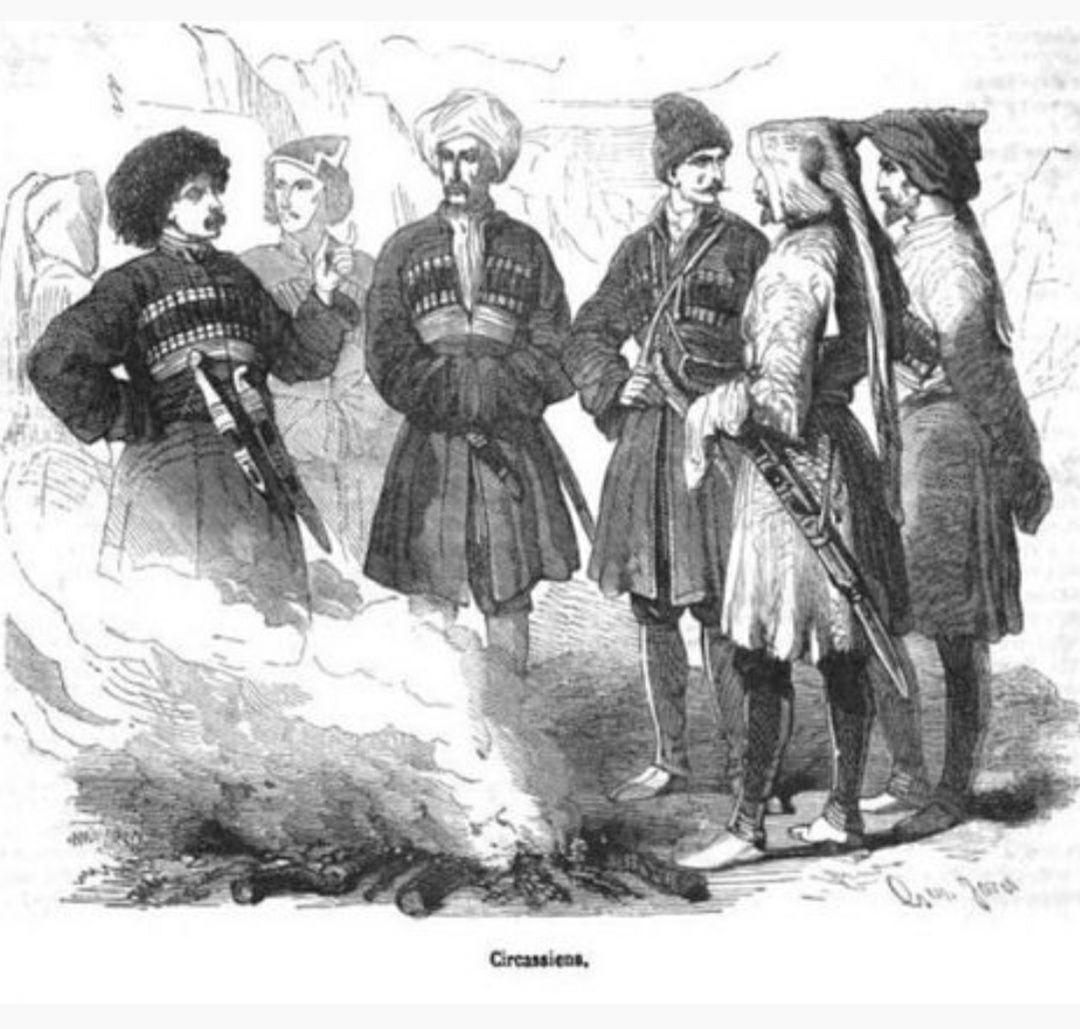
Ismail Berzeg and with his friends, 1840's.

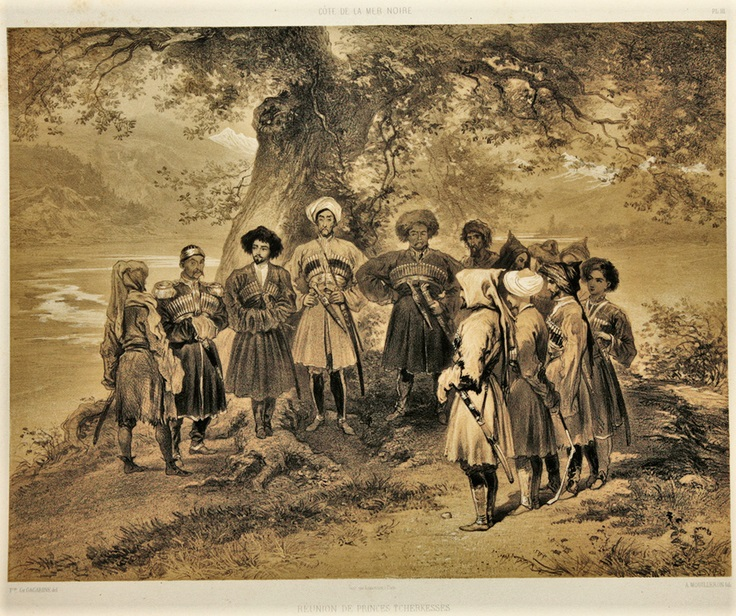
Ismail Berzeg and Circassian princes, 1847.

Gerandiqo Berzeg, 1880s.
