= Gerandiqo Berzeg =

Circassian military commander and chief

Hajji Thamade Gerandiqo Berzeg
- Гьарандыхъва Барзагь; Джэрандыкъо Бэрзэдж
- Gerandiqo Berzeg in exile

Confederate Leader of Circassia
- Preceded by: Seferbiy Zaneqo
- Succeeded by: Office abolished

Princely Leader of the Ubykh
- In office 1846–1864
- Preceded by: Ismail Berzeg
- Succeeded by: Office abolished

Leader of the Circassian Majlis
- In office 25 June 1860 (N.S) – 5 June 1864 (N.S)
- Preceded by: Office established
- Succeeded by: Office abolished

Personal details
- Born: 1802 Mytykhuasua, Ş̂açə, Circassia
- Died: 1880 (aged 77–78) Yeniköy, Balıkesir, Ottoman Empire
- Relations: Associate of Sultan Abdulaziz
- Children: İslam Bey, Tevfik Bey, two unnamed children dead in battle
- Parent: Hatajuq Berzeg (father)
- Awards: Order of Osmaniye
- Nickname: Ubykh Shamil

Military service
- Allegiance: Circassian Confederation; Ubykh Principality; Ottoman Empire
- Years of service: 1841–1880
- Battles/wars: Russo-Circassian War; Crimean War; Russo-Turkish War (1877–1878)

Hajji Gerandiqo Berzeg (Adyghe: Джэрандыкъо Бэрзэдж, romanized: Dɉərandıqo Bərzədɉ; Ubykh: Гьарандыхъва Барзагь, romanized: Giarandıxua Barzagi; Turkish: Hacı Giranduk Berzeg) was a Circassian military commander who served as the leader of the Circassian Confederation from 1860 to 1864. Most of his life, including his late childhood, was spent in the Russo-Circassian War (1763-1864) fronts. He reportedly met his own son in the battlefield, where he lost two of his other sons. After the Circassian genocide, he was exiled to the Ottoman Empire, volunteered in the Ottoman army against Russia, and died there of old age.

== Biography ==
=== Early life ===
Not much is recorded about Berzeg's early life, as Circassians did not write down their history, and all knowledge comes from Russian sources. Gerandiqo Berzeg was born in the Mytykhuasua village of Ş̂açə (Sochi). He is member of House of Berzeg and his is father was Hatajuq Berzeg, and his uncle was Ismail Berzeg, the prince of Ubykhia. He spent his youth in Russo-Circassian War fronts. Being a pious Muslim, he went to Mecca for hajj in 1839.

=== Military career ===
After returning from hajj, he joined the war again. His first big military success was in Sukhumi, 1841, when he freed the Sadz region from Russian occupation. In 1846, with the death of Ismail Berzeg, he was elected as the prince of Ubykhia. In 1857, he unified his forces with Ishamil Zayush and attacked the Russian forces in Gagra. His biggest campaign was in 1854 when he set out to re-capture areas and forts invaded by the Russian army, and vastly succeeded.

In 1860, when he was 60 years old, he helped unite Circassia and was elected the president of the Independence Majlis of Circassia (Adyghe: Шъхьафитныгъэ Хасэ, romanized: Şhafitnığə Xasə).

=== Life in exile and death ===
After the defeat in 1864, he could not decide whether to accept defeat or fight one last battle and die. He went to meet with Mikhail Chacba, prince of Abkhazia to ask for advice. When he was absent, his army of 3 thousand were attacked by the Russian army, and caught without a leader, were completely destroyed. After this, to avoid further bloodshed, Berzeg decided to admit defeat. On March 24, 1864, Berzeg declared full surrender on behalf of the Circassian people and was exiled to Ottoman territory.

After the Circassian genocide, he was personally invited by Sultan Abdulaziz of the Ottoman Empire and honored. He was offered a noble house in Istanbul but he formally rejected this offer and moved to a small village in Manyas instead. During the Russo-Turkish war of 1877-1878, he assembled an army of Circassians and returned to fight against the Russians once again. He died in 1881.

== Legacy ==
Hajji Berzeg is respected by Circassians worldwide as national hero.

=== Mausoleum ===
In late 2021, Circassian activists started a campaign to have his grave restored in a manner that suits a leader and started fundraising. In March 2022, the Turkish government decided to investigate, and later announced that "the grave will be restored in a way that suits the commander, who has shown an example of great valor."

The construction was completed in June 2022, and was opened with a ceremony. Deputy Yavuz Subaşı, who attended the ceremony, said in his speech that "Berzeg is not only a Circassian leader, but also a very important Ottoman commander. Circassians must preserve their language and religion."

In his last will, Hajji Berzeg stated that he wanted at least a piece of his body to be buried in his homeland. To connect Berzeg with his homeland in accordance with his last will, during the ceremony, soil brought from the Circassian homeland by Asım Berzeg, the grandson of Hajji Berzeg, was sprinkled on the grave. Although it was deemed not permissible to open the grave and remove parts of it Islamically, at least some soil taken from the Tepecik Neighborhood, where the grave is located, was taken to the lands where Berzeg was born, to symbolically fulfill his last wish.
