= Ferah Ali Pasha =

Ottoman military leader (died 1785)

Pasha Ferah Ali Pasha
- Ferah Ali Paşa

Ottoman ambassador to Circassia
- In office 1779–1785
- Appointed by: Abdul Hamid I
- Succeeded by: Sefer Bey Zanuqo

Governor of Anapa fortress
- In office 1781–1785
- Appointed by: Abdul Hamid I

Personal details
- Died: 1785 Circassia

Military service
- Allegiance: Ottoman Empire

Ferah Ali Pasha (Ottoman Turkish: فراه آلى پاشا; Adyghe: Фэрахь-Али Пащэ; died 1785) was an Ottoman pasha sent to Circassia in order to maintain diplomatic relations between Circassia and the Ottoman Empire and spread Islam among the remaining Christian and Pagan tribes in Circassia.

== Biography ==
In 1779 he was appointed to the Black Sea coast of Circassia and built several forts and mosques. He was a devshirme of Georgian origin and was famous as a pious Muslim person. His life can be studied from the notes of Haşim Efendi and the History of Cevdet Pasha. Ferah Ali Pasha, who visited the region after settling in Soğucak, said in the letter he sent to Istanbul: "The people of this region are brave and honest people. If fortifications are made in the region, it will become a country like Crimea, it will put a strong barrier against the enemy."

Ferah Ali Pasha died in 1785.
