= Rulers of Circassia =

The Rulers of Circassia refers to the figures who held supreme authority over Circassia. This role evolved from a symbolic feudal title into a formal executive office established to coordinate national defense during the Russo-Circassian War.

== History ==
=== Pre-Inalid princes ===
The influential tribes of Circassia regularly met to elect a Grand Prince (Пщышхо) among them. The existence of such an institute is confirmed by foreign sources. In the eyes of foreign observers, the Grand Prince was considered the king of the Circassians. However, the individual tribes were greatly autonomous and the title was mostly symbolic. In 1237, the Dominican monks Richard and Julian, as part of the Hungarian embassy, visited Circassia and the main city of this country Matrega, located on the Taman Peninsula. In Matrega, the embassy received a good reception from the Grand Prince.

In the 14th and 15th centuries Italian documents concerning the relationship between the consul of Kafa and Circassia clearly indicate the absolutely special status of the ruler of Circassia. This status allowed the senior prince of Circassia to correspond with the Pope. The letter of Pope John XXII, addressed to the Grand Prince Verzacht of Zichia (Circassia), dates back to 1333, in which the Roman pontiff thanked the ruler for his diligence in introducing the Catholic faith among his subjects. Verzacht's power status was so high that following his example some other Circassian princes adopted Catholicism.

==== List ====
Name	Circassian name	Reign	Description
Rededya	Ридадэ	?–1022	Prince of Kassogia, leader of Circassians who fought Mstislav the Brave
Tuqar	Tукъар	?–1237	Leader of Circassians who died fighting the Mongols
Tuqbash	Tукъбаш	1237–1239	Leader of Circassians who died fighting the Mongols

=== Inalid Prince of Princes ===
Grand Princes of the Principality of Chemguy were considered as the "true owners" of most of West Circassia. This is because in Circassian oral history, Inal the Blind managed to unite all Circassians and declared himself the "Princes of Princes", and the title has passed to Inal's eldest son Chemrug. Chemrug's son Boletuqo founded the House of Boletuqo, which was the princely dynasty of the Principality of Chemguy. In some versions, Boletuqo's brothers, along with their subjects, broke away from the principality and formed their own principalities. This separation process resulted in the formation of the Hatuqay, Jane, and Hegayk tribes. The Chemguy Grand Prince held a nominal vassal authority over all the principalities believed to be descended from the Inal; including Kabardians and Besleney.

In the first half of the 16th century, the Bzhedug people migrated from the Black Sea coast to settle in the Chemguy lands in the Kuban region. According to legend, the Chemguy prince agreed to allow the Bzhedug people to settle in his lands on the condition that the Bzhedug princes become his vassal nobles. The Bzhedug princes wanted to preserve their princely rank and independence. The Bzhedug won the ensuing war and acquired vast territories around the Psekups basin. Makhosh tribe, who broke away from the Bzhedug tribe, also went east and settled in the Chemguy lands. In the late 16th century, the Abzakh and Shapsug-Natukhaj tribes appeared, in that order, in central West Circassia and along the Black Sea coast.

According to historian F. A. Shcherbina, during the Russo-Circassian War, when General Zass suggested defining borders with the Principality of Chemguy, Grand Prince Jembulat Boletuqo replied:

"What has this Russian general, born of a woman without trousers, devised? What border could I have? I am a son of the sun and the moon, meaning I descend from parental blood so pure that my parents can only be likened to the sun and the moon, and my ancestors' domains stretched along the Kuban, from the Laba River to the Black Sea. There is but one border for these lands: the Kuban. On one side are my lands, on the other are the Russians. Everyone should know this."

By the early 19th century, the confederative structure of the Principality of Chemguy included the territories of Makhosh, Yejeruqay, Ademiy and Mamkhegh. They had previously established dominance over the Abazin regions as well.

==== List ====
Name	Circassian name	Reign	Description
Inal "the Blind"	Хъурышъолъей икъо Инал "Нэшъу"	See Dating of Inal	Ancestor of Circassian princes in tradition.
Chemrug	Инал икъо Кӏэмрыгу	Early 14th c.	Eldest son of Inal in tradition. He gave his name to the principality (the land of Chemrug, Chemrugoy, Chemirgoy, Chemguy).
Boletuqo	Кӏэмрыгу икъо Болэтыкъо	Early 14th c.	Eldest son of Chemrug in tradition. He was the founder of the dynasty. Dated to the early 14th century by Samir Khotko.
Chertibiy (Kerti Bey / Kurtibay)	Болэтыкъо Чэртыбий	Before 1452	Father of Biberd, Ashaba and Tokhtamish. In the anonymous Arabic chronicle titled 'al-‘Uqūd al-Jawhariyya fī al-Mahāsin al-Dawla al-Ashrafiyya al-Ghawiyya', Kurtibay, the ruler of Karamuk (namely Chemguy), and Kerti Bey, the ruler of Kremuk mentioned by Josaphat Barbaro, are the same person. This ruler had sons named Biberd, mentioned by Barbaro, and Tokhtamish (Taktamysh) and Ashaba (Ishbai), mentioned by the Arabic chronicle.
Biberd	Болэтыкъо Чэртыбий икъо Биберд	c. 1452	Son of Chertibiy. Mentioned by Giosafat Barbaro, a representative of a Venetian noble family in Tana, as the ruler of Chemguy (Kremuk) in 1452. He was also mentioned in a Genoese document from 1471.
Tomenish	Болэтыкъо Томэныш	Early 16th c.	Mentioned in oral sources as the ruler of Chemguy and killed during the battle against Bzhedugs. The place where Tomenish died severely wounded was turned into a mound by the Bzhedugs after the battle. This mound is called the Tomenish mound (Томанышы иIуашъхь). In some versions; Bzhedugs had allied with the fugitive relatives of the Crimean Khan, Tomenish was also recorded as Bezruqo and fought alongside Hatuqay prince Aledjuqo during the battle.
Qanshau (Kansu)	Болэтыкъо Къаншъау	c. 1581	Mentioned in Ottoman documents in 1581 as the Christian ruler of Chemguy (Kemürgüy). The name Kansu in Ottoman documents may be Qanshau. Circassian folk songs about the 1578 Derbent campaign during the Ottoman-Safavid War of 1578–1590 instead name Asran (Болэтыкъо Асран).
Qanshauqo (Kanşuk / Kansutrak)	Болэтыкъо Къаншъау икъо	c. 1583	Mentioned in Ottoman documents from 1583 as the ruler of Chemguy. He was mentioned among the Circassian princes with their detachments who were part of the Ottoman expeditionary force. He is mentioned as Kansutrak in another document. A document from 1586 mentions two Chemguy princes named Subuh and Survez.
Mehmed	Болэтыкъо Мыхьэмэд	Until 1590	Mehmed was the ruler of Chemguy until he was appointed by Ottomans as the Sanjak-bey of Kefe and the Emir of the Circassian lands in 1590. Mehmed and his brother Husrev had converted to Islam.
Husrev	Болэтыкъо Хьусрэу	c. 1590	After his older brother Mehmed was appointed as Emir, Husrev was appointed as the ruler of Chemguy after Mehmed.
Unnamed ruler		c. 1629	Mentioned by Dominican friar Giovanni Luca in 1629 as the ruler of Chemguy (Bolette-koy). He welcomed the missionaries sent by Pope Urban VIII, hosting them in his residence and facilitating the mass baptism of 250 children in his domain. He was around 60 years old in 1629 and had sons and at least a daughter. His wife had recently died.
Mirzabek	Болэтыкъо Мырзэбек	c. 1643	Mentioned by Russians in 1643 as the ruler of Chemguy (Kumurgey), son of Qanmirza and older brother of Bezruqo which was sent to Terek city as a delegate.
Sihatuqo (Sihadok)	Болэтыкъо Сыхьатыкъо	c. 1666	Mentioned by Evliya Çelebi in 1666 as the eldest brother among the 7 ruling prince brothers of Chemguy (Bolatkay). He listed 5 brothers from eldest to youngest as: Sihatuqo (Sihadok), Yelbezdi (El-Bozdı), Yelmirza (El-mirza), Bezruqo (Bazruk), Bateqo (Batok).
Unnamed ruler		c. 1724	Mentioned by Xavier de Glavany in his 1724 report as the ruler of Chemguy (Gemirgia) and Makhosh (Mokosigilan). According to Glavany, the principality had 2,000 dwellings under his administration, and the Abazin tribe Barakay (Karabay) with 600 dwellings was also listed as his dependency.
Shumaf	Болэтыкъо Айтэч икъо Шумафэ	Mid 18th c.	Son of Aytech. Mentioned in traditional songs and legends. He had 2 sons named Aslanbech and Hatughuzhuqo.
Aslanbech	Болэтыкъо Шумафэ икъо Аслъэнбэч	c. 1782	Son of Shumaf. Mentioned in 1782 as the ruler of Chemguy, who signed his letter to the commandant of Suzhuq-Kale, reporting on frontier conditions and requesting military support from the Ottoman authorities. Later that, he is mentioned in 1789, 1790, 1791, 1792 and 1797.
Bezruqo	Болэтыкъо Хьатыгъужъыкъо икъо Бэзрыкъо	Until 1808	Son of Hatughuzhuqo. He was killed during a battle against the Abzakhs.
Mishawost	Болэтыкъо Хьатыгъужъыкъо икъо Мышъэост	1808–1827	Son of Hatughuzhuqo, older brother of Bezruqo.
Jembulat	Болэтыкъо Хьатыгъужъыкъо икъо Джанболэт	1827–1836/1837	Son of Hatughuzhuqo. He opposed Russia and was killed by Russian general Grigory Zass in an assassination.

=== De-facto Confederation Leaders ===
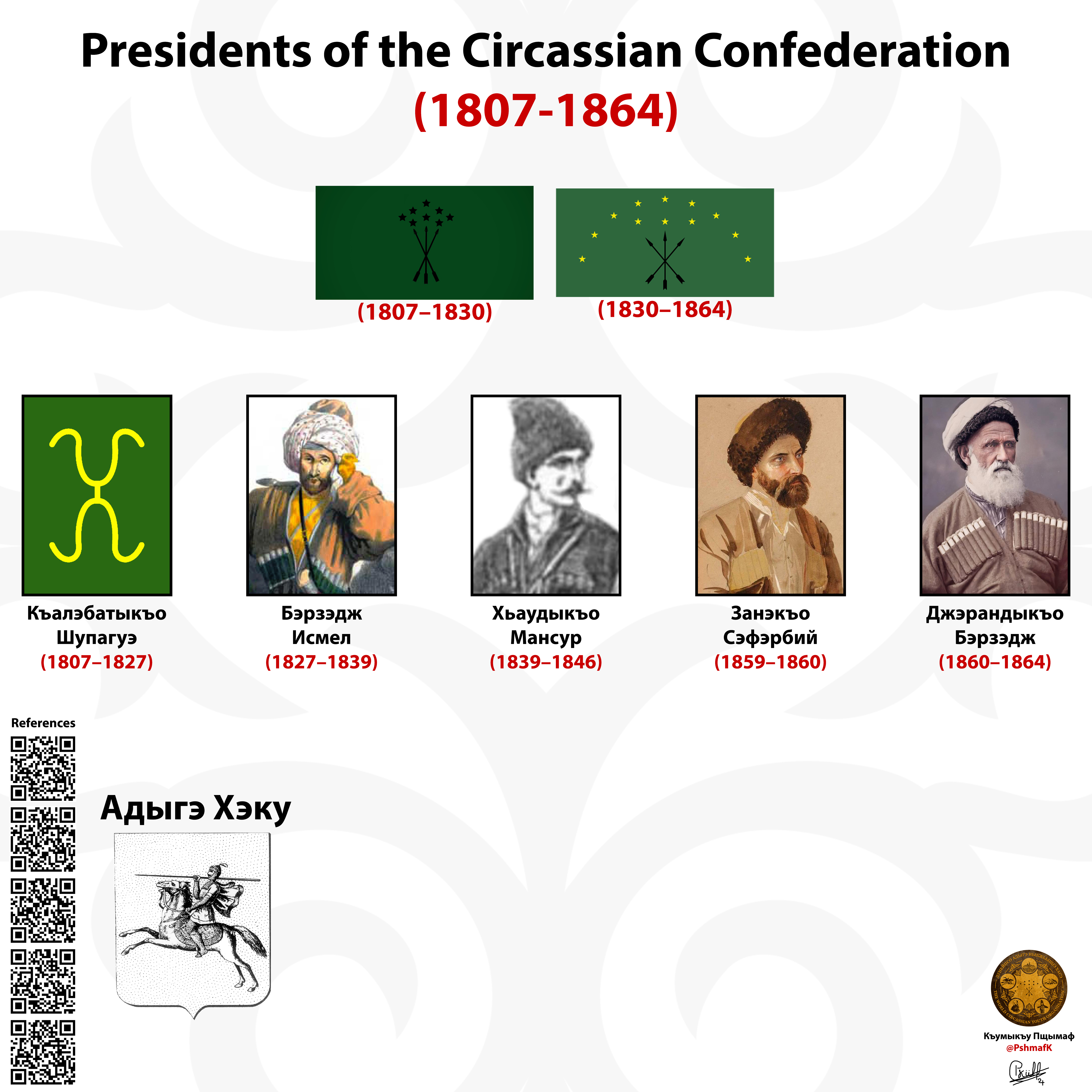
Presidents of the Circassian Confederation

Circassia traditionally consisted of more than a dozen principalities. Some of these principalities were divided into large feudal estates, characterized by the stability of political status. Within these territories there were numerous feudal possessions of princes (pshi). The Circassian state was a federal state consisting of four levels of government: Village council (чылэ хасэ, made up of village elders and nobles), district council (made up of representatives from 7 neighbouring village councils), regional council (шъолъыр хасэ, made up from neighbouring district councils), people's council (лъэпкъ зэфэс, where every council had a representative). A central government emerged during the mid to late 1800s. Prior to that, the institute of grand prince was mostly symbolic. The confederation of free tribes emerged as rival power structure to the princes.

In 1807, Qalebatuqo Hatuqay Shupako self-proclaimed himself as the leader of the Circassian confederation, and divided Circassia into 12 major regions. In 1827, Ismail Berzeg officially declared the military confederation of the Circassian tribes and by 1839 united a significant part of Circassia under his control. In 1839, the Circassians declared Bighurqal (Anapa) as their new capital and Hawduqo Mansur was declared the new leader of the Circassian Confederation. He kept this title until his death. In 1848, Muhammad Amin was the leader of Circassia. After learning that a warriorly scholar has arrived, thousands of families moved to the Abdzakh region to accept his rule. Seferbiy Zaneqo assumed power after Amin's departure, but died the next year.

In June 1860, at a congress of representatives of Circassians, a parliament was formed as the highest legislative body of Circassia. Being a political resistance council and the legislature of Circassia, the parliament was established in the capital of Sochi (Adyghe: Шъачэ, romanized: Ş̂açə) on June 13, 1860, and Gerandiqo Berzeg was elected as the head of the parliament and the nation.

==== List ====
Portrait	Name	Circassian name	Term of office	Tribe of origin	Profession	Notes
	Sheikh Mansur	Шыихъ Мансур	1787–1791	Ethnic Chechen	Military commander, Islamic preacher	Managed to gain the loyalty of most Circassians, uniting them in the name of Islam. Considered a hero in Circassian folklore despite being of Chechen origin. Was recognized by the Ottoman Caliph as the leader of all Caucasian Muslims.
	Shupako Hatuqay Qalebatuqo	Къалэбатыкъо Хьатыкъуай Шупаго	1807–1827	Natukhaj	Soldier, nobleman, politician	A member of the House of Shupako. He held possession of Gelendzhik. In 1807, having acquired some wealth and power, he attempted to unite Circassians under a "national oath" and declared himself the leader of the Circassian confederation and divided Circassia into 12 major regions. But his authority was mostly limited, though British adventurer in Circassia, James Bell, said he was "admired".
	Ismail Berzeg	Бэрзэдж Дэгумыкъо Исмахьил	1827–1839	Ubykh	Military commander, nobleman, politician	A member of the House of Berzeg. From 1827, he engaged in organizing a military confederation of the tribes living on the Black Sea coast. By the end of 1839, he had united most of the population and other Circassians accepted his authority. James Bell called him "Circassian Washington".
	Hawduqo Mansur	Хьаудыкъо Мансур Шупаго	1839–1846	Natukhaj	Military commander, nobleman, politician	A member of the House of Shupako. On May 6, 1837, he presided over the All-Circassian tribal assembly, which was attended by 1,000 Circassian representatives, as well as British adventurers James Bell and John Augustus Longworth. In December 1838, he was also elected as the leader of the assembly held by the Shapsugs and Natukhais. He rose to the position of a leader of the Circassians. After this date, in Circassian meetings mentioned in Russian sources, Mansur was referred to as the leader. Longworth mentioned Mansur's popularity, Longworth states that the Circassians loved him enough to make him "king of the country." He also mentions that Mansur spoke Turkish very well.
	Muhammad Amin	Наиб Мыхьэмэд Амин	1848–September 1859	Ethnic Avar	Islamic preacher	Appointed by Imam Shamil to lead the Circassians, his title was "Naib" (representative). Amin used harsh methods to impose his rule, and many Circassians recognized his authority willingly or unwillingly. His era was marked with various reforms in industry, diplomacy, military, administration, religious issues and more. He gradually established stricter Islamic laws, removed slavery, banned social classes, built schools and small factories. He was recognized by the Ottoman Caliph as the Governor of Circassia.
	Seferbiy Zaneqo	Занэкъо Сэфэрбий	September 1859–1 January 1860	Natukhaj	Diplomat, Military commander, nobleman, politician	Designer of the Circassian flag. An Ottoman and Russian citizen, Zaneqo mostly worked as a diplomat of Circassia, acting as an intermediary between Circassians and Ottomans, Russians, and British. Was elected by Circassians as representative of Circassia. Initially recognized as the envoy of Circassia to Ottomans by Mahmud II, he later acquired the title Governor of Circassia. However, he could not establish authority due to the naibate of Muhammad Amin, and a civil war between the two ensued. Amin lost the war, however Zaneqo passed soon after.
	Gerandiqo Berzeg	Бэрзэдж Дэгумыкъо Джэрандыкъо	13 June 1860 – 21 May 1864	Ubykh	Military commander, nobleman, politician	A member of the House of Berzeg. In 1861, the Parliament of Independence was established in Sochi, declaring Circassia as a unitary state. Gerandiqo Berzeg was elected as the chairman and continued this role until the annexation of Circassia.
