= Seferbiy Zaneqo =

Circassian diplomat (1798–1860)

Sefir (Ambassador) Mirmiran Thamade Sefer Bey Zaneqo Pasha
- Занэкъо Сэфэрбий (Adyghe)
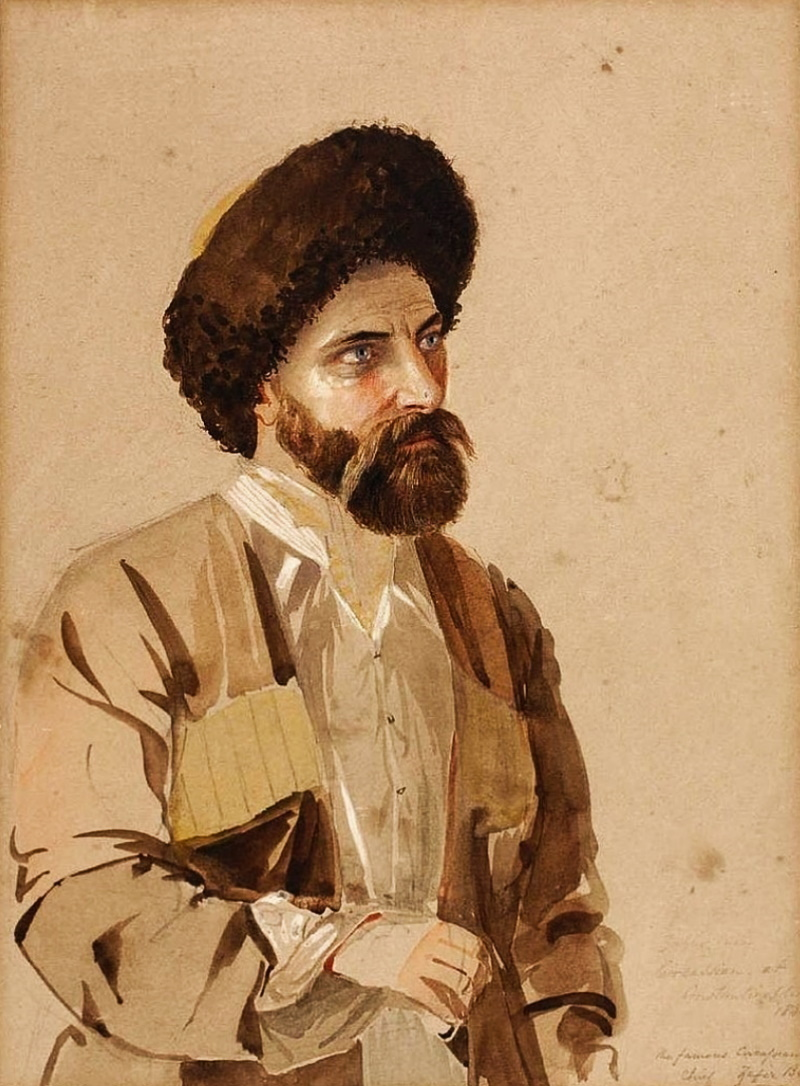
- Zaneqo in daily wear, 1845

Confederate Leader of Circassia
- In office 1859–1860
- Preceded by: Muhammad Amin
- Succeeded by: Qerandiqo Berzeg

Ottoman ambassador to Circassia
- In office 1829–1860
- Appointed by: Abdulmejid I
- Preceded by: Ferah Ali Pasha

De facto Circassian ambassador to the Ottomans
- In office 1831–1860
- Appointed by: Himself

De facto Circassian ambassador to Britain
- In office 1831–1860
- Appointed by: Himself

Personal details
- Born: 1798 Anapa, Circassia
- Died: 1 January 1860 (aged 61–62) Shapsug province, Circassia
- Resting place: Vordobgach valley
- Children: Karabatir Zaneqo

Military service
- Allegiance: Circassian Confederation; Shapsugia; Ottoman Empire
- Battles/wars: Russo-Circassian War; Muhammad Ali's seizure of power Russo-Turkish War (1828–1829); Crimean War

Seferbiy Zaneqo (Note: Adyghe: Занэкъо Сэфэрбий, romanized: Zaneqo Seferbii; Ottoman Turkish: ظنزادە صفر بك; Turkish: Zanzade Sefer Bek) (1798 – 1 January 1860), or Sefer Pasha, was a Circassian diplomat and military commander who served as the leader of the Circassian Confederation from 1859 to 1860. He took part in the Russo-Circassian War both in a military and a political capacity. Advocating for the Circassian cause in the west and acting as an emissary of the Ottoman Empire in the region. By the end of his life Zaneqo had emerged as the leader of the Circassian resistance.

== Early life ==
Sefer Bey Zaneqo was born near Anapa. He descended from the Circassian noble family of Zan. His tribal affiliation is disputed, his ancestors are variously believed to be Khegayks or Natukhajs. His father Mehmed Giray Bey, a business owner and one of the richest men in Circassia, died when he was young.

In 1807, the fortress of Anapa was captured by Russian troops during the course of the Russo-Circassian War and Zaneqo was given as a hostage to the Russians by the local population. He was then sent to Odessa, where he was educated in the Rishelevski Lyceum. His service in the Russian army ended abruptly when he fled to the mountains after a personal conflict with his regiment's commander. According to British adventurer James Stanislaus Bell, he soon sailed to Egypt where he lived among the Circassian Mamluks until their fall from power. Whereupon he returned to his homeland and married a Nogai princess.

At that time Anapa had been conquered by the Ottoman Empire, prompting Zaneqo to travel to Constantinople where he entered into Ottoman service. He became the deputy of Anapa governor Hajji Hassan Pasha, receiving the rank of colonel. During the Russo-Turkish War (1828–1829), Anapa was recaptured by the Russians and Zaneqo was taken prisoner. He remained in Odessa until the end of the war, and once freed he returned to Circassia, taking the role of an ambassador.

== Beginnings ==
The young Sefer Bey was sent to study at the Richelieu Lyceum in Odessa. There, he learned to speak, read, and write in Russian, and was assigned as a cadet at the Russian 22nd Jaeger Regiment, stationed in Anapa. After quarreling with the regiment commander, A.Ya. Rudzevich, Sefer Bey fled to the mountains, and then discreetly sailed for Turkey.

== Back home ==
After arriving in Istanbul, Sefer Bey was able to quickly ascend to a position of influence due to his astute character. Eventually, Sefer decided to return to Circassia, he was able to fill the position of being the assistant to the Ottoman pasha at Anapa. Sefer Bey won authority among the Natukhaj princes and other Circassians often acting as an intermediary between the Ottomans and Natukhaj. Sefer Bey reached the rank of Colonel in the Turkish army during the summer of 1828, when the Russian army sieged the fort of Anapa. Osman Pasha, the Turkish commander of Anapa, had decided to surrender the fort, and Sefer Bey himself led the negotiations to avoid potential bloodshed. Sefer Bey's former comrade Lieutenant-Commander and fellow Graduate of the Richelieu Lyceum L.M.Serebryakov was on the opposing side of the negotiations on behalf of the Russians and would later recall that this deal was not possible without Sefer Bey's involvement. The British adventurer James Bell would later write that if Sefer bey had decided not to surrender, opposing Osman Pasha's decision, then the garrison would have followed his example and could not have been taken by the Russian army easily.

== Great Britain ==
In early January 1831, Sefer Bey organized several general meetings with the elders of the Shapsughs and Natukhajs on the Ahops, Sukko and Adagum rivers. Among other things, he put forward the idea of a possible reconciliation between the Circassians and Russia, on the stipulation that the Russians retreated behind the Kuban, however, this proposal was rejected. Negotiations with the Ottomans on the other hand were largely unsuccessful due to tightly bound terms of the Adrianople peace treaty of 1829. During the same year, the Russian ambassador sent a letter back home reporting that Sefer Bey with the authority of 200 various Circassian princes and elders, negotiated a possible British alliance with the ambassador John Posonby. Undeterred, Sefer Bey continued the negotiations with the British, eventually organizing a trip to Circassia for the British diplomat David Urquhart. David would inspire the Circassians further in their resistance, by promising the help of Great Britain.

== In the British embassy ==
Sefer Bey received an invitation to the British embassy in Istanbul, where other Circassian deputies were invited as well. Upon arrival he reassured his countrymen that his current exile was only temporary and only to deceive the Russian authorities. He proposed a strategy for the deputies, suggesting that leaders with influence over the populace should relocate with their subjects to the bay of Tsemez. Where Sefer Bey would return to with a full British expedition. The news was carried by the deputies back home to Circassia, and as a result the Shapsughs and Natukhajs held a council which elected Mohammed-Kass and Kushtanoko-Khashesh as deputies with full consent. With this new strengthened position which had been negotiated at the British Embassy in Istanbul, the British also took advantage of the situation. British ships in the following period frequented the shores of Circassia, not only carrying agents and diplomats but also cargo filled with provisions and more importantly, gunpowder.

== Vixen Affair ==
The Russians were forced again to take increased measures in order to weaken the Circassian war effort, and as a result Baron Grigory Rosen, commander of the Separate Caucasian Corps, ordered an increase in the supervision of the Circassian coastline. Eventually, a year later, the Russians were able to capture a British vessel. In November 1836, the Russian Ajax brig detained the British schooner Vixen in the Bay of Tsemez under the control of James Bell and his brother George, which was unloading 100 tons of gunpowder ashore. This incident led to a rapid deterioration of British-Russian relations and almost led to an armed conflict, but by April 1837 the situation had normalized, and David Urquhart was recalled from Istanbul. This whole episode was dubbed "The Vixen Affair". In 1837 D. Bell arrived again in Circassia, accompanied by the English journalist John Longworth and Sefer Bey's envoy Naghwa Ishmael, who handed letters to the Circassians on behalf of Sefer Bey and the British government. Until 1839, the British D. Bell and D. Longworth were in Circassia, organizing the delivery of military supplies for the Circassians accompanying them in raids beyond the Russian lines, and coordinating their actions. Due to increased militancy and effective diplomacy between Zhanonqo and the British, the Russians changed their strategy into a prioritized control of the Black Sea through building multiple forts in an attempt to minimize the aid received by Circassians. This coupled with the increased bureaucratic obstacles that Zhanonko had faced trying to get further involvement from the Ottomans, led him to send a letter to the leaders of the Circassian resistance explaining that nothing could be done so far under the existing agreements between Russia and Ottomans. On the other hand, he urged them not to lose hope. Few Circassian leaders decided to cease resistance, however the vast majority decided to continue the struggle, sending a clear message that the Circassians were not going to accept Russian citizenship under any circumstances.

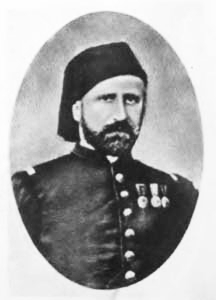
Seferbiy Zaneqo

== Ambassador in the Ottoman Empire ==
The Treaty of Adrianople (1829) marked the beginning of the Russian colonization of Circassia through the establishment of military outposts and stanitsas. An assembly of Circassian tribes declared Zaneqo as their representative, dispatching him to Constantinople at the head of 200 man delegation in the spring of 1831. The Ottoman agreed to secretly supply the Circassians with weapons and ammunition, while Muhammad Ali of Egypt refused to provide any assistance. Zaneqo settled in Samsun where he continued his advocacy. There he met David Urquhart, one of the first people to espouse the Circassian cause in the west and a major contributor to the rise of Rusophobic attitudes in British society. In the summer of 1834, Urquhart visited Circassia where he received a petition signed by 11 chiefs requesting the British king to intervene into the conflict. Two more petitions followed in 1835 and 1836 respectively, both were reluctantly rejected by the British ambassador in Constantinople John Ponsonby, 1st Viscount Ponsonby. Lord Palmerston had previously blocked Ponsonby's initiative to include Circassia in the Eastern Question, on account of the feeble state of the Circassian resistance movement. In the summer of 1836, Sefer Bey met directly with Sultan Mahmud II, during an archery competition held at Okmeydanı, who was impressed by his noble demeanor. Moved by the Circassian struggle, the Sultan presented Sefer Bey with a snuffbox adorned with precious stones which was a gift typically reserved for foreign envoys.

A series of diplomatic protests by the Russian ambassador led to Zaneqo's exile to Edirne. Encouraged by Urquhart a group of British adventurers unsuccessfully attempted to run the blockade of the Circassian coast, the Mission of the Vixen created a diplomatic scandal between Britain and Russia. Encouraged by Ponsonby, Zaneqo continued to submit appeals to the British albeit to no avail. In the meantime, the militant Sufi Khalidiyya movement influenced parts of the resistance over the Adyghe Khabze as the leading ideology. Envoys sent by Imam Shamil helped coordinate the activities of the insurgents across the Caucasus and established Sharia law.

== Pressures ==
The pressure on the Russian forces became crucial. In 1842, relying on his influence in Circassia, Sefer demanded from the Russian embassy in Turkey to return to his homeland. The correspondence started between the embassy and the Russian generals in the Circassian front and deliberation with Sefer continued for nearly a decade. Unexpectedly, General Serebryakov supported Sefer's demand and requested form the commander-in-chief and viceroy of the Caucasus Prince Mikhail Simonovich Forintsov to approve it. His opinion was to use Sefer's influence to convince Circassians to surrender. In 1844 Sefer sent a letter to the Shapsugh and Natukhaj that the Ottomans will cease to support Circassians in light of Turkish Russian relationships. He encouraged them not to lose hope nor fall under Russian promises, and never to move to the northern bank of Kuban River. With this news, few Circassians preferred to surrender and Sefer attempts to return to the homeland continued to fail. With Sefer's absence, the spirit of unity among the Circassians started to fade. In 1853 Russian ambassador in Turkey received a note that Sefer is communicating with Circassian leaders to provoke them to unite against Russia. The peace project with Sefer was terminated.

== Treaty of Paris ==
According to the terms of the Paris Peace Treaty (March 30, 1856), all Circassia was transferred to the rule of Russia. The representative of Great Britain, Count Clarendon, tried to insist on the provision that the Kuban River was a border between the possessions of Turkey and Russia, but the Turkish and French sides agreed with the opinion of the Russian commissioner Philip Brunnov that the Treaty of Adrianople designated the territory south of the Kuban as Russian possessions. The Paris treaty caused disappointment among the Circassian leaders, who hoped to achieve the independence of Circassia. In a letter to Major General Filipson, Zaneqo wrote: "We demand that all governments consider us a distinct people".

The Treaty of Paris (1856) ended the conflict, frustrating at the same time any hopes of Circassian independence. The Circassians remained politically divided and when Mohammed Amin replaced Zaneqo as the new governor, the two sides fought a second battle this time on the Sup river. An intervention of tribal elders led to compromise, when the two leaders agreed to jointly travel to Constantinople and have the sultan settle the dispute. However Zaneqo broke his oath and remained in Circassia. Zaneqo was in fact following secret Ottoman orders as he was tasked with supervising the withdrawal of the Ottoman army from the region during the course of June. He then resettled to the Shapsykhua river, destroyed the port of Tuapse to prevent Amin's supporters from using it as a supply route and called for the latter's assassination. During the second half of the year Zaneqo attempted to negotiate a peace treaty with the Russians. In January 1857, a sanguine battle between Zaneqo's and Amin's forces took place in Tuapse, Zaneqo's son Karabatir emerged victorious. Russian intelligence was well aware of the British and Ottoman involvement in the affairs of the Caucasus. In May 1857, Amin was invited to Constantinople and immediately arrested, and exiled to Damascus, a move previously planned by the imperial Majlis in an effort to improve relations with Russia. At the same time shipments of arms and ammunition to the rebels were halted. Zaneqo died in Shapsughia on 1 January 1860, oblivious to the change in Ottoman policy. He was buried in the Vordobgach valley. Karabatir succeeded him as one of the leader of Circassian resistance. The Russo-Circassian War officially ended on June 2, 1864, the Circassian genocide was to follow.

== Circassian flag ==
Zaneqo designed the Circassian Flag, the national flag of Circassians. It consists of a green field charged with twelve gold stars, nine forming an arc resembling a bow and three horizontal, also charged with three crossed arrows in the center. Every year, April 25 is celebrated as the Circassian flag day by Circassians. Another version of the flag is currently officially used by the Republic of Adygea of the Russian Federation as its national flag.

== Crimean War ==
On 4 October 1853, the Ottomans declared war on Russia launching the Crimean War. The Ottomans recruited Zaneqo and other Circassians into their army in preparation for an offensive on the Caucasus front in spring of 1854. Zaneqo was appointed as the Ottoman governor of Circassia, receiving the honorary title of pasha. On 29 October, two messengers carrying orders for Mohammed Amin Imam Shamil's naib in Circassia were dispatched from Trabzon to recruit fighters in preparation for his arrival. On 27 March 1854, Russia withdrew from its Circassian forts with the exception of Anapa and Novorossiysk as defensive measure due to the intervention of Britain and France into the conflict. In May, an Ottoman fleet carrying 300 Circassians including Zaneqo, supplies and military advisors sailed to Sukhum Kale. Zaneqo soon clashed with Mohammed Amin, when the latter refused to supply the Ottomans with recruits for fear that they will be pressed to fight outside of their homeland. In July, Amin was also elevated to pasha, exacerbating the power struggle between the two men. In March 1855, troops loyal to Zaneqo clashed with Amin's supporters on the banks of the river Sebzh. Zaneqo remained in Sukhum Kale until 10 June when he relocated to Anapa which had been recently abandoned by the Russians. In order to bridge the divide in the Circassian society created by Zaneqo's rivalry with Amin, the Ottomans placed both under the command of their countryman Mustapha Pasha.
