= Circassia =

Former country and region in Eastern Europe

Circassia Адыгей (Adyghe) Адыгэ Хэку (Adyghe) ("Circassian Homeland") Хэкужъ (Adyghe) ("Old Homeland")
- c. 13th century–1864
- Flag (Note: During the 19th century, this design, based on previous Circassian symbols such as the Coat of Arms of Kabardia, with varying colours, was used as the "Unitary Banner" of Confederate Circassia. Each star on the flag represents a Circassian tribe who joined the confederation, thus at some periods the number of stars changed, although 12 is the standard and the final version. The three arrows represent peace and self defense, which was their meaning in Khabze tradition. The modern-day ethnic flag of the Circassians as well as the flag of Adygea is based on this historical flag, but the colours are slightly different, as the stars and arrows are all gold in color.) Coat of arms (Note: The first (left) is the coat of arms of Circassia found in Russian archives and European heraldry books, while the second (right) is the version proposed for the Circassian Confederation in the 1860s.)
- Motto: ЛIэныгъэ е Шъхьафитныгъэ (Adyghe) ("Death or Independence") (Note: Slogan adopted by the Circassian Confederation in the 19th century) Псэм ипэ напэ (Adyghe) ("Honour before life") (Note: Motto of the Circassian nobility)
- Area marked Circassia
- Official languages: Circassian languages
- Other languages: Ubykh; Abazin
- Religion: Circassian paganism; Judaism (c. 700s); Eastern Orthodoxy (c. 700s–c. 1600s); Roman Catholicism (c. 1300s); Sunni Islam (c. 1600s–1864)
- Demonym: Circassian
- Government: Union of Regional Councils
  - Leader: see Rulers of Circassia & Grand Prince of Kabardia
- Legislature: Lepq Zefes; Parliament of Independence (1860-1864)
- History
  - Established: c. 13th century
  - Disestablished: 1864

Area
  - Total: 82,000 km^{2} (32,000 sq mi)

Population
  - Estimate: 1,625,000–3,000,000 (pre-Circassian genocide); 86,655 (post-Circassian genocide)
- Currency: No official currency. Ottoman coins served as de facto currency
| Preceded by | Succeeded by |
| Zichia | Russian Empire |

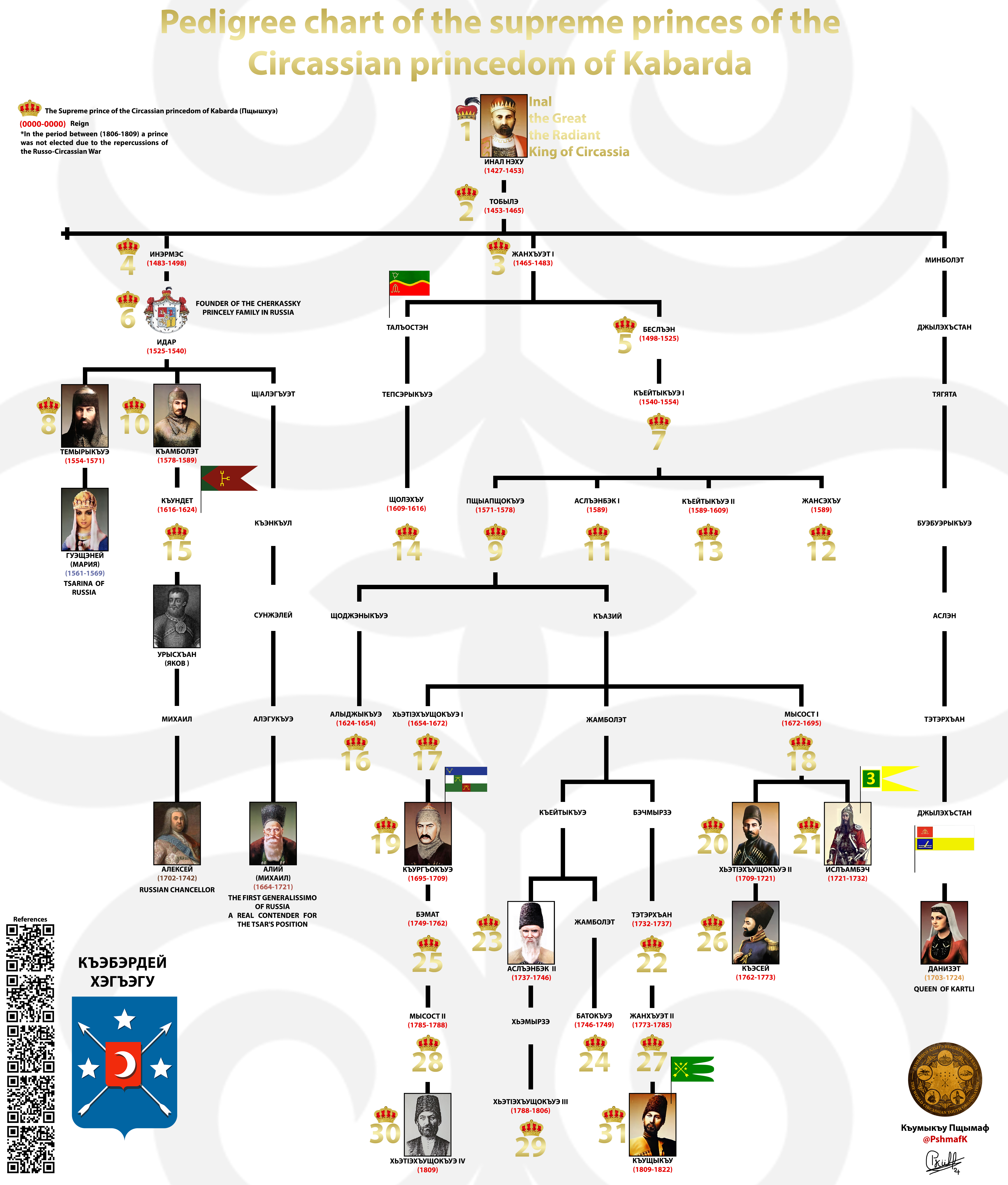
Princes of East Circassia

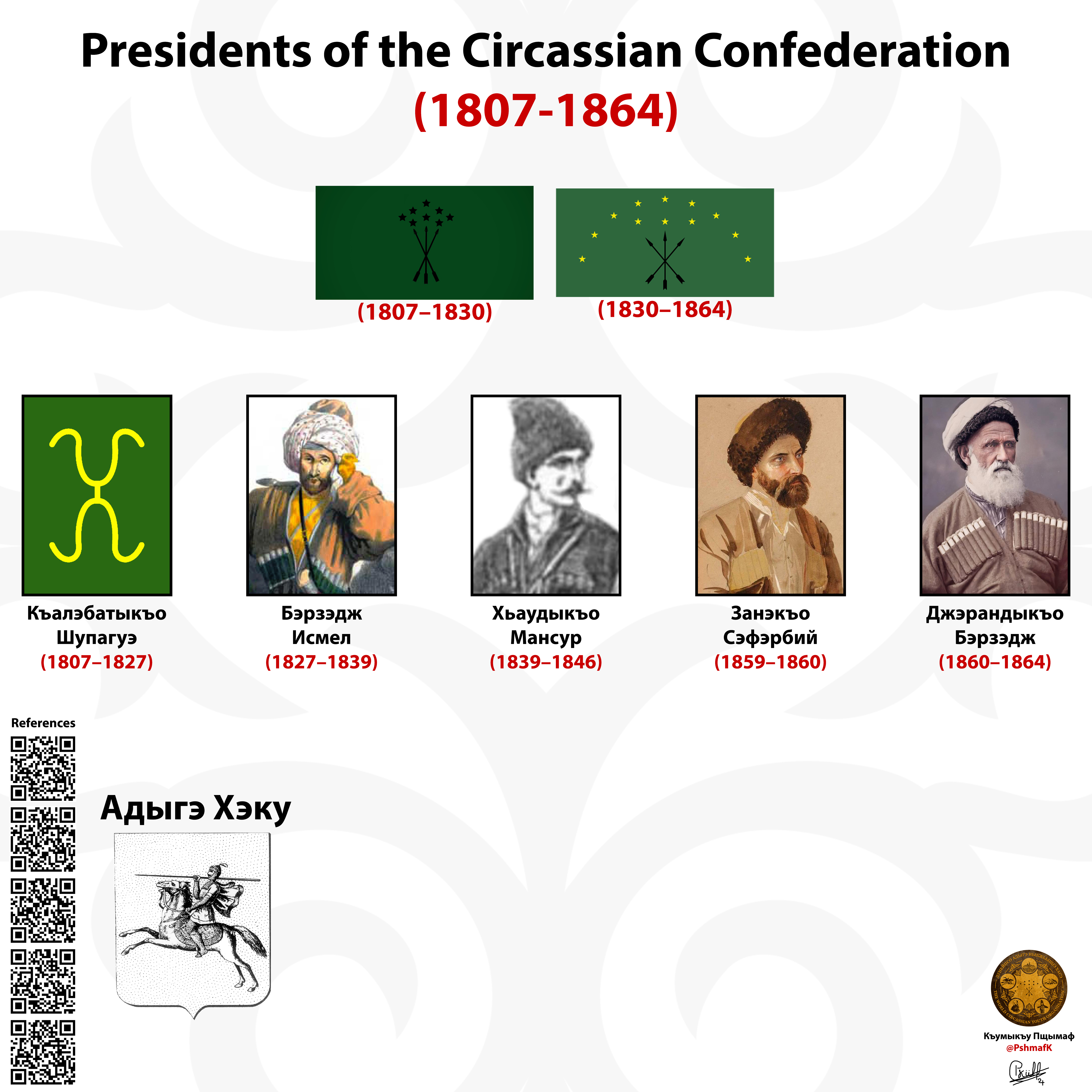
Presidents of the Circassian Confederation

Circassia (Note: Adyghe: Адыгэ Хэку/Хэкужъ, romanized: Adyge Kheku, Khekurz, lit. 'Circassian Homeland/Ancient Homeland') (/sərˈkæʃə/ sər-KASH-ə), also known as Zichia, was a country and a historical region in Eastern Europe. It spanned the western coastal portions of the North Caucasus, along the northeastern shore of the Black Sea. Circassia ceased to exist after being conquered by the Russian Empire during the Russo-Circassian War (1763–1864), which led to approximately 80–97% of the Circassian people being either exiled or massacred in the Circassian genocide.

In the medieval era, Circassia was nominally ruled by an elected Grand Prince, but individual principalities and tribes were autonomous. In the 18th–19th centuries, a central government began to form. The Circassians also dominated the northern end of the Kuban River, but were eventually pushed back to the south of the Kuban after suffering losses to military raids conducted by the Mongol Empire, the Golden Horde, and the Crimean Khanate. Their reduced borders then stretched from the Taman Peninsula to modern-day North Ossetia. The term Circassia is also used as the collective name of various Circassian states that were established within historical Circassian territory, such as Zichia.

Legally and internationally, the Treaty of Belgrade, which was signed between Austria and the Ottoman Empire in 1739, provided for the recognition of the independence of Princedom of Kabardia (Eastern Circassia). Both the Russian Empire and the Ottoman Empire recognized it under witness from the other great powers of the time. The Congress of Vienna also stipulated the recognition of the independence of Circassia. In 1837, Circassian leaders sent letters to a number of European states requesting diplomatic recognition. Following this, the United Kingdom recognized Circassia. However, following the outbreak of the Russo-Circassian War, the Russian Empire did not recognize Circassia as an independent nation and instead treated it as Russian land under rebel occupation, despite having no control or ownership over the region. Russian generals often referred to the Circassians as "mountaineers", "bandits", and "mountain scum" rather than by their ethnonym.

The Russian conquest of Circassia created the Circassian diaspora; the overwhelming majority of Circassians today live outside of their ancestral homeland, mostly in Turkey and other parts of the Middle East. Only about 14% of the global Circassian population lives in the modern-day Russian Federation.

== Etymology ==
The words Circassia and Circassian (/sərˈkæsiənz/ sər-KASS-ee-ənz) are exonyms, Latinized from the word Cherkess, which is of debated origin. One view is that its root stems from Turkic languages, and that the term means "head choppers" or "warrior killers" accounting for the successful battle practices of the Circassians. There are those who argue that the term comes from Mongolian Jerkes, meaning "one who blocks a path". Some believe it comes from Siraces, the Ancient Greek name of a tribe that lived in the Caucasus. According to another view, its origin is Persian.

In languages spoken geographically close to the Caucasus, the native people originally had other names for the Circassia, but with Russian influence, the name has been settled as Cherkessia/Circassia. It is the same or similar in many world languages that cite these languages.

Circassians themselves don't use the term "Circassia", and refer to their country as Адыгэ Хэку (Adıgə Xəku) or Адыгей (Adıgey).

Another historical name for the country was Zichia (or Zyx; the tribe living there was called Zygii), who was described by the ancient Greek intellectual Strabo as a nation to the north of Colchis.

== Geography ==
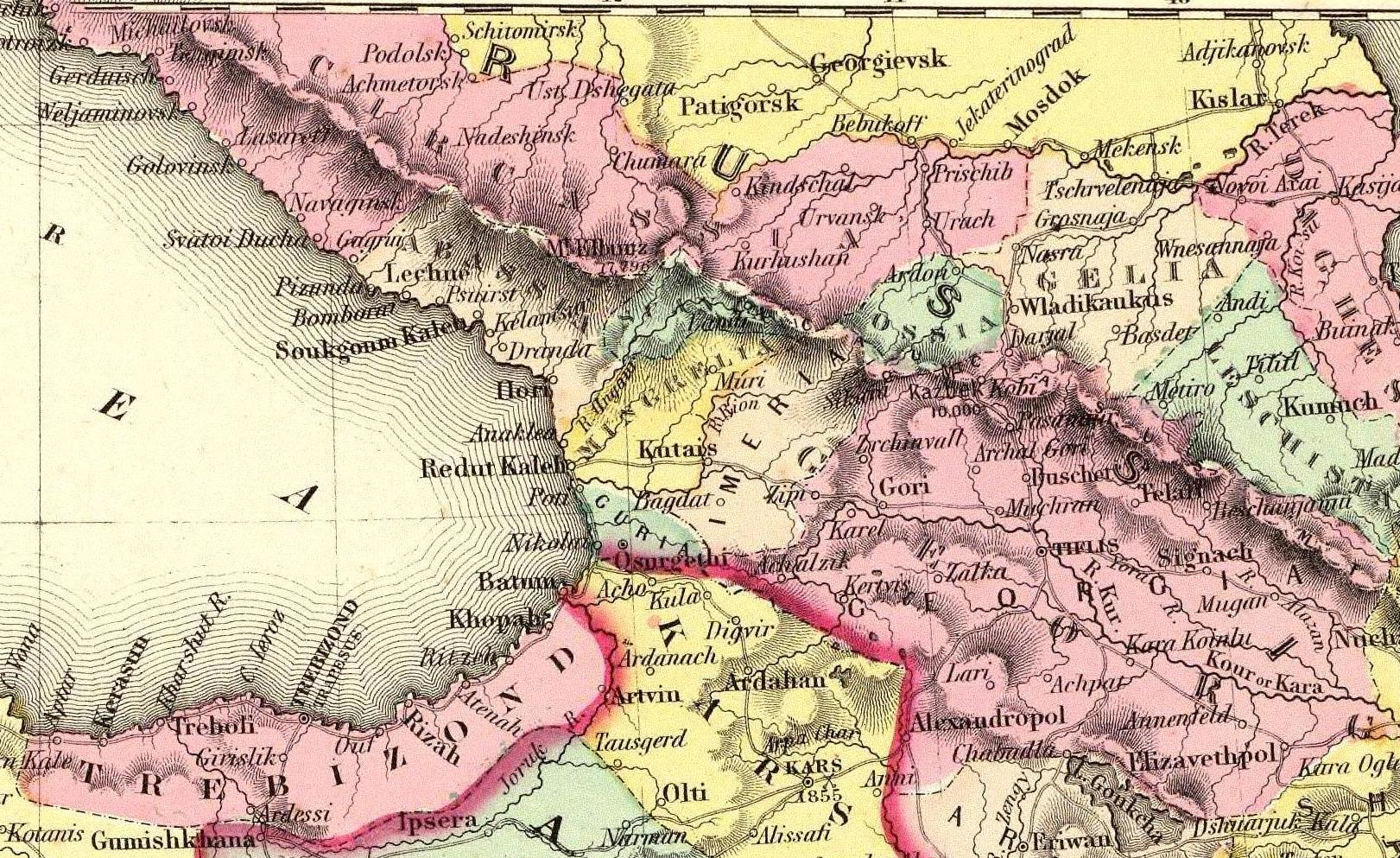
Circassia in 1856

Circassia was located north of Western Asia, near the northeastern Black Sea coast. Before the Russian conquest of the Caucasus (1763–1864), it covered the entire fertile plateau and the steppe of the northwestern region of the Caucasus, with an estimated population of 1 million.

Circassia's historical great range extended from the Taman Peninsula in the west, to the town of Mozdok in today's North Ossetia–Alania in the east. Historically, Circassia covered the southern half of today's Krasnodar Krai, the Republic of Adygea, Karachay-Cherkessia, Kabardino-Balkaria, and parts of North Ossetia–Alania and Stavropol Krai, bounded by the Kuban River on the north which separated it from the Russian Empire. In the Middle Ages, Circassia also included part of the Crimean Peninsula.

On the Black Sea coast, the climate is warm and humid, while being moderate in the lowlands and cooler in the highlands. Most of Circassia is frost free for more than half the year. There are steppe meadows in the plains, beech and oak forests in the foothills, and pine forests and alpine meadows in the mountains.

Sochi is considered by many Circassians as their traditional capital city. According to Circassians, the 2014 Winter Olympic village is built in an area of mass graves of Circassians after their defeat by the Russians Empire in 1864.

== Statehood and politics ==
=== Institute of the Grand Prince of Circassia ===
Between 1427 and 1453, Inal the Great conquered all Circassian principalities and declared himself the Grand Prince of Circassia. Following his death, Circassia was divided again.

The influential principalities of Circassia regularly met to elect a Grand Prince (Пщышхо) among them, with the only condition being that the prince can trace descent from Inal the Great. The existence of such an institute is confirmed by foreign sources. In the eyes of foreign observers, the Grand Prince was considered the king of the Circassians. However, the individual tribes were greatly autonomous and the title was mostly symbolic. In 1237, the Dominican monks Richard and Julian, as part of the Hungarian embassy, visited Circassia and the main city of the country, Matrega, located on the Taman Peninsula. In Matrega, the embassy received a good reception from the Grand Prince.

In the 14th and 15th centuries Italian documents concerning the relationship between the consul of Kafa and Circassia clearly indicate the absolutely special status of the ruler of Circassia. This status allowed the senior prince of Circassia to correspond with the Pope. The letter of Pope John XXII, addressed to the Grand Prince of Zichia (Circassia) Verzacht, dates back to 1333, in which the Roman pontiff thanked the ruler for his diligence in introducing the Catholic faith among his subjects. Verzacht's power status was so high that following his example some other Circassian princes adopted Catholicism.

=== Confederation ===
Circassia traditionally consisted of more than a dozen principalities. Some of these principalities were divided into large feudal estates, characterized by the stability of political status. Within these territories there were numerous feudal possessions of princes (pshi). The Circassian state was a federal state consisting of four levels of government: Village council (чылэ хасэ, made up of village elders and nobles), district council (made up of representatives from 7 neighboring village councils), regional council (шъолъыр хасэ, made up from neighboring district councils), people's council (лъэпкъ зэфэс, where every council had a representative). A central government emerged during the mid to late 1800s. Prior to that, the institute of grand prince was mostly symbolic.

In 1807, Qalebatuqo Hatuqay Shupago self-proclaimed himself as the leader of the Circassian confederation, and divided Circassia into 12 major regions. In 1827, Ismail Berzeg officially declared the military confederation of the Circassian tribes and by 1839 united a significant part of Circassia under his control. In 1839, the Circassians declared Bighuqal (Anapa) as their new capital and Hawduqo Mansur was declared the new leader of the Circassian Confederation. He kept this title until his death. In 1848, Muhammad Amin was the leader of Circassia. After learning that a warriorly scholar has arrived, thousands of families moved to the Abzakh region to accept his rule. Seferbiy Zaneqo assumed power after Amin's departure, but died the next year.

In June 1860, at a congress of representatives of Circassians, a parliament was formed as the highest legislative body of Circassia. Being a political resistance council and the legislature of Circassia, the parliament was established in the capital of Sochi (Adyghe: Шъачэ, romanized: Ş̂açə) on June 13, 1860 and Qerandiqo Berzeg was elected as the head of the parliament and the nation.

=== External relations ===
Legally and internationally, the Treaty of Belgrade 1739 provided for the recognition of the independence of Eastern Circassia (Kabarda), where both the Russian Empire and the Ottoman Empire recognized it, and the great powers at the time witnessed the treaty. The Congress of Vienna held in the period between 1814 and 1815 also stipulated the recognition of the independence of Circassia. In 1837, Circassian leaders sent letters to European countries requesting legal recognition. Following this, the United Kingdom recognized Circassia. However, during the Russian-Circassian War, the Russian Empire did not recognize Circassia as an independent region, and treated it as Russian land under rebel occupation, despite having no control or ownership over the region. Russian generals referred to the Circassians not by their ethnic name, but as "mountaineers", "bandits", and "mountain scum".

The Circassian Parliament launched large-scale foreign policy activities. First of all, an official memorandum was drafted addressed to Tsar Alexander II. The text of the memorandum was presented to the tsar by the leaders of the Parliament during the latter's visit to Circassia in September 1861. The Parliament also accepted an appeal to the Ottoman and European governments. Special envoys were sent to Istanbul and London to seek diplomatic and military support. The activities of the Circassian government received the full support of public organizations, so the Circassian Committee of Istanbul and London supported Circassia. Thus, if not de jure, then de facto Circassia acquired the features of a subject of international law.

==== Relations with the Ottoman Empire ====
In the 16th century, the English traveler Edmund Spencer, who traveled to the shores of the Caucasus, quotes a Circassian saying about the Ottoman sultan:

Circassian blood flows in the veins of the Sultan. His mother, his harem are Circassian; his slaves are Circassians, his ministers and generals are Circassians. He is the head of our faith and also of our race.

== Army ==
Circassia for centuries lived under the threat of external invasions, so the whole way of life of the Circassians was militarized. The governor of Astrakhan wrote to Peter I:

One thing I can praise about the Circassians is that they are all warriors.

Circassia developed the so-called "Culture of War". Honorable combat was a big part of this culture, during hostilities, it was considered strictly unacceptable to set fire to homes or crops, especially bread, even from enemies. It was considered inadmissible to leave the bodies of dead comrades on the battlefield. It was considered a great disgrace in Circassia to fall alive into the hands of the enemy, so Russian officers who later fought in Circassia noted that it was very rare to succeed in capturing Circassians, as they would go as far as suicide. Johann von Blaramberg noted:

When they see that they are surrounded, they give their lives dearly, never surrendering.

The Russian army, after invading Circassia and ethnically cleansing the Circassians in the Circassian genocide, adopted some parts of Circassian military uniforms - from weapons (Shashka and Circassian sabers, daggers, Circassian saddles, Circassian horses) to uniforms (Cherkeska, burqa, papaha).

== History ==
=== Pseudoscientific origin ===
Turkish nationalist groups and proponents of modern-day Pan-Turkism have claimed that the Circassians are of Turkic origin, but no scientific evidence has been published to support this claim and it has been strongly denied by ethnic Circassians, impartial research, linguists and historians around the world. The Circassian language does not share notable similarities to the Turkish language except for borrowed words. According to various historians, the Circassian origin of the Sindo-Meot tribes refutes the claim that the Circassians are of Turkic ethnic origin.

=== Ancient Era ===
==== Maikop Civilization ====
Miyequap (Maikop) civilization was established in 3000 BC. Circassians were known by many different names in ancient times. "Kerket" and "Sucha" are examples. In 1200 BC, Circassians fought alongside the Hittites against the Egyptians.

==== Sindica ====
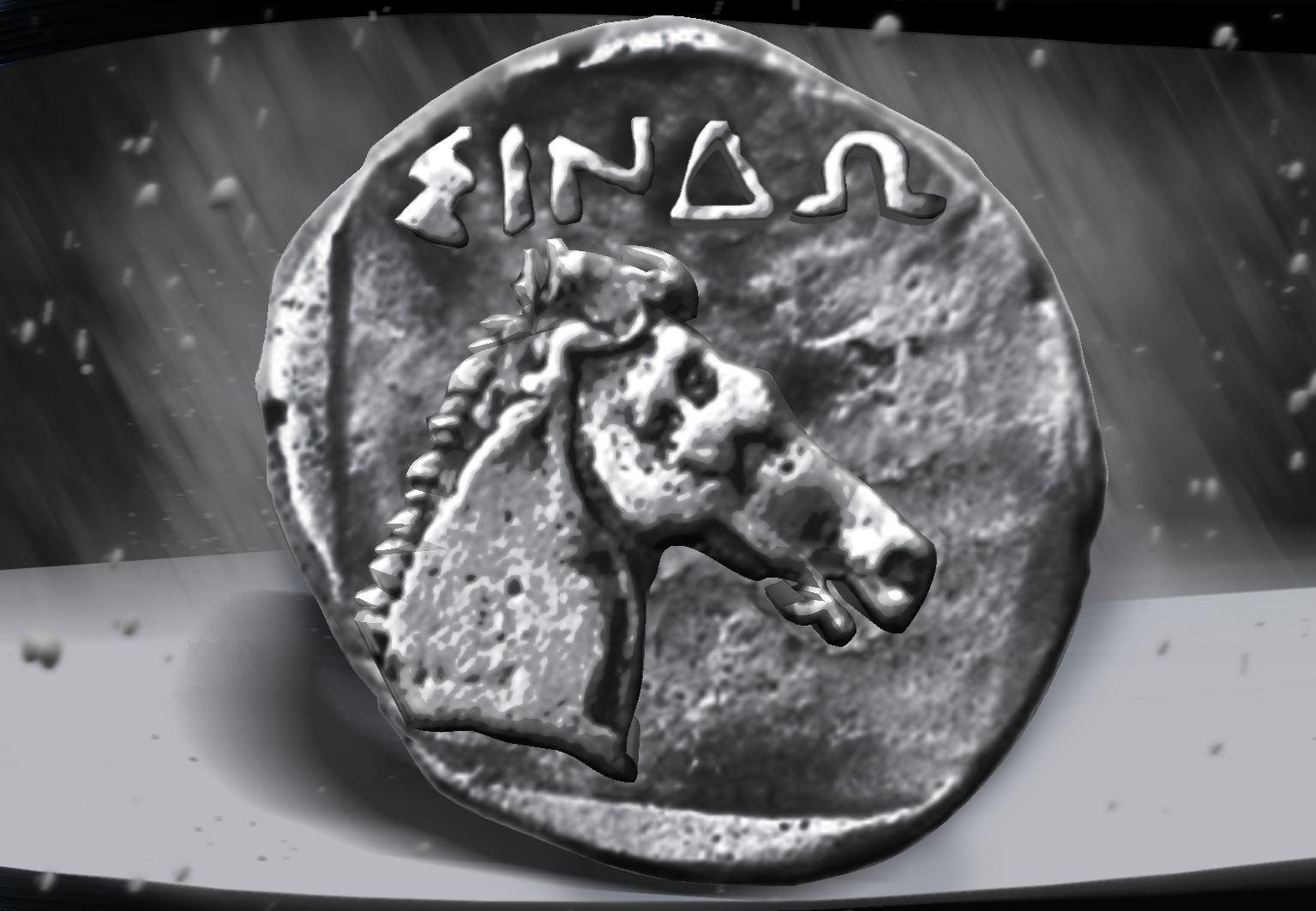
A reconstructed image of a Sindian silver coin discovered in Circassia, with the word "Sindon" written in Greek alphabet and a horse, estimated to be from the late 5th century, discovered in 1959.

The Sindica Kingdom was founded in 800 BC. During this period, Greeks (Greeks) and Sindi-Meotay tribes lived in Circassia. Under the roof of this state, Sindi-Meotians in the region became the ancestors of the Circassian people. The Greek poet Hipponax, who lived in the 5th century BC, and Herodotus later mentioned the Sindis. Strabo also mentions the Capitol of Sindia, located near the Black Sea coast. Information on Sindica has been learned from Greek documents and archaeological finds, and there is not much detail. It is not known exactly when the Sindica Kingdom was established, but it is known that the Sindis had a state and trade relations with the Greeks before the establishment of the Greek colonies on the Black Sea coast. It is also known that the kingdom of Sindica was a busy trading state where artists and merchants were accommodated. Circassians could not establish a union for a long time after this state.

=== Medieval Era ===
Feudalism began to emerge in Circassians by the 4th century. As a result of Armenian, Greek and Byzantine influence, Christianity spread throughout the Caucasus between the 3rd and 5th centuries AD. During that period the Circassians (referred to at the time as Kassogs) began to accept Christianity as a national religion, but did not abandon all elements of their indigenous religious beliefs. Circassians established many states, but could not achieve political unity. From around 400 AD wave after wave of invaders began to invade the lands of the Adyghe people, who were also known as the Kasogi (or Kassogs) at the time. They were conquered first by the Bulgars (who originated on the Central Asian steppes). Outsiders sometimes confused the Adyghe people with the similarly named Utigurs (a branch of the Bulgars), and both peoples were sometimes conflated under misnomers such as "Utige". Following the dissolution of the Khazar state, the Adyghe people were integrated around the end of the 1st millennium AD into the Kingdom of Alania. Between the 10th and 13th centuries Adyghe Circassian peoples were under Georgian sphere of influence.

The Mongols, who started invading the Caucasus in 1223, destroyed some of the Circassians and most of the Alans. The Circassians, who lost most of their lands during the ensuing Golden Horde attacks, had to retreat to the back of the Kuban River. In 1395 Circassians fought violent wars against Tamerlane, and Tamerlane plundered Circassia. Meanwhile, in 1382, Circassian mamluks took the Mamluk throne; the Burji dynasty took over and the Mamluks became ruled by Circassians.

The most detailed description of medieval Circassia was made by Johannes de Galonifontibus in 1404. From his writing it follows that at the turn of the XIV and XV centuries, Circassia expanded its borders to the north to the mouth of the Don, and he notes that “the city and port of Tana is located in the same country in Upper Circassia, on the Don River, which separates Europe from Asia".

=== King Inal the Great ===
Inal is called the "Prince of Princes" by Circassians, because he united all Circassian tribes and established the Circassian state. According to popular belief, Inal is the ancestor of Kabardian, Besleney, Chemguy and Hatuqay princes.

Inal, who during the 1400s owned land in the Taman peninsula, established an army consisting mostly of the Khegayk tribe and declared that his goal was to unite the Circassians, which were divided into many states at that time, under a single state, and after declaring his own princedom, conquered all of Circassia one by one.

Circassian nobles and princes tried to prevent Inal's rise, but in a battle near the Msimta River, 30 Circassian lords were defeated by Inal and his supporters. Ten of them were executed, while the remaining twenty lords took an oath of allegiance and joined the forces into Inal's new state. Inal, who ruled Western Circassia, established the Kabarda region in Eastern Circassia in 1434 and drove the Crimean Tatar tribes in the Circassian lands to the north of the Kuban River in 1438, and as a result of his effective expansions, he was ruling all of the Circassian land.

The capital of this new Circassian state founded by Inal became the city of Shanjir, built in the Taman region where he was born and raised. Although the exact location of the city of Shanjir is unknown, the most supported theory is that it is the Krasnaya Batareya district, which fits the descriptions of the city made by Klarapoth and Pallas.

Inal divided his lands between his sons in 1453 and died in 1458. Following this, Circassian tribal principalities were established. Some of these are Chemguy founded by Chemrug, Besleney founded by Beslan, Kabardia founded by Tabulda and Zhaney founded by Zan.

At the end of the 15th century, a detailed description of Circassia and of its inhabitants was made by Genovese traveller and ethnographer Giorgio Interiano.

=== Modern Era ===
==== Kanzhal ====
In 1708, Circassians paid a great tribute to the Ottoman sultan in order to prevent Tatar raids, but the sultan did not fulfill the obligation and the Tatars raided all the way to the center of Circassia, robbing everything they could. For this reason, Kabardian Circassians announced that they would never pay tribute to the Crimean Khan and the Ottoman Sultan again sent the leadership of the Crimean khan Kaplan-Girey to Kabardia to conquer the Circassians and ordered him collect the tribute. The Ottomans expected an easy victory against the Kabardinians, but the Circassians won because of the strategy set up by the Kazaniko Jabagh.

The Crimean army was completely destroyed overnight. The Crimean Khan Kaplan-Giray barely managed to save his life, and was humiliated, all the way to his shoes taken, leaving his brother, son, field tools, tents and personal belongings.

==== Russo-Circassian War ====
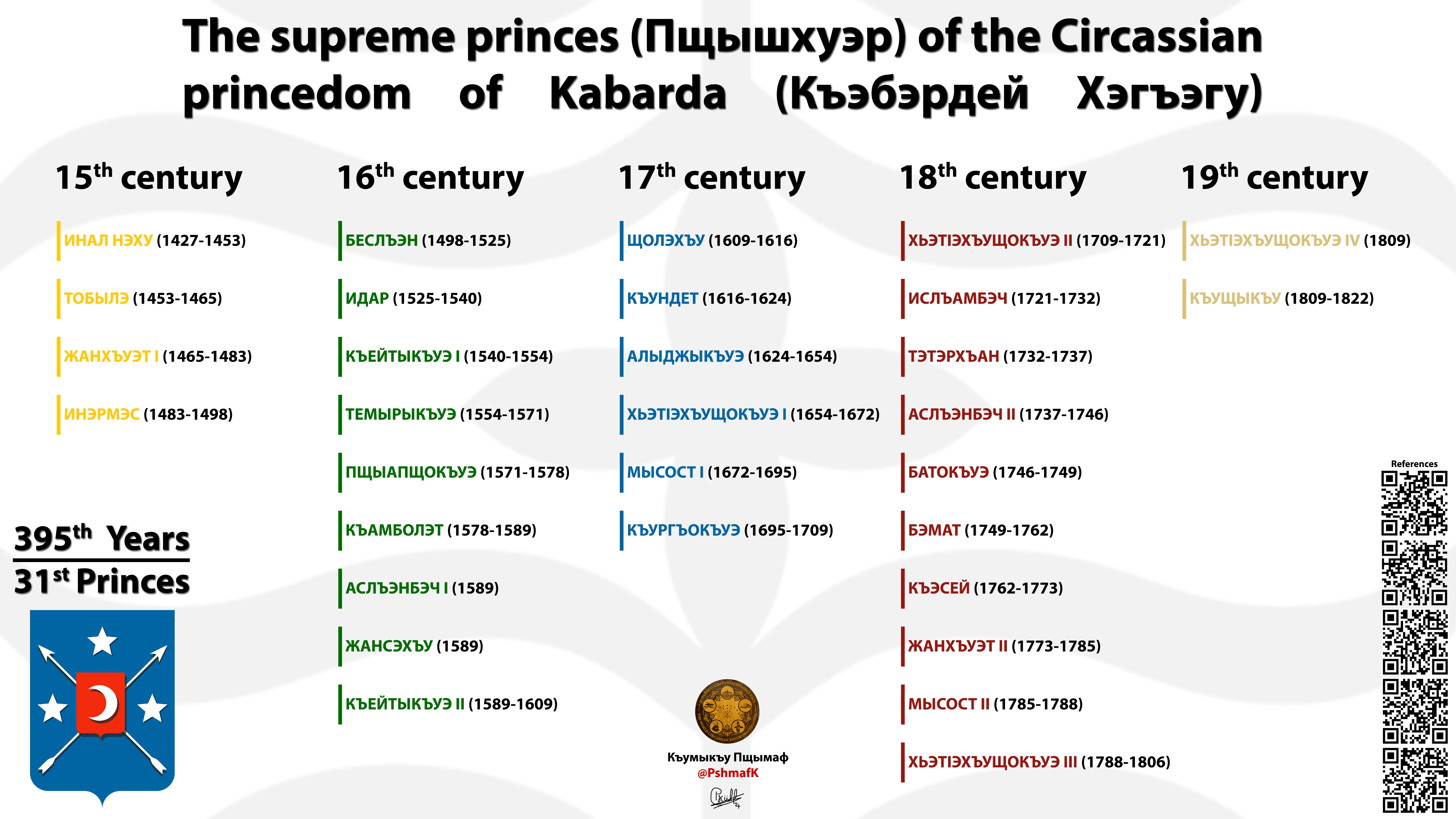
Kabarda (east Circassia) supreme princes

In 1714, Peter I established a plan to occupy the Caucasus. Although he was unable to implement this plan, he laid the political and ideological foundation for the occupation to take place. Catherine II started putting this plan into action. The Russian army was deployed on the banks of the Terek River.

During the Persian expedition of 1796, Russia again conquered the west coast of the Caspian, but the expedition was withdrawn after Catherine's death in November 1796 by her son and successor Paul I. By around 1800, Russia was in a position to push soldiers and colonists into the Caucasus region.

The Russian military tried to impose its authority by building a series of forts, but these forts in turn became the new targets of raids and indeed sometimes the highlanders actually captured and held the forts. Under Yermolov, the Russian military began using a strategy of disproportionate retribution for the raids against their forts before. Russian troops retaliated by destroying villages where resistance fighters were thought to hide, as well as employing assassinations, kidnappings and the execution of whole families. Because the resistance was relying on sympathetic villages for food, the Russian military also systematically destroyed crops and livestock and killed Circassian civilians. Circassians responded by creating a tribal federation encompassing all tribes of the area. In 1840 Karl Friedrich Neumann estimated the Circassian casualties at around one and a half million. Some sources state that hundreds of thousands of others died during the exodus. Several historians use the phrase "Circassian massacres" for the consequences of Russian actions in the region.

In a series of sweeping military campaigns lasting from 1860 to 1864... the northwest Caucasus and the Black Sea coast were virtually emptied of Muslim villagers. Columns of the displaced were marched either to the Kuban [River] plains or toward the coast for transport to the Ottoman Empire... One after another, entire Circassian tribal groups were dispersed, resettled, or killed en masse.

Circassians established an assembly called "Great Freedom Assembly" in the capital city of Shashe (Sochi) on June 25, 1861. Haji Qerandiqo Berzedj was appointed as the head of the assembly. This assembly asked for help from Europe, arguing that they would be forced into exile soon. However, before the result was achieved, Russian General Kolyobakin invaded Sochi and destroyed the parliament and no country opposed this.

In May 1864, a final battle took place between the Circassian army of 20,000 Circassian horsemen and a fully equipped Russian army of 100,000 men. Circassian warriors attacked the Russian army and tried to break through the line, but most were shot down by Russian artillery and infantry. The remaining fighters continued to fight as militants and were soon defeated. All 20,000 Circassian horsemen died in the war. The Russian army began celebrating victory on the corpses of Circassian soldiers, and so May 21, 1864, was officially the end of the war.

==== Circassian Genocide ====
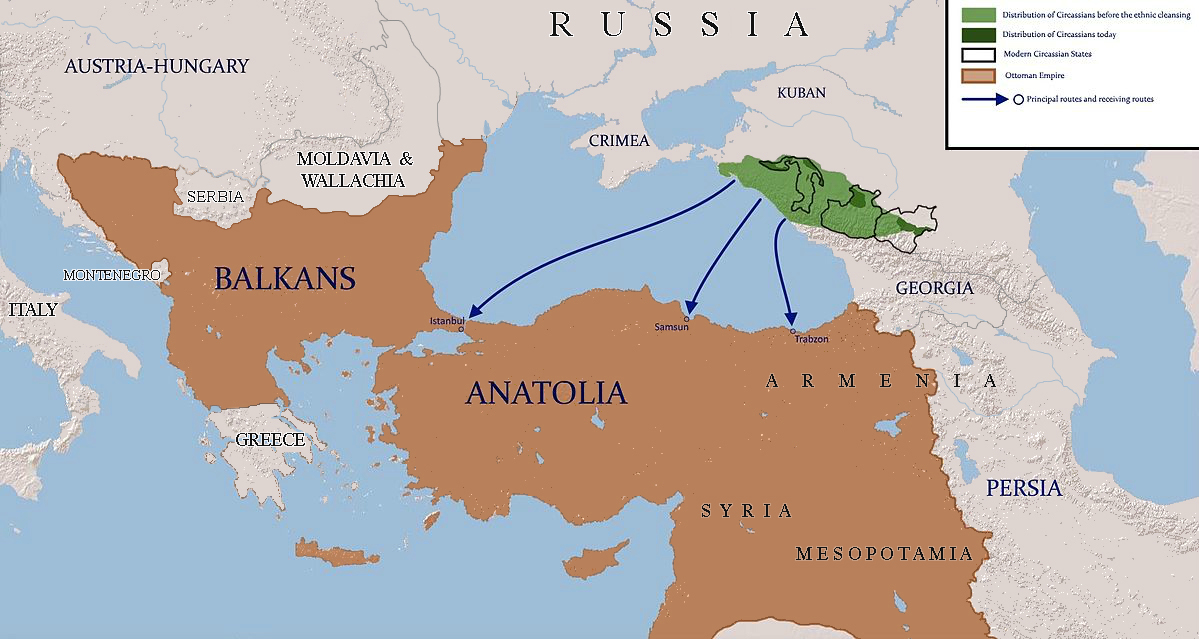
A map of the expulsion of Circassians to the Ottoman Empire. The light-green area denotes the final borders of Circassians who had already been pushed southwards prior to their expulsion to the Ottoman Empire. In the late 18th century, Circassians lost their northern territories, which do not appear in green on this map.

The proposal to deport the Circassians was ratified by the Russian government, and a flood of refugee movements began as Russian troops advanced in their final campaign. Circassians prepared to resist and hold their last stand against Russian military advances and troops. With the refusal to surrender, Circassian civilians were targeted one by one by the Russian military with thousands massacred and the Russians started to raid and burn Circassian villages, destroy the fields to make it impossible to return, cut trees down and drive the people towards the Black Sea coast.

Although the main target of the genocide was the Circassians, some Abkhaz, Abazin, Chechen, Ossetian and other Muslim Caucasian communities were also affected. Although it is not known exactly how many people are affected, researchers have suggested that at least 75%, 90%, 94%, or 95–97% of the ethnic Circassian population are affected. Considering these rates, calculations including those taking into account the Russian government's own archival figures, have estimated a loss 600,000–1,500,000. It is estimated that the population of Kabardins in Circassia was reduced from 500,000 to 35,000; the Abzakhs from 260,000 to 14,600; and the Natukhajs from 240,000 to merely 175 persons. The Shapsugh tribe which numbered some 300,000 were reduced to 3,000 people. Ivan Drozdov, a Russian officer who witnessed the scene at Qbaada in May 1864 as the other Russians were celebrating their victory remarked:

On the road, our eyes were met with a staggering image: corpses of women, children, elderly persons, torn to pieces and half-eaten by dogs; deportees emaciated by hunger and disease, almost too weak to move their legs, collapsing from exhaustion and becoming prey to dogs while still alive.

— Drozdov, Ivan. "Posledniaia Bor’ba s Gortsami na Zapadnom Kavkaze". pp. 456–457.

The Ottoman Empire regarded the Adyghe warriors as courageous and experienced. It encouraged them to settle in various near-border settlements of the Ottoman Empire in order to strengthen the empire's borders.

According to Walter Richmond

Circassia was a small independent nation on the northeastern shore of the Black Sea. For no reason other than ethnic hatred, over the course of hundreds of raids the Russians drove the Circassians from their homeland and deported them to the Ottoman Empire. At least 600,000 people lost their lives to massacre, starvation, and the elements while hundreds of thousands more were forced to leave their homeland. By 1864, three-fourths of the population was annihilated, and the Circassians had become one of the first stateless peoples in modern history.

As of 2026, Georgia and Ukraine were the only country to classify the events as genocide, while Russia actively denies the Circassian genocide, and classifies the events simply as a migration (see Muhacirism). Russian nationalists continue to celebrate the day on May 21 each year as a "holy conquest day", when the Russian Empire's resistance to the occupation of the Caucasus ended. Circassians commemorate May 21 every year as the Circassian Day of Mourning.

== Population ==
There are twelve historic Adyghe (Circassian: Адыгэ, Adyge) princedoms or tribes of Circassia (three democratic and nine aristocratic): Abzakh, Besleney, Bzhedug, Hatuqay, Kabardian, Mamkhegh, Natukhai, Shapsug, Temirgoy, Ubykh, Yegeruqwai and Zhaney.

Today, about 700,000 Circassians remain in historical Circassia in today's Russia. The 2010 Russian Census recorded 718,727 Circassians, of which 516,826 are Kabardians, 124,835 are Adyghe proper, 73,184 are Cherkess and 3,882 Shapsugs. The largest Circassian population resides in Turkey (pop. 1,400,000–6,000,000). Circassian populations also exist in other countries, such as Jordan, Syria, Iraq, Iran, Lebanon, Serbia, Egypt, Libya and Israel, but are considerably smaller.

== National religion ==
Circassia gradually went through the following various religions: Paganism, Christianity, and then Islam.

=== Paganism ===
The ancient beliefs of the Circassians were based on animism and magic, within the framework of the customary rules of Xabze. Although the main belief was Monistic-Monotheistic, they prayed using water, fire, plants, forests, rocks, thunder, and lightning. They performed their acts of worship accompanied by dance and music in the sacred groves used as temples. An old priest led the ceremony, accompanied by songs of prayer, and supplications. It was aimed at protecting newborn babies from diseases and the evil eye. Another important aspect was ancestors and honor. They believed that the goal of man's earthly existence is the perfection of the soul, which corresponds to the maintenance of honour, manifestation of compassion, gratuitous help, which, along with valour, and bravery of a warrior, enables the human soul to join the soul of the ancestors with a clear conscience.

=== Judaism ===
Some Circassian tribes converted to Judaism in the past as a result of the settlement of approximately 20 thousand Jews in 8th-century Circassia, along with the relations established with the Turkic-Jewish Khazar Khaganate. Judaism in Circassia eventually assimilated into Christianity and Islam.

=== Christianity ===
It is the tradition of the early church that Christianity made its first appearance in Circassia in the 1st century AD via the travels and preaching of the Apostle Andrew, but recorded history suggests that, as a result of Greek and Byzantine influence, Christianity first spread throughout Circassia between the 3rd and 5th centuries AD. The spread of the Catholic faith was only possible with the Latin Conquest of Constantinople by the crusaders and the establishment of the Latin state. The Catholic religion was adopted by the Circassians following Farzakht, a distinguished figure who greatly contributed to the spread of this religion in his country. The pope sent him a letter in 1333 thanking him for his effort, as an indication of his gratitude. For Circassians, the most important and attractive personality in all Christian teachings was the personality of Saint George. They saw in him the embodiment of all the virtues respected in the Caucasus. His name in Circassian is "Aushe-Gerge".

Christianity in Circassia experienced its final collapse in the 18th century when almost all Circassians accepted Islam. The ex-priests joined the Circassian nobility and were given the name "shogene" (teacher) and over time this name became a surname.

Today Christianity is still widespread among Mozdok Kabardians.

=== Islam ===
In 815 AD, Islam arrived in Circassia with the efforts of two Arab preachers called Abu Ishaq and Muhammad Kindi, and the first Circassian Muslim community was established with a small amount of followers. A small Muslim community in Circassia has existed since the Middle Ages, but the widespread adoption of Islam occurred after 1717. Travelling Sufi preachers and the increasing threat of an invasion from Russia helped expedite the spread of Islam in Circassia. Circassian scholars educated in the Ottoman Empire boosted the spread of Islam.

== Circassian nationalism ==
Under Russian and Soviet rule, ethnic and tribal divisions between Circassians were promoted, resulting in several different statistical names being used for various parts of the Circassian people (Adyghes, Cherkess, Kabardins, Shapsugs). Consequently, Circassian nationalism has developed. Circassian nationalism is the desire among Circassians all over the world to preserve their culture and save their language from extinction, achieve full international recognition of the Circassian genocide, globally revive Adyghe Xabze among Circassians, return to their homeland Circassia, and ultimately reestablish an independent Circassian state. There is also an effort among Circassians to unite under the name Circassian (Adyghe) in Russian Censuses to reflect and revive the concept of the Circassian nation. The overwhelming majority of the diaspora already tends to call itself "only Circassian".

== See also ==
- Circassian Assembly
- Circassian beauties
- Circassian diaspora
- Circassian music
- Circassian nationalism
- List of Circassian ethnic enclaves

== General references ==
- Bell, James Stanislaus. Journal of a residence in Circassia during the years 1837, 1838, and 1839 (in English).
- Bullough, Oliver. Let Our Fame Be Great: Journeys Among the Defiant People of the Caucasus. Allen Lane, 2010. ISBN 978-1846141416.
- Jaimoukha, Amjad. The Circassians: A Handbook, London: Routledge, New York: Routledge & Palgrave, 2001. ISBN 978-0700706440.
- Jaimoukha, Amjad. Circassian Culture and Folklore: Hospitality, Traditions, Cuisine, Festivals and Music. Bennett & Bloom, 2010. ISBN 978-1898948407.
- Kaziev, Shapi, and Igor Karpeev (Повседневная жизнь горцев Северного Кавказа в XIX в.). Everyday Life of the Caucasian Highlanders: The 19th Century. Moscow: Molodaya Gvardiy, 2003. ISBN 5-235-02585-7
- King, Charles. The Ghost of Freedom: A History of the Caucasus. Oxford University Press, 2008. ISBN 978-0195392395.
- Levene, Mark. Genocide in the Age of the Nation-State. Volume II: The Rise of the West and the Coming of Genocide. London: I. B. Tauris, 2005. ISBN 978-1845110574.
- Richmond, Walter. The Circassian Genocide, Rutgers University Press, 2013. ISBN 9780813560694.
