= Sup River Offensive =

1862 Russian forces operation

- Part of Caucasian War
Date	28–30 December 1862
Location	Sups (river)
Result	See § Aftermath
Territorial changes	Two large Abzakh villages destroyed; Temporary Russian control of Sup Valley; Start of Pkhaznaab Gorge counteroffensive

Belligerents
Russian Empire	Circassians

Commanders and leaders
Colonel Levashov	Unknown

Strength
4 battalions of infantry 1 cavalry sotnia 2 horse artillery guns	Unknown (local militia, irregulars)

Casualties and losses
16 wounded 1 horse killed; 2 wounded	Unknown (5 bodies recovered)
- Over 600 houses destroyed. Significant stores of grain, hay, and livestock seized or burned.

The Sup River Offensive was a punitive operation carried out by Russian forces under Colonel Levashov against the Abzakhs (Circassians) in December 1862.

== Background ==
The Sup River valley was a key region within the Abzakhs territory, which had become increasingly hostile to Russian expansion in the Caucasus. Prior to the operation, several Abzakh villages in the area had been raiding Russian outposts and disrupting supply lines, which prompted the Russian command to send a punitive expedition to suppress the local resistance.

Colonel Levashov's forces, comprising four battalions of infantry, a cavalry sotnia, and two horse artillery guns, were tasked with neutralizing the threat posed by the Abzakhs and reasserting Russian control over the strategically important Sup River valley.

== Operation ==
On the night of 28 December 1862, Levashov's forces began their march towards the Sup River valley. The operation was designed to clear the area of enemy resistance by destroying the Abzakhs villages and eliminating any hostile forces. The Russian advance was initially slow, as the troops moved through difficult terrain, including forests and narrow mountain passes.

Despite the challenges, the Russian forces successfully surprised the Abzakhs defenders, who were taken by surprise at dawn. The Abzakhs had initially attempted to fortify the villages with defensive structures, but their positions were quickly overrun. By 30 December, two major Abzakh villages were destroyed, and Russian forces temporarily gained control of the Sup River valley.

== Aftermath ==
Following the operation, the Russian forces secured a tactical victory, with significant material losses inflicted on the Abzakhs. Over 600 houses were destroyed, and large stores of grain, hay, and livestock were either seized or burned. While the exact casualties on the Abzakhs side remain unclear, five enemy bodies were recovered, and the Russian forces suffered 16 wounded, with some light losses among their cavalry.

The operation temporarily stabilized the situation in the Kuban Oblast, but further Abzakh resistance in the region would lead to additional punitive expeditions in the coming years.
