= Jembulat's Raid near Sabl (1824) =

Event of the Russo-Circassian War

Battle near Sabl
- Part of the Russo-Circassian War
Date	October 1824
Location	Near Sabl village, Circassia
Result	Circassian victory

Belligerents
Circassia; Chemguys; Kabardians; Abzakhs	Russian Empire; Nogais

Commanders and leaders
(Circassia) Jembulat Boletoqo	(Russia) Esaul Popov † (Russia) Colonel Pobednov (Russia) Colonel Isaev

Strength
~800 horsemen	~25 Cossacks; Nogai forces

Casualties and losses
Unknown	All Cossacks killed; 3,000 horses seized

Jembulat’s Raid near Sabl was a raid carried out in October 1824 by Circassian forces, primarily Chemguys, Kabardians, and Abzakhs, under Jembulat Boletoqo near the village of Sabl, against the local Nogai and Cossack forces during the Russo-Circassian War. The raid resulted in a Circassian victory.

== History ==
In October 1824, a mounted force of approximately 800 Circassians and rebel Kabardians, led by Jembulat Boletoqo, launched a raid from the Laba River basin into Kabardia. Near the village of Sabl, the raiders captured a herd of about 3,000 horses.

Local Nogai tribesmen attempted to resist but were surrounded. A detachment of about 25 Cossacks under Esaul Popov rushed to assist but was also encircled near the Barsukly River. Despite fierce resistance, all Cossacks were killed. The raiders successfully withdrew to the mountains with the captured livestock.

Aleksey Velyaminov, the Russian general overseeing the region, criticized several officers—including Colonel Pobednov and Colonel Isaev—for avoiding engagement with the enemy.
