= Talismanic shirt =

Shirt functioning as a talisman in Islamic culture

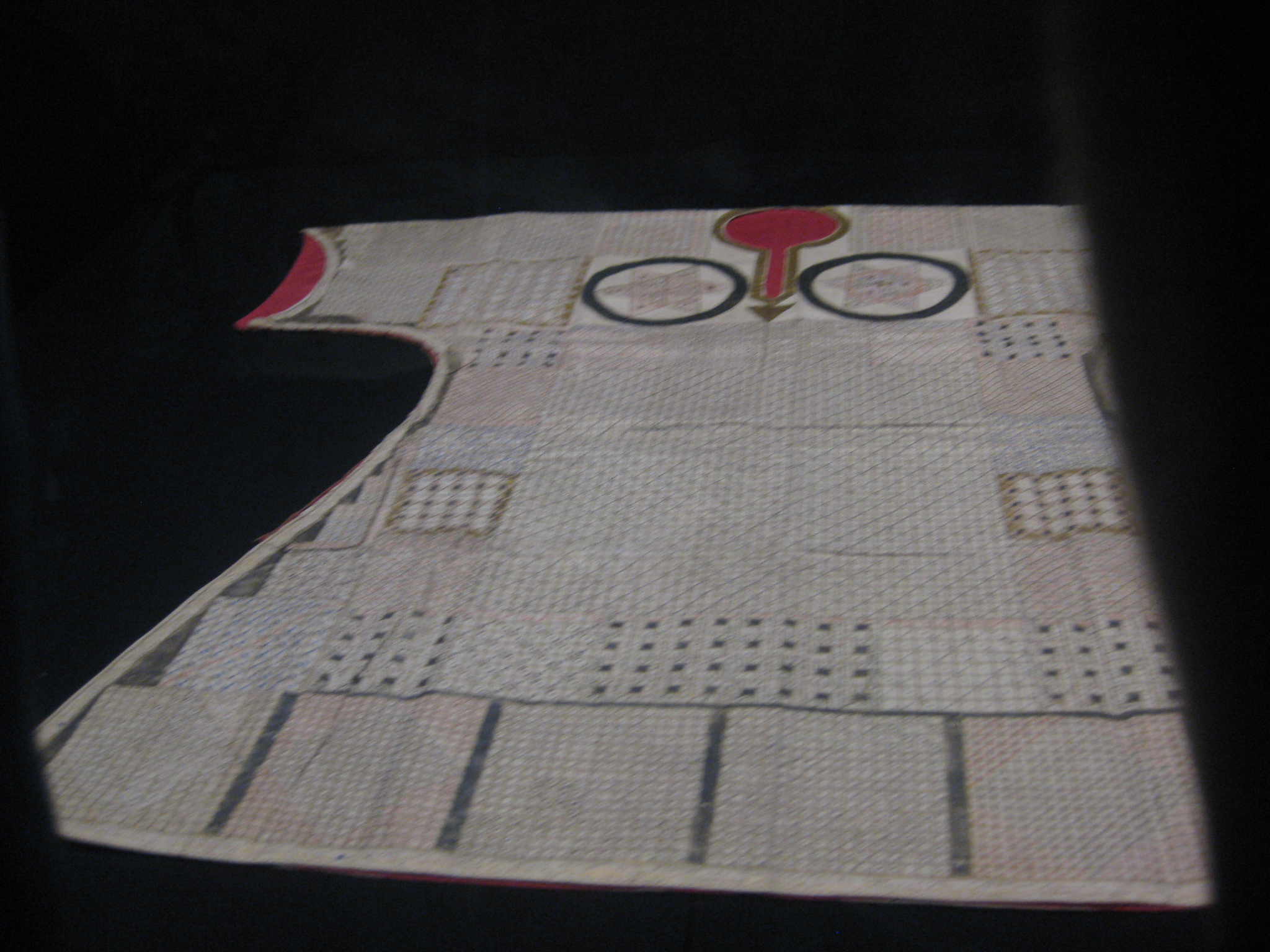
A talismanic shirt in the collection of the Topkapı Palace

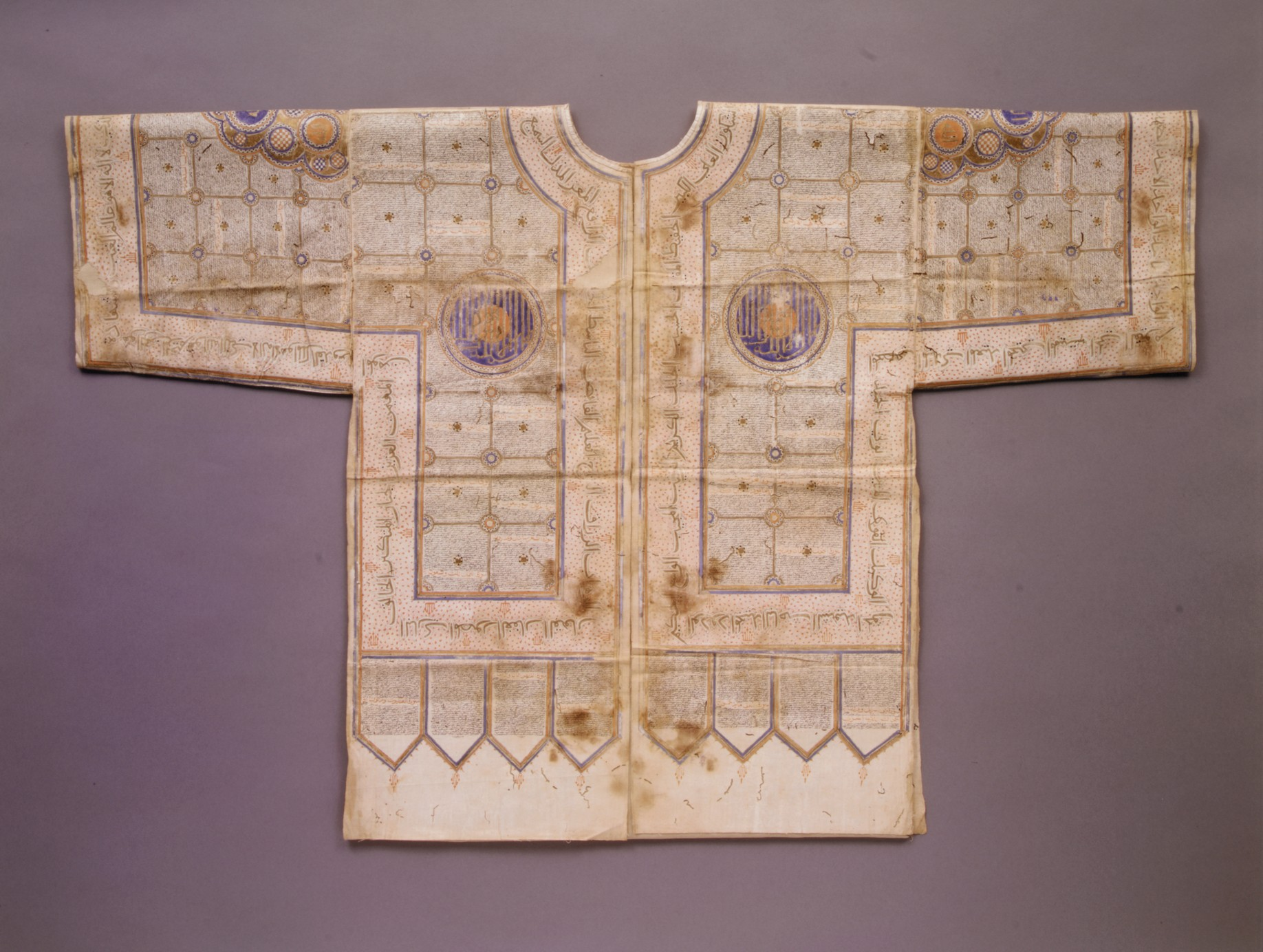
15th–early 16th century talismanic shirt in the Metropolitan Museum of Art. Attributed to North India or the Deccan. Cotton, ink, gold; plain weave, painted

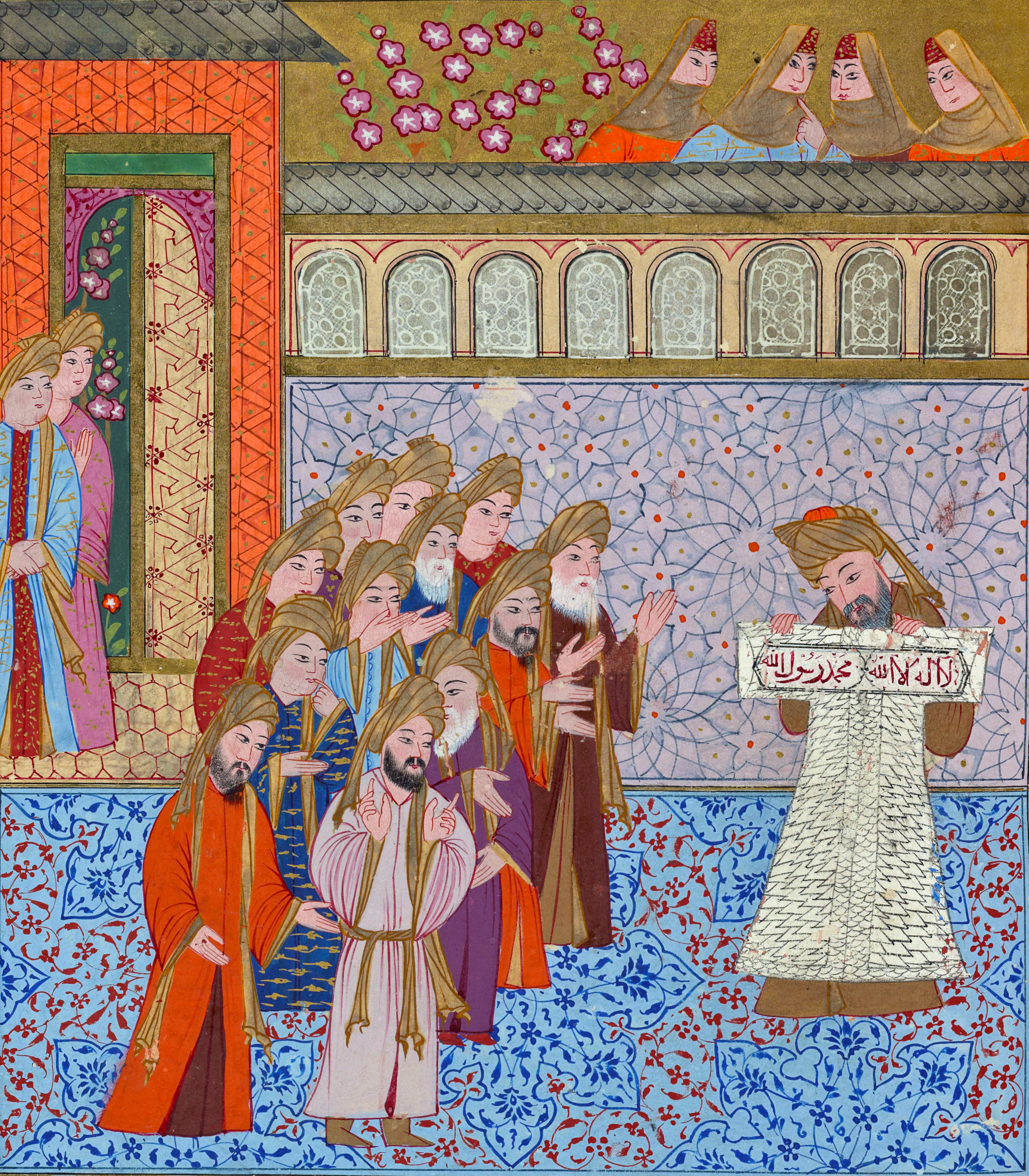
Islamic miniature depicting Ka'b al-Ahbar watching the Islamic declaration of faith appear miraculously on Yahya's talismanic shirt after being cut out once

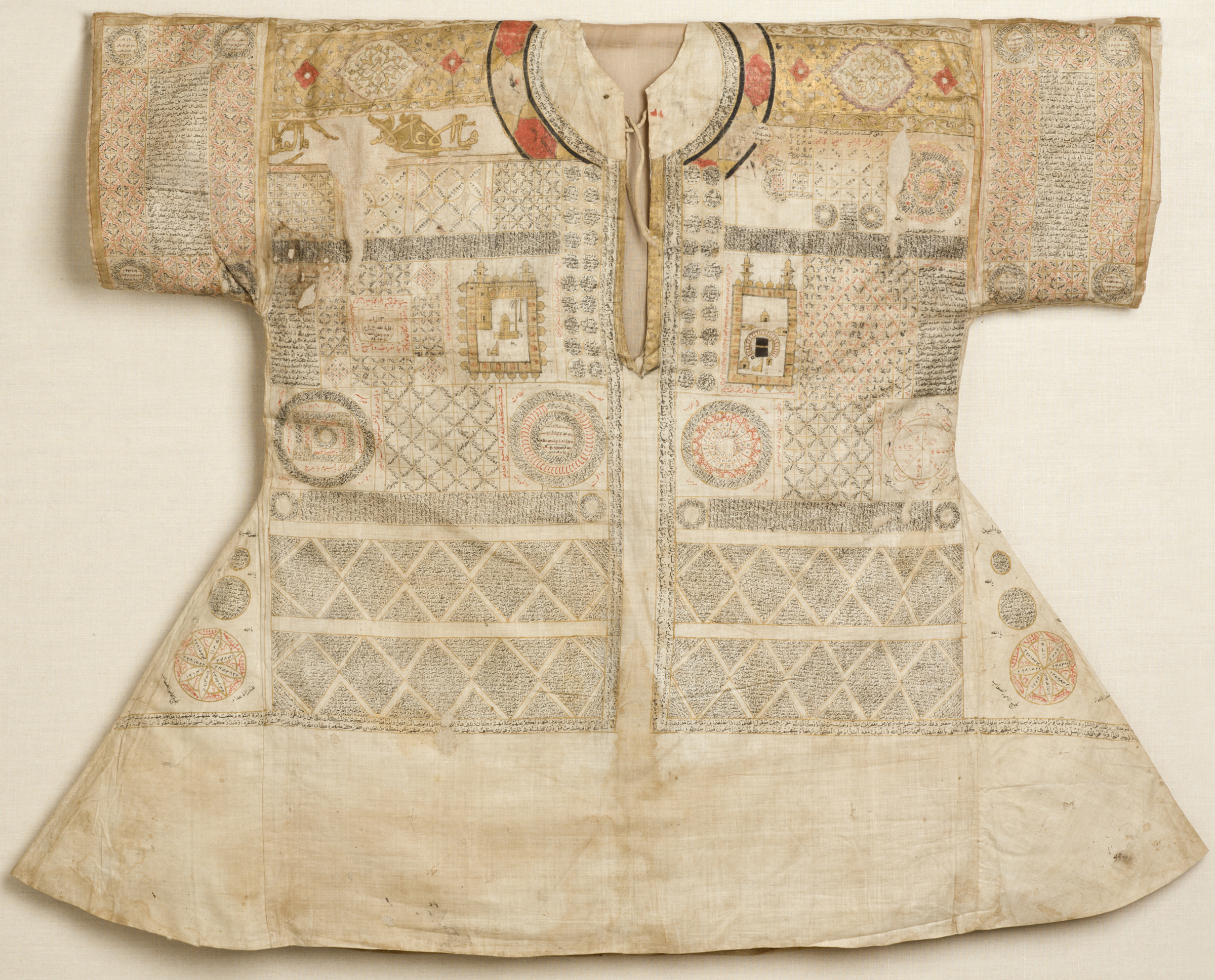
Talismanic shirt depicting the holy sanctuaries of Mecca and Medina, 16th or early 17th century

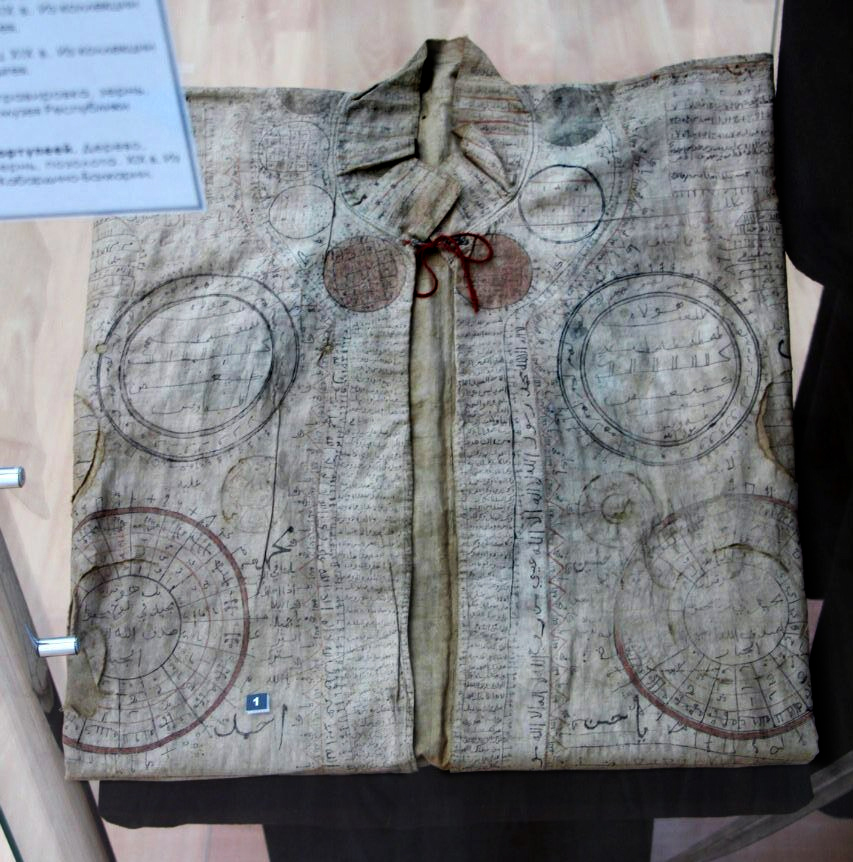
Talismanic shirt of Jembulat Boletoqo. Displayed at the National Museum of the Republic of Adygea

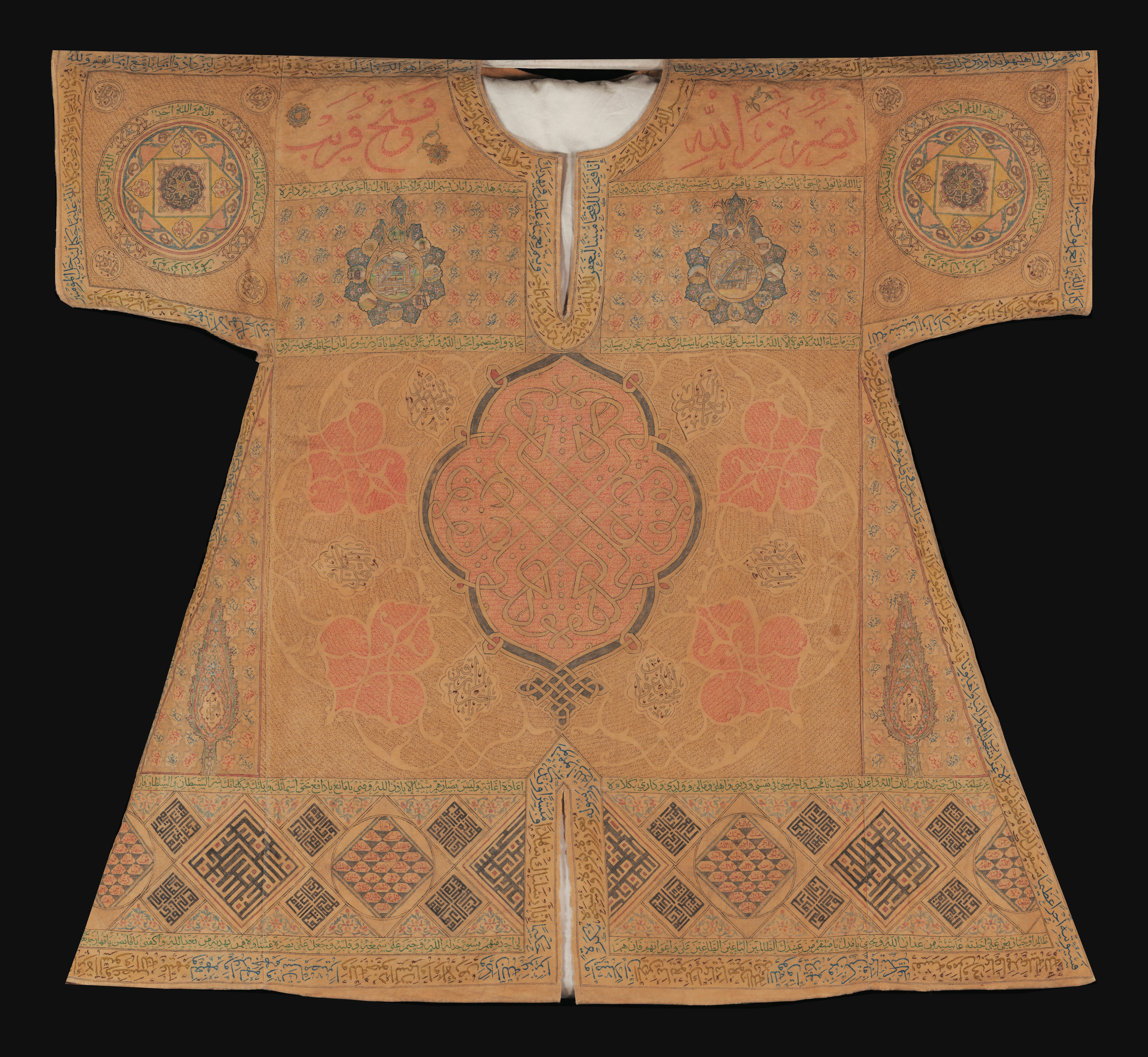
Talismanic shirt inscribed with Qur'anic verses, the Asma' al-Husna, and prayers, with views of Mecca and Medina; 17th century Turkey, Khalili Collection of Hajj and the Arts of Pilgrimage

A talismanic shirt (or talisman shirt; Turkish: tılsımlı gömlek; Persian: پیراهن طلسمات, romanized: pirâhan telesmat) is a worn textile talisman. Talismanic shirts are found throughout the Muslim world. The shirts can be grouped to four types which differ in style and the symbols used: an Ottoman, a Safavid, a Mughal and a West African one.

The earliest surviving examples were made in or near the 15th century, though the tradition of talismanic shirts might be much older. The shirts were inscribed with verses from the Quran, names of Allah and of prophets or with numbers. They could also carry images or symbols, including those from astrology.

The inscribed names are believed to be capable of offering protection and guidance to the carrier. In Surah Yusuf of the Quran, a shirt of the prophet Joseph is described as giving him protection and even miracle-working. He hands it over so it can heal the blindness of his father Jacob: "Go with this my shirt, and cast it over the face of my father: he will come to see"^{[Quran 12:93]}. Although talismanic shirts can be worn to protect against many evils, most of them seem to be intended as a shield in battle. The Ottoman ruler Suleiman the Magnificent was given a talismanic shirt by his wife, Hürrem Sultan, who told him that its inscriptions would protect him from bullets.

== Some examples in collections ==
- Talismanic shirt, Bursa, Turkey, end of the 14th–beginning of the 15th century, Turkish and Islamic Arts Museum, Istanbul, accession number 539
- Talismanic shirt for Sultan Cem, 1480, Topkapı Palace Museum, Istanbul. It was produced when Cem was still Şehzade. Unusually, the beginning and end of the manufacturing of the object are inscribed.
- Talismanic shirt for Sultan Suleiman the Magnificent, Topkapı Palace Museum, Istanbul. It was commissioned by Suleiman's wife Hürrem Sultan.
- Talismanic shirt, Northern India or Deccan, 15th–early 16th century, Metropolitan Museum of Art, New York, accession number 1998.199
- Talismanic shirt, India, 15th–16th century, Victoria and Albert Museum, London, accession number T.59-1935
- The Khalili Collections include four talismanic shirts. The Khalili Collection of Hajj and the Arts of Pilgrimage has shirts from 17th century Turkey (TXT 545) and from 16th or 17th century Mughal India (TXT 471) that depict the holy sites of Mecca and Medina and are inscribed with prayers and extracts from the Quran. The one from Turkey is unusual in having realistic, rather than schematic, depictions of the holy sites. The Khalili Collection of Islamic Art includes shirts from 16th century Turkey (TXT 463) and 18th/19th century India (TXT 574).
- Talismanic shirt of Jembulat Boletoqo, the Chemguy Grand Prince of Circassia (1827–1836). Displayed at the National Museum of the Republic of Adygea.

== See also ==
- Ghost shirt – Historic Indigenous religious clothing
- Cloak of Muhammad – Cloak believed to have been worn by the founder of Islam
- Relics of Muhammad – Relics of the Islamic prophet Muhammad
