= Tembot Kerashev =

- КӀэрэщэ Мухьэмэд ыкъо Тембот
- Born: Tembot Magometovich Kerashev; August 16, 1902; Koshekhabl, Kuban Oblast, Russian Empire
- Died: February 8, 1988 (aged 85); Maykop, Adyghe Autonomous Oblast, Russian SFSR, Soviet Union
- Occupations: Novelist, researcher
- Writing career
- Language: Adyghe, Russian
- Genres: Novel, novella, short story
- Notable works: "Arq" (1925), The Road to Happiness (1939)
- Notable awards: Order of Lenin; Order of the October Revolution; Order of the Red Banner of Labour; Order of Friendship of Peoples
- Literary movement: Socialist realism

Tembot Magometovich Kerashev (1902-1988) was a Circassian Soviet writer. He was awarded the third degree Stalin Prize in 1948.

== Biography ==
He was born on August 16, 1902, in the village of Koshekhabl (now in Adygea) to a peasant family.

He graduated from a private Tatar school, then studied at a teachers' seminary in Ufa (1913-1914), a modern school and secondary school in Abinskaya (1918-1920), and the Krasnodar Polytechnic Institute. He worked as an archivist for the Organizational Department of the Adyghe Regional Executive Committee. In 1929, he graduated from the Moscow Industrial and Economic Institute, after which he returned to the Adyghe Autonomous Oblast. There, he worked as the editor of a regional newspaper and the manager of the Adyghe National Publishing House. In 1931, the Presidium of the Adyghe Regional Executive Committee appointed him director of the Adyghe Scientific Research Institute of Local Lore, a position he held until 1934. He then worked as an associate professor at the Krasnodar Institute (1934-1936), before returning to the Research Institute of Local Lore as a researcher. He became a member of the All-Union Communist Party in 1928.

Kerashev collected examples of Adyghe oral poetry, compiled folklore collections, and prepared literature textbooks. In co-authorship with A. D. Khatkov, he wrote the first three Adyghe literature textbooks for secondary schools.

He was the uncle of Adyghe philologist Zaynab Kerasheva. When his sister Aydkhan was widowed, he took her into his home and raised her two young daughters, one of whom was Zaynab. His son, Aslanbek Kerashev, is a journalist.

Tembot Kerashev died on February 8, 1988, and was buried at the New Cemetery in Maykop.

== Literary work ==
He began his publishing career in 1925 with his first short story, "Arq". He is a founder of written Adyghe literature. His published works include "Adygea - the first national", "The Shame of Mashuk" (short story collection, 1934), "The Secrets of Sariet", the novel "The Road to Happiness" (1939, Russian translation 1947), the collection of stories and novellas "The Last Shot" (1969); the novellas "The Shapsug's Daughter", "The Horse Herder's Revenge", "Abrek" (1957); the novels "Competition with a Dream" (Book 1, 1955, in Russian), "The Daughter of a Smart Mother" (1963), "Kuko" (1968), "The Lone Rider" (1973), and others.

In 1923, he translated "The Internationale" into the Adyghe language.

== Awards and honors ==
- Stalin Prize, third degree (1948) for the novel "Shambul" ("The Road to Happiness") (1940)
- Order of Lenin (September 27, 1957)
- Order of the October Revolution (August 15, 1972)
- Order of the Red Banner of Labour (July 31, 1947)
- Order of Friendship of Peoples (August 13, 1982)

== Commemoration ==
- A memorial plaque is installed in Maykop on the wall of the house where Kerashev lived (11 Krasnooktyabrskaya Street).
- The Adyghe Republican Institute of Humanitarian Research is named after him.
- The Tembot Kerashev Literary Museum operates as a branch of the National Museum of the Republic of Adygea.
- A monument to Tembot Kerashev is located at the intersection of Pushkin and Krasnooktyabrskaya streets in Maykop.
