= Adyghe Republican Institute of Humanitarian Research =

Russian research institute

T. M. Kerashev Adyghe Republican Institute of Humanitarian Research
- Адыгейский республиканский институт гуманитарных исследований имени Т. М. Керашева
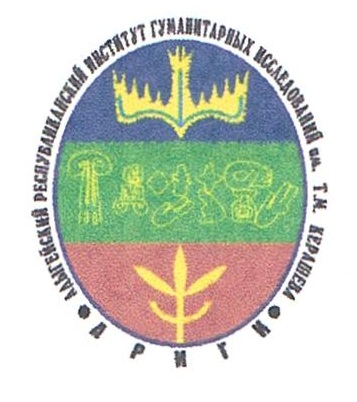
- Former names: Adyghe Scientific Research Institute of Economics, Language, Literature and History (ANII EYaLI)
- Type: Public
- Established: 1927
- Director: Adam Khuseynovich Tleuzh
- Location: 13 Krasnooktyabrskaya Street, Maykop, 385000, Russia., Maykop, Russia; 44.6047°N 40.1038°E
- Campus: 1
- Website: arigi01.ru

T. M. Kerashev Adyghe Republican Institute of Humanitarian Research (abbreviated as ARIGI; Adyghe: Гуманитар ушэтынхэмкIэ адыгэ республикэ институтэу КIэрэщэ Тембот ыцIэкIэ; Russian: Адыгейский республиканский институт гуманитарных исследований) is a Russian public scientific research institution located in Maykop, Adygea. The primary specialization of ARIGI is the research of the Adyghe ethnic group.

== History ==
The institute was initiated by scientists S. Siyukhov, I. Tsey, I. Navruzov, and D. Ashkhamaf.

- 1927: Created as the Institute of Local Lore.
- 1934: The Institute of Local Lore received the status of a Scientific Research Institute and the new name Adyghe Scientific Research Institute of Economics, Language, Literature and History (ANII EYaLI).
- 1992: Renamed the Adyghe Republican Institute of Humanitarian Research (ARIGI). The director during this period was Askhad Yusufovich Chirg.
- 2002: The institute was named after T. Kerashev.

== Scientific activity ==
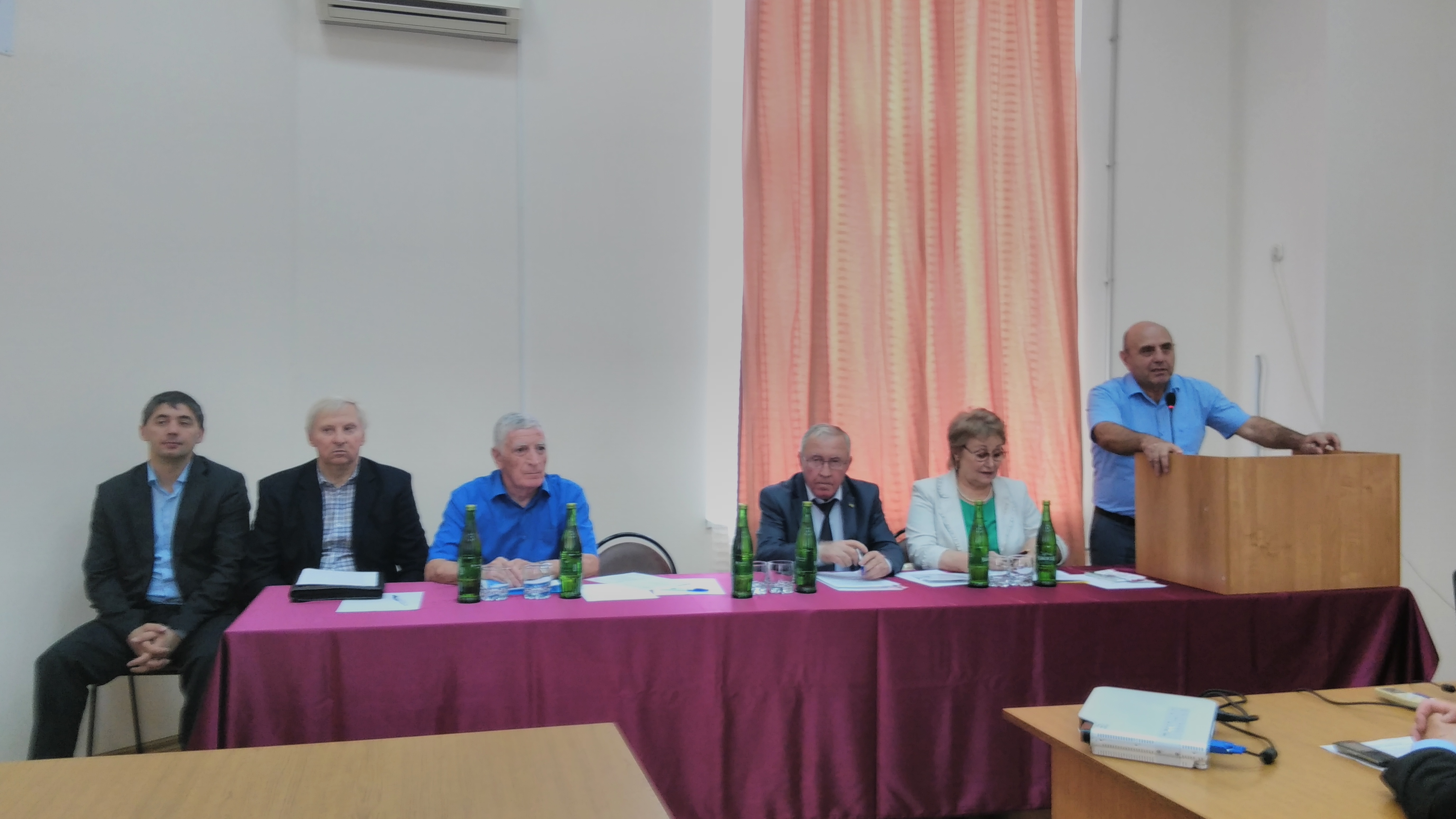
ARIGI Director A. Kh. Tleuzh at a conference. Maykop 2017.

- 1927 to 1940: Published 22 scientific works with a circulation of about 70,000 copies, and collected materials of folklore and musical works and linguistic texts.
- 1945 to 1970: Published over 100 scientific works on the history, language, and ethnography of the Adyghes.
- The main forms of ARIGI's scientific activity are the publication of scientific works and historical sources, holding conferences and other scientific events, and the work of the Academic Council.

== Institute directors ==
- February to October 1929: Makhmud Karabaturovich Khuazhev
- 1929 to 1931, 1934 to 1937: Ismail Khasanovich Baron (1903 to 1939)
- 1934 to 1936: Tembot Magometovich Kerashev
- Makhmud Dzhankhotovich Khatkov (1900 to 1984)
- 1937 to 1938: Ilya Mikhailovich Devterov
- 1939 to 1940: Maskhab Iskhakovich Bishtov
- February 10 to August 8, 1940: Khadzhimemos Ismailovich Brantov
- War period ?: Asker Yakubovich Khutov
- February 1945 to August 1947: Khabech Aslancheryevich Pchentleshev
- 1947 to 1954: Khadzhimet Dolotukovich Vodozhdokov and Medzhid Shumafovich Tuov
- 1954 to 1967: Malich Gaysovich Autlev
- 1967 to 1973: Khabech Aslancheryevich Pchentleshev
- 1973 to 1984: Fazil Aysovich Napso
- 1985 to 1986: Kim Kansovich Khutyz
- 1986 to 2000: Dzhebrail Khadzhibiramovich Mekulov
- 2000 to 2009: Askhad Yusufovich Chirg
- 2009 to 2017: Batyrbiy Makhmudovich Bersirov
- 2017 to present: Adam Khuseynovich Tleuzh

== Awards ==
In 1979, ARIGI was awarded the Order of the Badge of Honour for its research of the Adyghe language, literature, and history, and for development in education and culture in the Adyghe Autonomous Oblast.
