= Circassian flag =

National flag of the Circassians

- Unitary Flag; Blessed Banner
- Use: National flag
- Proportion: 1∶2
- Adopted: In Circassia: Created in the early 1830s, adopted in 1836
- Design: Twelve golden stars resembling a bow charged with three golden arrows on a dark green background
- Designed by: Seferbiy Zaneqo

The Circassian flag (Adyghe and Kabardian: Адыгэ нып) is the ethnic flag of the Circassians. It consists of a green field charged with twelve gold stars, nine forming an arc resembling a bow and three horizontal, also charged with three crossed arrows in the center. Every year, April 25 is celebrated as the Circassian flag day by Circassians. Aside from the Circassian diaspora, the flag is currently officially used by the Republic of Adygea of the Russian Federation as its official flag.

== Description ==
=== Symbolism and meaning ===
Two main explanations exist regarding the symbolism of the green color in the Circassian flag. The first model frames the green background and stars as Islamic symbols to represent Islam. Historical accounts, including notes by British observer J. Bell, record that the flag was associated with the Ottoman "Sancak-ı Şerif" (blessed banner), linking the green field to religious warfare under the Ottoman Caliphate. The second model is based on traditional Circassian color semantics, where green represents nature, life, vegetation, hope, eternity, and peace, acting as a contrast to red.

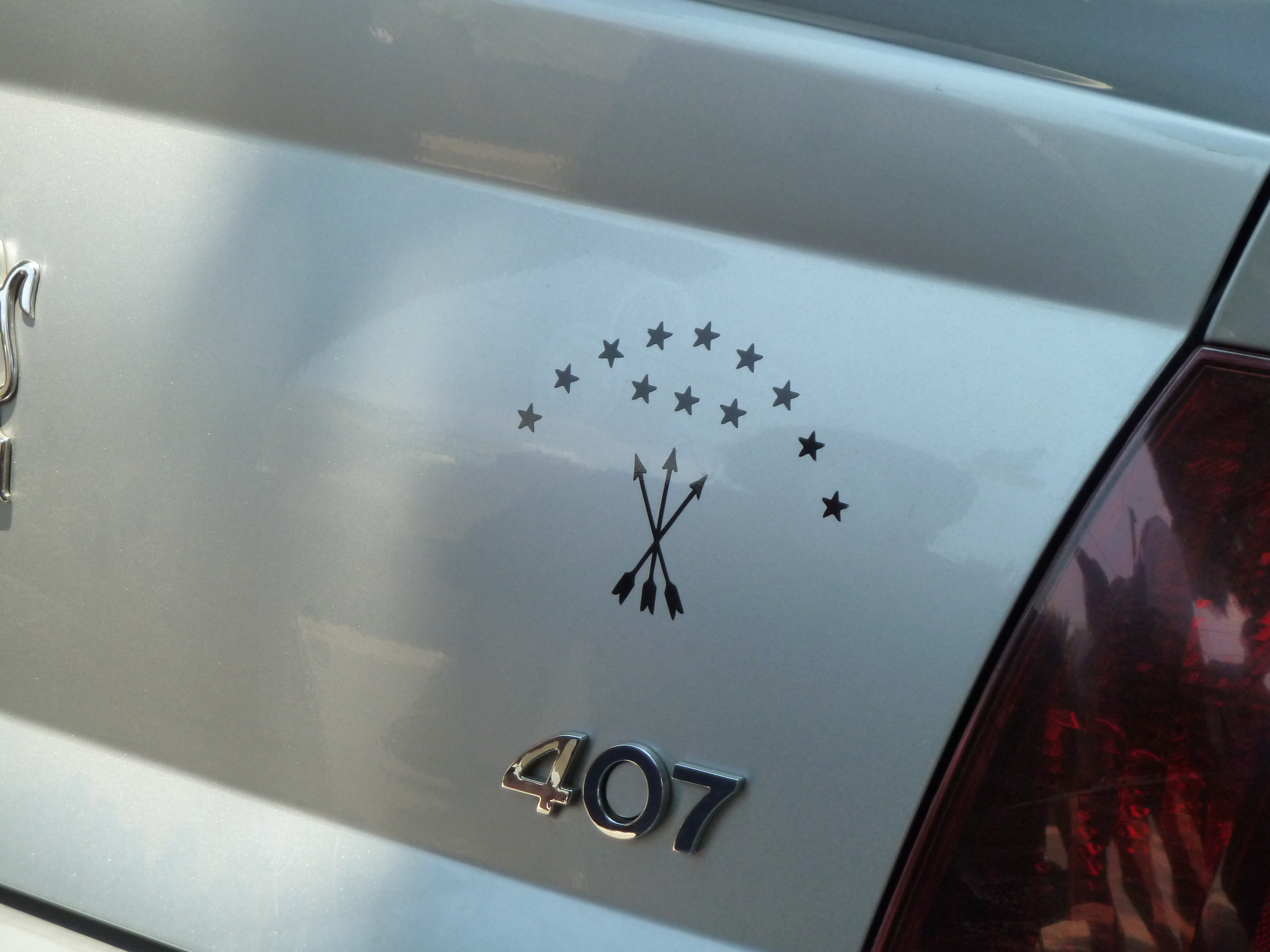
Bumper sticker of the Circassian flag design on a car in Kfar Kama, Israel.The flag design can be seen on items owned by Circassians in the diaspora, sometimes as an expression of Circassian nationalism or otherwise to let other Circassians know that they are Circassian.

The golden colour represents a bright future in peace and the plentiful harvest of grain and wheat. There are twelve stars, representing the twelve provinces of Circassia. There are three arrows, a reference to Adyghe Khabze: according to Khabze rules, in one hunt, a hunter could only shoot three arrows, if he missed, he could shoot again until he got three successful shots. He was permitted to take exactly three types of animals: one running animal, one flying animal, and one swimming animal. Because three arrows indicated a hunting trip instead of war, their presence on the flag communicates that the Circassians do not seek conflict but will defend themselves if attacked. In Circassia, three arrows came to be recognized as a symbol of peace. According to Circassian oral histories about the creation of the flag, Seferbiy Zaneqo chose that design for this purpose.

=== History and usage ===
==== Creation of the flag ====
An invasion of Circassia by Russia started in 1763, and since then, the Circassians have been fighting the Russo-Circassian War in defense of their territory. The Treaty of Adrianople was signed on 14 September 1829, which stated that the Ottoman Empire recognized Circassia as Russian territory. Most Circassian leaders believed the treaty was a hoax, a strategy of the Russians, as they believed that the Ottoman Empire would never abandon the Circassians. It was decided to send a delegation to the Ottoman sultan to examine the accuracy of the news.

Seferbiy Zaneqo was chosen as one of the delegates. Their mission was to meet with Mahmud II to clarify the matter and receive a blessing. However, the Russian ambassador Butenev started pressuring the sultan to arrest them, and following this, the other delegates returned the Circassia while Zaneqo stayed, because he had Ottoman citizenship.

The Russian ambassador, in a letter he wrote to Baron Rosen, the commander of the Caucasian Corps, stated that Zaneqo had written authorization signed by 200 Circassian nobles. James Bell also writes that Zaneqo was in Istanbul as the representative of the 12 Circassian regions.

There are no written sources that describe details about Zaneqo's flag design process. However, according to Circassian folk stories, during the time, Zaneqo was injured during a demonstration against Russian Imperialism, and was hospitalised. According to oral sources, a Circassian named Muhammad Selkhur visited him and Zaneqo presented a folded paper, and clarified that it is a prototype for a Circassian unity flag, and that during his long hospitalization, he thought considerably about a symbol for the Circassian unity and he concluded on the contents of the paper. He explained that he took inspiration from previous Circassian symbols, and that each of the twelve stars represents a Circassian tribe and they are all equally represented without prejudice. As to the crossed arrows they represent that the Circassians do not seek war, but will defend themselves when attacked. A Circassian woman from the Ottoman harem knitted the flag and sent it to Circassia.

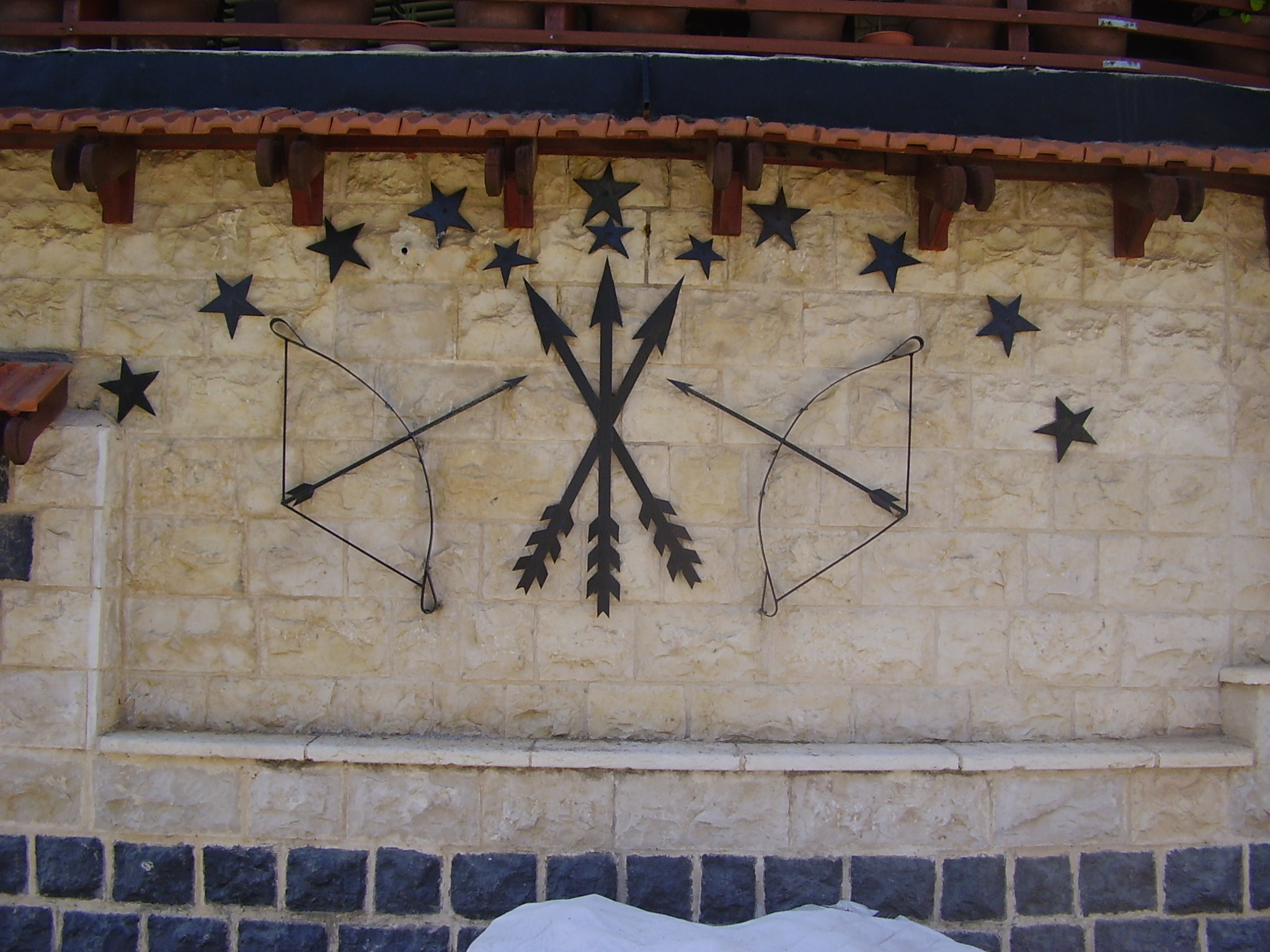
A house wall in Kfar Kama, Israel, decorated with the Circassian flag design, 2011

David Urquhart self-proclaimed to be the designer of the flag, but there is no discovered evidence for his claims. Seferbiy's father's cousin was related to Prince Hatokhshoqo Hamirza, relative to Kabardian Grandprince Jankhot Kushuk, and thus knew the arrow and star design from the Kabardian coat of arms. The flag's origin traces back to the coat of arms, indicating its design stemmed from local efforts rather than external influences. In a speech in Britain, Urquhart described the flag's elements independently of Circassian culture, revealing his lack of knowledge about their origin and meaning.

==== Adoption and usage of the flag ====
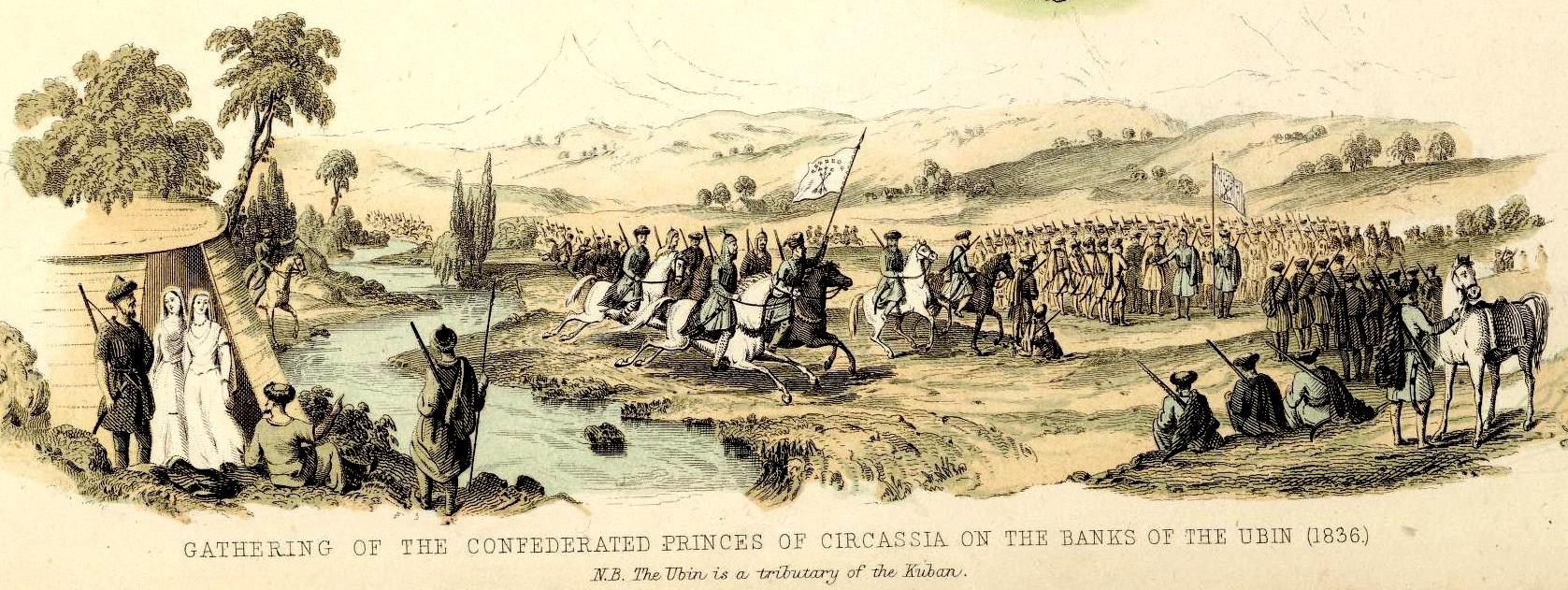
Gathering of Circassians on the banks of the Ubin River. It was drawn after the sketchs of Edmund Spencer.

In 1836, the flag was brought to Circassia by a young man named Hatajuq, a friend of Qerzech Shirikhuqo, and it was first kept in the village of Mehmet Efendi, the chief judge of the Natukhaj region. Then it was received by Nour Muhammad Haghur and taken to the banks of the Ubin River in Shapsugia. There, the leaders of all Circassian provinces gathered and accepted the flag, and commander Khirtsizhiko Ale raised the flag on Circassian soil for the first time. The flag was given the nickname Sanjak-Sherif (Holy Banner). According to the claim of the English traveler who witnessed the event, Edmund Spencer described it as follows:

On discharging our fire-arms, which always announces the arrival of a chief, numbers of gallant warriors galloped forth from the tents and thickets, and, in a few seconds, we found ourselves surrounded by hundreds of the noblest patriots in Circassia; some dressed in the simple costume of the country, and others in glittering chain armour. It was then that the valiant chief, Hirsis, Sultoune Oglou, unfurled the splendid national banner he had just received from Stamboul, wrought by the beautiful hands of a Circassian princess, occupying a high station in the Turkish empire. At the sight of the long expected national flag, thousands of swords flew in the air, and one universal long-continued shout of joy burst from the immense multitude. Never was there a greater display of enthusiasm, nor a fiercer determination exhibited by a people to defend their fatherland. Their common danger having awakened in their breasts, for the first time, a sense of the necessity of union, as the first and most necessary element to ensure success, every male throughout the whole country has sworn never to submit to the Russians, nor to enter into any commercial relation, nor hold any communication with them, under any pretence. The eternal feuds which had heretofore subsisted between chief and chief, tribe and tribe, have ceased; and those Circassians which had hitherto ravaged each other's territories, are now to be seen hand in hand, united by the closest bonds of fellowship.

Spencer also describes the meeting that followed:

In conformity with the great respect paid to age, the principal chiefs, with the elders, approached, and reverently kissed his robe, when he slowly arose from his couch, supported in the manly arms of his son, a young man of most Herculean proportions, and, after blessing the multitude, with uplifted hands, commenced his oration; an oration, however, which I do not pretend to give verbatim, as it was translated by my interpreter into German, yet, for the sake of its curiosity, I have endeavoured to preserve the outline, as far as these disadvantages would permit... ..."Where," cried the old warrior, "is my country; where are the hundreds of tents that sheltered the heads of my people; where are their flocks and herds; where their wives and little ones; and where are my people themselves? Ah, the Moscov! the fana Moscov! have scattered their dust to the four winds of heaven; and such will be your fate, oh children of Adyghei, if you sheathe your swords against the invader!

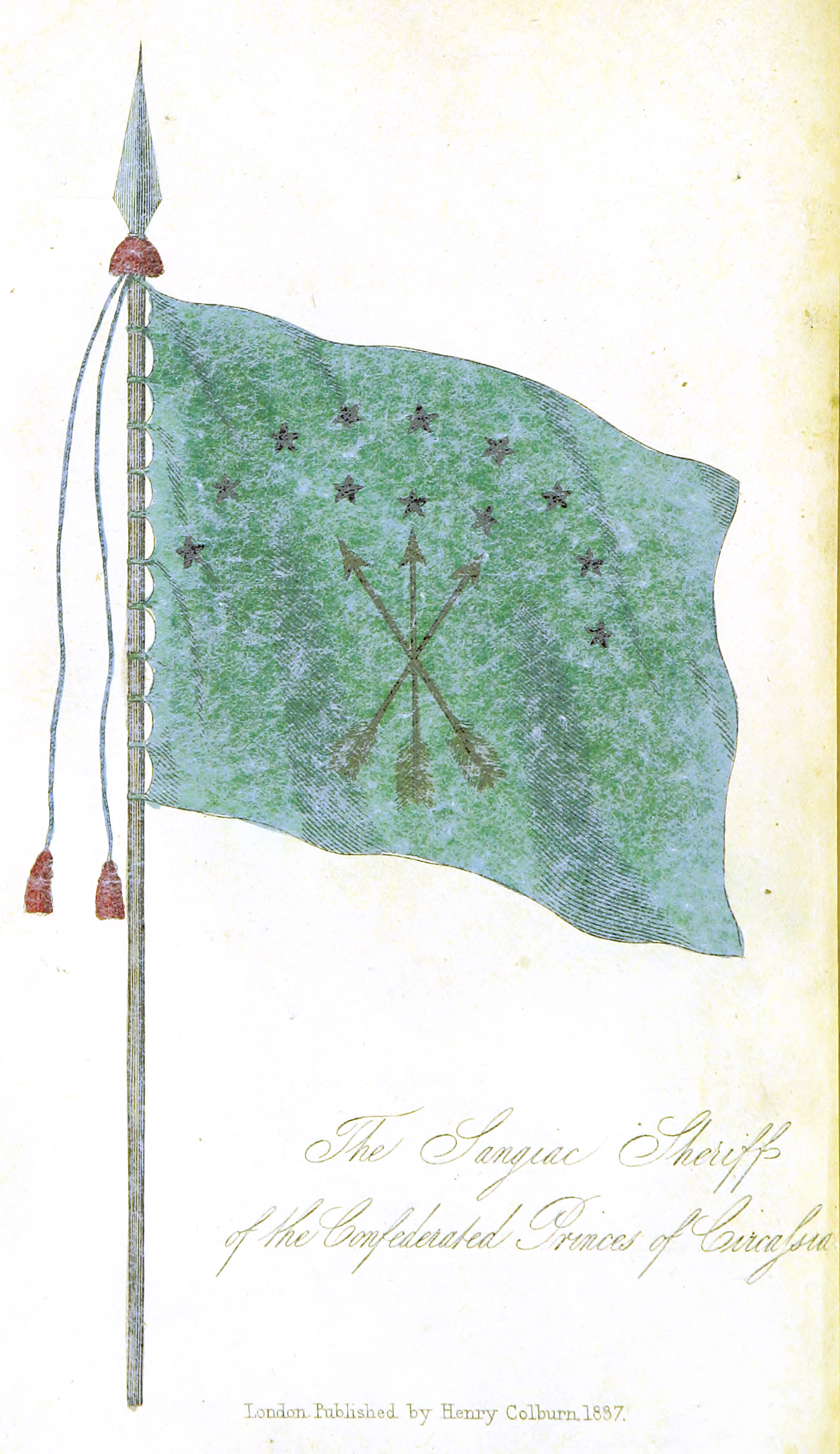
The flag adopted at the gathering, according to Spencer's book, published in 1837.

"Behold your brethren the Ingush, the Ossets, the Goudamakaris, the Avars, and the Chechens, once brave and powerful, whose swords leaped from their scabbards at the bare mention of bending their neck to a foreign yoke, what are they now? Slaves! Oh, Adyghei, the consequence of having permitted the fana Moscov a free passage through their territories. They first built houses of stone for their armed men, then robbed the deluded natives of their lands, stripped them of their weapons, and, last of all, obliged them to swell the hosts of their oppressors.

"I hear," said he, "that the great Padischah of all the seas (King of Britain), and the Indies, the terror of the fana Moscov, has tendered to you the hand of alliance. Such a mighty monarch is indeed worthy of being united with the heroic sons of the mountains; but remember your independence, and never allow a foreigner to place a yoke upon your neck. You already permitted the Osmanli to build strong houses on your coasts: what did they give you in return? War and pestilence to mow down your children; and, in the hour of peril, they fled, leaving you single-handed, to stem the torrent that flowed against you...

...Thus saying, he fell back on his couch exhausted with excitement, and was borne from the grove in deep silence, interrupted only by the smothered sobs of those whose emotions would not be controlled. Many a hardy, weather-beaten warrior strove in vain to prevent the tears from chasing each other down his sun-burnt cheeks; while others knit their brows, clenched their teeth, half-drew their sabres, and exhibited every symptom of suppressed rage and indignation...

According to James Bell, the flag continued to be kept in Judge Mehmet Efendi's house. Seferbiy viewed the Circassian flag as a symbol suited to the Circassians' historical context and distributed copies to his allies. In one case, his twin-masted ship was destroyed by a Russian detachment in January 1838, however the Circassians successfully transported the flag and gunpowder to the village of Wostighay, where Hawduqo Mansur lived.

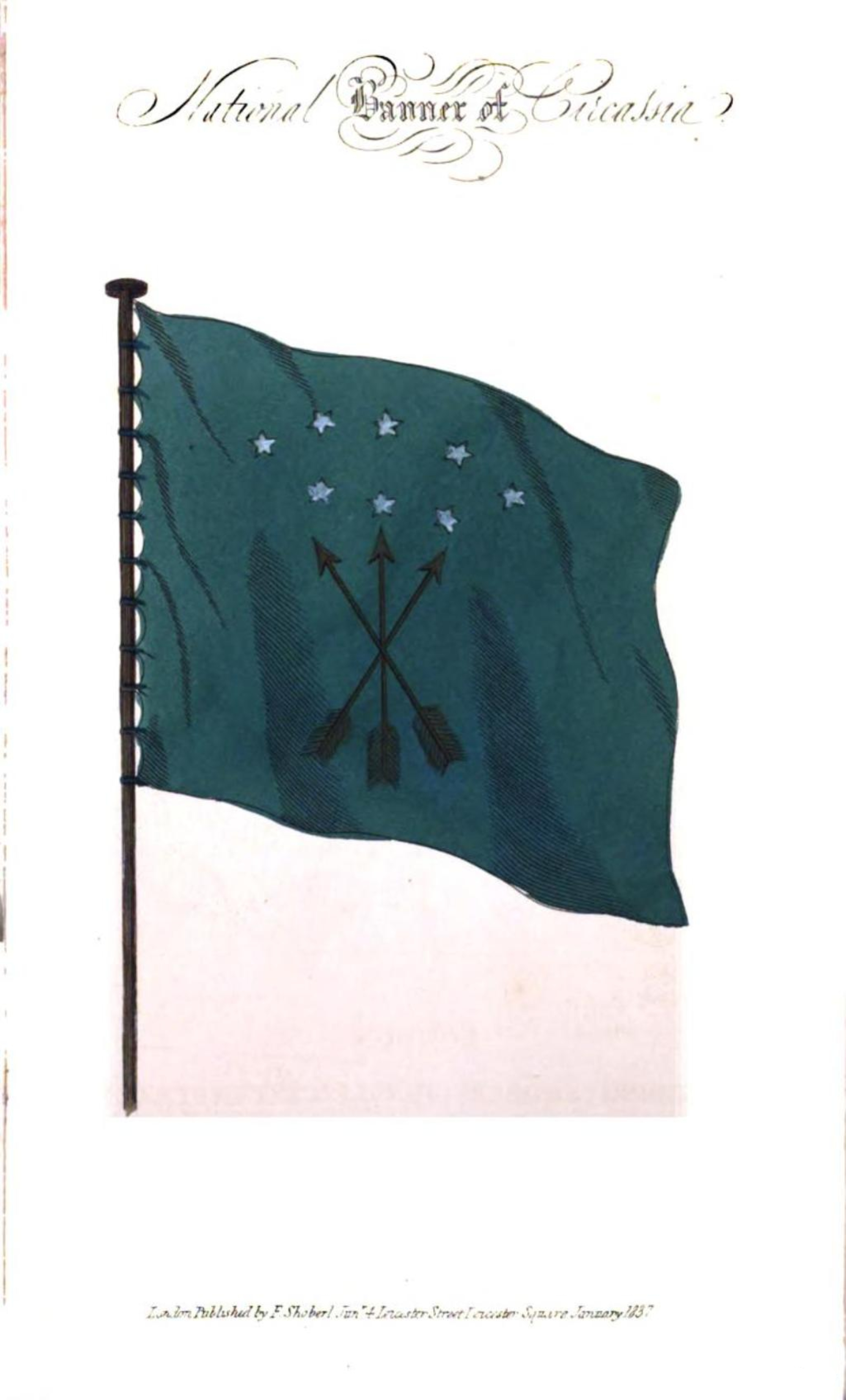
The Circassian flag, according to Urquhart, published in January 1837 in The Portfolio.

The Scottish diplomat, defender of Turkish culture in the West, and Circassian supporter David Urquhart (known as Davut Bey) attended this meeting with a letter of reference he received from Zaneqo. David Urquhart writes in his memoirs that he was involved in the design process of the flag. At that time, Zaneqo was the only person who had the authority to approve a national flag in Circassia, therefore Urquhart presented the flag at the meeting on behalf of Seferbiy. All of Urquhart's presence in Circassia was guaranteed by Zaneqo, and Urquhart could only act under the authorization given by Zaneqo. Without permission from Zaneqo, the Circassian representative in the Ottoman Empire, it was not possible to design a flag. According to another version, David Urquhart and Zaneqo designed the flag together. Thus, Seferbiy Zaneqo, through David Urquhart, ensured both the publication of the Circassian declaration of independence and the establishment of the Circassian flag.

According to Spencer, Urquhart's design featured three golden crossed arrows and several white stars on a green field. Spencer states that the stars symbolized the tribes of the confederation.

==== Revival of the flag ====
The Circassian people used this design ever since it was first adopted, including in the Russo-Circassian War. The flag is seen as one of the symbols of the Circassian nation by Circassians worldwide as well as one of the symbols of Circassian nationalism. This flag was also used by Circassians in the Circassian diaspora serving in several positions.

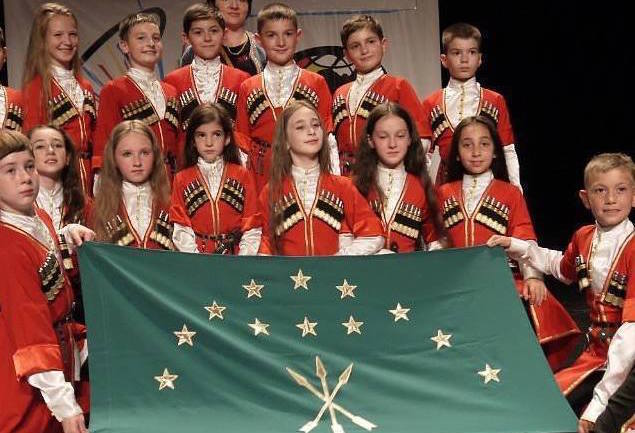
Circassian children from Maykop, Russia, with the Circassian flag, 2014

While the flag always survived among the Circassian diaspora, it lost its popularity in the Caucasus as a result of censorship during the Russian Empire and the Soviet Union, until it was repopularized by Ibrahim Nawurjan in 1989. Nawurjan, a history student at the Kabardino-Balkarian State University, discovered Edmund Spencer's book in the archives and resurrected the flag by painting it according to the description in the book. The flag was then adopted as a symbol of the Nalchik Circassian association. Nawurjan, a fervent Spartak Nalchik fan, helped popularize it among Spartak Nalchik supporters, and it later became popular among Circassians in the Caucasus again. On August 25, Nawurjan was killed on the Mamdzishha hill during the Abkhazian War, in which he voluntarily participated. A historical surviving copy of the flag was later discovered, and compared to Nawurjan's design as well as designs in the diaspora, with all designs being identical in essence.

The Republic of Adygea adopted the present-day flag in a law of March 24, 1992. The proportions are 1:2.

== Historical Circassian flags ==
=== Evolution of the current flag ===
Flag	Date	Used by	Descriptions
	17th c.–1810	High Princedom of Kabardia	The coat of arms of Kabardia. The white crescent represents Islam. The crescent is depicted inside a small red shield, which was occasionally drawn in a quiver-like form. The coat of arms first appeared in 1672 in the "Tsar's Book of Titles" alongside the arms of the "Circassian-Mountain Principalities". The symbolic meaning of the crossed arrows and stars in the arms is not recorded in historical sources.
	18th c.–1805	High Princedom of Kabardia	The first recorded flag adopted from the coat of arms. It was used as the unitary flag of East Circassia. It is recorded as "the flag of the Kabardian people" in Russian sources. The arrows and stars were sewn in golden silk. The three stars on the banner represent the three regions of Kabardia: Baksan, and Kashkhatau factions and Lesser Kabardia. In 1805, the banner was captured by Russian troops under the command of General Glazenap during a battle near the Baksan River.
	1809–1822	High Princedom of Kabardia (Jankhot Kushuk)	The flag of Grand Prince Jankhot Kushuk. The yellow-white part is removed. The spear it was attached to had Prince Jankhot's tamga at its tip. It is a green triple soft-edged swallowtail flag, featuring two golden arrows and three golden five-pointed stars positioned above and beside the crossing arrows.
	1830–1864	Circassia (Circassian Majlis)	Designed by Seferbiy Zaneqo in 1830, and was officially adopted by the Circassian Majlis in 1861. The green represents the nature and Islam. There are twelve stars, representing the twelve provinces of Circassia. The black is preserved for the arrows but the stars are golden. The arrows represent that the Circassians do not seek war, but will defend themselves when attacked. Removed after the fall of Circassia in 1864 following the Battle of Qbaada. The flag is kept in the storage of the National Museum of the Republic of Adygea under inventory number 5203.
	1836–?	Circassia	The "National Banner of Circassia", according to David Urquhart. This drawing of the Circassian flag enclosed by Urquhart in The Portfolio, in January 1837. The Portfolio was a journal that had been published in London by Urquhart.
	1836–?	Circassia	The "Sanjak Sherif", according to Edmund Spencer, the Circassian flag officially adopted in 1836, depicted in an illustration in the book of Edmund Spencer, published in 1837. However, unlike the depiction in his own book, Spencer described the flag, which he claimed Urquhart designed, as follows: "three golden arrows, crossed on a green field, over which are several white stars..." This flag was based on the illustration published by Urquhart as a template.
	1837–?	Circassia	Described by Longworth and Bell in 1837. In April and May 1837, J.A. Longworth brought the Circassian flag from Istanbul. On May 23, 1837, he reached Pshada. On May 24, 1837, Longworth made his Greek servant, Dimitri, the official standard-bearer to carry the flag. In June 1837, the flag stood at the center of the Adagum Assembly. In a letter to Russian General Veliaminov, the Circassians used this flag to show they were united.
	24 March 1992 – 7 June 2007	State Council of the Republic of Adygea	First flag of the Republic of Adygea. The design was based on the flag of Circassia, but the colours and measurements were significantly different. The wartime flag is replaced with the peacetime flag; therefore black representing fight against Russian invasion was completely removed and replaced with a golden colour, while the stars were lifted higher. The golden colour was re-purposed to represent harvest of wheat.
	7 June 2007–Current	State Council of the Republic of Adygea	Current flag of the Republic of Adygea, adopted in 2007. The measurements are closer to the original Circassian flag.
	1864–Current	None	The variant of the flag used in the Circassian diaspora.

=== Other variants of the current flag ===
The Circassian flag was used in various local variants at the same time from the 1830s until the end of the war. While the 12-star version was the standard version, designs with 7 and 8 stars were also recorded. White, black, and yellow were used for the arrows and stars, with different shades of green for the background.

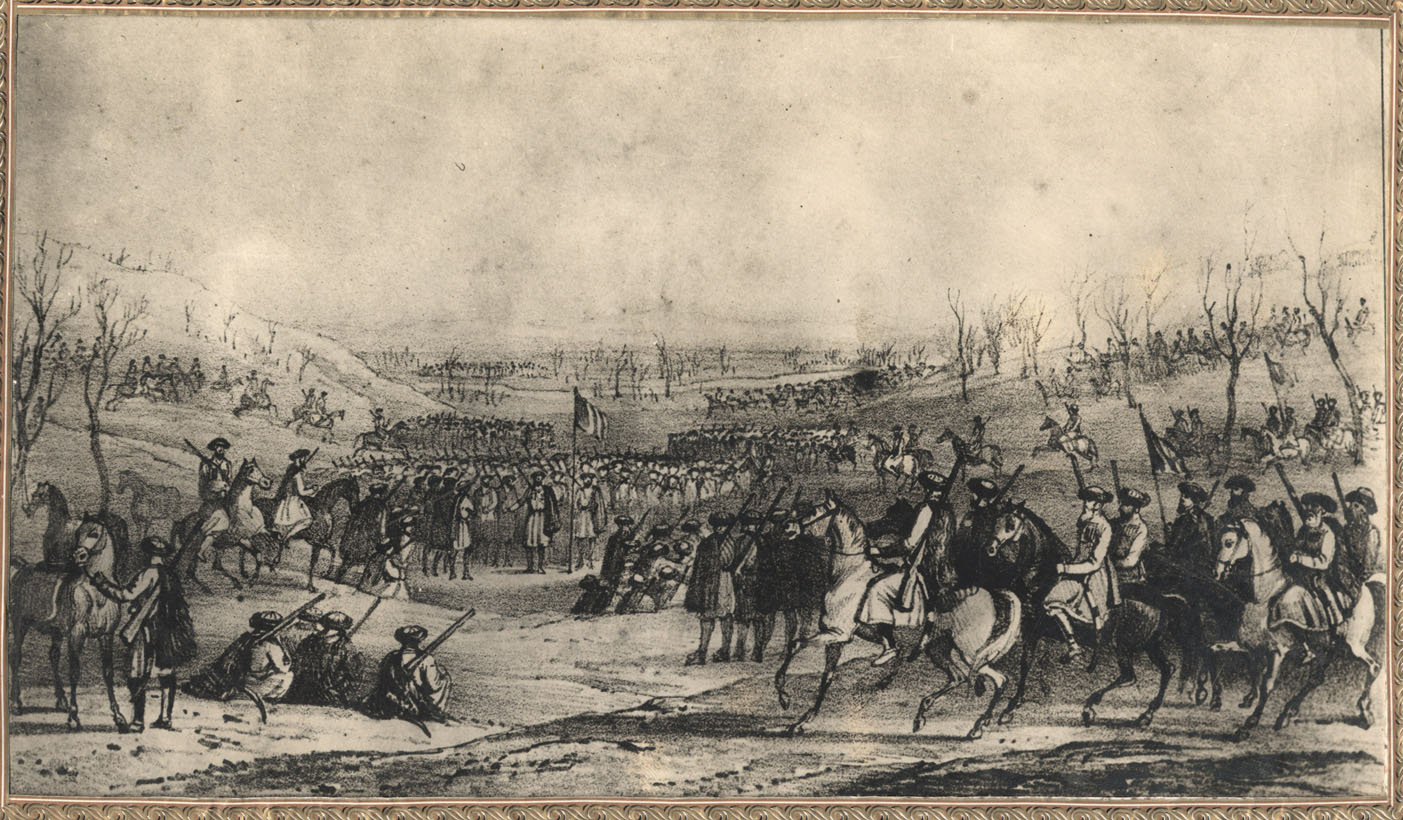
Adagum Assembly, 1837

John Longworth described the Sanjak-Sheriff featuring white arrows and stars set against a green background in 1837. During the Adagum Assembly in the same year, the Circassian flag was in the center of the assembly. It indicates that this is how banners were traditionally used at assemblies. People's Assembly of Adagum was an administrative unit, especially among the Natukhaj, Shapsugh, Abzakh and Ubykh, until the reign of Muhammad Emin.

Flag	Date	Used by	Descriptions
	1836–?	Circassia	The Deliberti "The Liberty" flag sent by David Urquhart to the Shapsug, Natukhaj, and Abzakh in June 1836. 3 pieces were sent in total. According to Urquhart, the flags were sent by William IV. It features three black arrows inside a white circle centered on the flag.
	1837 (depicted)	Circassia	Depicted in the 1837 chart "Sketch of the Coast of Circassia" from Edouard Taitbout de Marigny's book Three Voyages in the Black Sea to the Coast of Circassia. The illustration is uncolored and shows eight five-pointed light stars and three arrows.
	?–1840	Circassia	A variant of the Circassian flag. It was captured from Natukhajs by Russian troops during the Circassian assault on the Abinsk Fortress on May 26, 1840. It features eight six-pointed black stars and 3 arrows on a dark green background. The flag is kept in the storage of the National Museum of the Republic of Adygea under inventory number 5205.
	1860s	Circassia (proposed)	Proposed 1860s coat of arms for a federation of seven Circassian communities from Western Circassia, designed within the Hôtel Lambert network, featuring three crossed white arrows and seven stars on a green field. The design was derived from the Circassian national flag. During the 1863 January Uprising in Poland, this emblem was used alongside other symbols.
	?–1864	Circassia	This drawing is of the Circassian flag that David Urquhart showed to the British media. It is visually featured in publications such as The Expedition of the Chesapeak to Circassia (1864), The Circassian War As Bearing On The Polish Insurrection (1863), and Diplomatic Review. Book VII. The illustration shows seven golden five-pointed stars and three arrows on a green field.

=== Other flags used by Circassians ===
The flag culture had a wide and important usage among the Circassians. As far as known that since the Early Middle Ages, flags bearing the tamgas of families, mostly influential or aristocratic dynasties have been in use. The tamgas on the flags were usually sewn with golden silk. In addition to those used in battle and during marching, flags were also used for sports, weddings, religious rituals, graves, ceremonies, and to signal from a distance.

Each military unit within a Circassian army carried its own banner, which belonged to its commander. The main army flag was that of the supreme commander and was carried by a designated standard-bearer, who remained close to the leader during battle. Orders were signaled through specific flag movements, each signaling a different command. Due to the chaos of battle, some units were unable to perceive flag signals, so instruments such as the types of horns or drums were used to convey commands. The flags were usually accompanied by large drums which was called a Tatar word "dombaz" by the "most noble warriors of the highest rank", according to Khan-Giray.

A signaling banner (Kabardian: Аргъуажэ нып) recorded among Kabardians was tied to tall poles on mountain tops and burned to send smoke signals when enemy troops were spotted.

A negotiation flag (Adyghe: ЗэдэгущыIэ быракъ) and a truce flag (Adyghe: ЗэшIу быракъ) were utilized among the Adyghe as communicative objects to announce diplomatic discussions and ceasefires.

Two main types of banners were used in battles: clan banners, marked with tamgas representing noble families, and tribal banners, representing broader tribes. Clan banners were used by aristocratic units, while tribal banners were carried by commoner-led units. If a campaign was initiated by a public assembly, the tribal banner of the leader served as the main army flag.

In Circassian aristocratic tribes, only the lower-ranked nobles could be standard-bearers (Adyghe: бэракъыхь, бэракъзехъэ; Kabardian: сэнджакъщIэт) of the princes they served, a hereditary wartime role held by certain lower-ranked noble families. For example, the duty of being the standard-bearer of the Cherchan princes of the Bzhedugs belonged to the Hakuy family. In democratic tribes, standard-bearers were elected based only on merit. In both systems, standard-bearers has to be bravest ones, as they were expected to be alongside the commander at the front lines.

Once a respected figure among the Shapsugs, Mustafa Muk lost his reputation after retreating with the banner during the assault on the Golovinsky fortress in 1844 while leading the people's assembly. His act was seen as cowardly and traitorous, causing him to lose all his former status and become the subject of a mocking folk song composed specifically about him.

Folk songs have lyrics referencing flags. For example, on July 26, 1853, the Natukhaj and Shapsug forces launched a fierce yet unsuccessful attack on the Gostagayevskaya fortification. In Circassian songs about the battle, the line "the Natukhaj flag is being planted on the fortress" appears at the end of the song. In a song about the 1894 Druze attack on the Circassian village of Mansura in the Golan Heights, the final two verses are as follows: "The Druze half-flag was thrown to the ground in Mansura, the Circassians' glorious flag was raised high in Majdal."

When an important warrior died on a battlefield, a colorful banner with their family's tamga was placed on top of the burial mound as grave made for them. According to the Caucasus historian Vasily Potto, many grave flags were raised on tall poles in cemeteries near warrior villages.

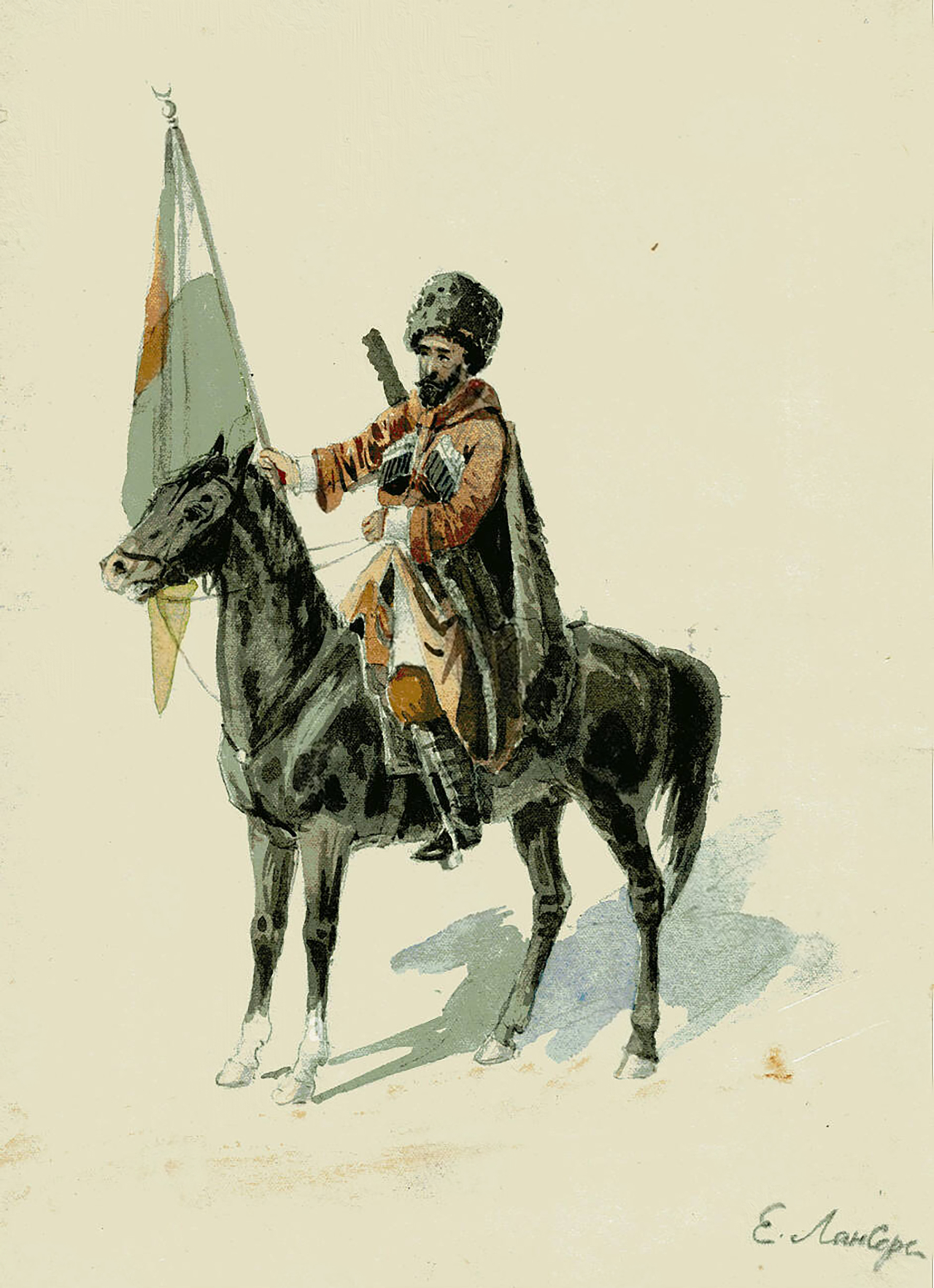
Circassian on a horse with a banner by Eugene Lanceray

In 1769, five flags were captured from the Circassians during the Battle of Kalaus in 1769. In 1785, following the defeat of the forces under Sheikh Mansur in the Battle of Tatartup, General Potemkin deemed the captured banners unworthy to present the Empress and ordered them to be burned in front of the Kabardian princes.

In 1839, the banner of Hawduqo Mansur was a large standard among a unit of 300-400 warriors. During military gatherings, various units carried their own "flags of cognizance", and banners surrounded by large numbers indicated a sovereign majority of the people instead of a single party.

In March 1840, during the Siege of Mikhailovsky, Russian cadet Iosis Miroslavsky noted that the Circassians used red victory banners. In April 1840, it was decided at a meeting near the Ubin River that each river-based area (psukh) would send 15 cavalrymen to campaigns and battles. Each cavalry unit joined the battle under a flag that was representing its own river-based community. During the Circassian assault on the Abinsk Fortress on May 26, 1840, Russian forces captured three tribal banners; two belonging to the Natukhaj and one to the Shapsug. Russian commanders in this battle preserved the flags they captured from the Circassians, unlike other flags.

A Shapsug flag from the Russo-Circassian War was a bordered banner decorated with a crescent, embroidered by the craftswoman Ayshet Thugo. The Shapsug people carried this flag during the clashes. By the 1930s, the flag was housed in a museum in Krasnodar, which was the capital of the Adyghe Autonomous Oblast. In 1936 or 1937, Khadzhebrail Sizo, the first secretary of the Shapsug district committee of the party, sent a delegation to the regional executive committee chairman, Shahancheri Hakurate, to request the transfer of the flag to Shapsugia. Hakurate questioned if the delegation could safely transport and preserve the artifact, as the district had no museum. Sizo was arrested shortly afterward during the Soviet political purges which prevented the establishment of a local museum, and the flag remained in Krasnodar. Witnesses confirmed the flag remained at the Krasnodar museum until the German invasion of the Soviet Union in 1941. During World War II, the Krasnodar museum lost various exhibits, including the flag. In 1952, researcher M. Teshev began looking for the flag at the request of local elders, but his searches at museums in Krasnodar, Rostov-on-Don, and Maykop had no results.

In wedding flags, the tamgas of the bride's and groom's families were displayed, hers on the left and his on the right, reflecting their traditional positions in the wedding. During wedding ceremonies a popular equestrian game involved riders chasing a flag-bearer to seize a bordered flag. In a competition game recorded by James Bell, riders try to take a white flag that has symbols on it from the rider who carries it. The same game appeared in ceremonies marking the return of an aristocratic child from his educator, using a green based flag. In one variation, the goal was to capture a fabricless flag made from hazelnut.

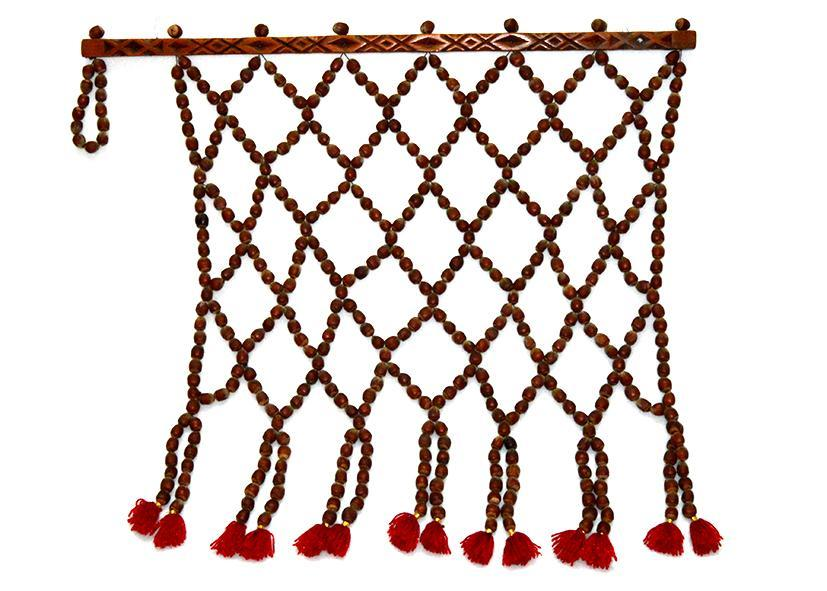
A hazelnut flag (Adyghe: дэжъые быракъ)

In the Kabardian and Abazin "return from plowing" festival (Kabardian: вакӏуэ ихьэж), another white flag (called вакӏуэ бэракъ) symbolizing nature's rebirth is raised on a 3–5 meter pole. Its raising marks the end of fieldwork and the start of a communal feast. Led by an appointed chief, the celebrations continue and competitions begins in the village after the white flag is placed in the courtyard of a preselected house. During the communal plowing/sowing season in the spring, a yellow flag was erected next to the tent of the sowing group leader. When it was time for a break, the flag would be lowered and everyone would sit down to eat.

Following the death of an important person, a black flag was traditionally hoisted on a tall pole above their family's house for three days as a sign of mourning, so that passersby would stop by to offer their condolences. A black flag was also placed at the entrance of a home affected by plague or cholera to warn passersby and help prevent the spread of disease. Among the Jilakhstaney Kabardians, when an unmarried man or woman died, a small white flag was erected in the burial chamber and decorated with beads.

When a boy was born, a white flag was placed on the house roof, door or fence. Those who saw the flag, whether they knew the family or not, would go to the courtyard and congratulate the parents or grandparents by wishing the newborn child a long and healthy life. During the wedding procession, the bride's family would hand a red flag to the head of the groom's delegation. This flag was considered proof that the bride was well-raised and honorable. During the bride-bringing ceremony or wedding celebration, a red flag was hung on the roof or a high point of the house where the celebration was taking place. If horse races were to be held during the wedding, a blue flag would be added next to the red flag to announce it. Towards the end of the wedding, it was a tradition for the children of the village to secretly "steal" the flag from the roof. The children who got the flag were usually rewarded with small gifts by the homeowners.

Most of the known Kabardian noble banners are known from pencil sketches made in the 1930s by A. V. Shukasov, a Circassian nobleman who documented them using old documents and oral accounts from Circassian elders. In 2002, historian Dr. Anatoly Akhmedovich Maksidov located these archival sketches and collaborated with artist V. N. Nefedov to publish the first color reconstructions in the journal Genealogy of the North Caucasus. The illustrations were later redrawn by artist A. Kagazezheva, who used the original sketches, historical descriptions, and Maksidov's research.

Although the existence of the banners of Western Circassian aristocrats are recorded, their specific descriptions were either never recorded or have not yet been compiled from any archival sources. James Bell was informed that the House of Abat, a noble house of Shapsug, used a "crimson" banner.

Flag	Date	Used by	Descriptions
	14th–15th century	Local rulers of "Karkūn (Coreca)"	Featured in the 1551 Al-Sharafi Atlas pinned to the Arabic text "Karkūn" (كركون). The flags in this atlas were copied from older European portolan charts (Coreca region). It is an anachronistic coastal element, and the location corresponds to modern-day Cape Idokopas.
	?–1517	Mamluk Sultanate (Burji dynasty)	The banner was a luxurious yellow silk atlas with a metallic golden crescent, used by the Circassian Mamluk rulers. On October 16, 1517, it was taken down from the citadel of Damascus and replaced with a red Ottoman flag, symbolizing the transfer of authority.
	16th c.	Zichia	The banner attributed to Zichia in a Portolan chart "Eastern Mediterranean and Black Sea, HM 35. João Freire, Portolan Atlas, Portugal (?), 1546." According to history researcher Zhiraslan Kagazezhev, the brown section at the top may represent the land and the hills, while the blue section at the bottom may symbolize the sea, possibly signifying dominance over both land and sea.
	1641	Coalition of Lesser Kabardia	The Lesser Kabardian coalition banner used by the Sholokh (from Talostan) and Mudar (from Jilakhstaney) principalities in the Battle of Malka in 1641.
	17th c.	Principality of Talostan	Banner of the Lesser Kabardian princely House of Talostan Principality. The banner was used during the Battle of Malka in 1641.
	17th c.	Lesser Kabardia (Jilakhstaney)	Flag of the Lesser Kabardia (Jilakhstaney) with the tamga's of Mudar and Akhle families. The banner was used during the Battle of Malka in 1641.
	18th c.	Principality of Hatokhshoqo	Banner of the Greater Kabardian princely House of the Hatokhshoqo (Atajuqo) Principality. At the tip of the spear to which it was attached, there was the 4th tamga of the family. The banner was captured by Russian troops in a battle near the Mount Kanzhal in the 18th century.
	18th c.	Principality of Misost	Banner of the Greater Kabardian princely House of the Misost Principality. At the tip of the spear holding the banner, there are the second tamga made from iron of the Misost family. In the second half of the 18th century, the banner was captured by Russian troops during the defeat of the Crimean Khan's headquarters in Bakhchisarai.
	18th c.	Principality of Qeytuqo	Banner of the Greater Kabardian princely House of the Qeytuqo Principality. In the second half of the 18th century, the banner was seized by Russian troops during the defeat of the Crimean Khan's headquarters in Bakhchisarai. Tamgas were usually not preferred to use on yellow and white fabric because these were mostly sewn with gold thread despite the exceptions. That's why Qeytuqo Banner has no symbols. However the tip of the spear it was attached to had the Qeytuqo tamga made of iron.
	18th c.	Qundet	Banner of the first-rank noble House of Qundet (Qudenet) in Greater Kabardia. Vassal to the Hatokhshoqo Principality. In 1797, the banner was captured by General Fabritsian's unit during a battle near the Konstantingorsk Fortress.
	19th c.	Principality of Bechmirza	Banner of the Greater Kabardian princely House of the Bechmirza Principality. The daggers without sheaths on the banner are sewn with gold. At the tip of the spear holding the banner, there was an iron tamga of the Bechmirza family. The banner was captured by Yermolov's Russian troops in 1822.
	19th c.	Principality of Mudar	Banner of the Lesser Kabardian princely House of the Mudar Principality. In 1816, the banner was captured by Russian troops during a battle near the Terek River.
	19th c.	Principality of Akhle	Banner of the Lesser Kabardian princely House of Akhle (or Alkho). The banner was used by the Lesser Kabardian cavalry detachment and fought against the French near Mozhaysk in 1812 during Napoleon’s invasion of Russia.
	19th c.	Tambiy	Banner of the first-rank noble House of Tambiy in Greater Kabardia. Vassal to the Misost Principality. It was captured by Russian troops during the 1834 raid on the village of Tambiy, which was located on the banks of the Kuban River.
	19th c.	Qozhoqo	Banner of the first-rank noble House of Qozhoqo in Greater Kabardia. Usually a blue (or in a different color) square banner featuring a central white square with the Qozhoqo tamga. The craftswoman's initials appear in the lower left, a crescent and star sit above the tamga, and tassels hang from the corners. The banner includes a Turkish-Tatar inscription خيانت آدمى بدبخت ايلر ("Betrayal makes a man unhappy") around the tamga. Recorded by ethnographer and researcher Pozhidaev, V.P. who worked in the Caucasus.
	19th c.	Anzor (Muhammad-Mirza)	Banner of the Lesser Kabardian noble Muhammad-Mirza Anzor. Vassal to the Talostan Principality. In 1849, the banner was captured during a Russian assault on the village of Gekhi in Lesser Chechnya.
	?–19th c.	Abay	Banner of the Lesser Kabardian first-rank noble House of Abay. Vassal to the Jilakhstaney.
	?–19th c.	Astemir	Banner of the Lesser Kabardian first-rank noble House of Astemir. Vassal to the Jilakhstaney, later to Bekovich-Cherkassky.
	?–19th c.	Azepsh	Banner of the Lesser Kabardian first-rank noble House of Azepsh. Vassal to the Jilakhstaney.
	?–19th c.	Bezroqo	Banner of the Lesser Kabardian first-rank noble House of Bezroqo.
	?–19th c.	Botash	Banner of the Lesser Kabardian first-rank noble House of Botash of Balkar origin. Vassal to the Talostan Principality.
	?–19th c.	Yislam	Banner of the Lesser Kabardian first-rank noble House of Islam (Yislam). Vassal to the Akhle Principality.
	?–19th c.	Yindar	Banner of the Lesser Kabardian first-rank noble House of Indar (Yindar). Vassal to the Jilakhstaney.
	?–19th c.	Yinaroqo	Banner of the Lesser Kabardian first-rank noble House of Inaroqo (Yinaroqo). Vassal to the Jilakhstaney.
	?–19th c.	Hapts	Banner of the Lesser Kabardian first-rank noble House of Hapts.
	?–19th c.	Makhsid	Banner of the Lesser Kabardian fourth-rank noble House of Makhsid.
	19th c.	Murtaza	Banner of the Lesser Kabardian second-rank noble House of Murtaza. Vassal to the Talostan Principality. The banner was captured by Yermolov's Russian troops in 1822.
	1857	Circassia	"The flag of the prophet" described in a letter written by an aide attached to "Mehemed Bey" (Janos Bangya) on February 26, 1857, at Circassian headquarters in Tuapse, published in The Illustrated London News on March 28, 1857 (extracted from the Pesth Lloyd): "The flag itself is green, and on it is a white sword with the crescent and the star." According to the writer, this flag was sent by a deputation of the Circassian Diet as the symbol of the highest power to Bangya upon his appointment as Commander-in-Chief of all Circassian forces. Circassian princes, nobles, and deputies swore on the Quran to obey him and pledged their allegiance to this sacred standard. A similar tradition of a green satin flag featuring a crescent and star is also documented by Mustafa Mahir Efendi in connection with the Bzhedug prince Alqas Hajemuqo. Mahir Efendi notes that crescent-and-star flag design was widely recognized and attributed to all Circassians (with the exception of the Kabardians).
	?–1864	Shapsugia	The flag of the Shapsug region, also known as the "Kizbech flag", was created as a unifying banner of the Shapsugs during the Russo-Circassian War. According to oral tradition, commanders Alcheri Planoqo, Nautsuk Zhane, and Tughuzhuqo Kizbech contributed to its design. It was captured by Russian troops in 1840 during the attack on Abinsk Fortress and returned in 1926 from Tbilisi to the Adyghe Autonomous Oblast through the efforts of Chairman Shahancheri Hakurate. Its return was celebrated in Afipsip with three days of festivals. In 1936, it was placed in the Adyghe National Museum. The flag is kept in the storage of the National Museum of the Republic of Adygea under inventory number 5204.
	?–1860	Natukhaj	The flag of the Natukhajs, measuring 1 × 1.4 meters, made of wild silk fabric, captured by Russian troops in 1840. It is a replica of the French flag. Above the center, on a black rectangular badge, the name "Muhammad" added on it with golden silk, representing the Islamic prophet Muhammad. The badge features four six-pointed stars positioned at the corners. On the central white field, it bears an inscription in Arabic script reading "Tamyk El Hadj Bakiy" or "Timyk Khatzkh Tsuk Hadj", believed to refer to the Natukhaj leader who used the flag during the war. Captured together with the Shapsug flag on the same day, it was placed in the Military-Historical Museum in Tbilisi in 1865. It was later returned in 1925 to the AAO, and today the flag is kept in the storage of the National Museum of the Republic of Adygea under inventory number 5205.
	19th c.	Natukhajs	A flag of the Natukhajs, measuring 24 × 30 centimeters. Located in the Hermitage Museum in Saint Petersburg.
	20th c. (recorded)	Shapsugs	A flag of the Kuban Shapsugs recorded in early 20th century. Recorded by ethnographer and researcher Pozhidaev, V.P. who worked in the Caucasus. Colors not specified.
	6 March 1917 – 30 November 1922	Congress of the North Caucasian Peoples	Flag of the Mountainous Republic of the Northern Caucasus. The seven stars represent the Caucasian people and the stripes represent harmony.

== Color scheme ==
Color scheme	Green	Gold
RAL	6002	1026
CMYK	61-0-82-39	0-0-99-1
HEX	#296912	#FDFC02
RGB	41-105-18	253-252-2

== Images ==
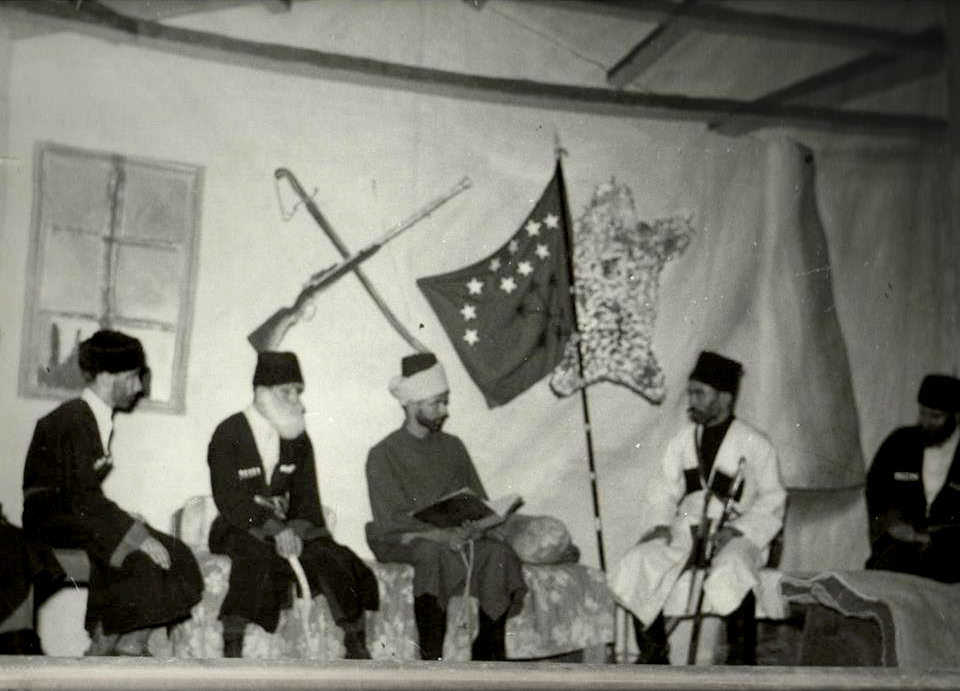
A Circassian flag in Jordan, 1954.

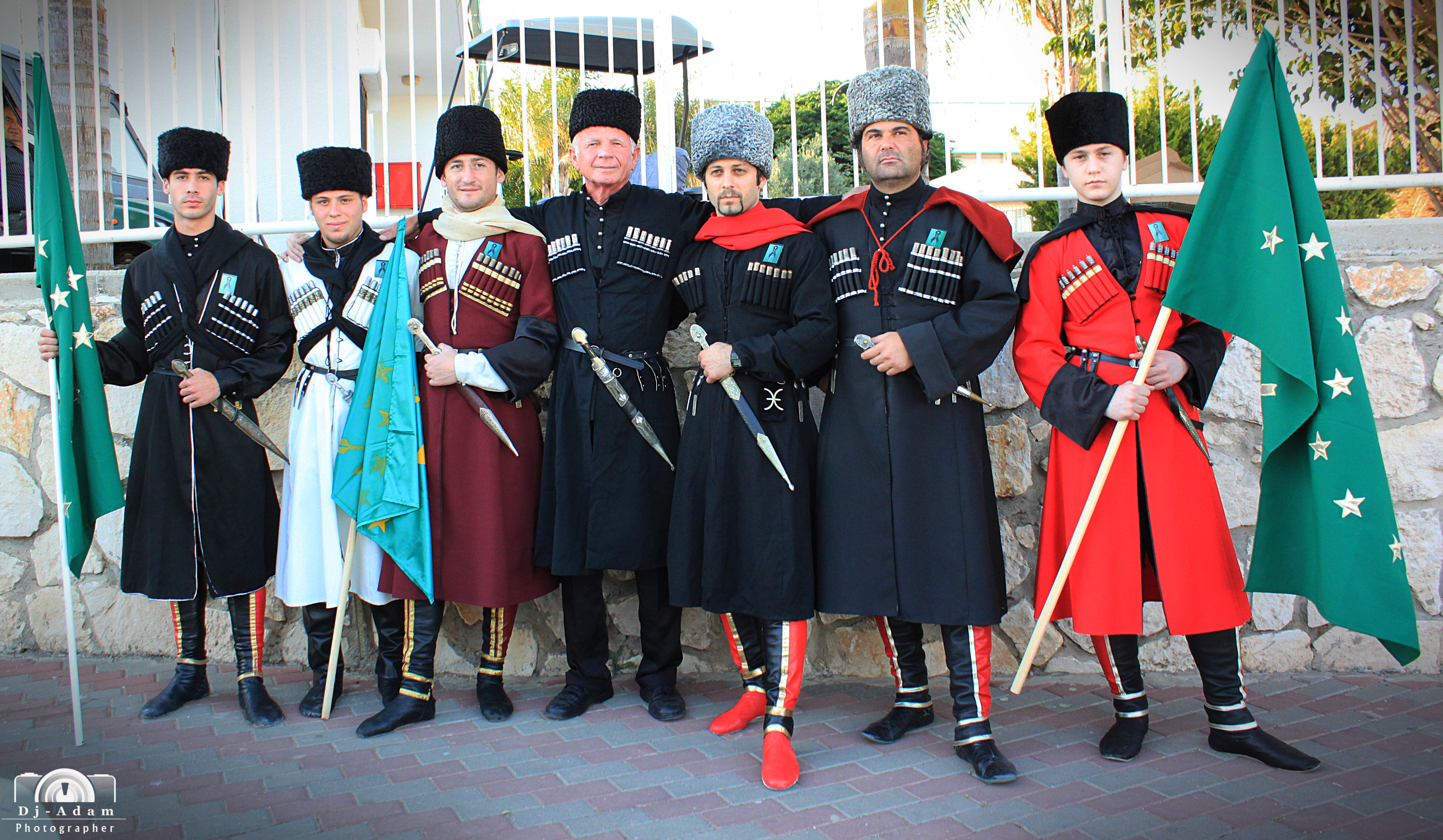
Israeli Circassians from Kfar Kama displaying the Circassian flag, 2011.

== See also ==
- Flags and coats of arms of cities, villages and districts of Adygea
- Seferbiy Zaneqo
