= Jembulat Boletuqo =

Circassian nobleman, military commander, and politician

- Болэтыкъо Джанболэт
- Seal of Jembulat Boletuqo

Prince of Princes of Circassia
- Preceded by: Mishawost Boletuqo
- Succeeded by: Sheretluqo Boletuqo
- In office 1827–1836

Grand Prince of Chemguy
- In office 1827–1836

Personal details
- Born: Unknown Chemguy, Circassia
- Died: October 1836 Prochnyi Okop, Russian Empire
- Children: Aslanbech; Kelemet
- Parent: Hatughuzhuqo Boletuqo
- House: House of Boletuqo
- Religion: Sunni Islam

Military service
- Allegiance: Circassian Confederation: Principality of Chemguy; Ottoman Empire (only nominally)
- Rank: Grand Prince
- Battles/wars: Russo-Circassian War

Jembulat Boletuqo (Adyghe: Болэтыкъо Джамболэт) was a Circassian military commander, politician, Prince of Princes of Circassia and the grand prince of the Chemguy. He was one of the most influential figures in the Russo-Circassian War. He had a big influence on the entire Trans-Kuban region. He was famous for his courage and tough will. He had great influence among all Circassians, including the Abzakhs, with whom he was associated.

Hailing from the Chemguy tribe and being the son of Hatughuzhuqo, he was born into the princely clan of the Chemguy tribe, Boletuqo, which held massive influence in the trans-kuban region.

== Biography ==
Tamga of the Boletuqo princely dynasty

=== Family name ===
The princely family Boletuqo inherited its last name and the title of “Prince of Princes” from its legendary ancestor, Boletuqo, who was famous for his “wisdom and strictness”.

=== Personality ===
His personality has invariably attracted the attention of historiographers of the Caucasian War. According to KF Stahl, he “had a tremendous influence on the entire Trans-Kuban region. He was famous for his courage, strong character and tough will".

V. A. Potto: "With fearlessness he combined an extraordinary gift of eloquence, an astute mind, an iron will ... Whole legends circulated about him, and folk bards praised his deeds in their songs."

=== Life ===
At the beginning of the 19th century, the population of the Principality of Chemguy was about 30,000 people. The eldest prince of the Boletuqo family inherited the title of the Great Prince. Since the birth of Jembulat, the political situation inside the Principality of Chemguy was highly unstable because it was situated between two great powers in the region, the Russian and Ottoman Empires.

Jembulat Boletuqo led an 800 strong cavalry force into Russian territory. Half of the detachment was of Hajjrets under the command of 18 year old Kabardian prince Ismail Kasei. Only one Cossack regiment decided to fight the rising Circassian army on October 23 at the village of Sabl on the Barsukly River. Jembulat's forces surrounded the Cossacks and killed all of them in a saber attack.

In the summer of 1825, Russian forces carried out several military operations. On August 18, General Veliaminov burned the residency of Hajji Tlam, one of the elderly supporters of the Circassian resistance in Abzakhs, and killed his entire family. On January 31, Jembulat burned down the fortress of Marevskoye as revenge.

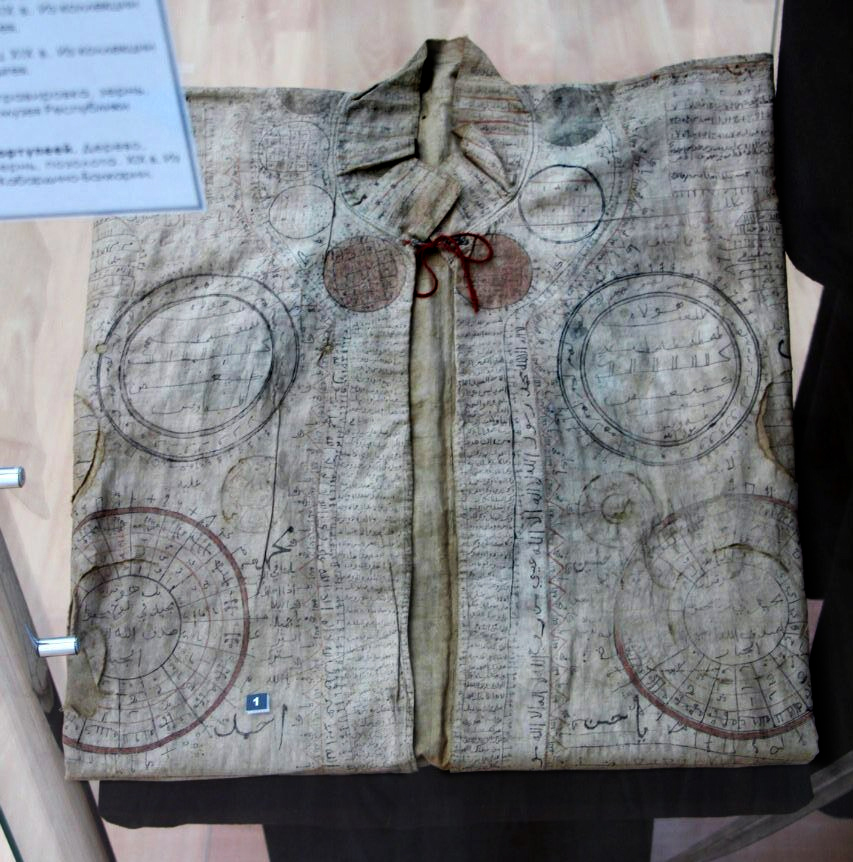
Jembulat Boletuqo's talismanic shirt. It was worn under armor.

He took part in the Russo-Turkish War (1828–1829) as an ally of the Turks and he repeatedly made devastating raids against the Russians. On June 4, 1828, Jembulat Boletuqo started his campaign into Russian lands with 2,000 cavalry under five flags of different Circassian principalities, as well as a Turkish flag as a symbol of their loyalty to Islam. On June 6, at the fortress Batalpashinsk, Jembulat attacked the Khopyor Cossack regiment, one of the biggest on the Kuban Military Line.

Jembulat left the local Russian forces behind him and moved forward. The Russians concluded that he intended to go to Kabarda in the middle of the Russian-Turkish war, and open a second front on the Terek and Sunja Rivers. Magomed-Aga, a high ranking Turk, was present in the Circassian army. Earl Paskevich, the Russian commander-in-chief in the Caucasus, ordered the 2nd Ulan division, returning from the Russia-Iran war, to move along the Georgian Military Road to cut off the route of the Circassians toward Kabarda. The 40th Eger battalion marched from Kabarda toward Jembulat. Yet, Jembulat suddenly changed his direction and headed toward the town of Georgievsk, the Russian administrative center in the Caucasus.

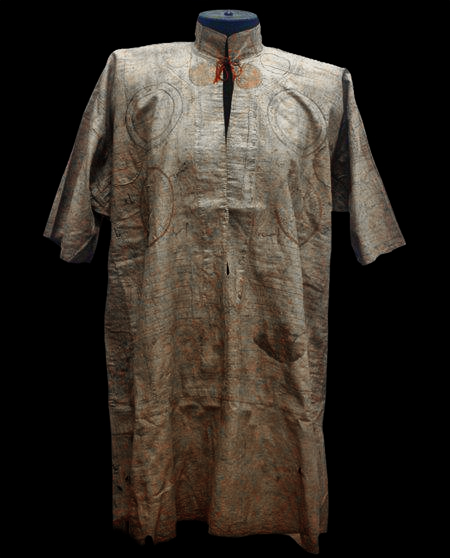
Boletuqo's talismanic shirt is at display in the National Museum of the Republic of Adygea

The Circassian army stopped on a high hill at a distance from the Marinskaya fortress. Jembulat menaced the Volzhskiy regiment's left flank with all his forces, and won the battle.

Circassian political analyst Khan-Giray observed that the situation changed for Great-Prince Jembulat “after the field marshal Paskevich left the region”. The new commander-in-chief, Baron Rosen, did not believe in human rights of the indigenous Circassians.

In 1832, he tried to help Kabardia resist against Russian occupation, but failed.

According to historian F. A. Shcherbina, during the Russo-Circassian War, when General Zass suggested defining borders with the Principality of Chemguy, Grand Prince Jembulat Boletuqo replied:

"What has this Russian general, born of a woman without trousers, devised? What border could I have? I am a son of the sun and the moon, meaning I descend from parental blood so pure that my parents can only be likened to the sun and the moon, and my ancestors' domains stretched along the Kuban, from the Laba River to the Black Sea. There is but one border for these lands: the Kuban. On one side are my lands, on the other are the Russians. Everyone should know this."

The Chemguy Grand Prince held a nominal vassal authority over all the principalities in Circassia; including Kabardians and Besleney. By the early 19th century, the confederative structure of the Principality of Chemguy included the territories of Makhosh, Yejeruqay, Ademiy and Mamkhegh. They had previously established dominance over the Abazin regions as well.

In October 1836, Grigory Zass sent Jembulat Boletuqo word that he would like to make peaceful negotiations. If he came to a Russian fortress for explanation, he would be assassinated; in case he did not come, the Russians would claim that he was a warmonger.

Boletuqo came to Zass’ residency. Zass was not there for his first visit. Zass sent him a letter and told to come at an exact date when he would certainly be in his residency. Accepting the proposal, in October 1836, on his way to the Prochnyi Okop fortress, Boletuqo was killed by a Russian sniper who was hiding in the forest on the Russian bank of the Kuban River at the intersection with the Urup River. According to a witness, upon his death, Jembulat said the name of Zass.
