= Levashov =

Levashov (masculine, Russian: Левашов) or Levashova (feminine, Russian: Левашова) is a Russian surname. Notable people with the surname include:

- Mikhail Levashov (disambiguation), several people
- Nikolai Levashov (1961–2012), Russian occultist, writer, and psychic healer
- Peter Levashov (born 1980), Russian spammer and virus creator
