= Ale Khirtsizhiqo =

Circassian military commander

Khirtsizhiqo Ale Djanchat
- Хъырцыжъыкъо Алэ Джанчат
- Born: 18th c. Shakh, Circassia
- Died: 8 October [O.S. 26 September] 1836; Circassia
- Children: Hasan; 6 male children who died in war
- Military career
- Allegiance: Circassian Confederation: Abzakh Region
- Commands: Abzakh army
- Conflicts: Russo-Circassian War

Ale Khirtsizhiqo Djanchat (Adyghe: Джанчат Хъырцыжъыкъо Алэ) (Note: Alternative spellings: Khuz-ali, Khirts Ale, Ali Khartsizov, Khartsiz Ali, Ali Tsirkhij, Ali-Karsis (Russian: Хуз-али,, Али Харцызов, Харцыз Али, Али Цирхиж, Али-Карсис), (Adyghe: Али Хъырцыжъ ыкъу, Хъырц Алэ)) was a Circassian military commander and nobleman from the Abzakh region who took part in the Russo-Circassian War.

== Biography ==
=== Early life ===
Not much is recorded about Ale's early life, as Circassians did not write down their history, and all knowledge comes from Russian sources. Sources state that he was born in the village of Shakh and belonged to the Khirtsizhiqo family of the noble Djanchat clan. His birth date is unknown, but records show he joined a campaign against the Don Cossacks as a young man in 1776.

=== Russo-Circassian War ===
==== Rise to fame ====
Khirtsizhiqo quickly became famous for his military successes. Ghish Nuh described him as follows:

The most prominent characteristics of Khirtsizhiqo Ale and his close companions are not hatred and revenge but bravery and humor. In their lives, courage and jokes are so intertwined that if you didn't know better, you'd think they were playing with the enemy. Fear never crosses their minds, nor is it seen in their actions. When they encounter a problem in achieving their goals, one of their friends always finds a way out. Khirtsizhiqo Ale is always at the forefront as a leader and commander. He manages the most challenging tasks, and his friends are always by his side. They watch him closely and never lag behind in bravery. While Ale commands his soldiers in battle, his friends tackle a significant problem in the meantime.

==== Waving the Circassian flag ====
In 1830, the Circassian flag was designed by Seferbiy Zaneqo. In 1836, when the first copy of the flag arrived in Circassia, it was received by Nur Muhammad Haghur and brought to the Gesh Valley, located in present-day Sochi. Here, the chiefs of all Circassian provinces gathered and accepted the flag, and Commander Khirtsizhiqo Ale became the first person to hoist the flag on Circassian soil.

Tamga of the Djanchat clan.

==== Hostilities with Zass ====
In 1833, Grigory Zass was appointed as the commander-in-chief of the Russo-Circassian War and arrived at the Kuban Line with full authority. Zass was infamous for his hatred of the Circassians. He boasted in letters to his friends about massacring Circassian civilians. Zass's main headquarters was in the Prochnyi Okop fortress. According to a Circassian oral story, wanting to strike a blow against Zass, Khirtsizhiqo Ale, along with his comrades from the Circassian army, attacked this base and kidnapped General Zass's daughter. Three years later, they sent a letter to Zass informing him that they would return his daughter, and they agreed on the terms and location of the exchange. Circassian mediators arrived at the agreed time and handed over the girl, dressed in Circassian attire, to her father. The girl convinced her father to pardon the Circassians, and both sides returned to their bases. However, events described in the story do not appear in Russian records.

==== Surrounded by Russian forces ====
While Khirtsizhiqo Ale and Ajdjeriyiqo Kushuk were camped in the field, they were surrounded by the Russian army. In the morning, both commanders led the charge to break the siege. Upon taking count, they saw that all their comrades were alive, but Kushuk's servant was missing. Khirtsizhiqo Ale went into the Russian forces and rescued the servant, escaping without any casualties.

=== Death ===
In September 1836, a 2,000-strong (1.200 of them had taken blood oath (Note: "Blood oath" is a tradition where participants gather in a meeting to strategize attacks against the enemy, taking a sacred vow on life and death. This oath involves bringing back the bodies of those who die in battle to their homeland and sharing the possessions of the deceased among the survivors. After the meeting, the participants attack the designated targets and return to the mountains with the loot.)) Abzakh army, including Shapsugs and Hajjret (Note: Hajjret Kabardians; the Kabardians who migrated to Western Circassia or the Caucasian Imamate after the occupation of Kabarda to continue their struggle.) Kabardians, gathered under the command of Khirtsizhiqo Ale and his son to launch a raid. General Zass's spies learned of this plan, so Zass's troops began to follow the Circassians. When they heard that the Circassians planned to raid Batalpashinskaya, Zass secretly surrounded the area. Realizing they were being followed, the Circassians suddenly changed their plan. They crossed the Kuban River with 800 men and attacked a Russian outpost near Kislovodsk On September 6, which was 100 kilometers away. They killed Russian soldiers and started to returning to their villages with 5 captives and 20 carts of loot.

Meanwhile, 200 Circassians and Nogais loyal to the Russians joined the Russian army and guided them through shortcuts to a location near the Lesser Zelenchuk River, where the Circassian forces were expected to pass. On the morning of September 8, the Circassian army was getting closer, and the Russians prepared for battle. The Circassians spotted the Russian army three kilometers away, and fighting began. The Russians were firing artillery from a hill, making it hard for the Circassians to aim. Russian snipers were positioned below the cannons. Both sides would took cover in the grass after a volley fire, reloaded their rifles, and moved toward each other. Although the Cossacks attempted to attack, they were repelled and retreated to regroup and fire again.

As the Russian line advanced in the beginning, a group of five-six Circassians finally reached a hillside rock facing the snipers, bothering the Cossacks. Among this group was Khirtsizhiqo Ale, described as a big, long gray-bearded, elderly man in fine clothing who was hitting the every shot he took. When Kornet (Mazan) Kokov was shot by Ale, they fired back at him, and Ale was hit multiple times. As he was trying to raise his rifle again, he lost his balance and dropped his gun on the rocks, falling off the cliff. After falling, he attempted to get up again, trying to break his sword and pistols against the rocks to prevent them from falling into enemy hands. Both sides recognized him. Ale's close comrades, his only son, and his son's atalik (Note: The tradition of Atalik entails entrusting a child to a reliable individual for their upbringing and education from a young age. This entrusted individual, known as an "atalik", assumes responsibility for both the personal and social development of the child. In Circassian language, it is called as 'pur' (Пӏур).) were also killed during the rifle fire.

Short before Ale's body fell, the Circassians, with rifles on their backs and swords in their mouths, rushed forward, shouting battle cries at the Cossacks. The Cossacks started to retreat in panic. A few Circassians lifted Ale's body while shouting. Meanwhile, Russian snipers came down from the cliffs and surrounded the Circassians. Very few from the surrounded managed to escape, but they managed to rescue Ale's body.

To prevent the horses from falling into enemy hands, the Circassians removed the saddles from their horses and killed them. They quickly climbed the steep slopes under rifle fire with Ale's body and gathered around their leader's corpse at the top of the hill. In the three-hour long battle, the Circassians—including Ale—lost 41 men in some sources and the fallen were buried at the same location.

According to Russian reports, the losses of the Russian army were as follows; Lieutenant Kokov was killed, 7 officers were wounded, 8 soldiers were killed, 24 soldiers were wounded, and 4 prisoners taken by the Circassians were saved.

According to the Circassian version, Khirtsizhiqo Ale was killed while fighting, not sniping. Among the Circassians, a colorful flag bearing a warrior's tamga was raised at the grave of an important warrior after his death. According to the lament of Khirtsizhiqo Ale, a woman named Nalikhan made a grave flag for Ale after he died.

== Legacy ==
=== Songs ===
There are many oral sources recorded about Khirtsizhiqo Ale. Translation of a lament about the campaign which Khirtsizhiqo Ale killed:

We are leaving the basin of the Kuban River.

We are returning to this bare hill.

We are raiding the Shenemira Fortress.

On our return, (he was) the fortress behind the cavalry.

When we look ahead, the fog is gathering.

When we look back, the horsemen are knocking each other down.

They call me "Little Danger."

As the brotherhood unit, we remain [leaderless].

At the place of water chestnuts, we search for our path.

We return with the North Star.

In this world, we could not return home together.

We will be returning to the home of the afterlife.

The phrase "to be the fortress behind" is a phrase frequently used in traditional Circassian songs. It refers to the folkloric hero positioned behind the army during its return from a campaign, providing protection against potential enemy attacks from the rear. The songs below are laments and describes the campaign in which Ale died, from the Circassian perspective.

Song	Translated yrics	Recording
Хъырцыжъыкъо Алэм Игъыбз	Lament of Khirtsizhiqo Ale	Nagarko Kazbek
Хъырцыжь Алэ Игъыбз	Lament of Khirtsizh Ale	Zamudin Guchev
Песня о Гирцыжеве	Song About Khirtsizh	Written only in Russian

Ale appears as Ali-Karsis in the novel Tricks in the Caucasus, written in 1844. The novel portrayed the situation in the Caucasus and the Tsarist administration so realistically that it was banned, and most copies were destroyed.
