= Pkhaznaab Gorge counteroffensive =

1862 Russian forces operation

Abzakh counterattack in Pkhaznaab Gorge
- Part of Russo-Circassian War
Date	30 December 1862
Location	Pkhaznaab Gorge, Kuban
Result	Circassian victory

Belligerents
Russian Empire	Circassia: Abzakhs

Commanders and leaders
Colonel Levashov	Unknown (presumably a local Abzakh leader)

Strength
3 battalions Cossack detachments	Unknown

Casualties and losses
16 wounded, 1 horse killed	Significant losses (exact numbers unknown)

Abzakh counteroffensive in Pkhaznaab Gorge was an engagement between Russian forces under the command of Colonel Levashov and the Abzakh Circassians during the Russo-Circassian War.

== Counterattack ==
On 30 December 1862, following successful raids and operations, Russian forces under Colonel Levashov began their retreat from the Griigorievskoye stronghold toward more secure positions. This retreat was part of a broader Russian strategy to pacify the Kuban region. However, as they began withdrawing, the Russian forces were met with an unexpected and powerful counterattack by the Abzakhs.

The Abzakhs, skilled in mountain and guerrilla warfare, launched their assault in the narrow Pkhaznaab Gorge. The Russian forces, already fatigued from prior engagements, were caught off guard. Taking advantage of their intimate knowledge of the terrain, the Abzakhs ambushed the Russian troops from the forests and cliffs surrounding the gorge. This sudden attack disrupted the Russian retreat, forcing the Russian forces into a temporary retreat and causing significant confusion and panic.

Despite being outnumbered, the Abzakhs effectively targeted the rear guard of the Russian column, creating enough disruption to slow the organized retreat. The Russian forces, led by Colonel Levashov, attempted to regroup, but the Abzakhs resistance continued to harass and delay their movements, compelling the Russians to abandon their planned retreat for a time.

== Outcome ==
Although the Russian forces ultimately managed to repel the Abzakhs with a combination of rifle and artillery fire, the Abzakh counterattack was a remarkable success. The Russians suffered 16 wounded soldiers and one horse killed. The Abzakhs inflicted significant damage during the brief but intense engagement, managing to destroy Russian military supplies.

The most notable outcome was the destruction of the Nedyuko-Khably (Adyghe: Нэджыкъохьабл) aul, one of the largest and wealthiest Abzakh settlements, which was set on fire by the Russian forces as part of their campaign.
