= Mikhail Levashov =

Mikhail Levashov may refer to:

- Mikhail Levashov (sailor), Russian explorer and Imperial Russian Navy officer
- Mikhail Levashov (footballer), Russian footballer
