= Ibrahim Tsey =

- Цэй Ибрахьим
- Born: January 11, 1890; Shinzhiye, Russian Empire
- Died: September 7, 1936 (aged 46); Maykop, Soviet Union
- Writing career
- Period: 1913 - 1936
- Subjects: Drama, fable

Ibrahim Salehovich Tsey (Цэй Ибрахьим), is a Circassian writer, especially known for his dramatic works. He is considered one of the pioneers of Western Circassian literature.

== Biography ==
He was born on January 11, 1890, in the village of Shinzhiye (Щынджые), present-day Republic of Adygea, into a wealthy family. The family also owned a house in Yekaterinodar. He received private tutoring in the city, where he was educated. In addition to his native Adyghe, he learned Russian, Ukrainian, Tatar, and Turkish. After passing his exams, he began his education in Yekaterinodar but soon had to leave school. During this period, he became a member of the Social Democratic Party.

In 1913, his articles "The Main Enemy – Ignorance", "Unfortunately, He Is Also an Intellectual" (Арыгущи интеллигент), and "Scenes from the Lives of North Caucasian Muslims" were published in Musul’manskaya Gazeta in St. Petersburg. His writings "What Is to Be Done?", "Pitch Darkness" (ШIункIы), and "The Abandoned" (Iахьынчъэхэр) were published in Maykopskoye Ekho between 1912 and 1916.

In 1914, his article "The Automobile", published in Musul’manskaya Gazeta, led to the confiscation of that issue and a fine of 300 rubles for the newspaper. The article criticized the attitudes of Adyghe nobles toward Russian officials.

With the October Revolution of 1917, he began his administrative career in his village. Eventually, he became one of the founders of the Mountain Peoples (Adyghe and other locals) Section of the Kuban-Black Sea Oblast Revolutionary Committee and served as its secretary.

During this period, he wrote and published the short stories "The Lonely Man" (шъхьэзакъу) and "Fatma’s Joy" in three languages: Adyghe, Russian, and Ukrainian. He also placed great emphasis on playwriting and theater. He wrote 12 dramatic works, several one-act plays, and adaptations.

In 1933, he opened the Adyghe Theatre School and became the school's director and teacher. He wrote plays, trained many students and took part in plays himself.

Ibrahim Tsey compiled and transcribed many folk tales. For example, his drama "Koch'as" (Къок1ас), the long story "The Lonely Man" (Шъхьэзакъу), and the poeticized folktale "The Rabbit’s Funeral Feast" (ТхьакIумкIахьым ихьадэIус) were all based on folklore. Additionally, his poems "Our Homeland" (Тихэгъэгу), "March of the Adyghe Oblast", and "The October Revolution and the Poor Adyghe Son" were also published.

Tsey explored the theme of the Circassian exile through the character of Tl'imaf (ЛIымаф) in "The Lonely Man", in his novel "Hantsık'u-Hace" (ХьанцIыкIу-Хьаджэ), and in his 1928 poem "Zhew" (Жъэу).

His fables were compiled under the title "Fables de Tsey İbrahim" (The Fables of İbrahim Tsey) and were published in Paris in 1939.

As the founder of Adyghe theater and the first Adyghe-language playwright, the Adyghe National Theater in Maykop was named "Ibrahim Tsey Adyghe National Theater."

== Death ==
Ibrahim Tsey died in Maykop on September 7, 1936. According to his will, he was buried in his village.
