= Abzakhs =

Circassian tribe

Abzakh
Circassian: Абдзах
- The tamgas of the historical aristocratic families of the Abzakhs and the Circassian flag

Total population
- Approximately 500,000; mostly in Turkey.

Regions with significant populations
- Turkey: 500,000

Languages
- Adyghe (Abzakh dialect)

Religion
- Sunni Islam

Related ethnic groups
- Other Circassian tribes

The Abzakh (Circassian: Абдзах, Abdzakh; Russian: абадзехи) also known as Abdzakhs or Abadzekhs are one of the twelve major Circassian tribes, representing one of the twelve stars on the green-and-gold Circassian flag. Historically, they lived in the mountainous part of the modern Russian republics of Adygea and Krasnodar Krai. Major settlements or villages were located in the river valleys Kurdzhips, Psheha, Pshish, and Psekups.

However, today the vast majority of them live in diaspora in Turkey — about 500,000 people, which are the descendants of those expelled from their homeland as a result of the Russian–Circassian War. After Kabardians, the Abzakh are the second-largest Adyghe tribe in Turkey, other diaspora countries, and in the world in general. They are also the second-largest Adyghe tribe in Israel (after Shapsugs), largest in Jordan, and the sixth-largest in Russia. The Abzakhs are not to be confused with the Abkhazians or the Abaza, yet the naming "abadz'ekh" in Circassian language means "the people who live under the Abazas", but they are different in language.

== History ==
Before the Caucasian War, Abzakhs inhabited the northern slope of the Caucasus mountain range, near the land of the Shapsug tribe. They were grouped into highland and lowland Abzakhs and favored close relations with the Ubykhs, whom they practically regarded as their own kin.

In 1834, together with the Shapsugs and the Nathukajs, they swore an oath to fight against the Russians. The Abzakhs were reluctant to join non-Circassian commanders, which is why Muhammad Amin failed to win over the Abzakh, most of whom backed Seferbiy Zaneqo.

After the Caucasian war, most Abzakhs (and other tribes) were deported to the Ottoman Empire, the remaining Abzakhs were relocated to the present-day steppe Shovgenovsky District in Adygea.

== Culture ==
The Abzakh tribe was traditionally divided into nine companies, managed by elected elders. In discussing and resolving important issues elders agreed in a general meeting. Among Circassians, Abzakhs were considered the most warlike.

The Abzakh tribe didn't have a prince class, but had a noble class, which they hadn't absolute authority over the people. The Abzakh tribe was referred to as a republic in the sources. Recorded noble families as follows: Anchoq, Beshuq, Djanchat, Ashnazh, Beta, Daur, Guta, Yinemuq / Yenemuq, Yedij, Kuba, Kobl, Tlish, Tsey, Hatqo, Khushteqo, Nedjuq.

Circassians, including the Abzakhs, frequently used the tamga culture. The Abzakh tribe engaged in arable farming and horticulture, and kept many animals, especially prized horses. In the mountains, the Abzakh mined copper, iron, lead, and silver.

Since the early 19th century, their dominant religion is Sunni Islam.

== Language ==
The Abzakh people speak a sub-dialect (Adyghe: Абдзахэбзэ) of the West Adyghe dialect of the Circassian language.

== Israel ==
About 1,123 Abzakh people live in the Rehaniya, in Galilee (Northern District, Israel), where there is an Adyghe museum.

In 1958, Abzakhs (and other Adyghe tribes) of Israel were allowed to enter military service, which gave them a number of privileges. In Israel, the Abzakh are the second largest Adyghe tribe, after the Shapsug.

== Notable people ==
- Hulusi Salih Pasha (1885–1939); Ottoman Grand Vizier (1920), admiral, the first Minister of Navy of the Republic of Turkey
- Khirtsizhiqo Ale (?-1836); Military commander
- Hasan Bish; Abzakh representative of Circassian Parliament.
- Wumar Bersey (1807-?); Writer, poem, fabulist, translator and teacher.
- Hasan Bish; Abdzakh Representative of Circassian Majlis
- Hatirbay Tsey; Delegate of the Circassian Parliament during negotiations with Tsar Alexander II in 1861 and a military chieftain
- Aslanbech Hajemuqo Pshimaf; Delegate of the Circassian Parliament and a noble
- Ibrahim Salehovich Tsey (1890-1936); One of the founders of Adyghe literature and a writer
- Jawdat Said (1931-2022); Islamic scholar

== See also ==
Other Circassian tribes:

- Besleney
- Bzhedug
- Hatuqwai
- Kabardian
- Mamkhegh
- Natukhai
- Shapsug
- Temirgoy
- Ubykh
- Yegeruqwai
- Zhaney
