= National Museum of the Republic of Adygea =

Museum in Russia

- Адыгэ Республикэм и Лъэпкъ музей (Adyghe); Национальный музей Республики Адыгея (Russian)
- Location within Adygea
- Established: 1926
- Location: Sovetskaya Street, 229, Maykop, Russia
- Coordinates: 44°36′22.27″N 40°5′55.81″E
- Visitors: 18,695
- Director: Fatima Kadyrbechevna Dzhigunova
- Website: adyg-museum.ru

The National Museum of the Republic of Adygea (Adyghe: Адыгэ Республикэм и Лъэпкъ музей; Russian: Национальный музей Республики Адыгея) is a museum located in the city of Maykop, Adygea. It has also has another branch: the T. Kerashev Literary Museum.

== History ==
The museum was created in 1926 as the Adyghe Historical-Ethnographic Museum in the city of Krasnodar at the initiative of the Society for the Study of the Adyghe Autonomous Oblast. The founder, first director, and sole employee until 1935 was Ibrahim Navruzov.

For a long time, the Adyghe museum did not have a permanent address. In 1936, the capital of the Adyghe Autonomous Oblast was moved to Maykop, and subsequently, in 1938, the museum (then called the Adyghe Regional Museum of Local Lore) moved to the new administrative center. It merged with the Maykop District Museum of Nature, which had been established in 1909.

In 1937, Navruzov was dismissed from his post as director. The following year, he was arrested as part of Stalinist repressions against "bourgeois-nationalist organizations", and he died in a camp in 1943. The collections assembled by Navruzov remained unclaimed and were destroyed during the occupation of the region by Nazi Germany troops, which took place from August 1942 to January 1943. In May 1950, the museum moved into a new building on Pervomayskaya Street, which welcomed its first visitors in 1954.

From 1988 to 2007, the museum was directed by the Adyghe activist Almir Abregov (who served as deputy from 1989 to 1990 and chairman from 1991 to 1994 of the Council of the socio-political movement "Adyghe Khase" of the Republic of Adygea). Thanks to his activities in the early 1990s, the museum acted as one of the centers of Circassian nationalism. Abregov pushed the republic's authorities, held more moderate positions, toward a more decisive defense of Adyghe national interests. Among other things, the museum held an exhibition dedicated to political repressions, which caused objections from government representatives but continued its work. After Abregov's departure, the museum leadership did not play such an active role in the political life of the republic.

On March 23, 1993, by a decree of the Government of Adygea, the museum was transformed into the National Museum of the Republic of Adygea, and simultaneously moved to a specially constructed building. In 2001, the first ethnographic exposition "Culture and Life of the Adyghe People in the Late 18th – Early 19th Centuries" was opened, comprising two halls. In May 2005, a permanent exposition "Adygea During the Great Patriotic War of 1941–1945" was created.

For the 15th anniversary of the formation of the Republic of Adygea (October 5, 2006), the opening of the archeology exhibition hall "The Early Bronze Age in the Territory of the Republic of Adygea" took place. As part of this event, on the initiative of the Ministry of Culture of the Republic of Adygea, a fragment of a slab with a pictographic inscription, found in the 12th–13th centuries during excavations at the Maikop kurgan, was transported to the National Museum of the Republic of Adygea from the Peter the Great Museum of Anthropology and Ethnography (Kunstkamera) of the RAS.

In 2011, with the active cooperation of government bodies, industrial enterprises, and public organizations, the exhibition "20 Years of the Republic of Adygea" was organized in the museum, reflecting the achievements and prospects of the republic's development in the political and socio-economic spheres, as well as in education, medicine, and culture. Separate exhibitions are dedicated to outstanding cultural figures of the republic — R. Sheozheva, K. Tletsuruk, and others. Museum funds are also used in the implementation of the adaptation program for Adyghe repatriates.

In 2014, the museum, together with the ethnography department of the branch of the Museum of the History of the Resort City of Sochi in the settlement of Lazarevskoye, opened the exhibition project "Traditional Culture of the Adyghe" in the Sochi Olympic Park. The exhibition was aimed at forming ideas about the evolution of the worldview and mental characteristics of the Adyghe people, and the nature of economic and cultural relations within the ethnic group and with other peoples.

== Exhibition areas and collections ==
The National Museum houses collections of clothing, musical instruments, porcelain, precious stones, coins, etc., as well as sculpture, graphics, fine art of the 20th–21st centuries, decorative and applied arts, art of Eastern countries, natural science, historical-household, and ethnographic collections and much more.

It is the only museum in Russia that has an Adyghe diaspora sector dedicated to studying the life of the Adyghe (Circassians) living abroad; about 1,500 items related to the history of the Circassian diaspora have been collected.

Museum areas: Exhibition space — 2,130 m^{2}, temporary exhibitions — 150 m^{2}, storage facilities — 750 m^{2}, park area — 1.5 hectares. Total exhibits — 294,932, of which 211,741 are items of the main fund. Number of employees: 80, including 47 researchers. The museum participates in the "Night of Museums" event.

== Directors ==
- 1926–1937: Ibrahim Navruzov
- 1988–2007: Almir Abregov
- 2008–present: Fatima Kadyrbechevna Dzhigunova

== Publications ==
- Collection of materials and scientific articles of the National Museum of the Republic of Adygea. Issue I / ed. board: Garazha N. A., Dzhigunova F. K., Shovgenova N. Z. — Maykop: Publisher A. A. Grigorenko, 2010. — 152 p.
- Catalog "Exhibition of Fine Art of Professional Artists and Masters of Decorative and Applied Arts 'World of the Adyghe'". — Maykop, 2004.
