= Siege of Velyaminovsky =

1840 siege

Coordinates: 44°05′48″N 39°04′19″E

Siege of Velyaminovskoe
- Part of Russo-Circassian War
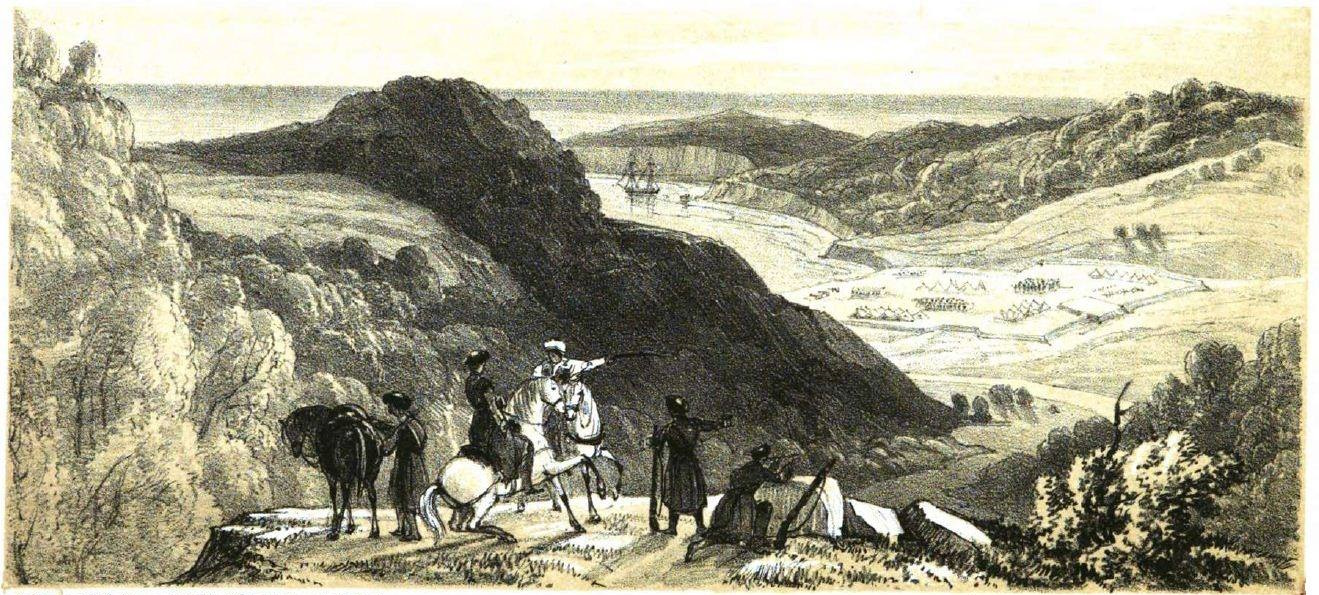
- Qizbech and his men planning an attack on the Russian Velyaminovsky Fort in Tuapse, Circassian Coast, 1839.
Date	12 March 1840
Location	Velyaminovsky Fort, Black Sea Coastline
Result	Circassian victory

Belligerents
Circassia	Russia

Commanders and leaders
Qizbech Tughuzhuqo (DOW)? Ismail Berzeg; Qerzech Shirikhuqo; Hawduqo Mansur; Beslan Berzeg; Haji Ismail	(Russian Empire) Captain Papakhristo † (Russian Empire) A. S. Khudobashev (POW)

Strength
7,000 Circassians	~400; 6 cannons 4 mortars

Casualties and losses
700	~400

The Siege of Velyaminovsky (Adyghe: ТIопсэ зау; Russian: Оборона Вельяминовского форта) took place on the night of 12 March 1840 (29 February O.S.) during the Russo-Circassian War. The Russian fort had been built in Circassia two years earlier to establish Russian control. The Circassians attacked the fort after the morning prayer, and seven and a half hours later, the fort fell.

== Background ==
Since the early 1830s, the Russians had been landing on the Black Sea coast of Circassia and building fortifications. Velyaminovsky Fort was built in 1838 on the eastern shore of the Black Sea, at the mouth of the Tuapse River, 150 meters from the coastline. It was part of the Black Sea Coastal Line.

Qizbech Tughuzhuqo aimed to capture this fort. He had scouted the fort and its surroundings prior to the siege. According to Gavrilov, a Russian soldier held captive by the Circassians for 7 years, the Circassians began gathering 2 weeks before the siege. According to him, they numbered 8 thousand in total, "from young to old." Other sources range from 7 to 12 thousand. Russian agents had given advance warning of the attack. At the end of February, many Circassians approached the Velyaminovsky fort and, through an envoy, demanded that the Russians surrender. If the Russians did not surrender, they threatened to "capture the fortification and slaughter the garrison to the last man." The military commander of the fort, Captain Papakhristo, refused to surrender and stated that they would fight to the end. In the military council before the attack, the Circassians decided not to evacuate their own dead and wounded until they had completely captured the fortification.

== The siege ==
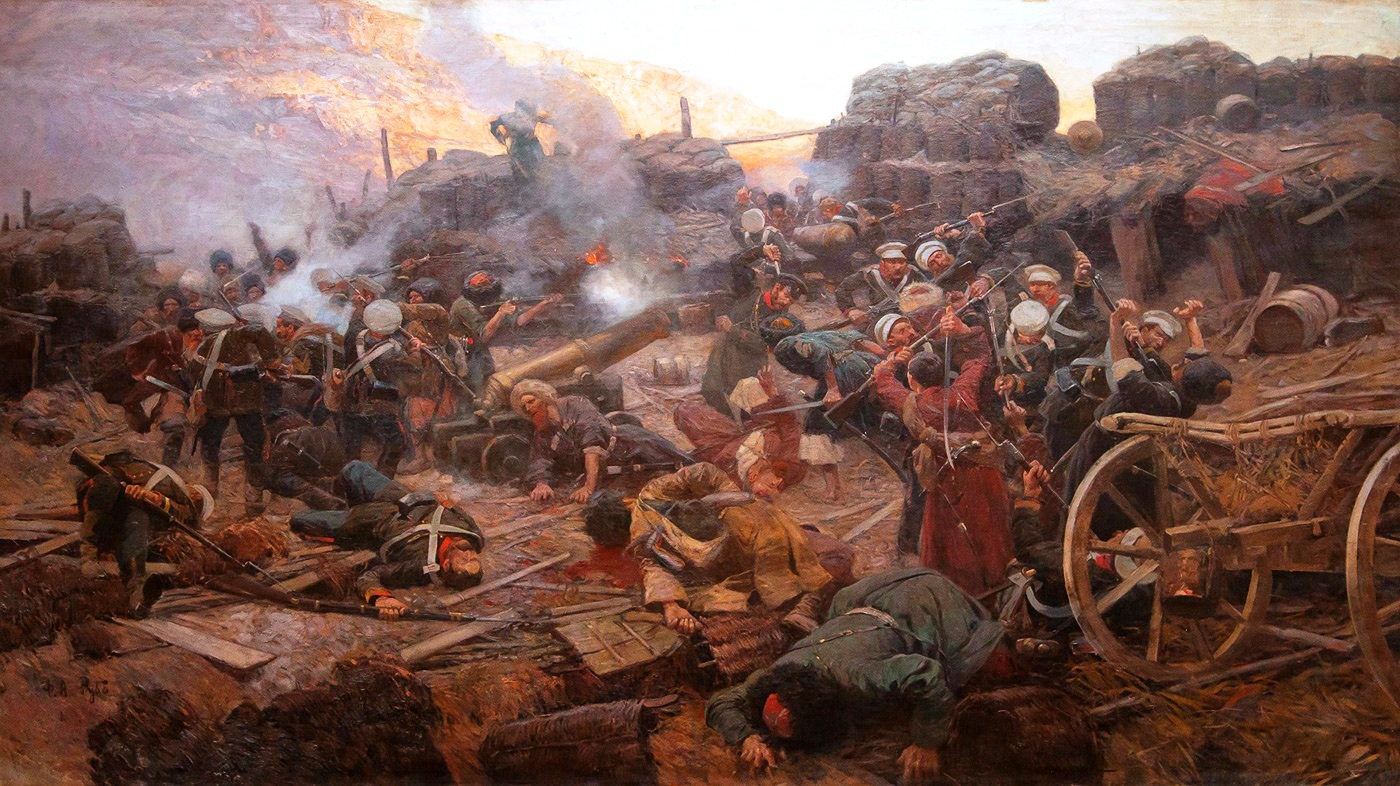
"Battle in the Mountains" scene from the Caucasian War. Roubaud F., 1890

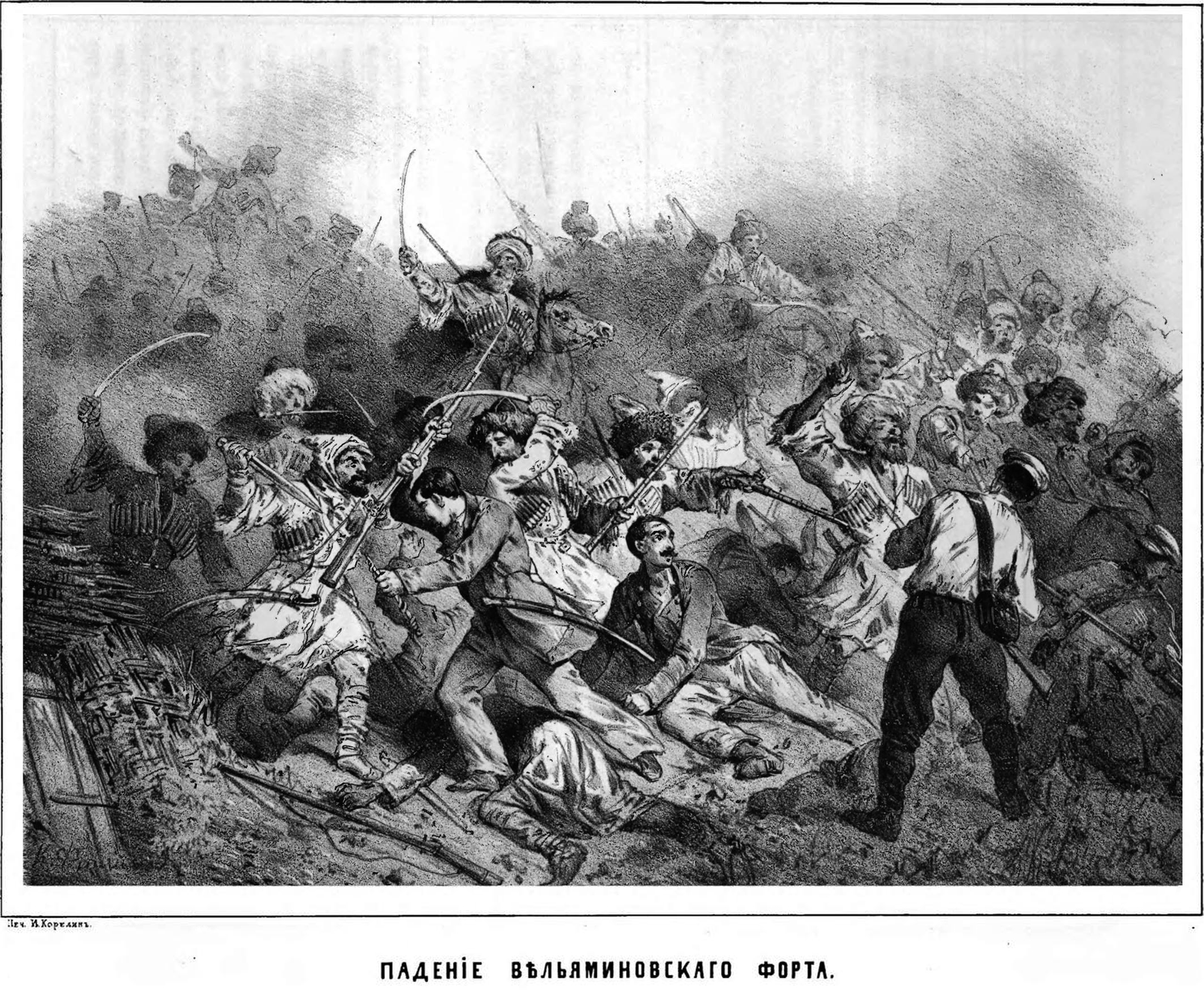
Qizbech leads the siege on Velyaminovsky

On the night of 12 March 1840, the Circassians secretly approached the Yekaterininskaya valley and deployed there, ready for battle. Near dawn, a group of Circassians secretly infiltrated the ship supplying goods to the fort and set it on fire. Not understanding what was happening, the enemy soldiers in the fort began running towards the ship. At that moment, Qizbech Tughuzhuqo and his army, hiding in the forest, sprang out and attacked the Russian troops. Then, the Circassians launched an attack, rushing in from different directions. Qizbech Tughuzhuqo gave an order to his army:

Kill those in the very front first. They fight for fame, for position, for rank, for medals. Those behind them are just ordinary wretches who are forced to fight for money.

Some of the Circassians broke through the gates and entered the fortification. The 1st Navagin detachment stationed there sounded the alarm and, led by their commander A. S. Khudobashev, launched a bayonet charge. The 2nd Detachment, which was in the church at the time, rushed to help, and together they managed to push the Circassians out.

Meanwhile, other Circassians who had broken through and scattered the defense attacked the bastions and walls simultaneously from different sides under rifle fire. Following close-quarters combat, the Circassian attacks were repelled on three sides, but on one side, they managed to breach the fort. After this, the defenders on the other side also fell, and they set the garrison on fire.

At this time, the remaining Russian troops ran to a distant blockhouse and locked themselves inside. The Circassians surrounded the blockhouse on all four sides and demanded their surrender. The Russians responded by firing. After this, the Circassians surrounded the blockhouse with brushwood and once again asked them to surrender. They then set the blockhouse on fire. As the flames rose, some shouted "we will not surrender!", while others were killed by the Circassians. After a 2-hour battle, the entire unit was killed.

Meanwhile, commander Papakhristo, holding a bomb, ran to blow up the powder magazine, but was killed by the Circassians before he could reach it. Another Russian soldier, Rumyanchenkov, made a similar attempt but failed.

Seeing that the Circassians had breached the defenses on the walls, Lieutenant Khudobashev and his soldiers retreated to shelter No. 3. The Circassians opened fire on it. Having run out of all their ammunition, the Navagins engaged in hand-to-hand combat with the Circassians. Wounded in the stomach, Khudobashev continued to direct the battle.

Around 3 p.m., the resistance of the defenders was broken. Russian commander Khudobashev and 15 of his men were taken prisoner by the Circassians, but they were later returned to the Russians without ransom due to the respect the Circassians had for Khudobashev's bravery. 20 other Russians were also taken prisoner. Qizbech Tughuzhuqo, who was severely wounded during the siege, subsequently died from these wounds. According to another view, he did not die in this siege, but died earlier or later. According to oral sources, two more people were buried next to his grave, in accordance with his will. His final words are recorded:

I am content with the life I have lived. What I have witnessed here today is a great honor and immense happiness for me. With God's will, the work we have started will not remain unfinished. My life was not in vain. The Circassians have united. They have become one heart, one fist. The victory we have won here today is one of the greatest victories. I take the honor of swinging my sword in such a great victory. I have done all I could. My time has come. Without turning back from my cause, I am going to meet Allah as a martyr. The sea is salty, but the fish living in that sea has no trace of salt in its body. Do not be deceived by worldly goods and make a mistake. They will do everything they can to deceive you, offering you wealth and possessions. We must live our religion and customs in purity, without abandoning our ablution and prayer. They will ensure that we live as a nation. If our lands are occupied by the infidels, our sacred cause will not be realized. You see the lives of our brothers deceived by the infidels. They coveted worldly goods and abandoned Allah. Do not fear death, for it will come to everyone.

The Circassians later stated the following in letters written to James Bell:

Old Friend - After the capture of the fort of Waia, on Thursday, the 8th of the month of Muharram, after the morning prayer, we attacked the fort of Toapse. Following a battle that lasted seven and a half hours, the place fell into our hands. For your information.

...

A week after the above date, the fort of Abun in Shapsug was captured. Thanks be to Almighty God!

...

Shekir Efendi, Barzek Haji Dakhum-oku, Hussein Bey, and all our citizens send you their greetings.

— Hassan Bey
