= Siege of Mikhailovsky =

- Part of Russo-Circassian War
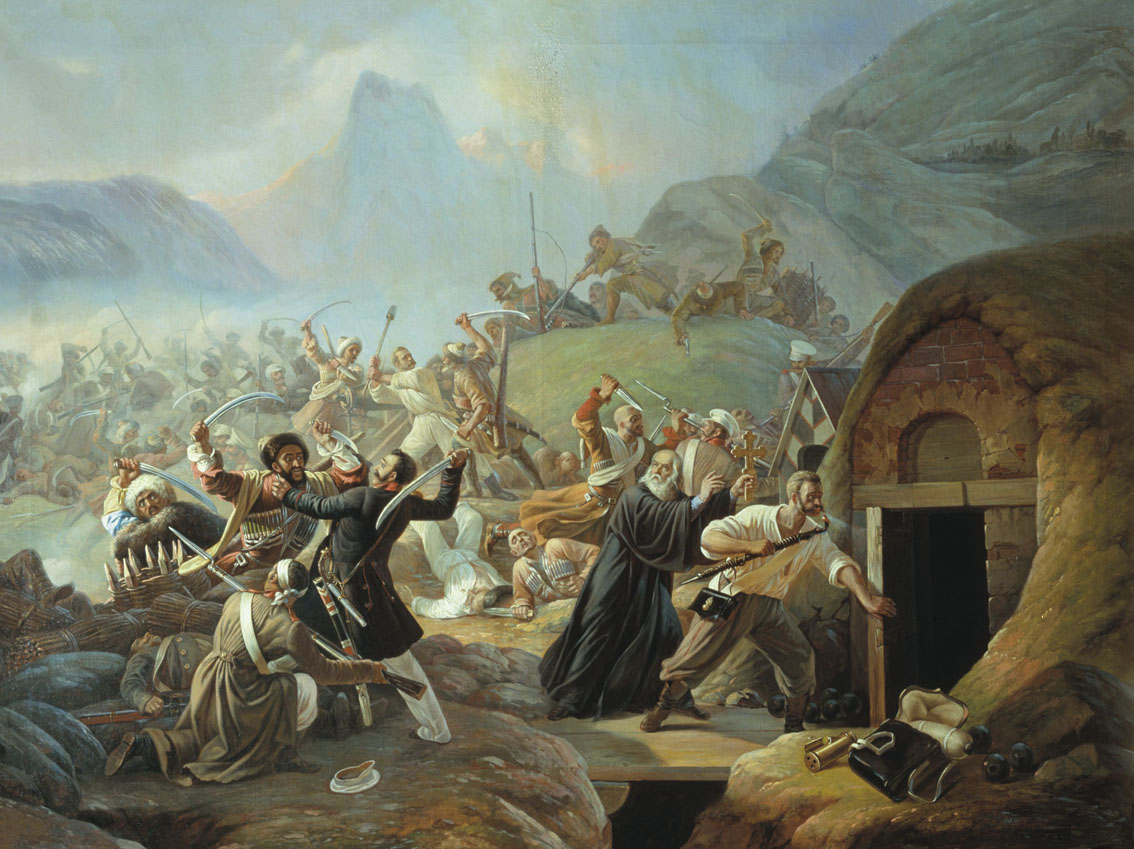
- The assault of the Mikhailovsky fortification by the Circassians on March 22, 1840
Date	March 22, 1840
Location	Mikhailovsky fortifications, Russian Empire (Present-day Arkhipo-Osipovka, Krasnodar Krai, Russia)
Result	Circassian victory

Belligerents
Circassia	(Russia) Russian Empire

Commanders and leaders
(Circassia) Ismail Berzeg (Circassia) Qerzech Shirikhuqo (Circassia) Hawduqo Mansur (Circassia) Yusuf Nicepsiho †	(Russia) Nikolay Liko † (Russia) Lieutenant Kraumgold † (Russia) Lieutenant Timchenko † (Russia) Lieutenant Beznosov † (Russia) Arkhip Osipov †

Units involved
Ubykh troops Abdzakh troops Shapsug troops Natukhaj troops	(Russia) Black Sea Line 2nd and 3rd companies of Battalion No. 4 (Russia) 6th Musketeer Company of Navaginsky Infantry Regiment (Russia) 9th Musketeer Company of Tenginsky Infantry Regiment

Strength
7,000	500; 8 cannons

Casualties and losses
Unknown	Entire garrison

The siege of Mikhailovsky (Adyghe: Михайловски Къэуцухьэ; Russian: Оборона Михайловского укрепления) took place on 3 April 1840 during the Russo-Circassian War. The Circassians defeated the Russian defenses and won the siege. Unwilling to accept defeat, Russian soldier Arhip Osipov infiltrated the powder magazine and detonated the explosives, killing himself, the remnants of the garrison, and a significant number of Circassians. The action was praised in the history of the Russian Army and was described as "symbolic immortality".

== Background ==
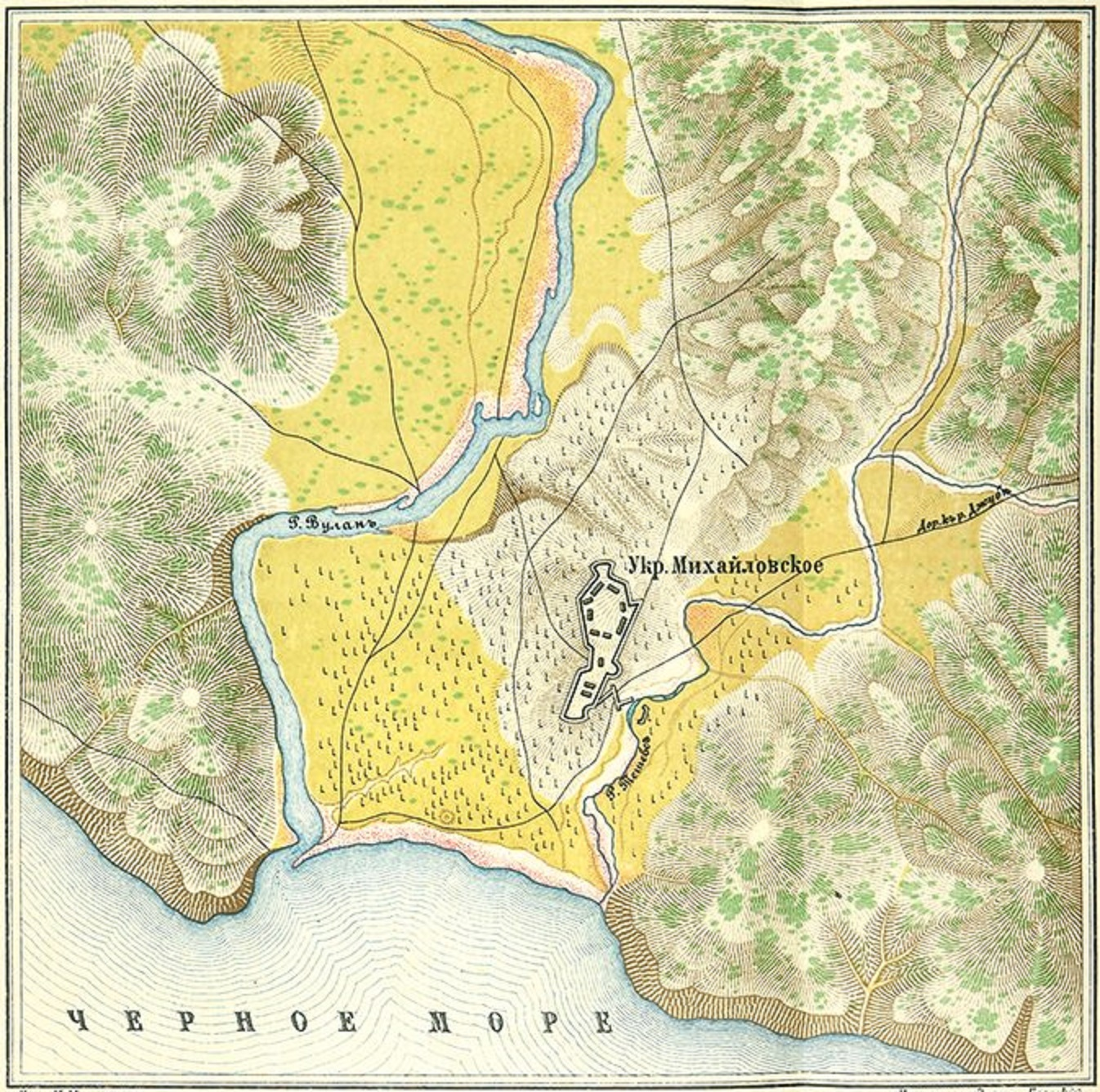
Plan of the perimeter of the Mikhailovsky fortifications. I. Basilev

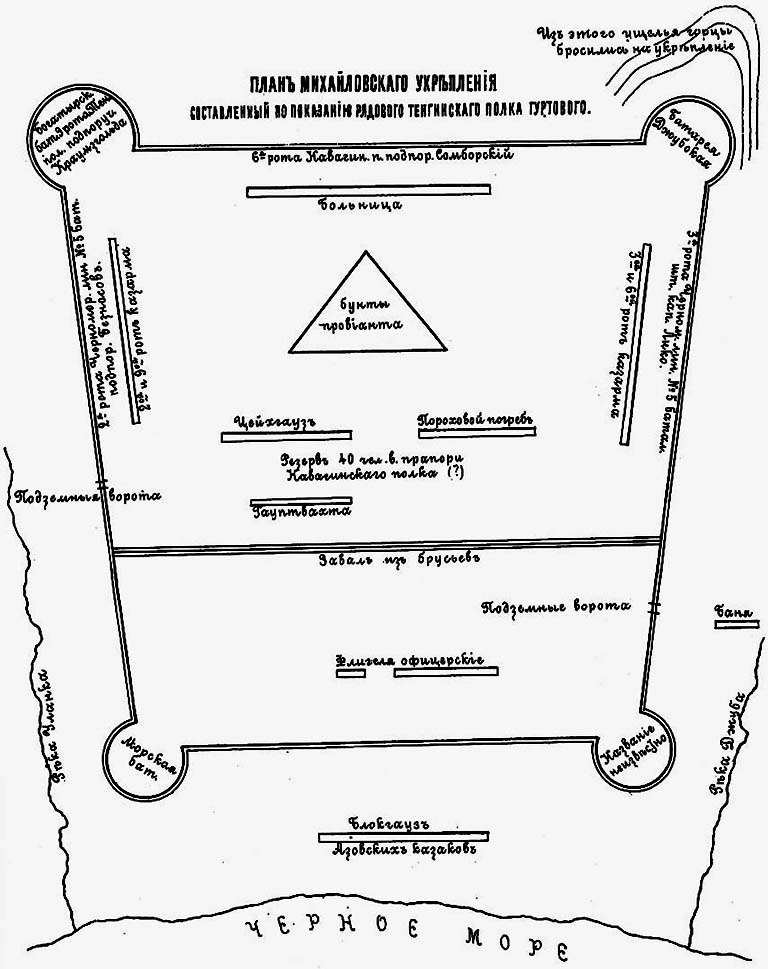
An approximate plan of Mikhailovsky fortification with the designation of the location of the garrison during the attack of the highlanders on March 22, 1840 (according to the testimony of retired Private S. Yakovlev, son of Gurtov, 1876)

The Russo-Circassian War had been going on since 1763. The Russians had been landing and building fortifications on the Black Sea coast of Circassia for a long time. The Russians began to strengthen their fortifications by making more landings on the Black Sea coast and gained control and gathered a large army. In 1834, Tuqhuzhuqo Kizbech, with 1,700 soldiers, trapped and destroyed a Russian army of 14,000. In the same year, he trapped and destroyed another Russian army of 6,000 with 1,200 soldiers. Then he destroyed many Russian garrisons, including Maryanskaya, Georgie, Afepskaya and Apenskaya. In 1837, he captured the Nikolayev fortification. After all these defeats, the Russians thought that there should be a stronger fortification in the region. The Mikhailovsky fortification began to be built in 1837 at the mouth of the Vulan River to establish control over the region. Its length was about 200 fathoms. The firing line was very wide and its length reached 540 fathoms. It was one of the strongest Russian fortifications in the region.

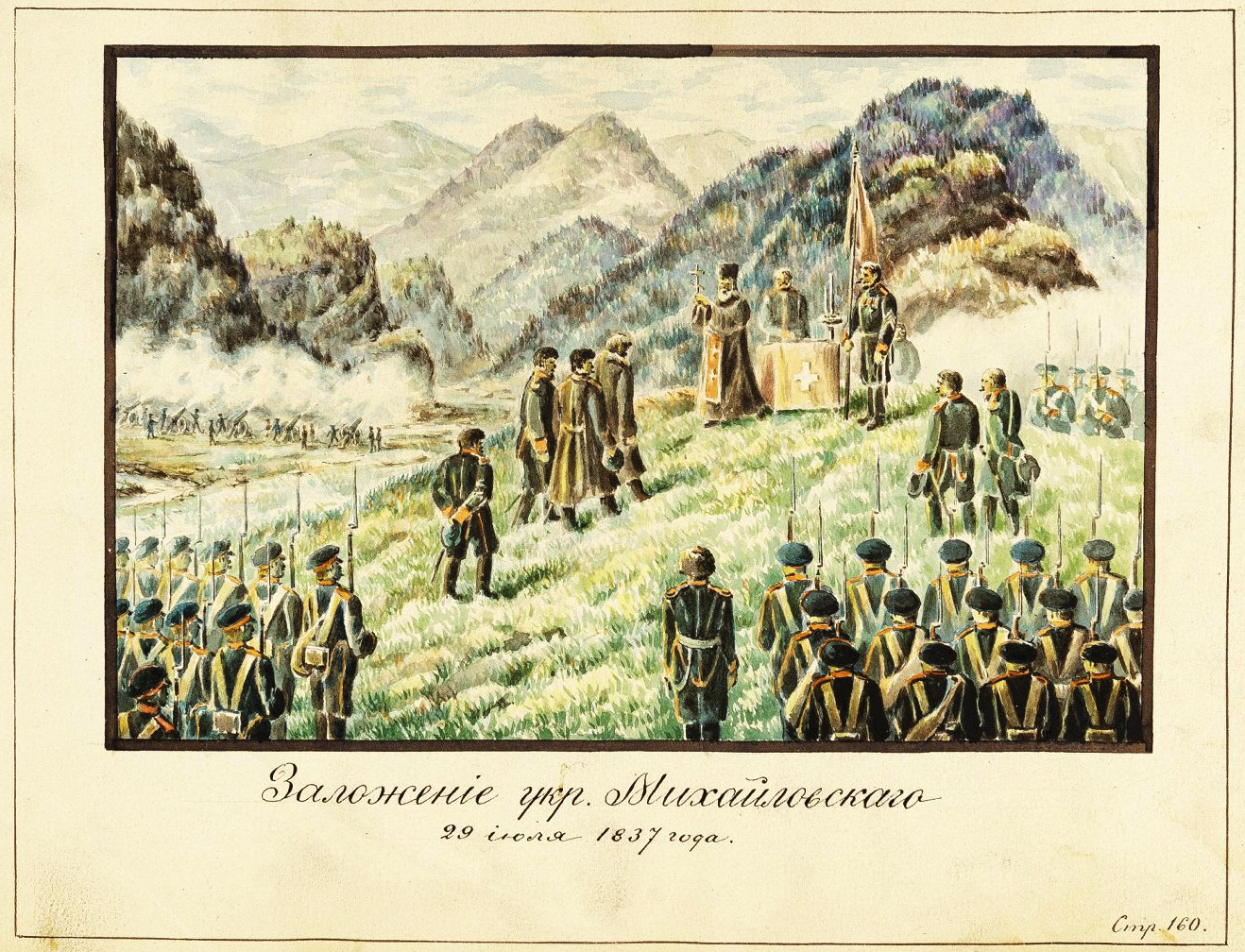
Laying the foundations of the Mikhailovsky Fortress, July 29, 1837.

Circassians, led by Ismail Berzeg, tried to prevent construction by attacking in 1837. From 1839 the fortification was given to the command of the 1st division of the Black Sea coastline. The head of this division was Rear Admiral L. M. Serebryakov, and the head of the entire coastline was Lieutenant General N. N. Rayevsky. After Circassian victories in other sieges, the garrison was reinforced, Eight cannons were installed on the bastions.

=== The Russian situation ===
The idea of establishing the Black Sea coastline belonged to Tsar Nicholas I. However, for various reasons, the fortifications were ineffective. Russian generals in the region considered the strategy of building fortifications to be completely unnecessary and that Alexey Yermolov's "strategy of terror" was more effective. However, Tsar Nicholas continued the construction of the fortifications.

Cast iron cannons of various calibers and ammunition were placed on the ramparts. The Circassians rarely used such technologies, so the Russians had a technological advantage.

The Circassians had cut off land communications between the coastal fortifications and the main Russian command. Therefore, in case of military danger, the Russian garrisons had to rely only on their own forces, without any hope of external help. Food was delivered to the fortifications by sea twice a year, and occasionally cruisers came along the way to pick up the sick.

=== Circassians situation ===
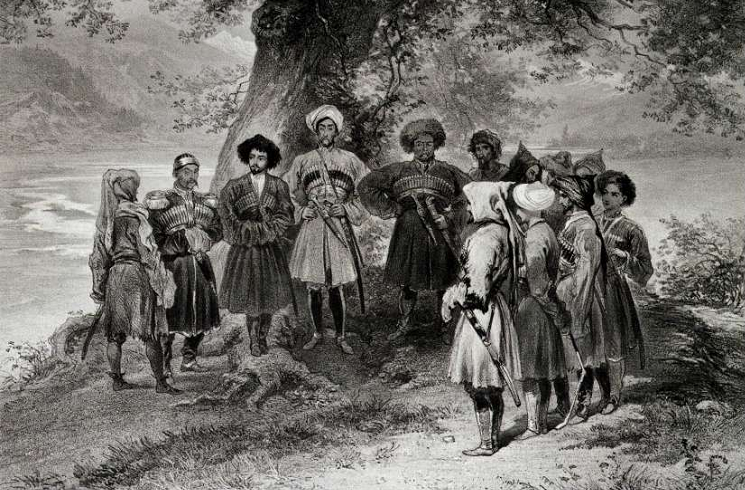
Circassian lords in 1839–1840

The Treaty of Edirne was signed on September 14, 1829. According to this treaty, the Ottoman Empire recognized the Caucasus, including Circassia, as Russian territory. The Circassians did not believe in the authenticity of this treaty. After the authenticity of the treaty was confirmed, Circassian ambassadors were sent to England, France and the Ottoman lands to inform them that the treaty was invalid for the Circassians. Russia used this treaty to strengthen its claim that Circassia belonged to it.

The Circassians were secretly supported by Turkish and British adventurers. In the traditional people's assembly, the Circassians decided to end all relations with the Russians and continue to resist Russian expansion.

In 1839 Circassia suffered a crop failure. One of the Circassian goals was to seize the reserves of Russian fortifications.

=== Before the siege ===
In the spring of 1840, a Circassian army was organized under the command of Ismail Berzeg. His nephew Berslan Berzeg also helped. The Circassian army consisted of 35,000 to 40,000 militants. The chief of the Caucasian line, General Pavel Grabbe, wrote in his report:

They abandoned their homes and families and took a joint oath that they would not disperse until they had captured all the forts and fortifications along the coastline.

Circassian spies, such as Shogen Musa, noted the weak points of Russian fortifications under the guise of trade. They obtained detailed information about the condition of the garrisons from Polish deserters. The Poles also helped the Circassians, teaching them the latest European methods of besieging the fortifications. The fortifications were clearly visible from the surrounding mountains at a distance of 250 fathoms.

On February 7, the siege of Lazarevsky took place, during which the Circassians took the Lazarevsky fortress. The chief of the Black Sea coast, Lieutenant-General Rayevsky, reported in his report: "The capture of this fortress will signal a general assault on all fortifications." Then, on the night of February 28–29, the Circassians captured the Velyaminovsky fortress as a result of the siege of Velyaminovsky . On the night of March 13–14, the Circassians tried to take the Golovinsky (Щэхэпэ къал) fortification. After the capture of the Lazarevsky and Velyaminovsky fortresses, the Circassians began to prepare for the assault on the Mikhailovsky fortification with new forces. On March 15, a Russian spy arrived at the fortress with the news that about 11 thousand Circassians had gathered to storm the fortress.

The commander of the Mikhailovsky fortification Nikolay Liko held a military meeting. At the meeting, he called on his soldiers "not to give up and to fight to the last drop of their blood." On March 17, a Russian spy confirmed the Circassian preparations for the attack. Russian soldiers slept with their weapons.

The Russian garrison of the Mikhailovsky fortification during the assault consisted of the 2nd and 3rd companies of the Black Sea Line Battalion No. 4, the 6th Musketeer Company of the Navaginsky Infantry Regiment and the 9th Musketeer Company of the Tenginsky Infantry Regiment. Eight cannons were installed on the ramparts. Two Cossacks who were captured by the Circassians and escaped reported that the number of Circassians was about 7 thousand people.

== Siege ==
=== First attack ===
By 22:00 on March 21, the Circassians had surrounded the fortifications from all sides at a considerable distance, their main force hiding in the forest beyond the Vulan River.

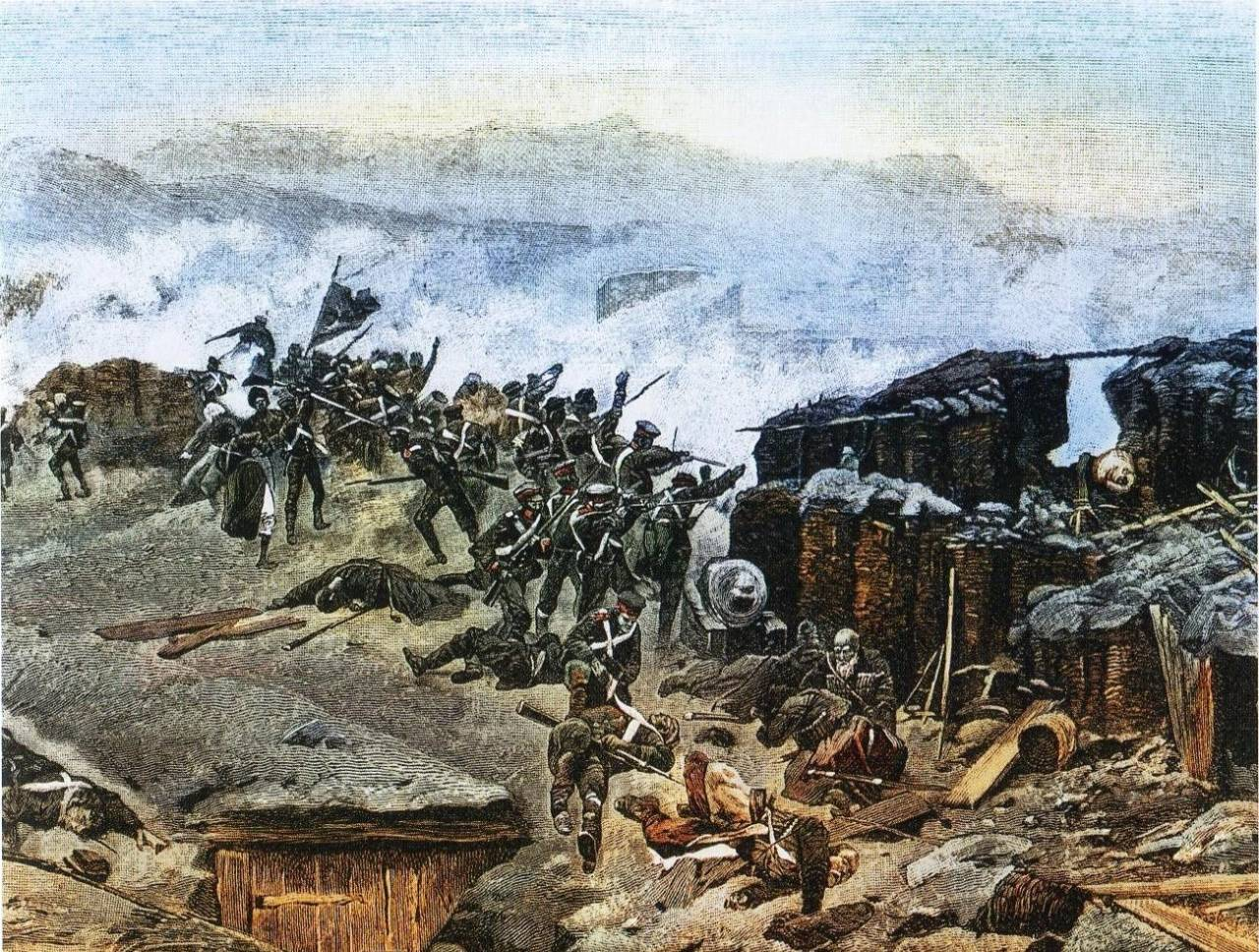
Attack on the Mikhailovsky fortifications by the Circassians. Худ. Ф. А. Рубо

At 4 o'clock on the night of March 21–22, just before dawn, the Circassians began to approach the walls silently from different directions with ladders in their hands. Noticing that the Circassians were advancing towards the fortifications, a guard immediately reported this to Senior Sergeant H. Komlev. The garrison opened fire. After the first cannon fire, the Circassians openly rushed to the attack with a "fierce cry". In the dark, the soldiers of the garrison fired at random, not seeing anything. Under heavy rifle and cannon fire, the Circassians decided to retreat.

There was light fighting for about an hour and a half, after which the Circassians continued a rapid attack. The cannon managed to fire a volley of gunfire from the fortress across the moat where the attackers were already positioned. Despite this, the Circassians managed to climb the ramparts, where they engaged in fierce hand-to-hand fighting. The Russians threw the Circassians off the ramparts several times, but fresh Circassian forces climbed back up. Finally, more troops arrived to help and managed to push the attackers off the ramparts. The defenders of the fortress continued to fire rifles and cannon fire at the retreating mountaineers, significantly increasing their losses.

=== Circassian military council ===
After the failed attack, disagreements began in the Circassian camp. After a long discussion, they reached an agreement. It was decided to send the infantry militia to the attack a second time, and the cavalry to approach to perform the function of a barrier detachment.

=== Second attack ===
Caught between two fires, the Circassian soldiers launched a new attack and, despite the defenders' heavy fire, managed to climb the walls simultaneously from several places.

According to G. I. Philipson, initially part of the Circassians attacked part of the fortification, but this turned out to be a "fake" attack. The purpose of this fake attack was to draw the garrison away from the northern and northeastern parts of the fortress, followed by the main forces of the Circassians.

The remnants of the 3rd Line Company defending the Juba battery were defeated by the Circassians. The commander of the 9th company of the Tenginsky regiment, Lieutenant Kraumgold, was shot and stumbled as he ran to the scene shouting "don't be afraid", and was later "torn to pieces" by the Circassians. Soon after, the commander of the 6th company of the Navaginsky regiment, Lieutenant Timchenko, was also killed. A few minutes later, the commander of the artillery, Lieutenant Yermolaev, and with him every gunner were killed.

During the battle, the garrison was split in two and driven back by the Circassians. During the retreat, the garrison burned food and other stores so that they would not fall into Circassian hands.

The remnants of the Russian forces continued to defend themselves. Commander Liko was wounded in the right leg and blood was flowing into his eyes from his severed left eyebrow.

A Russian spy who had infiltrated the Circassian ranks shouted at Liko to "surrender voluntarily." The agent was immediately shot, and the Circassians attacked with even greater fury.

At the same time, some Russian soldiers took 4 cannons and opened fire on the Circassians. The Circassians rushed to the cannons and engaged these soldiers. A Russian soldier here, Aleksandr Fyodorov, fought for a long time with a bayonet and rifle butt with about a dozen Circassians. Because of his bravery, the Circassians decided not to kill him but to capture him alive. After Fyodorov was completely exhausted and lowered his rifle, the Circassians captured him.

During the 3-hour battle, all Russian officers were killed. All the bastions were captured by the Circassians and red victory banners were hung on them while shouting "Allahu Akbar".

=== Suicide attack ===
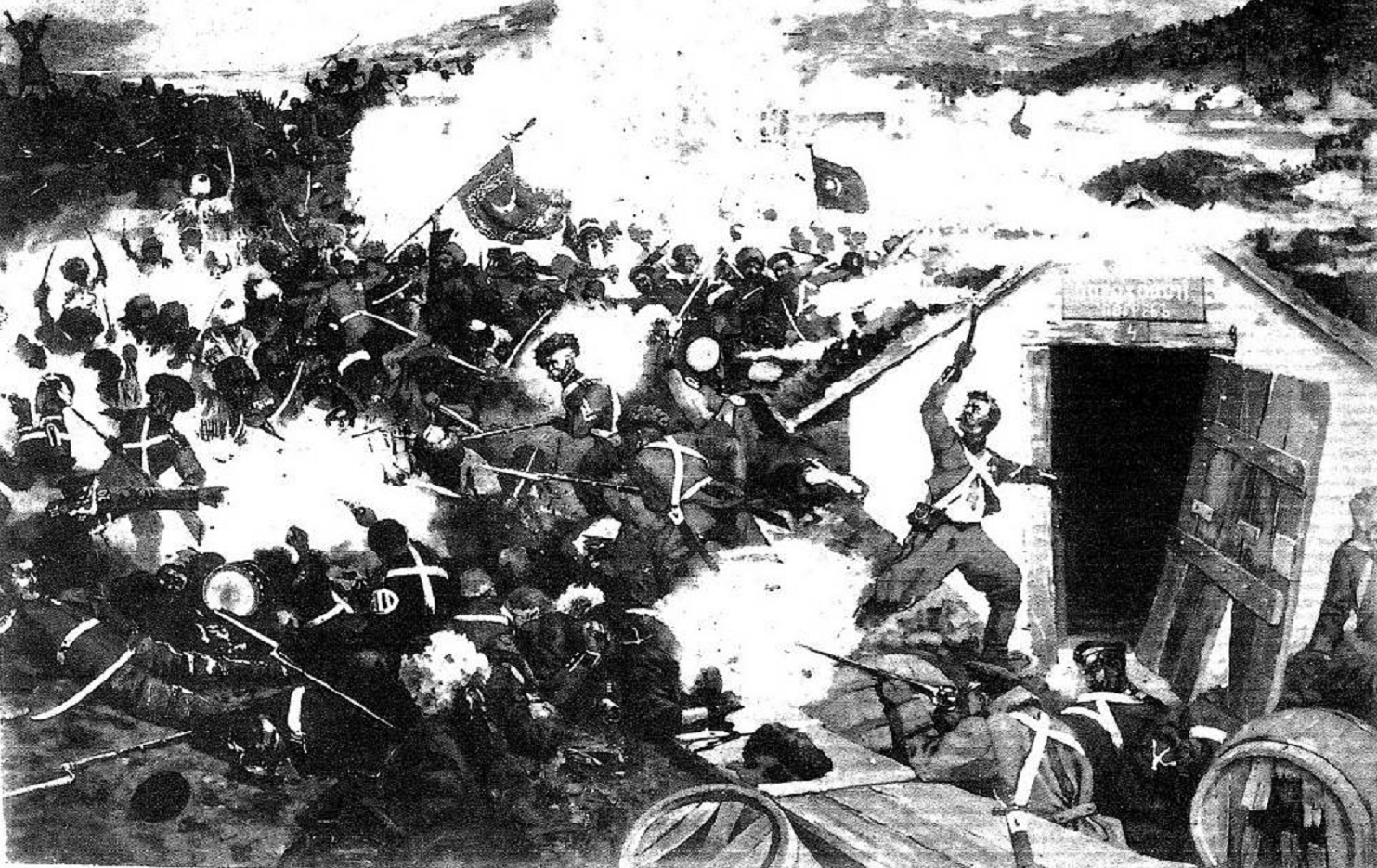
The feat of Private 77th Infantry Tenginsky Regiment Arkhip Osipov. Explosion of Mikhailovsky fortification on March 22, 1840

Arhip Osipov, a Russian officer, ran to the powder magazine when he saw the loss of the Russian forces. Father Markel blessed Osipov and allowed him to pray to the cross, after which Osipov shouted:

The time has come! The survivor remembers what I have done!

Then he started the explosion. In addition to the loaded grenades, there were about 200 poods of gunpowder in the depot. All of them exploded. DV Rakovic wrote, quoting the words of an eyewitness:

There was a terrible noise, everything shook, and a column of smoke rose into the air, full of flames, human corpses, and stones! Everything was silent, and the sun, which had not yet come to noon, illuminated only a bloody picture of death and destruction.

== Aftermath ==
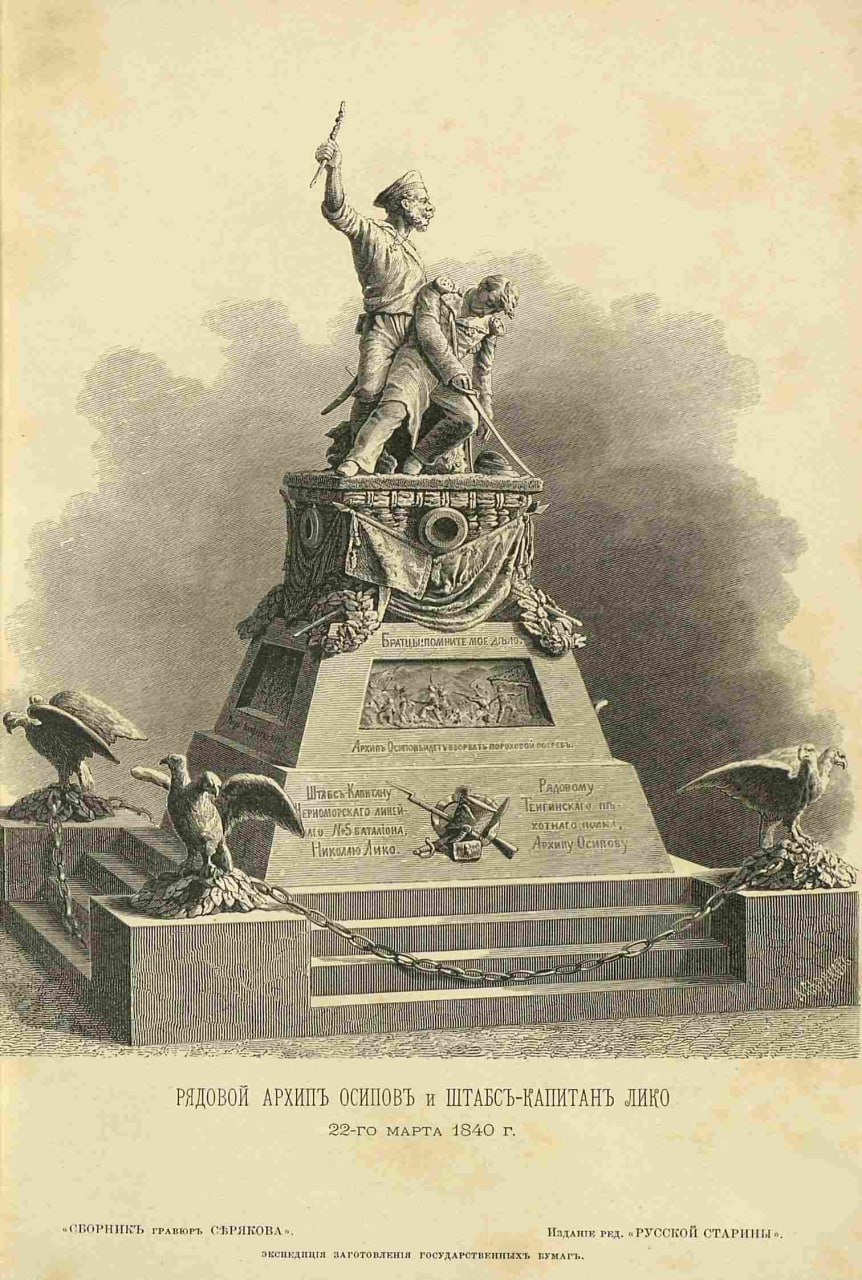
Arkhip Osipov's feat depicted on the cover of Russkaia starina magazine

All Russian commanders in the siege died, except for Commander Nikolay Liko, who was captured by the Circassians and later died of his wounds.

On April 11, Lieutenant General NN Rayevsky also received a report on the fall of the Mikhailovsky fortifications and noted:

Terrible! I am extremely afraid that this will not be our last misfortune yet!

According to General G. I. Philipson, the Velyaminovsky and Mikhailovsky fortresses were the most important fortresses in the region, and he noted:

We did not save these fortresses by strengthening them, we only increased the losses! The mountaineers, however, did not lose their motivation from the casualties suffered during the capture of the Mikhailovsky fortification. They swore that they would not lay down their arms until they had destroyed all the Russian buildings on their land.
