= Battle of Abinsk =

1834 battle of the Russo-Circassian War

- Part of Russo-Circassian War
Date	1834
Location	Abinsk, Circassia
Result	Circassian victory

Belligerents
Circassia	(Russia) Russian Empire

Commanders and leaders
(Circassia) Qizbech Tughuzhuqo (Circassia) Hawduqo Mansur (Circassia) Qalebatuqo Hatuqay	(Russia) Alexey Velyaminov

Strength
500–700	14,000

Casualties and losses
150 killed	6,000 killed 7 supply wagons captured

The Battle of Abin was a significant military engagement during the Russo-Circassian War, fought in 1834 between the combined forces of Circassian leaders Tughuzhuqo Kizbech and Hawduqo Mansur against the Russian Empire. The battle took place in the Abin region of Circassia (modern-day Abinsk, Krasnodar Krai, Russia). Despite being heavily outnumbered, Circassian forces achieved a devastating victory against the enemy, employing effective guerrilla tactics against a larger, better-equipped Russian force.

== Background ==
The Russo-Circassian War was a protracted conflict between the Russian Empire and the various peoples of the Caucasus, including the Circassians, who fiercely resisted Russian expansion into their territories. Tuquzhuqo Kizbech was a prominent leader of the Shapsug Circassian tribe, known for his military prowess and strategic acumen. Kizbech is said to have never lost a battle. Hawduqo Mansur was a military leader of the Natukhaj tribe and later served as the leader of the Circassian Confederation from 1839 to 1846. In 1834, Kizbech and Hawduqo led a small force of less than 700 warriors against a much larger Russian force estimated to be around 14,000 troops.

The Russians were transporting supplies to build the Abin Fortress by the Abin River. Meanwhile 700 Circassian cavalries led by Hawduqo Mansur and Tuquzhuqo Kizbech, prepared an ambush in a nearby forest near the Russians route. The Circassians debated the attack strategy:

Most of Kizbech's Shapsug warriors (except Kizbech himself) voted for long-range rifle fire, while Mansur and his men voted for a direct cavalry charge with their swords, saying they would either achieve something or perish. Most Circassians agreed on the cavalry charge. Around 500 Circassians joined the attack, while the rest withdrew, considering this assault as a suicide mission.

== Battle ==
On the battle, Kizbech's and Hawduqo's forces faced overwhelming odds but employed the difficult terrain of the Abin River to their advantage. Using guerrilla tactics, they ambushed Russian units, disrupted their formations, and inflicted heavy casualties. The Circassians’ speed and knowledge of the land allowed them to engage in hit-and-run tactics, causing confusion among the Russian troops.

== Aftermath ==
The result of the battle was a decisive Circassian victory, despite the large disparity in numbers. The Russian force suffered significant losses. The Circassians also captured seven supply wagons filled with vital resources such as forage and munitions after severe fighting further hindering Russian operations in the region.

Kizbech's and Hawduqo Mansur's leadership and tactical brilliance were key factors in the Circassian success. Kizbech's ability to rally his warriors and exploit the terrain against a larger, more heavily armed Russian force became a symbol of Circassian resistance.

== Legacy ==
The Battle of Abin became a symbol of Circassian resilience and tactical ingenuity during the Russo-Circassian War. Tuquzhuqo Kizbech's victory, despite the overwhelming odds, bolstered the morale of the Circassian resistance and earned him a place as one of the key military figures of the conflict. The battle is remembered in Circassian oral history as a heroic stand against Russian imperialism.

Kizbech's successful tactics in this battle are studied as examples of guerrilla warfare and the effective use of terrain in asymmetrical warfare. James Bell, who visited Circassia, recorded that the Circassians composed a song about this battle.
