= Qizbech Tughuzhuqo =

Circassian military commander

Hajji Tughuzhuqo Qizbech
- ШэрэлIыкъо Тыгъужъыкъо Къызбэч
- "The Lion of Circassia" statue in Afipsip, Republic of Adygea, depicting Qizbech Tughuzhuqo

Commander-in-chief of the Circassians
- In office 1810–1840

Personal details
- Born: 1777 Beannash, Shapsugia, Circassia
- Died: 28 February 1840 (aged 62–63) Shapsugia, Circassia
- Party: National Oath
- Parent: Tughuzh
- House: House of Sheretluqo; Yelmishequ
- Nickname(s): The Lion of Circassia; Lion of the Nation

Military service
- Allegiance: Circassia: Shapsugia; Ottoman Empire: Ottoman Egypt (1796–1810)
- Years of service: 1810 – 1840
- Battles/wars: Circassian Revolution; Battle of Bziyiqo; French invasion of Egypt and Syria; Russo-Circassian War; Battle of Abinsk; Siege of Lazarevsky; Siege of Velyaminovsky

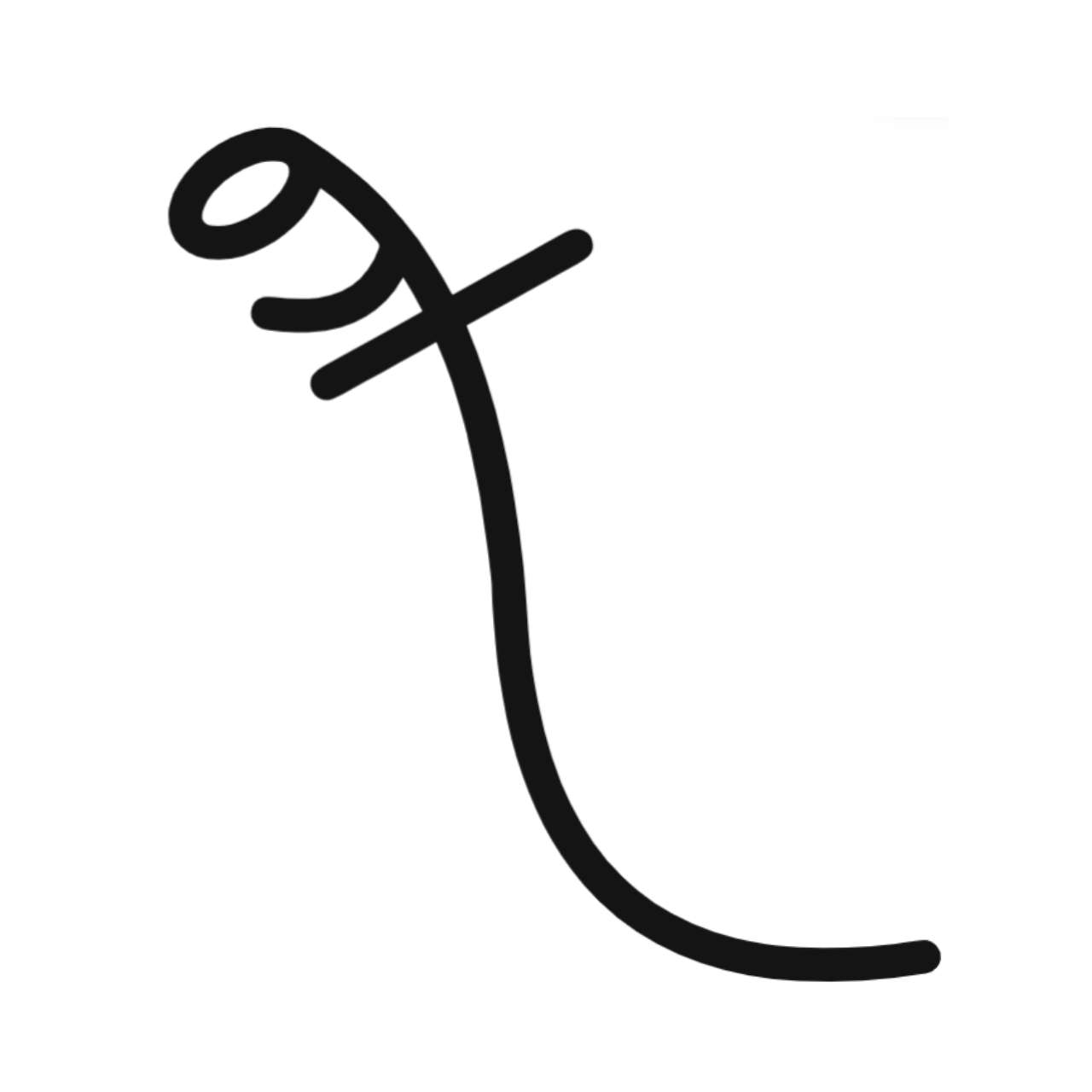
The tamga of the house of Sheretluqo.

Qizbech "the Lion of Circassia" Tughuzhuqo (Note: 1777–1840; (Adyghe: ШэрэлIыкъо Тыгъужъыкъо Къызбэч [ʃaraɬʼəqʷa təʁʷəʐəqʷa qəzbatʃ]; Russian: Тугужуко Казбич). Also known as Ghuz Bek, Kizbek/Kazbek, and various other spellings (Shapsug dialect: Тыгъужъыкъу Къызбэкь; Russian: Казбек)) was a Circassian soldier, military commander and a leader of the Shapsug who took part in the Russo-Circassian War. A cavalry commander, he was known for his success in utilising guerilla tactics and raiding behind enemy lines. Qizbech's close family, including all of his sons, were killed in the war, and he refused offers from the Russian Empire to switch sides and join its Imperial ranks. During his life, he emerged as a populist folk hero in Circassia, ransoming Circassian prisoners of war with his own money and raiding Russian supply lines, distributing the loot to Circassian commoners. In oral tradition, songs and ballads were composed in his name, and he was nicknamed the "Lion of Circassia". Qizbech Tughuzhuqo died of wounds received in action on February 28, 1840, during the Siege of Veliaminovsky.

Qizbech's reputation attracted the attention of European journalists and adventurers. Sources and contemporary writers on Qizbech include David Urquhart, secretary of the British Embassy in Istanbul and a supporter of the Circassians who contributed to the Portfolio magazine; Edmund Spencer and John E. Longworth, travellers who reported from Circassia for The Times; and James Stanislaus Bell, who followed Urquhart's lead in writing letters to the British people. The last three of them met Qizbech personally and recorded their memories. Among the Circassian writers of the period, Sultan Khan-Giray provides information about Qizbech. On the Russian side, both the poet Mikhail Lermontov and the Russian Lieutenant General Vasily Aleksandrovich Potto, the first detailed historian of the Caucasian War, mention him. Fyodor A. Shcherbina also provides information about Qizbech.

== Biography ==
=== Name ===
The name Qizbech is standard Circassian. In his own Shapsug dialect, it is Qizbek (Къызбэкь), which is a shortened form of Qizilbek and is recorded as Guz Bek, Ghezil Bek and Kazbek in various sources. He is referred to as Kızıl Bey in Ottoman documents.

Qizbech's original surname was Sheretluqo, while Tughuzhuqo means "son of Tughuzh". The word "Tughuzh" is a Circassian name and also means "wolf" in the Circassian language. Among the Circassians, both surnames and nicknames usually ended with the suffix "-qo", equivalent to the English "-son" suffix.

=== Early life ===
Not much is recorded about Qizbech's early life, as Circassians did not write down their history, and all knowledge comes from Russian sources. Tughuzhuqo was born in 1777 in the village of Beannash (Adyghe: Нашъхьэ), to the Shapsug noble house of Sheretluqo. He was the son of Yelmishequ's son Sheretluqo Tughuzh, (Note: In the 18th century, as the Zhaney tribe became weaker, its members joined the Shapsugh and Natukhai tribes. These tribes did not have princes, so some Zhaney princes kept their high status by becoming noblemen instead.) one of the most prominent figures among the Shapsugs. Songs dedicated to him begin with establishing his lineage:

О ятэшхор Елмыщэкъу,
Ащ ыкъоу Тыгъужъ,
Тыгъужъыкъо Къызбэч!

Translation:

His grandfather Yelmishequ,
Whose son is Tughuzh,
Tughuzh's son Qizbech!

A theory suggests that the Sheretluqo family comes from Bekkan/Bechkan, which was a branch of Zhaney princes. (Note: In the 18th century, as the Zhaney tribe became weaker, its members joined the Shapsugh and Natukhai tribes. These tribes did not have princes, so some Zhaney princes kept their high status by becoming noblemen instead.) He was born into a family of seven children. Qizbech was 192–193 cm tall. Historical accounts describe Qizbech as a man of enormous physical stature with a loud voice and audacious, rough mannerisms.

=== Military service ===
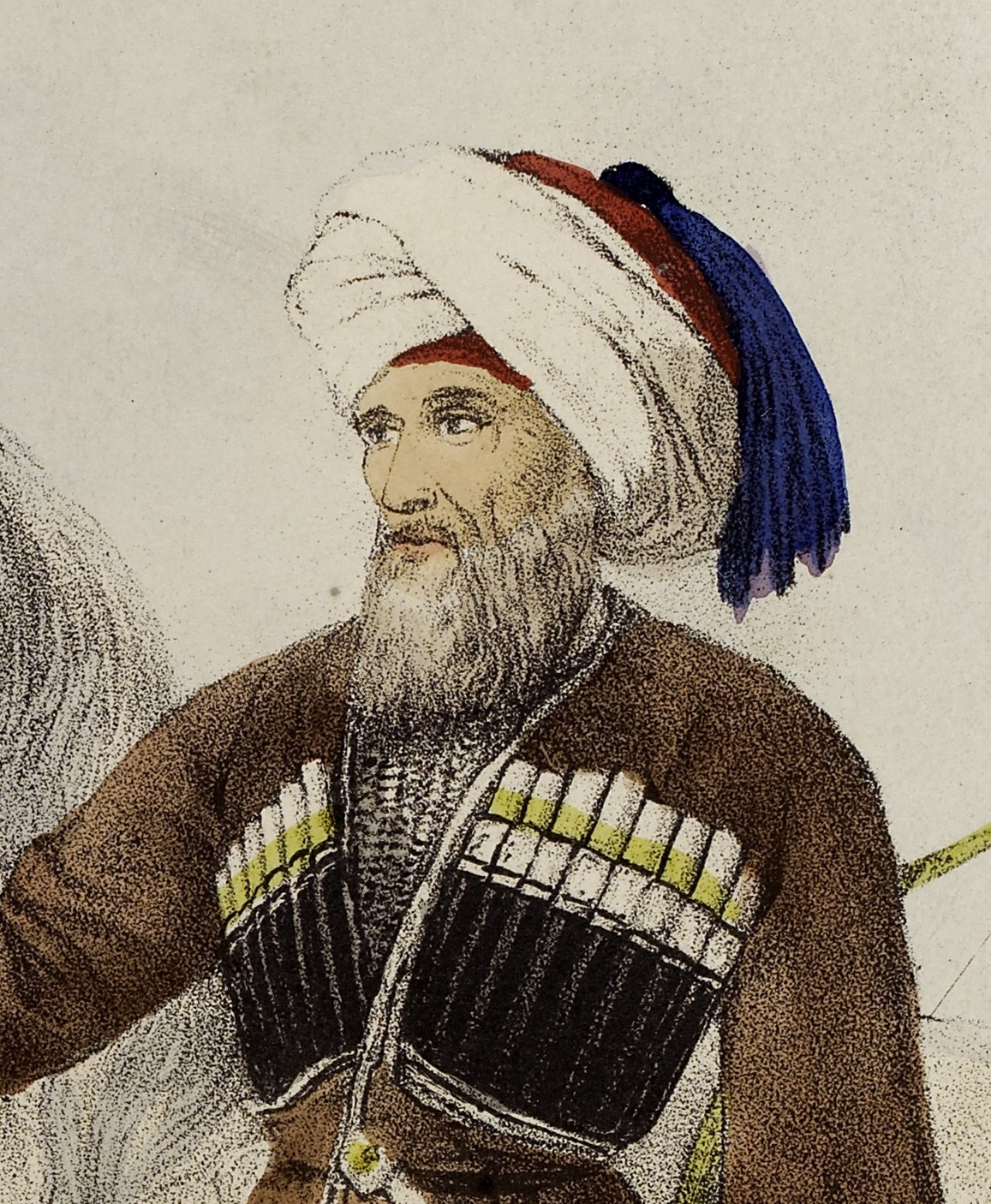
A portrait of Qizbech Tughuzhuqo, drawn by James Stanislaus Bell who knew him in person

During Qizbech's youth, Jembulat Boletoqo was more influential. The Circassian revolution began in Shapsugia in the early 1790s. The conflict culminated in the Battle of Bziyiqo in 1796, when Qizbech was approximately 18 or 19 years old. While the war involved Shapsug peasants rebelling against the nobility, it is unclear as to which side Qizbech supported during the battle. He nearly lost his head during the battle but survived with a deep scar. After the revolution, Qizbech does not appear in written sources between 1796 and 1810. According to Circassian oral traditions, during this period Qizbech met with Hasan Pasha, the Ottoman governor of Anapa, and went on a pilgrimage to Mecca. After that, he stayed for a time in Egypt, where at some point he met Muhammad Ali of Egypt and served in the Egyptian army against the French invasion of Egypt and Syria. He returned to Circassia definitively in 1810 and began to appear again in written records. After this, he continued to fight for the Circassian army. In 1810, the Olginske Fortress was taken by the Circassian forces which Qizbech participated. He gained fame between 1810 and 1839, and almost all major Circassian raids on Russian fortifications during this period are associated with his name.

Qizbech started his struggle once the Russo-Circassian War reached western Circassia. Between the years 1810–1840, he stormed the Russian garrisons and settlements with a volley of attacks. His main rival was the Cossack ataman Maxim Vlasov. He rose to fame by defeating Vlasov in 1820. During Vlasov's period, the violence against Circassian villages reached such proportions that Tsar Alexander I removed him from office in July 1826. In 1821, he defeated a Russian campaign on the lands of Shapsug. In the June of the same year, Qizbech attacked the Alexandriyske Fortress with 1,000 men. In October 1822, he was wounded during the assault on the Yelizavetinskaya Fortress. The Circassians believed that Qizbech had met a figure like Khidr (Alebiy in Circassian), Qizbech claimed Alebiy told him the outcome of battles beforehand; it is traditionally believed that he knew he would die before dying in his final battle.

On March 12, 1823, Qizbech crossed the Kuban River with an army of 1,500 and attacked a Russian stanitsa in construction near Yelizavetinsky. While he was fighting the 200-strong Cossack unit stationed there, 200 Cossacks and two cannons arrived from Alexandrovsky Fortress, and the artillery fire halted the Circassians. As Qizbech prepared for an attack, General Vlasov's army approached to the battlefield, prompting the Circassians to retreat. The Cossacks pursued and attacked the retreating forces. During the clashes, Qizbech captured a sergeant and two soldiers. Russian artillery took position and opened fire and Qizbech's eldest son was killed by the artillery, and his body was captured by the Cossacks.

On 9 October 1823, Qizbech unsuccessfully tried ambushing Russian forces near the Alexandrovsky post. Two days later he launched a raid on Elizavetinskaya settlement, and his forces got into an engagement with the defending Cossacks. According to eyewitness accounts, Qizbech fought to break the encirclement; he suffered a severe sabre blow to his left temple and neck, and was pierced through the side by a pike. However, after receiving news of approaching Russian reinforcements, Qizbech headed back to Circassia. The Russians intercepted his forces twice, leading to heavy casualties on the Circassian side; however, Qizbech managed to get back to Circassia, heavily wounded and with 3 captives.

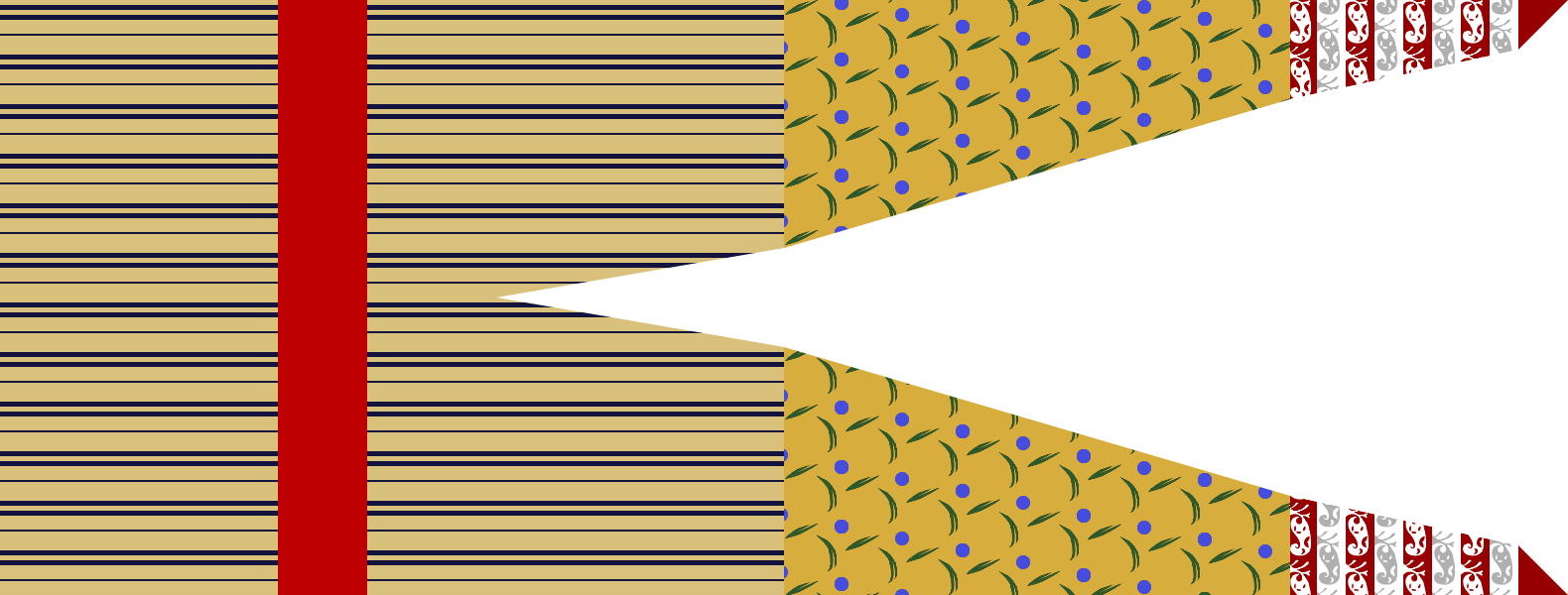
Shapsug flag

Sultan Khan-Giray had said the following about him:

All you need to do is send messengers in the name of Kizilbech – thousands will rush to serve under his command.

— Sultan Khan-Giray

Qizbech was part of the team that designed the Shapsug flag. Russia frequently tried to persuade the upper-class Circassians to switch sides, offering them high privileges. Qizbech resisted and rejected these offers. He punished those who accepted such proposals. In a letter dated November 8, 1824, Colonel Matveyev wrote to Major General Vlasov:

On October 31, the Abzakh held a meeting in the Zhebi River Valley. The famous Shapsug knight Kizbech also attended this gathering, where they decided to attack us. To carry out this plan, they unanimously agreed that Kizbech would gather raiders in the area from the upper parts of Afipsip to Shebzh. The Abzakh living in the Tsafe, Zhebi, Akobish, and Sup valleys are ready. They are prepared to march in these days, joining forces with the Shapsugs under Kizbech's command. Their numbers reach around 1,000, and they have decided to launch simultaneous attacks on multiple locations.

— Colonel Matveyev

Englishman Favell Lee Mortimer said these:

There was a Circassian named Guzbeg (he might still be alive), and he earned the title "Lion of Circassia." He frequently directed groups of soldiers to attack the Russians. One day, he saw some Russian soldiers harvesting crops in a field, and he approached them. Just seeing him, the soldiers fled in terror, leaving behind two sickles in the field. He seized the sickles.

However, a great disaster befell this Lion. He had a son. The first time he took his son to war, he ordered him never to flee from the enemy, but to cut through the middle of their ranks. One day, Guzbeg charged into a group of Russian soldiers, when suddenly his horse was shot. Guzbeg was thrown to the ground.

The Lion lay among the hunters. If a second had passed, he would have been killed! But suddenly, a young warrior rushed to save him; it was his own son! But what could be done in such a crowd? A Circassian cavalry unit rushed to the scene and took Guzbeg away, but it was too late to save his son. They only carried the brave boy's body. Guzbeg was deeply moved, but he continued to fight for his country.

— Favel Lee Mortimer

On January 23, 1825, Qizbech gathered a 2,000-strong army and crossed the frozen Kuban River to avenge the Russian attacks on Circassian villages in 1824. Qizbech attacked two Cossack units there and shortly afterwards, General Vlasov and reinforcements from the surrounding positions joined the battle, and intense fighting lasting 6 hours took place.

In 1830, Qizbech attacked Yelizavetinskaya settlement and destroyed it. In July, Qizbech and his brother Batcheriy gathered 2,500 cavalry and 1,500 infantry and fought for days near Mount Satruk against General Bezkrovni's Cossacks, who were attempting to build a fortress near the Shebsh River. Since the fortress in Satruk was built in a strategically important place on the border of Abzakh and Shapsug, it was frequently attacked by these tribes including the Ubykhs and Natukhajs even during its construction phase. In 1831, Qizbech and his Shapsug unit continued to launch constant attacks on and harass the fortress. On August 14, Qizbech captured the strategic passage roading to Alexeyevskoye Fortress with 3,000 warriors. In September, he attacked Yelizavetinskaya Fortress. On December 1, Qizbech sent several Circassian units across the Kuban to distract the Russian forces, while he himself attacked the Marinska stanitsa with 500 cavalry and 700 infantry.

According to Circassian oral sources, the commander of the fortress at Satruk assigned three collaborator Circassians to assassinate Qizbech. The assassination attempt failed; one of the assassins was killed in the clash, another was captured, and the last one managed to escape.

Due to intense Circassian attacks and harassment, the Russian garrison withdrew from Satruk and abandoned the fortress in 1832. On March 3, about 2 kilometers from the village of Gutehable, a force of 4,000 Shapsug and Abzaks led by Qizbech clashed with a 3,000-strong Bzhedug force with the Cossack support, which they accused of collaborating with the Russians. The Bzhedugs managed to resist the attacks with their defensive positions. On November 24, Qizbech crossed the Kuban River with 700 cavalry and 300 infantry and set fire to the Cossacks' hay depots. The Circassians, noticing Major General Berhman's attempt to quietly trap the Circassians, retreated when they realized that the main Russian force was approaching.

In 1834, heading a force of 700 cavaliers along with Hawduqo Mansur, he brutally defeated a 14,000 soldier Russian troops in the Battle of Abinsk. Again, in the same year, he headed 1,200 cavaliers to victory over 6 thousand Russian soldiers. In the same year, with 1,200 cavaliers, Qizbech encountered a Cossack detachment of less than 300 men. Admiring the courage and determination of the Cossacks, Qizbech withdrew some of his own cavalry to equalize the numerical advantage. The sides fought with equal numbers, and Qizbech's side won the battle. In a separate engagement that same year, he led 900 Circassians to rout another large Russian detachment. In this victory, Qizbech successfully reclaimed the plunder taken by the Russians from nine Circassian auls (villages) and liberated all the Circassian prisoners. During the wars, he went on a pilgrimage to Mecca and also visited Egypt. The Egyptian rulers wanted to recruit him into the Egyptian army, but Qizbech rejected the offer.

Russian military historian Vasily Potto, who served in the Russian army in the Caucasus, said these about Qizbech:

Tughuzhuqo Kizbech fought like a madman himself: they cut his left temple and neck, and pierced his side with a spear. Yet, covered in blood, he returned to Kuban on a horse.

— Vasily Potto

In October 1836, Qizbech attacked the Marinska Fortress with 700 men. On December 16, he attacked a Russian unit sent from Georgiy-Afipsky Fortress to cut wood with 200 warriors. In April 1837, Cossack forces who had attacked and destroyed the Abzakh villages near the Ilik and Sup rivers were ambushed during their retreat by Abzakh warriors led by Qizbech. The retreat was marked by nearly continuous engagements, during which Qizbech wounded seven times.

The Shapsug nobles criticized Qizbech for maintaining close relations with commoners. In response, Qizbech gave an ironic and mocking reply, saying that he is fighting together with the commoners against the Russian aggression, because of that many commoners were already being killed in these clashes: "I am taking revenge on them on behalf of all of you: I take them to the Russians, and there hundreds of them are being killed!.."

Russian settlers established by Russia along the Kuban River decided to return because of disease and famine. They lost their way in a snowstorm and arrived near a Circassian village. The Circassians helped them and reported the situation to Qizbech. When Qizbech arrived at the village he said the settlers were ordinary people and ordered that they be helped. The settlers stayed for three months until the end of winter. In the spring they were given horses and food and sent to the Circassian border.

Over many years, he raided several hostile Russian garrisons; Maryanskaya, Georgie, Afepskaya, Apenskaya, and in 1837 while crossing through a field, he was identified by Cossack peasants, who out of their great fear, fled the place leaving behind them 200 sickles. In the same year of 1837, Qizbech stormed the coastal castle of Nikolayev and seized all its properties. At the beginning of June 1837, he attacked the guards of the Nikolaevsky fortress (now Shapsugskaya village) alone, captured a soldier, and seized 9 rifles.

In 1837, accompanied by 250 men, he attacked the right bank of the Kuban Russian fort and captured 200 prisoners. As a warrior, Tughuzhuqo enjoyed great respect among opponents. Tsarist generals entered into negotiations with him and repeatedly offered him to join the service of Russia, he rejected all offers. After the failure of his generals to convince him, Tsar Nicholas I tried to personally approach Qizbech to dissuade him from continuing his acts. Qizbech rejected offers of money and continued his raids on Russian garrisons.

Qizbech was against any kind of compromise with Russia. In 1838, he launched an attack against the Zhaney Circassians of the Karakuban region, who had sworn allegiance to Russia. In April, Qizbech attacked the Georgiy-Afipsky Fortress. On October 1, the Cossacks, who could not find a village to attack where they were said to be, started to return and on their way back, they captured a flock of sheep from the Circassians, and accidentally came across to the camp set up by Qizbech with his 100 men on the banks of the Afips River. The Circassians launched an intense attack to recapture the herd and increased their pressure with the arrival of 500 cavalry, killing several Russian dignitaries, but they retreated because the artillery fire increased their losses. In this clash, Qizbech's son Alibiy was shot and seriously wounded, later died from his wound. According to James Bell, who was present there, Qizbech was not affected by this and saw it as fate. On October 8, a 2,100-strong Russian detachment decided to return due to bad weather conditions while on its way to attack Circassian villages. On the way back, the detachment was ambushed by Circassians but repelled the attack with artillery fire. Subsequently, Qizbech's 200 cavalry attacked separately until they were driven back by artillery fire. In this battle, Qizbech was seriously wounded by a gunshot to his right arm and suffered a broken elbow.

According to oral sources, the Shapsugs under the command of Qizbech advanced toward a Cossack fortress to attack. The Cossacks in the fortress were prepared for the attack due to information provided by Circassian collaborators who were working to Russians. The Circassians launched multiple attacks in groups of dozens but could not capture the fortress. They reorganized and withdrew to the Kuban River with their main forces to make decisions to decide whether to continue the assault or not. While the wounded and dead were being brought from the battlefield, Qizbech's son was brought back dead. Qizbech's friend Kerekhuqo advised him to withdraw the army and carry out the procedures for his son's funeral. After thinking in sadness for a while, Qizbech said that the death of a single soldier would not cause the army to retreat. He turned to his soldiers and said that each of them was like his own son and he grieved for them the same way, then said this was the only thing that could be done for his son. Following this, they attacked the fortress again, where the Cossacks who were preparing to pursue the Circassians were located, defeated the Cossack army and in the battle Qizbech was wounded three times and returned to his son's body.

In October 1839, Qizbech attacked Yekatirininske Fortress. Qizbech was seriously injured during the assault on the same fortress in December. The fortresses built by Russia on the Circassian coast didn't allow Ottoman and British ships to dock. Russian armies landed thousands of soldiers on the shore and built 17 fortresses in a short time. The Circassians attacking the fortresses under construction were unsuccessful due to artillery fire opened from the ships. Food shortages, blockade, and epidemic diseases led the Circassians to think that dying in battlefield was better than dying from starving or illness, prompting them to launch major attacks on the Russian fortresses. Meanwhile, despite being severely wounded and under care, Qizbech acted against the warnings of the healers and sent messengers to the various Circassian leaders, then went to the Ubykhs. In February 1840, the Ubykh leader Gerandiqo Berzeg, the Natukhaj leader Hawduqo Mansur, Qizbech from the Shapsugs, and Hajji Yismel from the Abzakhs gathered for a meeting and secretly determined to destroy the coastal fortresses. In 1840, Qizbech, heading a group of Circassian cavaliers, captured the garrisons of Waya, Tuapse and Shaps. Despite his old age. Qizbech did not retire from military affairs.

The song written for Qizbech by the Circassian bard Osman the Blind, who was a contemporary of Qizbech, goes like this:

The full moon is the hilt of his helmet,

His bow is never broken.

Qizbech loves to fight with a sword,

He knocks down his enemies with a mighty spear.

He is fearless even against a great army,

Always a partner ready for victory.

He removes the wounded from the battlefield,

Among men, he is a lion.

He frees the prisoners, and his two sons are like eagles,

To see him is a dream of the Circassian princes.

The Russian Tsar hears of his glory,

The Sultan of Egypt sends him greetings...

=== Fame ===
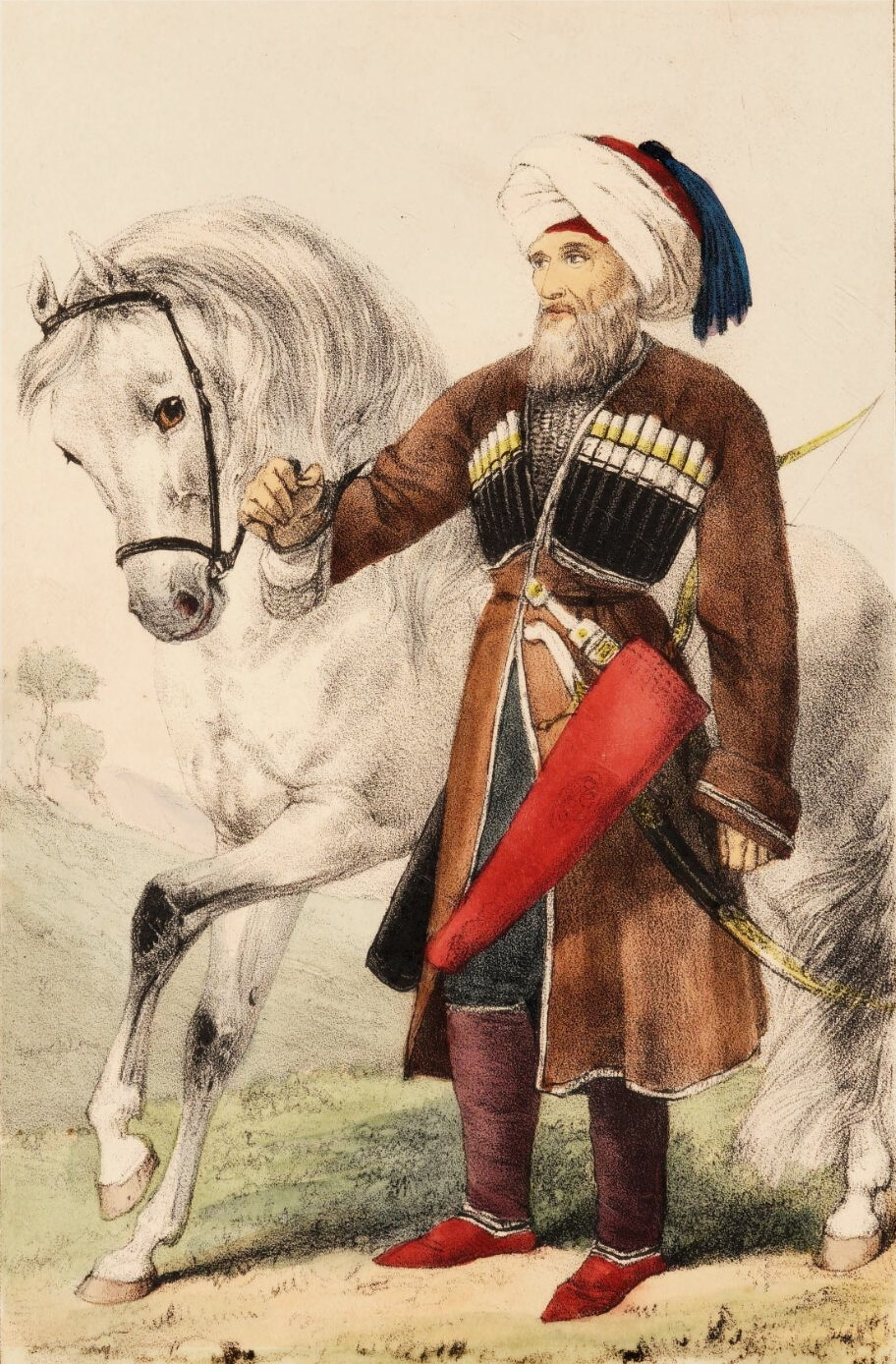
Full portrait by Bell

In oral tradition, songs and ballads were composed in his name. These were unusual because they were written and sung while he was still alive and were witnessed by Qizbech himself. In these songs, he is referred to as the "Lion of the Nation" (Adyghe: Лъэпкъым иаслъан). The Englishman James Bell, who knew him personally, recorded this nickname as "The Lion of Circassia". He is also called the "Lion of the Northwest Caucasus" in other sources. Other variants include "Hajji Lion" and "Lion of the Circassian War".

British adventurer James Bell was impressed by the courage of Qizbech. He witnessed the fear in the hearts of Russian soldiers when hearing Qizbech's name, and how they dispersed before him after they had seen him. Bell said that Qizbech had crossed the Kuban River into Russian territory "annually and almost monthly," consistently bringing back captured Russian horses and spoils.

Russian General Olshevsky wrote:

"Shapsugs are considered the fiercest and most dangerous inhabitants of the coasts of the Black Sea... The Shapsugs were able, thanks to courage and fortitude, to defend themselves and their land, which was proven by inflicting great losses on us, in all cases our forces had to fight them. Among them were strong leaders on the For example, Sheretluqo Qizbech Tughuzhuqo".

— General Melenty Yakovlevich Olshevsky

=== Death ===
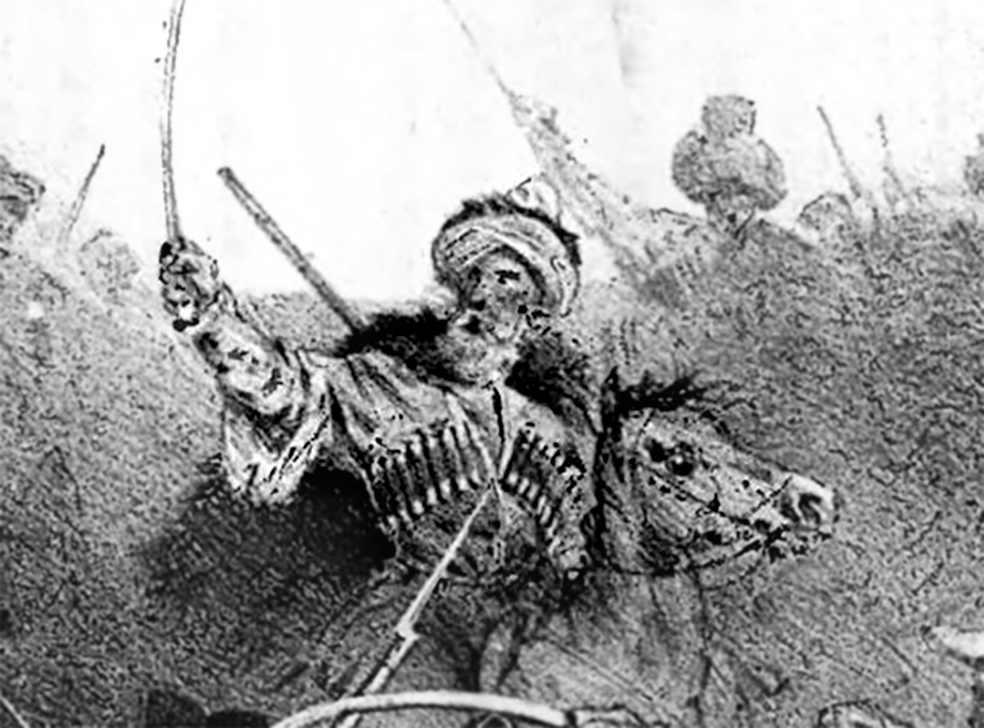
The depiction of Qizbech in the artwork "The Fall of Velyaminovsky Fortress."

Qizbech Tughuzhuqo died of wounds received in action on February 28, 1840, during the Siege of Veliaminovsky. He had six different fatal wounds at the time. Some other sources claim he died in battle. According to other sources, he died on December 12, 1839 or March 12, 1840. Oral history recorded his final words:

I am content with the life I have lived. What I have witnessed here today is a great honor and immense happiness for me. With God's will, the work we have started will not remain unfinished. My life was not in vain. The Circassians have united. They have become one heart, one fist. The victory we have won here today is one of the greatest victories. I take the honor of swinging my sword in such a great victory. I have done all I could. My time has come. Without turning back from my cause, I am going to meet Allah as a martyr. The sea is salty, but the fish living in that sea has no trace of salt in its body. Do not be deceived by worldly goods and make a mistake. They will do everything they can to deceive you, offering you wealth and possessions. We must live our religion and Khabze in purity, without abandoning our ablution and prayer. They will ensure that we live as a nation. If our lands are occupied by the infidels, our sacred cause will not be realized. You see the lives of our brothers deceived by the infidels. They coveted worldly goods and abandoned Allah. Do not fear death, for it will come to everyone.

According to oral sources, two more people were buried next to his grave, in accordance with his will. After his death, he appeared in Cossack legends as a figure that haunted the Cossacks. In Circassian legends, he was a figure dressed in white with armor who supported the Circassians in battles.

== Private life and hobbies ==
Qizbech was born into a family of seven children. In the later years of his life, he witnessed the death of his children in the war. He was a devout Muslim and made the pilgrimage to Mecca. James Bell mentioned that Qizbech loved music. There is also information that he loved dancing and sang well. According to oral sources, Qizbech's horse was named Gu'ale (ГуIалэ). The name is derived from the Circassian word meaning "beany" "eager" or "restless". Sources report that the Russian Tsar wanted a photograph of Qizbech and tried to buy it, but Qizbech refused.

== Legacy ==
In 2014, in the 150th anniversary of the end of Russo-Circassian War, a group of Circassian nationalists organized the constructing a monument of Qizbech in the village of Afipsip. As of June 2015 the fundraising was completed and the statue was built. The Republic of Turkey created a postage stamp in memory of Qizbech.

== See also ==
- Russo-Circassian War
