= James Bell (adventurer) =

British military intelligence officer

James Stanislaus Bell
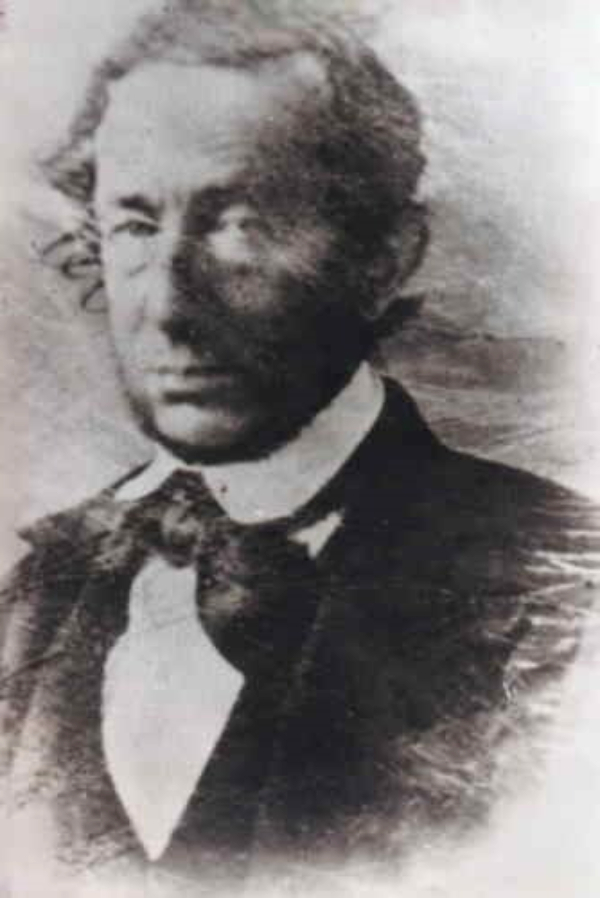
- Born: 9 January 1797; Dundee, Scotland
- Died: 10 March 1858 (aged 61) Glasgow, Scotland
- Allegiance: Circassia
- Conflicts: Russo-Circassian War; Mission of the Vixen
- Spouse: Elizabeth Roberton
- Children: 8

James Stanislaus Bell (Scots: James Bell; Adyghe: Джеймс Белл; 9 January 1797, Dundee – 16 March 1858), also known as Yaqub Bey (Adyghe: Якъуб-Бий), was a British merchant, adventurer, and author. He travelled to Circassia in the 1830s and participated in the Russo-Circassian War on the side of the Circassians. During this time, he wrote and published his memoirs.

== Biography ==
=== Early life ===
He was born in Dundee in 1796. His father was William Bell, and his mother was Anna Young. He had a career as a merchant.

=== Arrival in Circassia ===
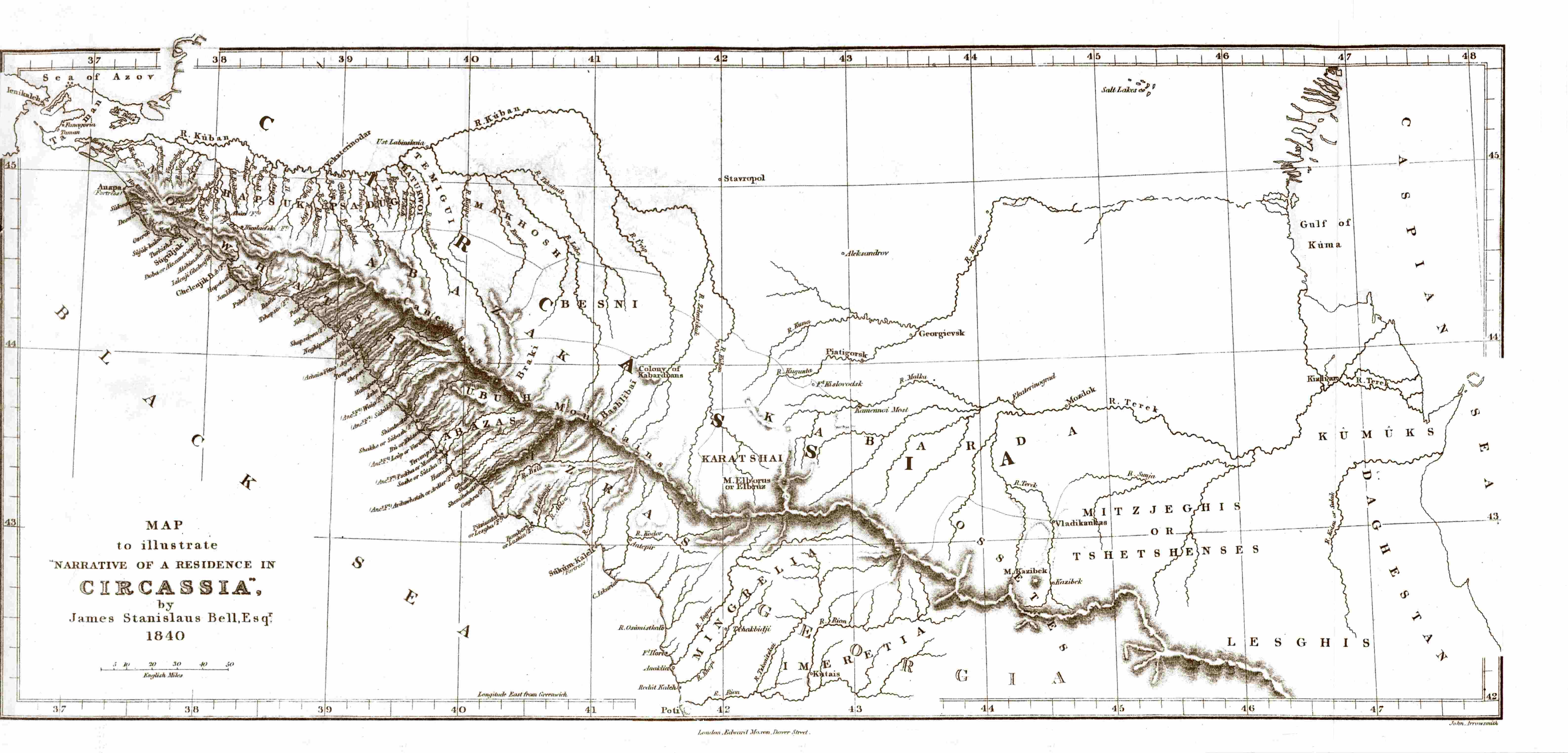
Bell's map of Circassia

Due to its location, Circassia was a key strategic region in the middle of a power struggle between Russia, the United Kingdom, France, and the Ottoman Empire. Russia aimed to expand along the Black Sea and reach warm water ports. The United Kingdom, on the other hand, wanted to block Russia. Russia wanted to isolate the Circassians from the international community, but trade with Circassia could not be prevented, and both the Ottoman Empire and the United Kingdom provided the Circassians with firearms and ammunition to fight the Russians. The United Kingdom also provided several advisors, while the Ottomans tried to persuade the Circassians to start a Holy War (Jihad) that would attract the support of other nations.

James Bell arrived in Circassia in 1836, on board a ship carrying a large quantity of weapons under the guise of commercial activities. In November 1836, the Russian military brig "Ajax" detained Bell's ship at Sujuk-Kale (Adyghe: ЦIэмэз). At the time of the detention, 8 guns, 28,800 pounds of gunpowder, and a significant amount of other weapons were unloaded. This was considered a provocation instigated by David Urquhart, the first secretary of the British embassy in Istanbul, who had long been trying to support the Circassians. Bell introduced himself as a diplomat and saved his life, but the ship and cargo were confiscated and incorporated into the Russian Black Sea fleet. London reacted furiously to this detention. The Conservatives brought a question to Parliament regarding the legality of Russia's claim to Circassia. Russia was threatened with war. Following the angry statements from London, Russian Tsar Nicholas I ordered the army and the fleet to be ready for war, thus bringing the two countries to the brink of war. According to the 20 December 1836 issue of The Morning Chronicle, the purpose of the Vixen was "to lift the illegal and piratical blockade established by Russia on the coast of Circassia."

Left without a ship, Bell remained in Circassia. He wasted no time and assisted the Circassians in military affairs. When it was revealed that someone introducing himself as a British diplomat was helping the Circassians, the crisis between Russia and Britain escalated. By 1840, with the support of Polish deserters trained by Bell, several attacks were organized against Russian fortifications on the Black Sea and Gelendzhik cordon lines. These attacks included the Siege of Lazarevsky, the Siege of Mikhailovsky, and the Siege of Velyaminovsky. The Circassians used military tactics taught to them by Bell, such as using cannons, in later battles. In April 1837, Russian-British relations improved and Urquhart was recalled to London.

== Personal life ==
His eldest daughter was Emilia (Emelia), and his son was Charles Bell (Charles Napier Bell, 1835–1906).
