= Siege of Lazarevsky =

1840 siege during the Russo-Circassian War

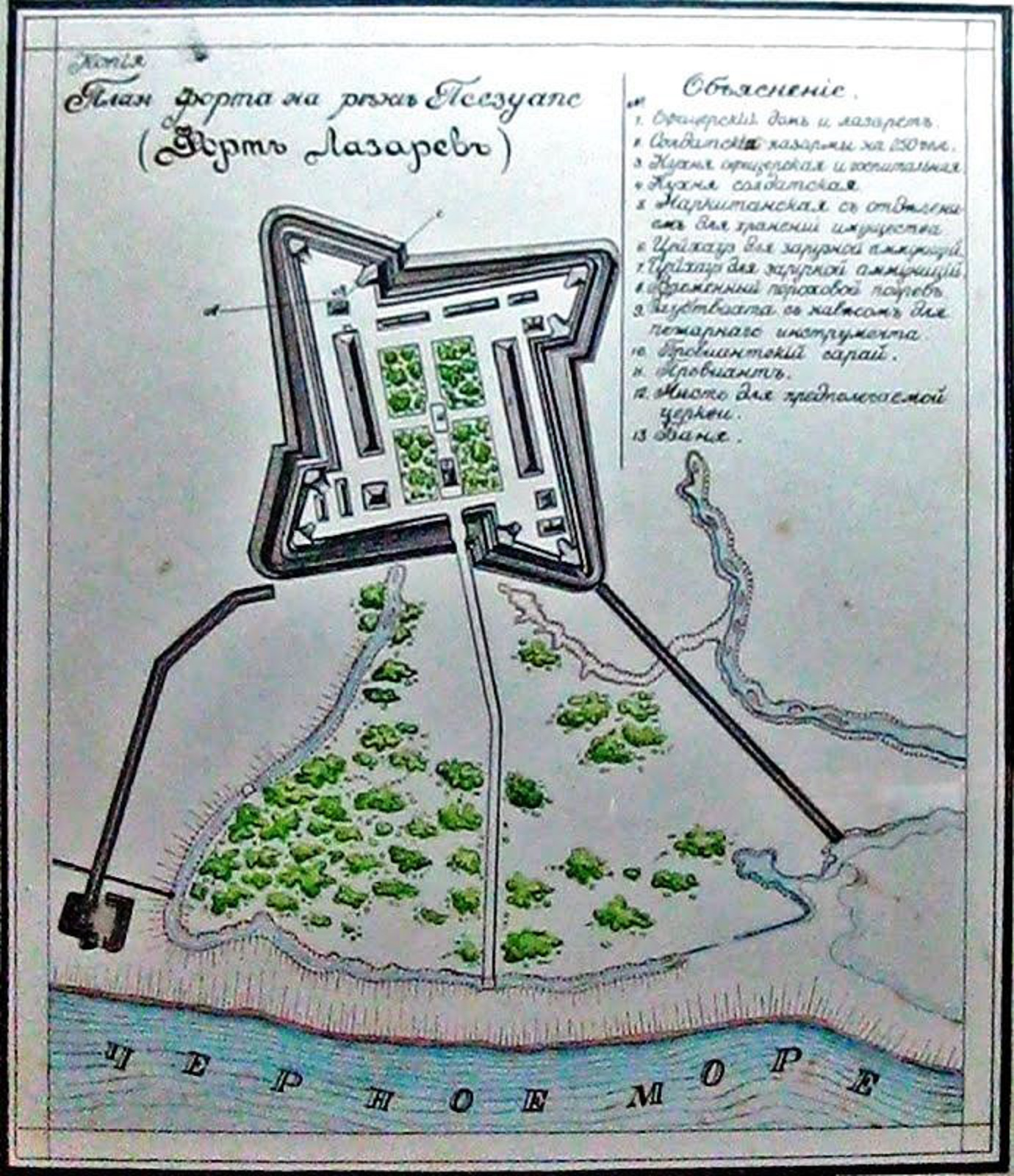
Date	19 February 1840
Location	Lazarevsky fortification, Black Sea coast
Result	Circassian victory

Belligerents
Circassia	Russia

Commanders and leaders
Ismail Berzeg; Qizbech Tughuzhuqo; Qerzech Shirikhuqo; Hawduqo Mansur; Musa Shogen; Beslan Berzeg; Mehmed-Ali Zigiqo †	(Russia) Captain Marchenko † (Russia) Lieutenant P. Fedorov (Russia) Lieutenant V. Fedorov (Russia) Lieutenant Burachkov (Russia) Cornet Cherkobayev

Units involved
Ubykh units Shapsug units Abzakh units Natukhai units	(Russian Empire) Russian artillery units (Russian Empire) Russian cavalry units (Russian Empire) Russian infantry units Cossack raiders

Strength
1,000 Circassians	~200-man garrison 8 Guns

Casualties and losses
150	200

The Siege of Lazarevsky (Adyghe: Уае зау; Russian: Оборона Лазаревского форта) took place on the night of 19 February 1840 (7 February O.S) during the Russo-Circassian War. Before the siege, the Circassians engaged in intense intelligence activities. After a 3-hour struggle, the Lazarevsky fortification was captured by the Circassians.

== History ==
=== Background ===
Since the early 1830s, the Russians had been landing on the Black Sea coast of Circassia and building fortifications. The Russians built the Lazarevsky fortification in 1839 on the eastern coast of the Black Sea, at the mouth of the Psezuapse River. The garrison of Fort Lazarevsky consisted of the 4th Musketeer Company of the Tenginsky Infantry Regiment and a Cossack Raider Company of the Azov Cossack Host. The fortification also had 8 different cannons and defensive weapons.

=== Circassian intelligence activities ===
In December 1839, Circassian spy Musa Shogen infiltrated the Russian army using a fake identity. Despite being Circassian, he played the role of a man who hated Circassians due to personal reasons and blood feuds. He also brought a fake family (a woman) with him. Over time, he gained the Russian commander's trust and was accepted into the Russian army. To curry favor with the Russians, he pretended to steal horses and livestock from the Circassian army. Musa Shogen continued his duty for three months, increasing his reputation among Russian authorities to gain ranks, while simultaneously gathering information. Another Circassian agent had been on duty for a long time and had formed a friendship with the Russian commander of the fortification. He frequently attended banquets and events. During this time, he had the opportunity to gather information about the armament inside the fortification. Russian agents later discovered two other Circassian agents who had infiltrated the fortification and gathered information. However, before they were caught, they had already delivered important information to the Circassians.

=== Siege ===
On the night of 19 February 1840, Musa Shogen sneaked out of the Russian fortification and returned to the Circassians. At dawn, he guided the Circassian army under the command of Ismail Berzeg to the fortification. Infiltrating the fortification, he silently killed the guards at the gate. Then, together with other Circassians who sneaked in, he killed 15 more guards. Swiftly, the Circassians stormed the fortification while reciting prayers and began to climb the walls. Captain Marchenko, taking Lieutenants Burachkov and Fedorov with him, divided the Russian units into three groups and rushed to attack the three fronts occupied by the Circassians. The Circassians opened heavy rifle fire, killing more than half of the Russians. The remaining Russians ran and hid behind the barracks. The Circassians chased after them, and hand-to-hand combat began. The battle lasted no more than 15 minutes, and the entire Russian garrison was "killed where they stood".

Meanwhile, on the opposite side, 10 Russian soldiers had managed to overpower a group of Circassians and throw them down. However, according to Russian commander D. V. Rakovich, this was a "temporary success" because the Circassians had already captured most of the fortification. Russian commander Marchenko planned to escape to avoid being surrounded by the Circassians and jumped from the back wall into the epaulement-covered trench connecting the fortification with the blockhouse, but he was confronted by Circassians there. Afterwards, Marchenko tried to attack the Circassians but was overpowered and "hacked" to death by the Circassians. During this time, the Circassians set fire to strategic hiding spots. Some of the Russian soldiers hiding there escaped, while the rest burned to death. A group of Russians redirected the cannons in the fortification and subjected the Circassians to artillery fire. However, they were later shot by the Circassians.

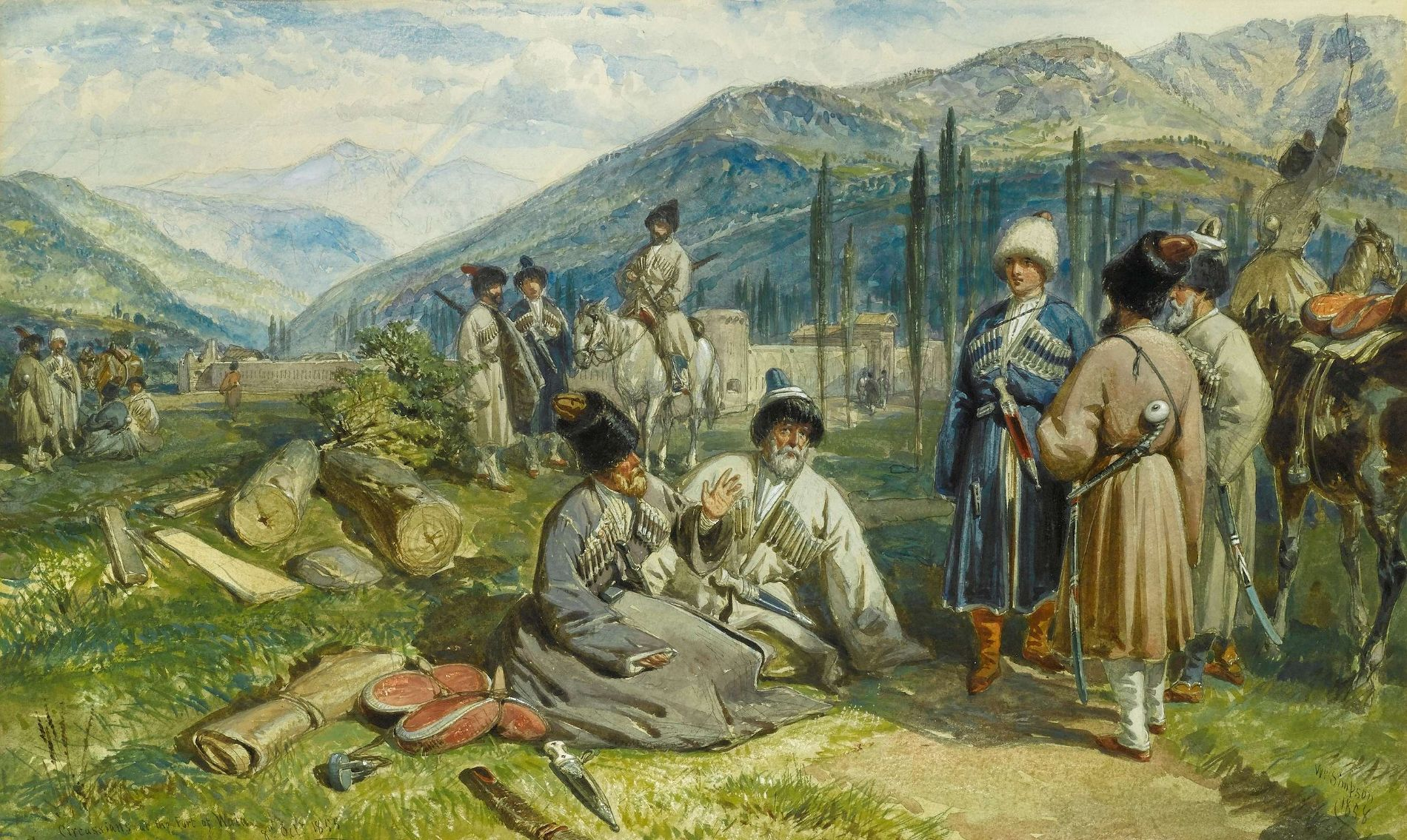
Circassians at the Lazarevsky Fort (Waia)

A group of Cossacks under the command of Cornet Cherkobayev, belonging to the Azov Cossack Host, defended themselves for a long time in the blockhouse located between the sea and the fortification. They repelled two Circassian attacks by returning fire with rifles from the embrasures of the blockhouse and managing to fire 10 rounds with their cannons. During the third attack, the Circassians set the blockhouse on fire. Half of the Cossacks died, while the other half were taken prisoner.

After a 3-hour battle, the fortification was captured by the Circassians. Afterwards, the bodies of the Circassian dead were collected and buried. The Russian bodies were left to the Russians.

=== Aftermath ===
Captain Marchenko, commander of the 4th Musketeer Company of the Tenginsky Infantry Regiment, was the military commandant of Fort Lazarevsky at the time. Despite dying during the defense, the defeat was blamed on him, and he was criticized for showing a humiliating performance in defending the fortification.

However, the Circassians were not entirely satisfied with this result either. Expecting a now-traditional "punitive expedition" from the Russians, the Circassians of the surrounding villages began packing their belongings and moving to the mountains in the early hours of the morning. On 28 May, a large Russian detachment massacred 12 Circassian villages in a punitive expedition, after which the Circassians of other villages fled deeper into the mountains.
