= Qerzech Shirikhuqo =

Circassian military commander

Qerzech "Tuguzh" Shirikhuqo
- Къерзэч Шырыхъукъо Тыгъужъ
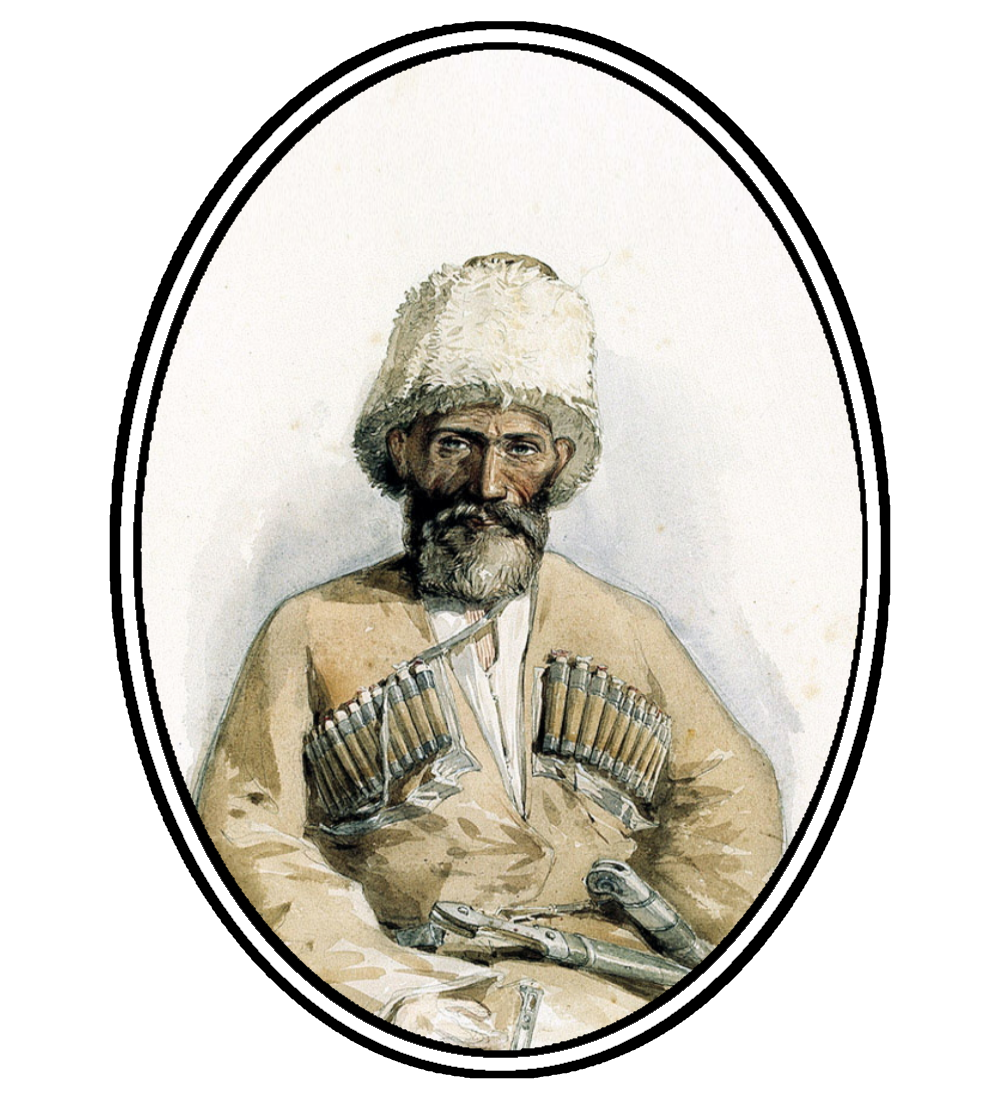

Nobleman of the Natukhaj

Personal details
- Born: 1799 Natukhaj, Circassia
- Died: 1880 (aged 80–81) Ottoman Empire
- Nickname(s): The Wolf; Lionheart

Military service
- Allegiance: Circassian Confederation: Natukhajia
- Battles/wars: Russo-Circassian War

Qerzech "The Wolf" Shirikhuqo (Adyghe: Къерзэч Шырыхъукъо Тыгъужъ; Russian: Тугуж Шурухуко Керзек; 1799–1880?) was a Circassian military commander and a nobleman of the Natukhaj region who participated in the Russo-Circassian War.

== Biography ==
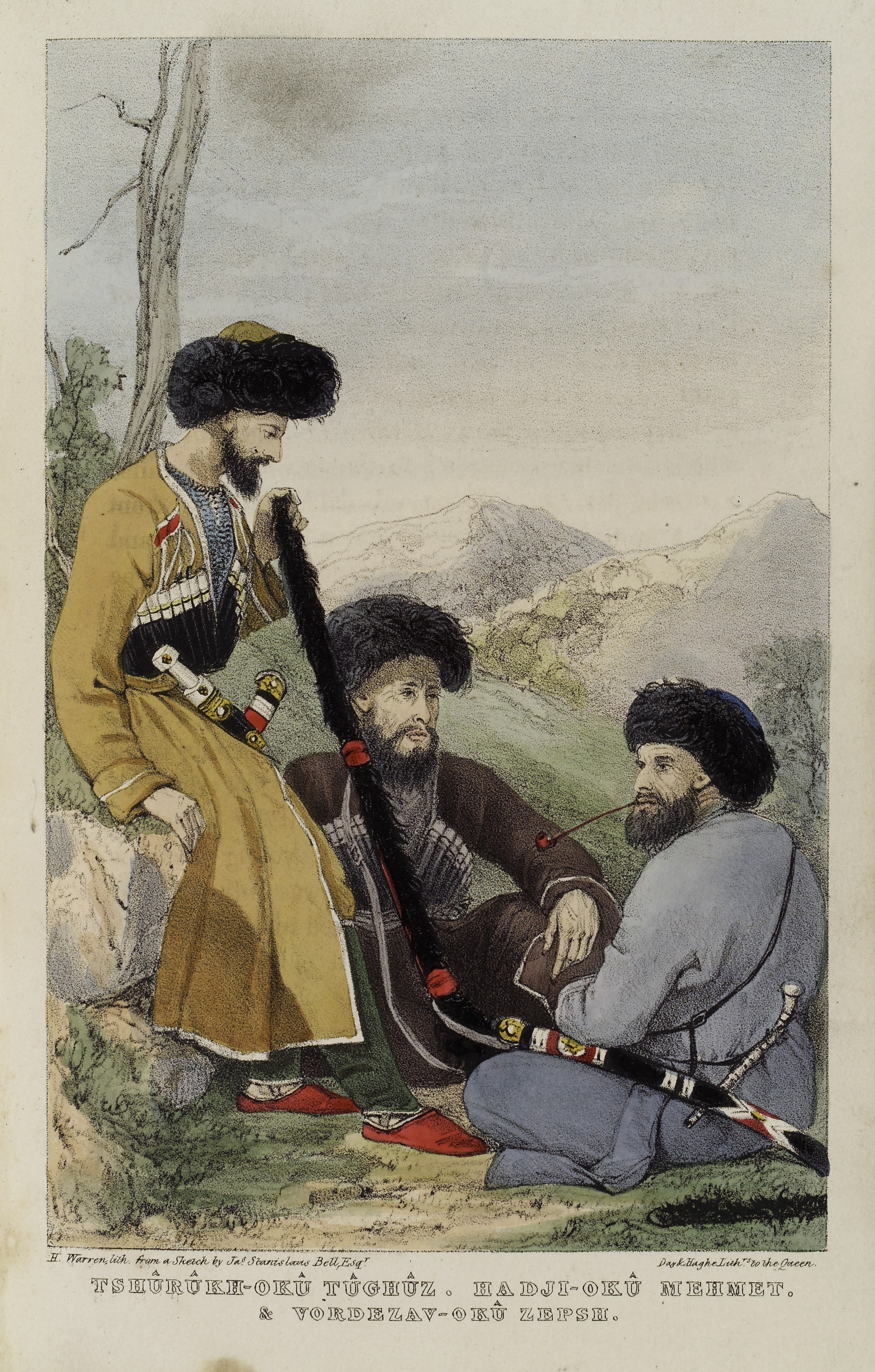
Qerzech Tuguzh Shirikhuqo on the left

He was involved in battles since his youth. Just like the Yecheniqo brothers, he always rushed to fight against the Russians, save villages from Russian occupation and free captives. The detachment led by him took active part in the battles of 1840, in which the Black Sea coastline was invaded by Russia. Because of his bravery, he became the hero of many legends and historical songs. His martial arts, military genius and incomparable courage brought him great fame not only in the Caucasus, but also (thanks to foreign representatives) in European states. In the memories of the British, he appears as a very colorful figure, a fearless knight with an indomitable character. James Bell named him "Richard the Lionhearted Circassian".

He was exiled to the Ottoman lands during the Circassian genocide and died there in 1880.

=== Descriptions ===
James Bell, who knew him personally very well, had this to say about him:

A nobleman of middle age, and most gallant presence, in whom my countrymen and I had always involuntarily felt much interest (as you may have already seen), on account of the undaunted courage, the enterprise, the princely generosity, and extreme liveliness of his character.

Bell followed him from hiding and had this to say:

He is a remarkably strong-made, tall man, full of life, fun, and activity; and as he slowly paced along, so distinct an object in the midst of an open field, I thought of our Coeur-de-Lion (Richard the Lionheart) challenging the Saracens, yet I wished the scene at an end, for the interest it excited was too painful, especially as Tughuz "The Wolf" and I had become very good friends.

== Sources ==
- Bell, vol 1, James Stanislaus (1840). Journal of a Residence in Circassia During the Years 1837, 1838, and 1839. Vol. 1. London: E. Moxon. LCCN 05007319. OCLC 3417637.
- Bell, vol 2, James Stanislaus (1840). Journal of a Residence in Circassia During the Years 1837, 1838, and 1839. Vol. 2. London: E. Moxon. LCCN 05007319. OCLC 3417637.
