= Bziyiqo War =

War between Bzhedug-Shapsug aristocrats and commoner militia

Bziyiqo War Shapsug-Bzhedug War
- Part of the Circassian Revolution
- Tactical map of the Battle of Bziyiqo
Date	Wider conflict: 1792–1803 Battle of Bziyiqo: 10 July [O.S. 29 June] 1796
Location	Najida Pasture, Bziyiqo River Valley, Circassia; Near Novodmitrievskaya 44°50′24.09″N 38°53′43.34″E
Result	Battle of Bziyiqo: Aristocratic victory Wider conflict: Peasant victory (see § Aftermath): Nobility forced to accept the peasants' terms; Circassian society divided into two main groups: aristocratic and democratic; Heated tensions accelerate the Circassian Revolution

Belligerents
Aristocratic coalition: Bzhedug Principalities; Khimishiy; Cherchenay; Shapsug nobility; House of Sheretluqo; House of Abat; and others...; Russian Empire	Commoner militia: Shapsugs; Natukhajs; Abzakhs; and others...; Diplomatic support: Ottoman Empire

Commanders and leaders
Batcheriy Hajemuqo †; Alqas Hajemuqo; Hajequl Mizaghi; Wudjukh; Biyushkh Kheuseqo; Qutas Hatita (Russian Empire) Capt. Timofey Yeremeyev and others...	Mos Haghur †; Ahmed Shupako †; Nepasho Thakhuakho and others...

Strength
3,000–5,000	10,000–12,000

Casualties and losses
Unknown approx. 2,000 killed according to Autlev	Total: 4,300–6,300: • 2,000–4,000 killed; • 2,000 wounded; • at least 300 captured; 800 horses captured
- Location of the battle within Krasnodar Krai

The Bziyiqo War (Adyghe: Бзыикъо зау), also known as the Shapsug-Bzhedug War (Adyghe: Шапсыгъ-Бжъэдыгъу зау), 1792 to 1803, was a socio-political conflict in the Circassian Revolution centered around the Battle of Bziyiqo on 10 July 1796. The sides were composed of an aristocratic coalition of Bzhedug princes and exiled Shapsug nobility, supported by the Russian Empire, against a peasant alliance.

The conflict began in 1792 when Shapsug commoners revolted against the feudal nobility, stripping them of judicial authority and 250 to 300 aristocrats fled to Bzhedug territory. When Shapsug commoners demanded the extradition of the exiled nobles as criminals, Bzhedug ruler Prince Batcheriy Hajemuqo refused, citing the duty of hospitality under the Adyghe Khabze. Batcheriy obtained military aid from Empress Catherine II of Russia by warning of a republican movement, while Ottoman officials in Anapa encouraged the commoner uprising through principles of Islamic equality. The Battle of Bziyiqo took place on 10 July 1796 at Najida Pasture in the Bziyiqo River valley. The battle ended in a tactical victory for the aristocracy and caused heavy casualties, including the deaths of prominent leaders on both sides. Although the nobility won the battle, the result was a Pyrrhic victory.

The aristocracy lost centralized leadership and did not restore feudal control. Ongoing peasant raids and clashes in Bzhedug led both sides into negotiations that ended with the Psichetiqo Assembly of 1803. The settlement abolished noble judicial privileges, equalized legal rights, and established a governance system led by elected assemblies. The conflict divided Western Circassia into aristocratic and democratic societies.

A primary cause of the military escalation was a conflicting interpretation of the Adyghe Khabze: the Shapsug commoners demanded the extradition of the nobles as criminals, while the Bzhedug princes refused, arguing the sacred duty of hospitality within the same Khabze made it impossible for them to hand over their guests.

== Background ==
=== Social structure and stratification ===
By the late 18th century, the Shapsug, Natukhaj, and Abzakh regions of Circassia operated under a tiered social system governing land use and labor. These areas lacked a prince class and were instead led by first-rank nobles known as tleqotlesh (лIэкъолъэш). In Shapsugia, the first-rank noble Sheretluqo and Abat clans held the most administrative and military authority, maintaining control over judicial processes and regional assemblies from which commoners were excluded. The largest population group consisted of free peasants called feqotl (фэкъолI). While legally free, they relied on the aristocracy for protection in exchange for agricultural services. Tensions rose as the nobility attempted to expand feudal control by converting communal customs into mandatory labor and taxes, including requirements for plowing, harvesting, and haymaking to support aristocratic estates. Economic shifts led to the emergence of well-peasants (фэкъолIышIу), who accumulated grain, livestock, and slaves. Some attained wealth comparable to the lower nobility, further complicating the hierarchy. At the base of the structure, an unfree population of serfs and slaves provided manual labor for both the hereditary nobility and wealthy commoners. Five primary levels of conflict drove the subsequent uprising. These included contradictions between the nobility and their serfs, wealthy peasants and their laborers, and the competing interests of hereditary clans against the rising class of wealthy commoners. An extra friction existed between wealthy peasants and the traditional aristocracy over political influence. However the primary factor in the conflict was the collective opposition of peasant groups to the nobility's efforts to establish total feudal authority.

Western Circassian societies were characterized by a decentralized and democratic feudal system where the princely class held less power than in Kabardian regions. The core social unit was the quadje (village community), which operated as a self-sufficient entity within a federation of independent communities. The Battle of Bziyiqo originated from this structure, as the peasantry used their collective influence to challenge feudal authority.

=== Rise of the sworn brotherhoods ===
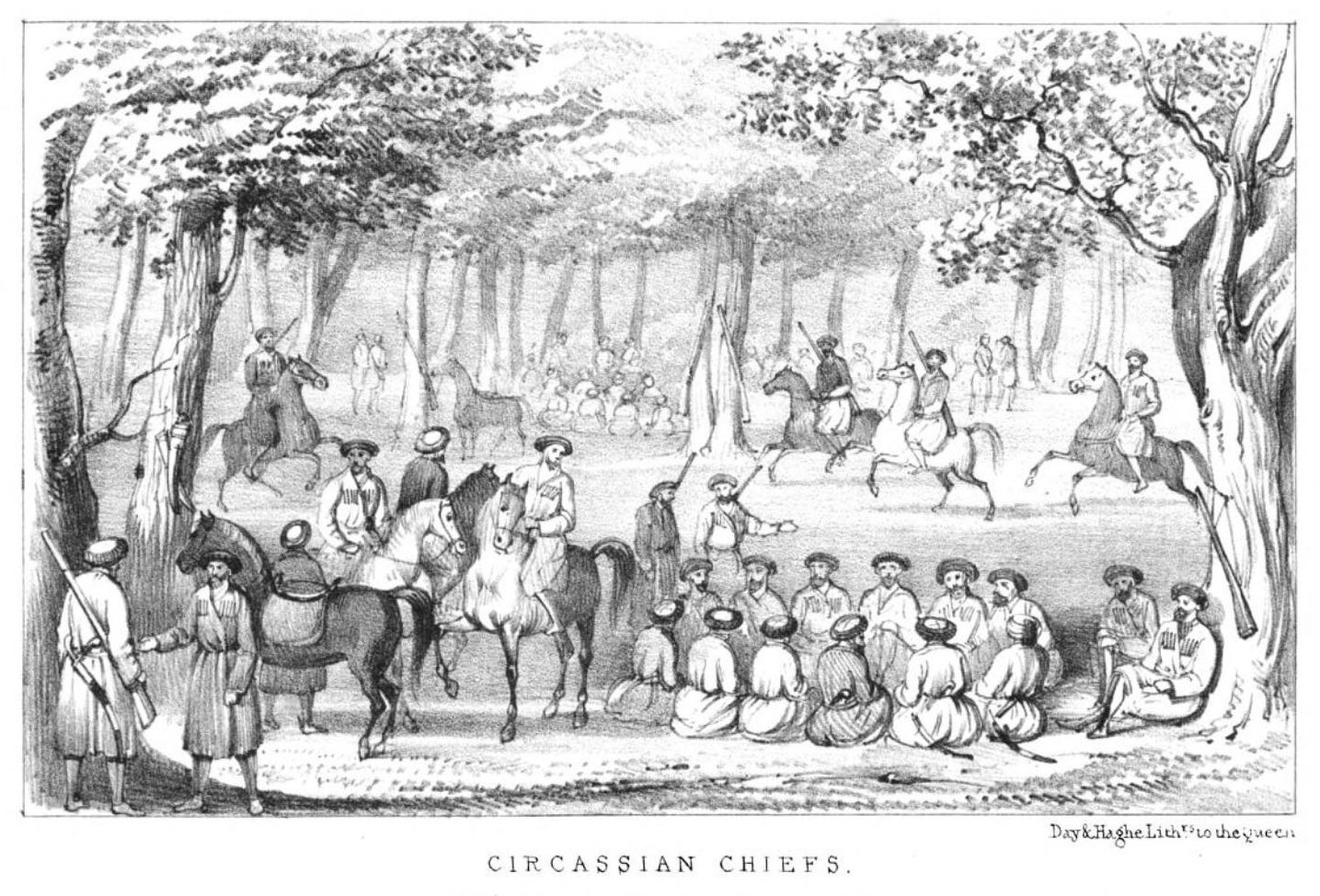
Circassian Chiefs, by Longworth

The sworn brotherhoods (Adyghe: ЗэтхьарIогъу, lit. 'Mutual oath-ship') emerged as collective unions in response to aristocratic pressure. These voluntary alliances functioned as small republics where members from various clans and villages took formal oaths on the Quran. By pledging mutual defense, these organizations consolidated peasant power within Shapsug, Natukhaj, and Abzakh regions.

The primary objective of these brotherhoods was to replace traditional blood feud customs with a unified legal and military front. Through the oath, peasants established their own judges and a parallel administration to resolve internal disputes and enforce communal decisions. Members collectively refused to perform forced labor or pay administrative fees to noble families. Often led by well-peasants, these brotherhoods crossed tribal boundaries to challenge the judicial and economic monopolies of the noble clans.

In the late 18th century, a territorial and economic conflict began between the Sheretluqo and Abat noble clans. The Abat clan, led by Nemere Abat, controlled villages along the Abin, Afips, and Shepsh rivers, while the Sheretluqo clan held authority near the Il River. Tension rose when the Sheretluqo family attempted to expand into Abat controlled areas to secure trade advantages. The conflict intensified after Sheretluqo nobles seized livestock from populations under Abat jurisdiction, which the Abat clan viewed as a violation of traditional borders.

As hostility grew, the Sheretluqo clan increased labor duties and taxes on the local peasantry to fund military preparations. This economic pressure caused the free peasantry to distance themselves from both noble houses. Although the Abat clan attempted to recruit peasant support against the Sheretluqo, the peasants instead formed independent brotherhoods to protect their own interests.

=== Crimes committed by the Sheretluqo Clan ===
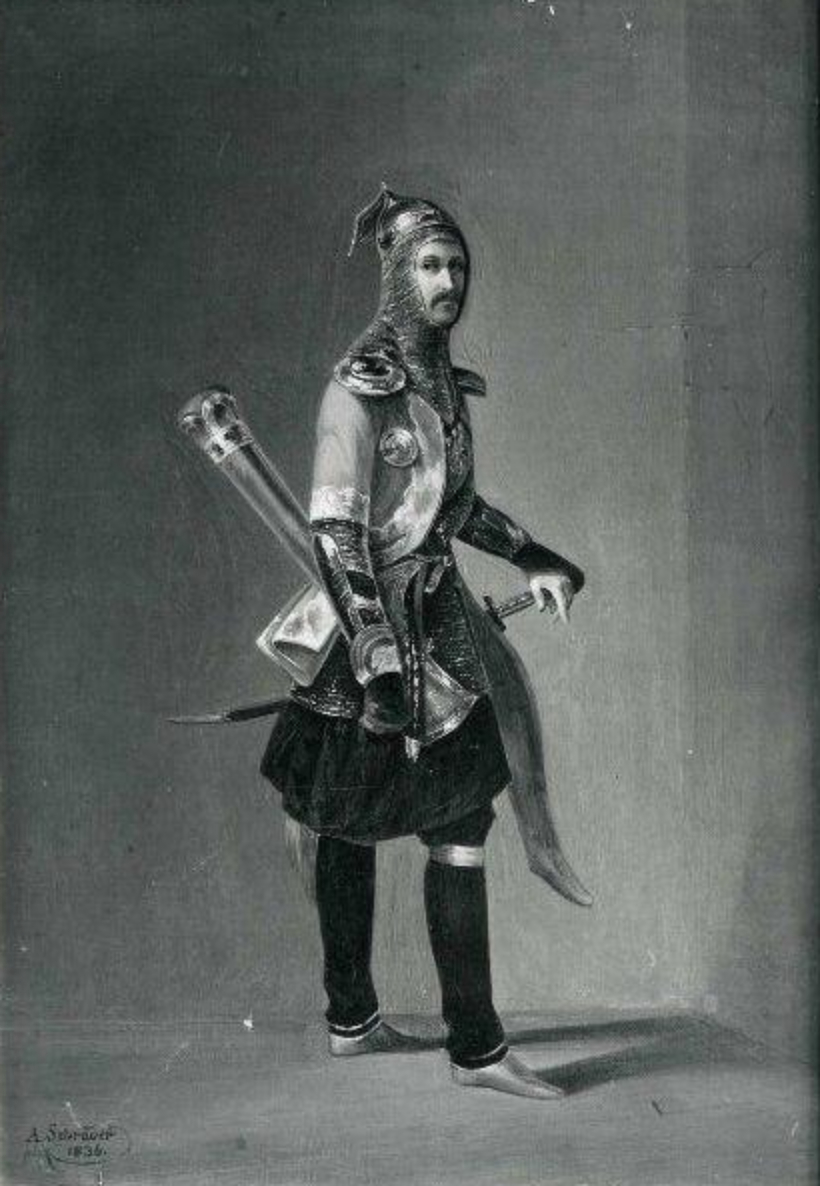
A Circassian nobleman, by Julius Schrader, 1836

The House of Sheretluqo engaged in several actions that violated local customs and legal frameworks. Members of the clan forcibly took back a daughter who had married a commoner. Naghomuqo Sheretluqo killed a commoner during a dispute regarding the ownership of four stacks of hay. Another clan member robbed Armenian merchants and killed two commoner companions, an act that violated regional protocols concerning the protection of guests. The leader of the clan, Alisultan Nijeqo Sheretluqo, claimed the title of prince of the Shapsugs and was noted for his mistreatment towards his serfs.

Feudal practices under the Sheretluqo included the seizure of commoner property, such as horses and cattle, without compensation. Commoners were required to perform labor for the nobility, including plowing, haymaking, and harvesting. The clan imposed various tributes and fines, including specific penalties for perceived slights against noble status. Commoners were also expected to provide food for noble gatherings through established customs. Judicial authority was used to extract property from the peasantry via fines and religious tributes.

Shapsug society initially attempted to address these violations of the Adyghe Khabze through existing legal frameworks. Despite accusations of theft and the destruction of households, the population did not immediately resort to armed conflict. Oral traditions record numerous instances where resistance to the clan's demands resulted in the killing of individuals and the destruction of homes. These sustained actions eventually led to the revolt against the Sheretluqo clan.

=== Peasant Uprising ===
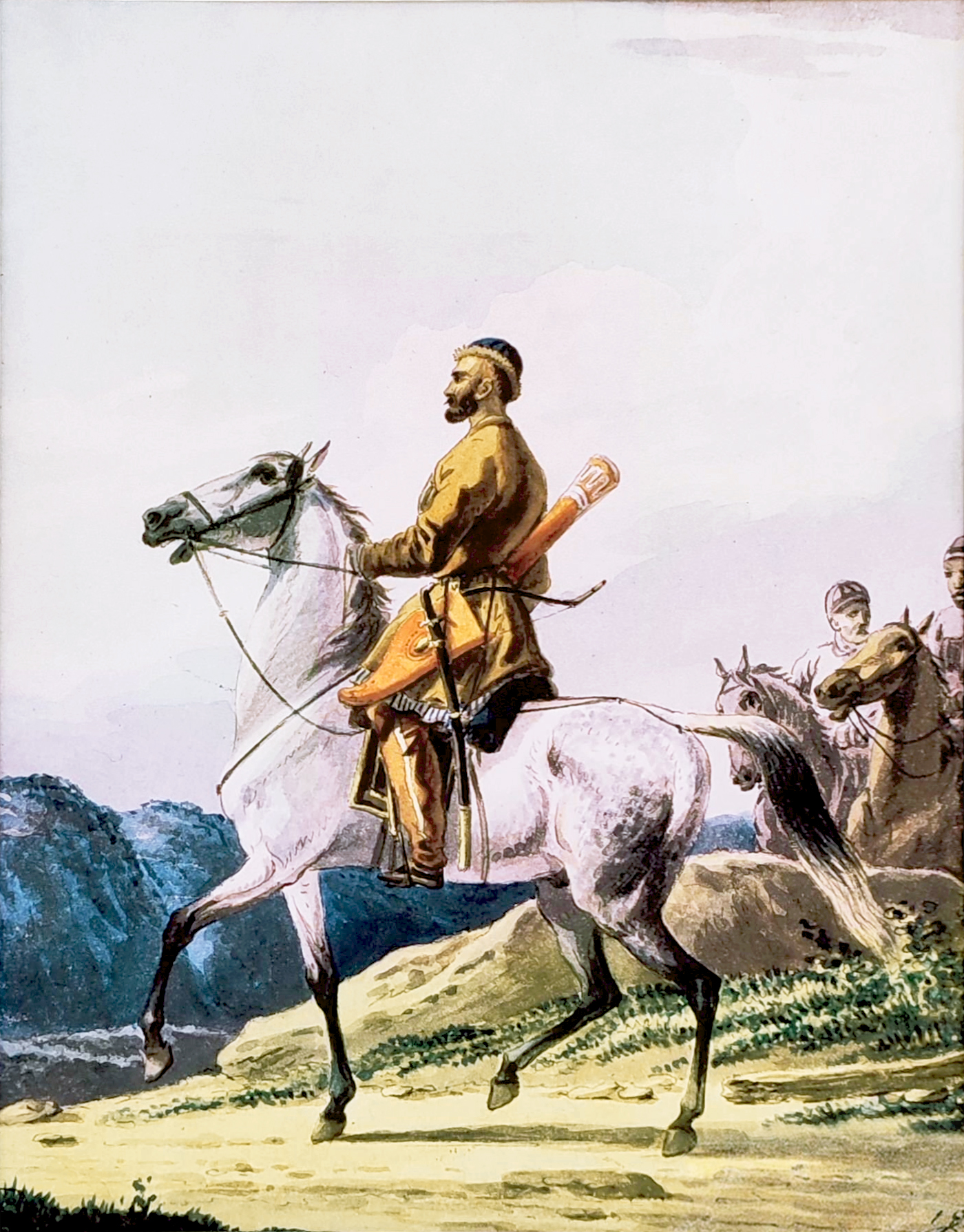
Circassian horseman, by Aleksander Orłowski, 1814

While the Abzakh commoners were the first to successfully strip their nobility of privileges, the movement quickly spread to the Shapsug and Natukhaj tribes. The Shapsug and Natukhaj peasant uprising began in 1792. The withdrawal of Russian forces from the region following the recapture of Anapa provided the opportunity for the movement. Previous incidents led to the uprising against the Sheretluqo clan. Peasants convened an assembly that removed the judicial authority of the nobility and took control of ports. Insurgents attacked the estates of Naghomuqo and Alisultan Nijeqo Sheretluqo, where they released serfs and slaves. Property from these estates was divided among the participants. Naghomuqo Sheretluqo fled to the Bzhedug territory while Alisultan Sheretluqo failed to suppress the movement with his warriors.

The Abat and Sheretluqo clans were the targets of the uprising. The movement resulted in the peasants seizing administrative control of the ports and removing the judicial rights of the nobility. While Natukhaj nobles accepted the changes and remained in their villages, the Shapsug nobility was driven out during this period.

By the end of 1792, the peasant war resulted in a victory for the commoners. They established a new administration governed by peasant assemblies and courts. Judicial and political power transitioned to wealthy commoners. Elected elders and members of the oath unions managed the peasant courts and assemblies.

Approximately 250 to 300 members of the Shapsug nobility had escaped to the Bzhedug lands, whom their princes had close ties with the Shapsug nobles before the conflict, to organize efforts for the restoration of their former judicial status and social rank. Noble clans requested military assistance from Bzhedug princes. Shapsug nobles, who were attacking on their former lands, continued to escalate tensions. The Shapsugs demanded that the Bzhedugs expel these nobles and establish a democratic system like their own. The Shapsugs sent envoys to the Bzhedugs, stating that these individuals were "criminals and murderers who were destroying the foundations of the state" and demanding their extradition.

In the first half of 1793, the Bzhedug prince Batcheriy Hajemuqo first petitioned the Russian administration for support against the peasant movement.

=== Saltuk Assembly (1794) ===
The Saltuk Assembly (Adyghe: Салтыку зэфэс) convened on February 5 [O.S. January 25], 1794, to address the conflict. Notable participants included Crimean Sultans Murat Mosetcheri and Islamcheri Marsutcheri. Khimish (Western Bzhedug) princes Aytech Hajemuqo, Alqas Hajemuqo, Bateqo Hajemuqo, and Batcheriy Hajemuqo. The Cherchenay (Eastern Bzhedug) princes included Memet, Netakho Bechuk, Bechmiz, Shumaf Shikur, Shumaf Tchundeqo, and Jilit. Noble representatives present were Bzhihaqo Boreqo, Ozdemir Sheretluqo, Ismail Bzhedugh, and Amirz Sherdeye. Alisultan Sheretluqo also attended, while the Black Sea Cossack Ataman Zakhary Chepiha sent representatives.

The conference addressed a proposal to send Bzhedug delegates to St. Petersburg and deliberated on the Shapsug peasant uprising, specifically the demand for the surrender of an individual responsible for a murder. Batcheriy Hajemuqo argued against surrendering noblemen to the insurgents and suggested blood money as compensation. Batcheriy viewed protecting the Sheretluqo family as a mandatory duty to guests and to the Adyghe Khabze, while the Shapsugs viewed the Sheretluqo as criminals whose protection violated communal justice, thus the Adyghe Khabze.

Batcheriy's older brother Prince Alqas advocated for surrendering the requested individual to avoid permanent enmity with the Shapsug population: "Let's not make the Shapsugs our enemies for the sake of one person." The assembly disregarded Alqas's suggestion as participants suspected his history since his atalyk was a Shapsug and biased against military action.

Boreqo Bzhihaqo, an old respected Bzhedug nobleman, advised Hajemuqo to return the Shapsug nobles to the Shapsug to avoid a larger war, his speech is recorded in oral history:

As I understand it, if a guest is a proper guest, they should be hosted and protected. However, you cannot protect the Sheretluqos. This is a matter that will bring ruin upon you. The Shapsug (nobles) are the ones who caused these and they are their own nobles. Let them have them back; let them do with them what they intend. They [the Sheretluqos] will bring disaster to both the Shapsug and the Bzhedug. It pains me that the Bzhedug and the Shapsug are going to fight over something that's not worth it.

Batcheriy refused Bzhihaqo's proposals and became angry, viewing the suggestion as an affront to his status:

What kind of people are we if we violate the sacred law of hospitality! Bzhihaqo, if the numerical superiority of the Shapsugs frightens you, put on my hat (take my place).

This exchange was a violation of the moral code of the Circassians, Adyghe Khabze. Hajemuqo's refusal to heed the counsel of an elder and his public humiliation of Bzhihaqo contradicted the social standards of the Khabze. For Hajemuqo to accuse an elder (Bzhihaqo) of cowardice was a grave insult within the Adyghe Khabze framework, equivalent to social exclusion and even death. Batcheriy Hajemuqo was holding a high status and was a respected figure. He believed that returning his guests would violate Adyghe Khabze and damage his reputation. In oral tradition, Hajemuqo stated that surrendering guests would be a disaster and a source of shame. Both the Shapsug and Bzhedug sides were claiming to be defending the principles of Adyghe Khabze from their own perspectives. In oral sources, Batcheriy was stating that if he won the war, he promised to bring the Circassians under Russian rule.

Young noble participants also rejected Bzhihaqo's mediation methods and seen his stance as cowardance. A Sheretluqo representative also dismissed the idea of relying on mediation but acknowledged the support of the aristocracy. The majority of the assembly favored armed intervention to restore noble judicial authority and traditional social hierarchies in the Shapsugia.

The conflict arose from different views of Adyghe Khabze regarding the Sheretluqos. The Shapsug saw the expulsion of the family as an act of Khabze. Batcheriy Hajemuqo believed he had to protect them because they were his guests. He also realized that if he did not protect them, his own Bzhedug people might stop following his authority. He feared that his subjects, who also could want more freedom, would treat him the same way the Shapsug treated their own nobles.

=== Russian involvement ===
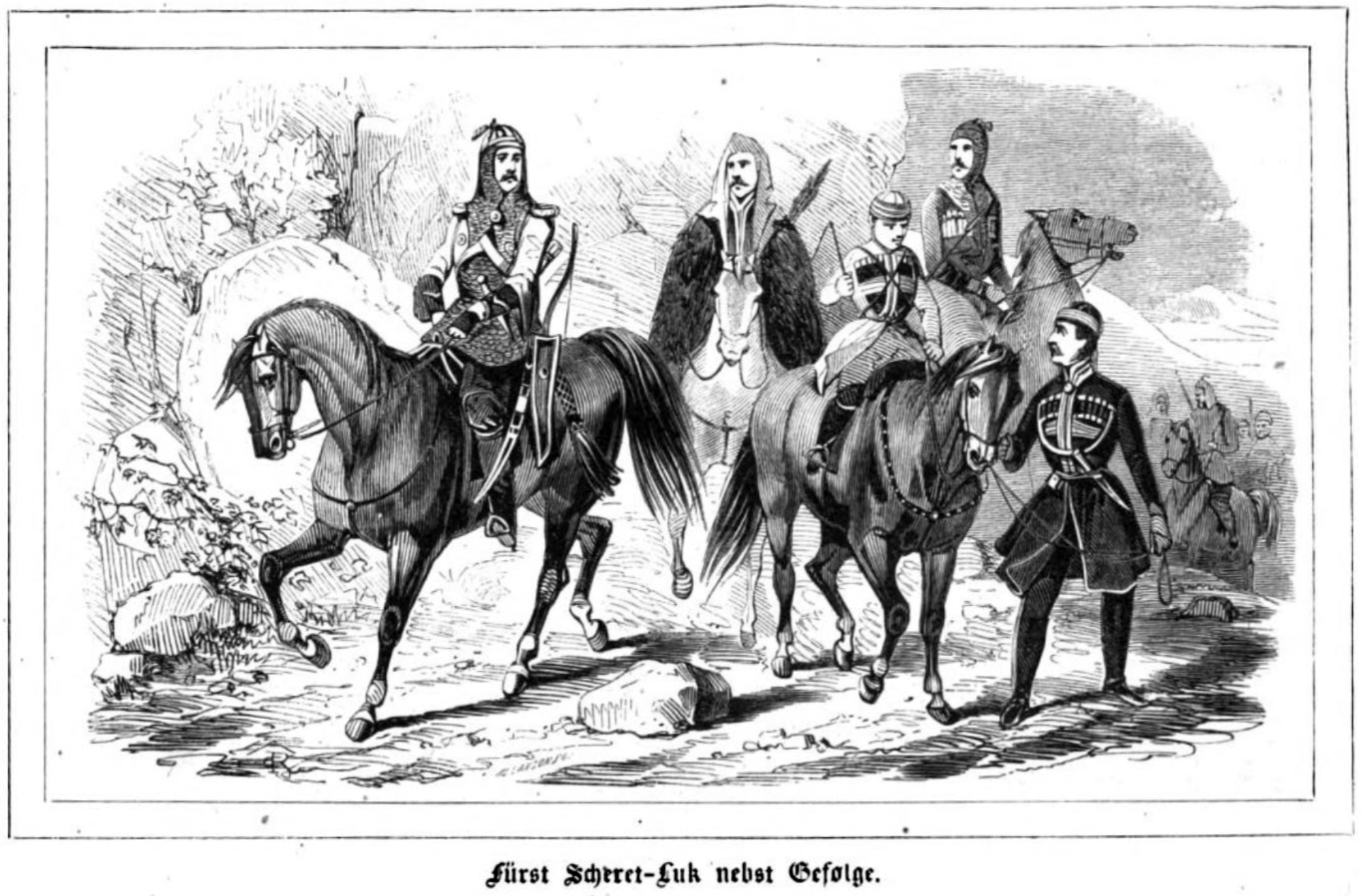
A West Circassian prince and his retinue

In April 1795, a delegation of the Bzhedug nobility traveled to Saint Petersburg to request military intervention from Empress Catherine II against the commoner administration in Shapsug. Prince Batcheriy Hajemuqo led the mission, accompanied by Doletcheri Miguqo and Mehmet Qalebatuqo. During the journey, Alisultan Sheretluqo returned from Simferopol, and Doletcheri Miguqo died in Moscow before the group reached the capital. The delegation formally requested that the Bzhedug lands be accepted as subjects of the Russian Empire and asked for regular military protection against the insurgent commoners. The Russian authorities had been closely monitoring the social movements in the region from the early 1790s.

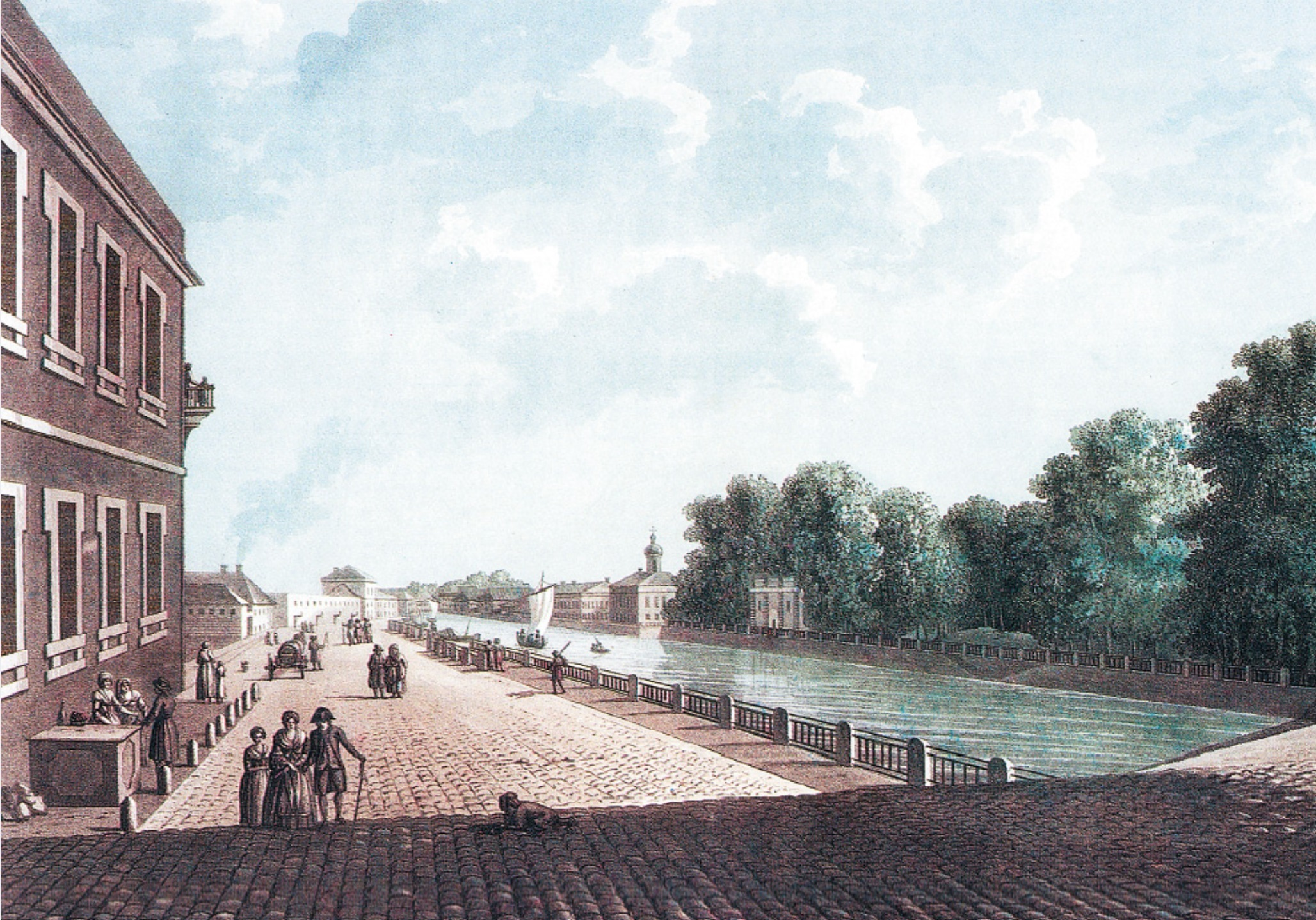
Saint Petersburg in 1790s

While Catherine II received the delegation, she officially declined the request for formal annexation or vassal status to avoid a diplomatic crisis with the Ottoman Empire, as such a move would violate the 1791 Treaty of Jassy. The deletation also warned the Catherine II that their subjects were preparing to "establish a republic in the Trans-Kuban". This statement was intended to stoke Russian fears of the French Revolution. The Empress, "seeing ... a manifestation of the revolutionary spirit of French Jacobinism" guaranteed full military support to the aristocracy to suppress the movement.

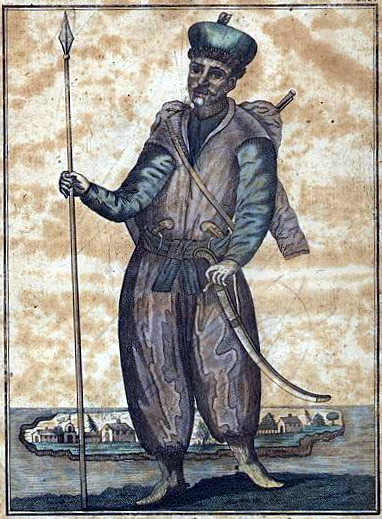
A Black-Sea Cossack, 1781

She provided Batcheriy with an order for Ataman Zakhary Chepiha to mobilize Black Sea Cossack reinforcements. As a further privilege, the Empress granted the Bzhedug princes the right to graze their livestock on the lands held by the Black Sea Cossacks on the right bank of the Kuban River. Batcheriy Hajemuqo returned to his territory in December 1795 with the directive for Russian support. Upon returning to his homeland, Batcheriy was greeted with great enthusiasm by his people.

Following the Empress's directive, Governor S.S. Zhegulin ordered Ataman Chepiha in January 1796 to prepare military reinforcements. Consequently, a detachment of approximately 300 Cossack jaegers and two field cannons from the Phanagoria fortress were dispatched under the command of Captain Yeremeyev to support the Bzhedug princes.

According to Circassian oral sources, Russian generals were delighted when Batcheriy requested assistance. They reportedly said, "Our greatest desire is for the two Circassian tribes to fight; their strength will be weakened, making it easier for us to conquer them." Researchers suggest the account's primary significance is the Circassian perspective of the conflict rather than its historical accuracy. The Russian Empire relied on local aristocratic elites as a primary instrument for establishing control over the Caucasus. The imperial administration operated on the premise that the indigenous nobility would facilitate the dissemination of loyalty to the empire and the established order.

=== Ottoman involvement ===
The 1791 capture of Anapa by Russian General Ivan Gudovich and the defeat of Ottoman forces provided conditions for the Shapsug peasant revolt. The weakening of the Ottoman military presence, which served as external support for the aristocratic class, allowed the peasant militia greater freedom of movement. Following the Treaty of Jassy in 1791, the region was formally left under Ottoman control. Ottoman officials in Anapa used this status to diplomatically protest the intervention of Russian Cossacks in local internal conflicts.

Ottoman official Seid Ahmet Pasha in Anapa played a role in escalating internal tensions, using the situation to strengthen Ottoman authority. Ottoman emissaries used the spread of Sharia law as a political tool to challenge the traditional influence of the Circassian nobility. By framing Islamic law as a system of social equality, they encouraged the commoner class to resist noble privileges, arguing that all Muslims were free and should not be subject to taxes beyond zakat. Seid Ahmet Pasha supported the commoners in their grievances against the nobility with the intent of subordinating the Circassians directly to the Ottoman Sultan. He encouraged the class conflict by characterizing the Shapsug nobility as an idle class that lived off the labor of the peasantry.

=== Neutrality of other Circassian principalities ===
==== Chemguy and Besleney stance ====
Among the other major principalities of Western Circassia were the Chemguy under Prince Aslanbech Boletuqo and the Besleney under Prince Qizbech Qanoqo, who were allies with each other. The two principalities remained neutral. As pro-Ottoman rulers who were resisting against Russia, they did not ally with the Bzhedugs who were receiving Russian military support. They also avoided open conflict with the Shapsugs to prevent a wider internal war.

==== Hatuqay stance ====
Another regional powerhouse was the Principality of Hatuqay. Before the battle, both the Shapsug and the Bzhedug sought military support from the Principality of Hatuqay. Prince Batcheriy of the Bzhedugs invited the ruler of the Hatuqay, Prince Jandjeriy, to join the expedition against the Shapsug; Jandjeriy declined and stated that the Hatuqay had no grievances with the Shapsug. When Shapsug delegates later requested the Hatuqays' help against the Bzhedug, he refused them also, saying the Hatuqay have no grievances with the Bzhedug.

== Battle preparations ==
Both sides prepared for the war for 3 years by supplying horses and weapons.

=== Nobility mobilization ===
In the first half of 1796, the Bzhedug nobility and their Shapsug noble allies finalized preparations for a military campaign against the commoner administration in Shapsug. This mobilization followed the return of Prince Batcheriy Hajemuqo from Saint Petersburg in December 1795, where he secured a directive for military intervention from Empress Catherine II.

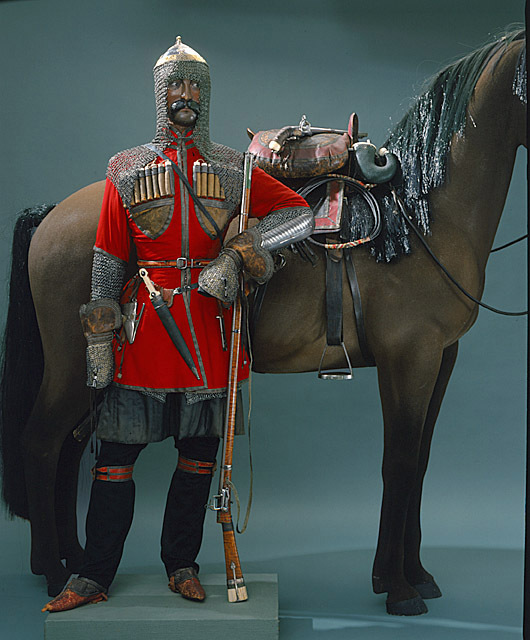
Circassian chain mail armor

On January 15 [O.S. January 4], 1796, an assembly of the Bzhedug nobility was held near the Bogoyavlensk crossing to coordinate command and select Prince Batcheriy as the leader of the coalition. The assembled force numbered between 3,000 and 5,000 men, including the Bzhedug commoner infantry. The cavalry unit was composed of the Bzhedug aristocracy and exiled Shapsug noble families. The Cossack detachment under Captain Timofey Yeremeyev joined the mobilization, providing approximately 100 (or 300) soldiers and two (or one) artillery cannons. Black Sea Cossack units were also incorporated into the army after Ataman Zakhary Chepiha received. Unlike the commoner army, the aristocratic army was more specialized in open-field combat. The bodies of the princes and nobles were protected by chain mail armor made of steel links, their heads by helmets, and their hands by arm guards. They were also armed with large sample rifles and blunderbusses.

=== Commoner mobilization ===
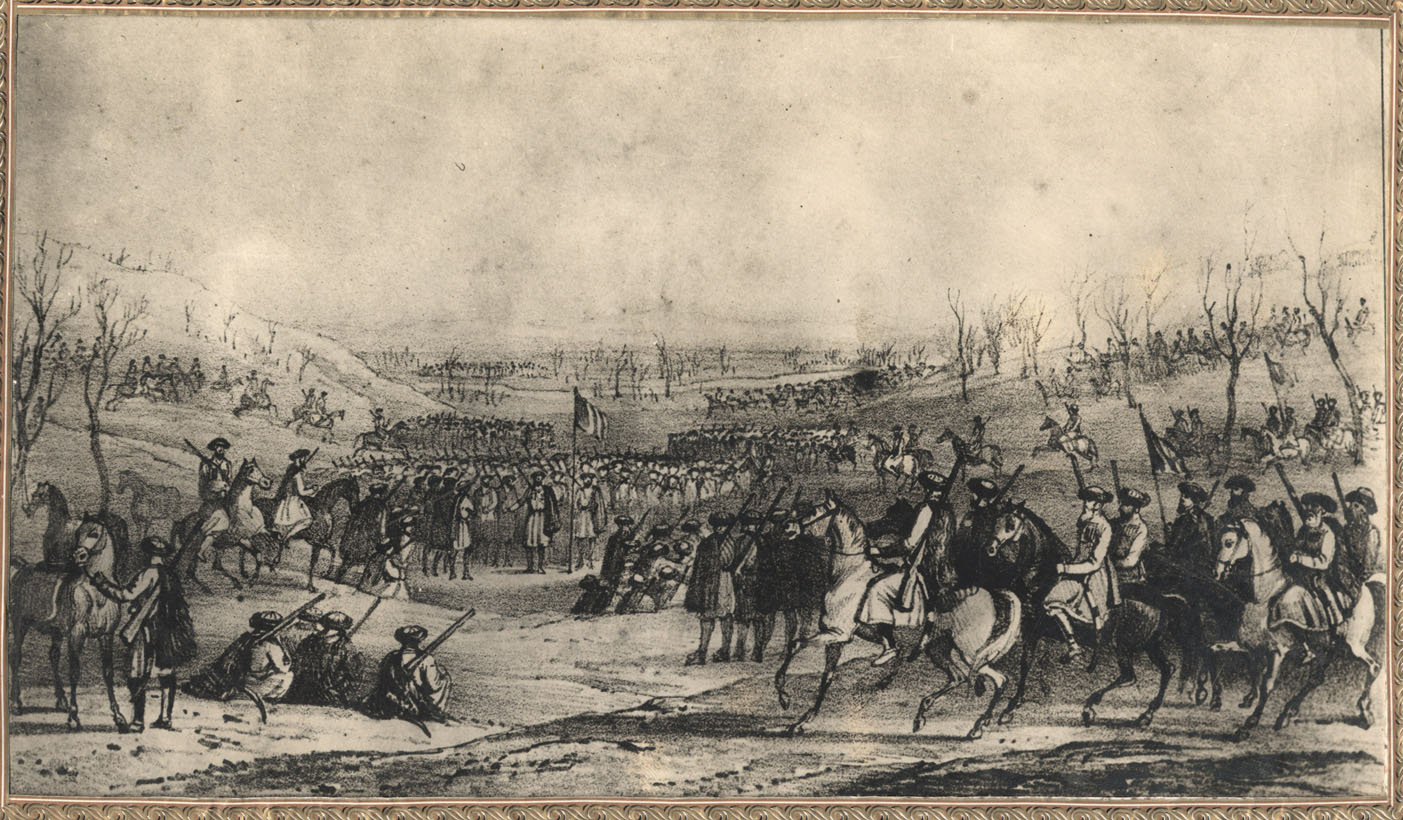
Gathering of Circassians, drawn by John Longworth

In 1796, upon receiving reports that the nobility had secured Russian military intervention, the peasant assembly of Shapsug declared a general mobilization. The commoners strengthened their alliances, and incorporated with the Abzakh and Natukhaj region. The assembled militia numbered between 10,000 and 12,000 men. The recruitment process involved a communal call for at least one representative from each household. Men under the age of thirty were generally excluded from active combat roles.

Shapsug commoner leader Mos Haghur was elected as the commander of the militia by the commoner administration. The militia army was organized into two tactical divisions. Nobleman Ahmed 'Qalebat' Shupako (Ahmed the Fortress-Wrecker) from the House of Shupako in the Natukhaj region assumed command of the cavalry, while the Shapsug commander and commoner Nepasho Naghoy Thakhuakho led the infantry. The cavalry was equipped with shashka (sabre), qama (dagger), rifle, bow and spear. The infantry was less equipped; hundreds of Shapsugs joined the militia less armed, but carrying long ropes to bind the aristocrats they expected to loot from Bzhedug villages after the battle.

=== Location ===
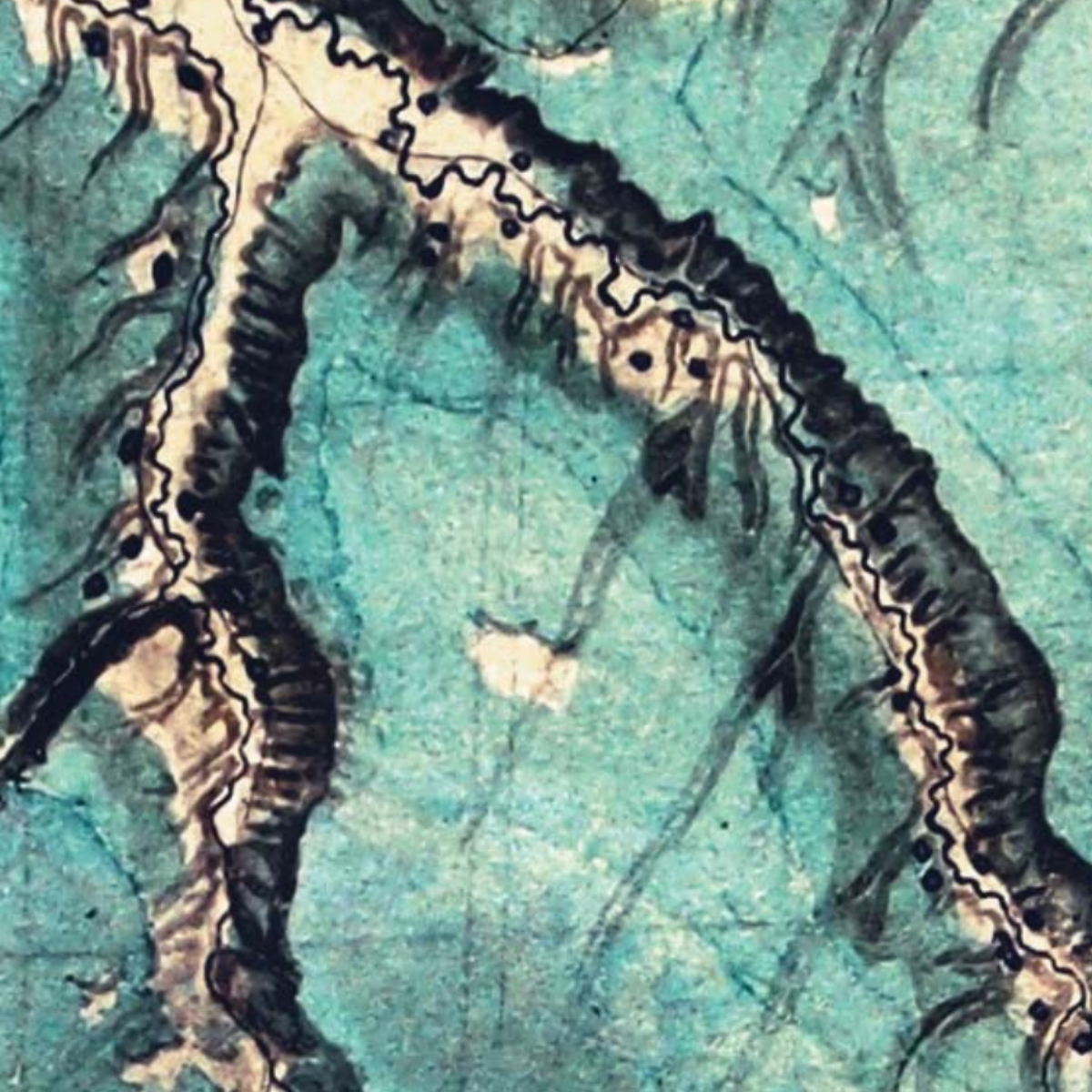
Fragment of the battle site from an 1864 Russian military map.

The timing and location of the Battle of Bziyiqo were established through formal diplomatic communication. Prince Batcheriy Hajemuqo, leader of the aristocratic coalition, dispatched an envoy to the Shapsug territory to deliver the challenge. According to the tradition, the return of an envoy unharmed would indicate that the opposing side was not ready for combat. However, the Shapsug commoners killed the messenger.

The site selected for the battle was the Najida Pasture, located within the Bziyiqo River valley. This area sits northeast of the modern settlement of Novodmitrievskaya. The pasture consists of a flat plain covering approximately three square kilometers. It is bounded to the right by the Bziyiqo River and to the left by the Shepsh River.

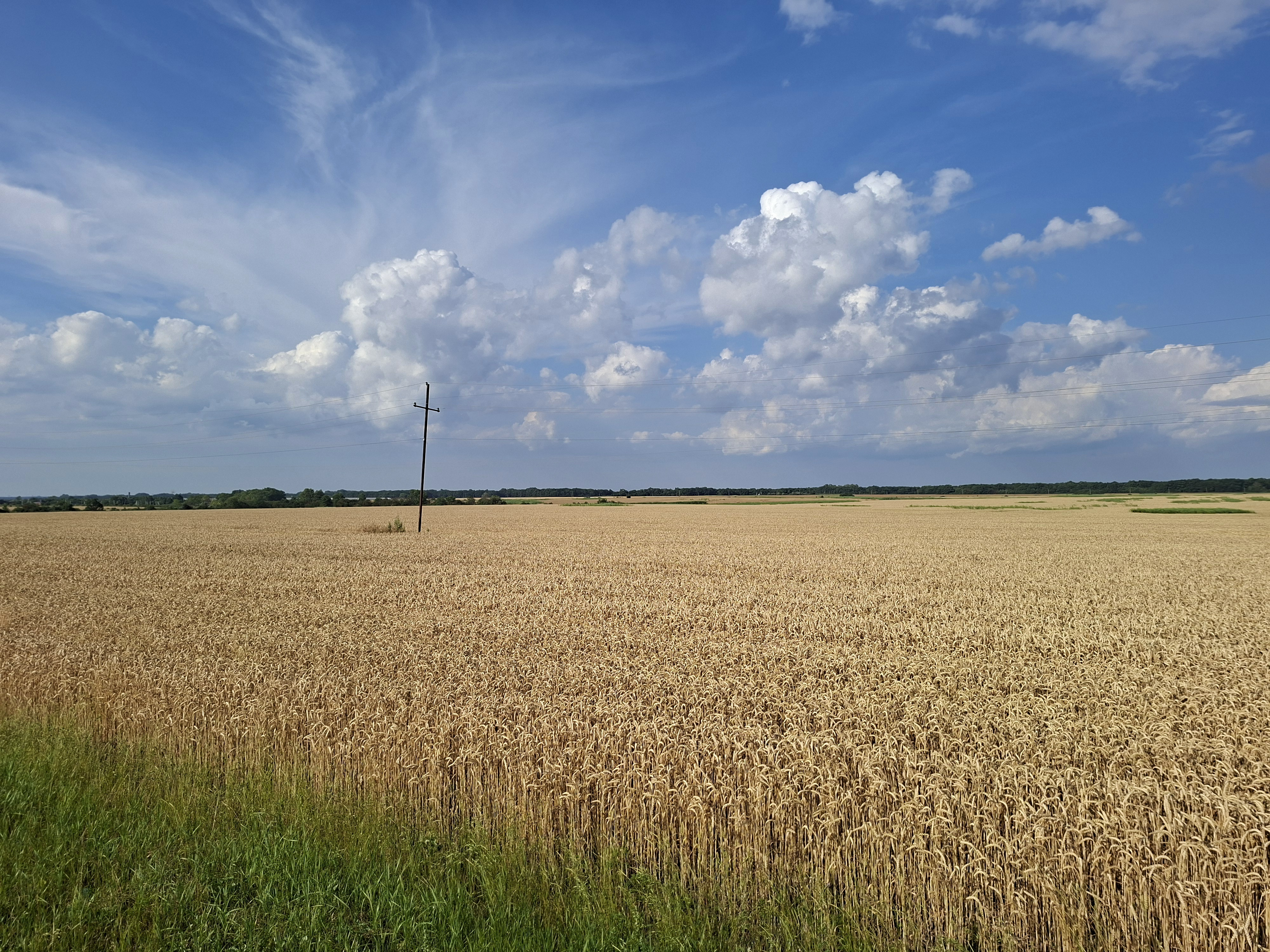
Battlefield of Bziyiqo near modern-day Novodmitrievskaya.

The name Bziyiqo (Adyghe: Бзыикъо) refers to the valley where the battle occurred. In the Adyghe language, the suffix -qo (-къо) has multiple distinct meanings: "valley", "son", and "pig". In this context, the term specifically means valley. The meaning of the prefix is not definitively established. Some interpretations suggest a link to the Ubykh word bzy ("water"), though linguists often reject this due to the geographical distance of Ubykhia. Another possibility is a connection to bziy (бзий), meaning "stem".

=== Battle formation ===
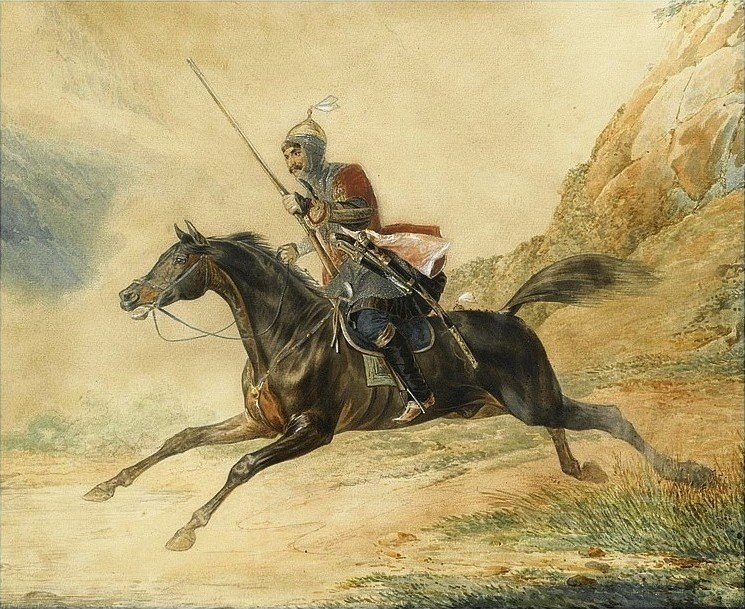
Charging Circassian nobleman

The aristocratic coalition, under the command of Batcheriy Hajemuqo, arrived at the location from the Tuabgho (modern-day Khomuty) region and earlier than the peasants and Prince Batcheriy Hajemuqo positioned the Cossack detachment and its two artillery cannons within the Lanchatkh (Лэнчъэтх) forest. This spesific location was preserved in Circassian oral tradition as "the Russian lying-down place" (Adyghe: урыс гъолъыпIэ). The aristocratic cavalry consisted of the commanders such as Mizaghi Hadjiqul, Wudjukh, Khasaqo Biyushkh and Qutas Hatita, took the southwest of the pasture. This position is currently located along Ordzhonikidze Street. The infantry force of the coalition was hidden within the Bziyiqo riverbed to wait for the peasant attack. The infantry was positioned two kilometer away from the cavalry. This arrangement was intended to draw the peasant militia toward the concealed artillery and infantry lines.

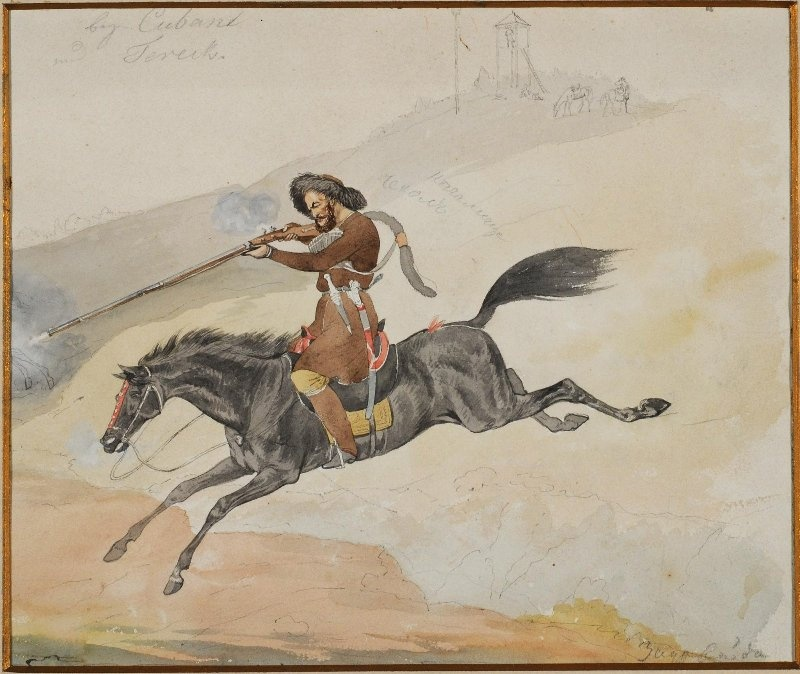
Galloping Circassian peasant

On July 6 [O.S. June 25], 1796, the peasant militia primarily composed of the Shapsug, along with Natukhaj, and Abzakh (including some commoner societies from the other tribes, as well as the Ubykh) regions consisting of approximately 12,000 men, began their movement toward the designated engagement site at the Najida (Нэджыдэ) Pasture within the Bziyiqo River valley. Although the militia possessed numerical superiority, it lacked the artillery and disciplined cavalry available which the coalition had.

The commoner army consisted mostly of infantry, while nearly half of the Bzhedug force was composed of cavalry.

== Battle of Bziyiqo ==
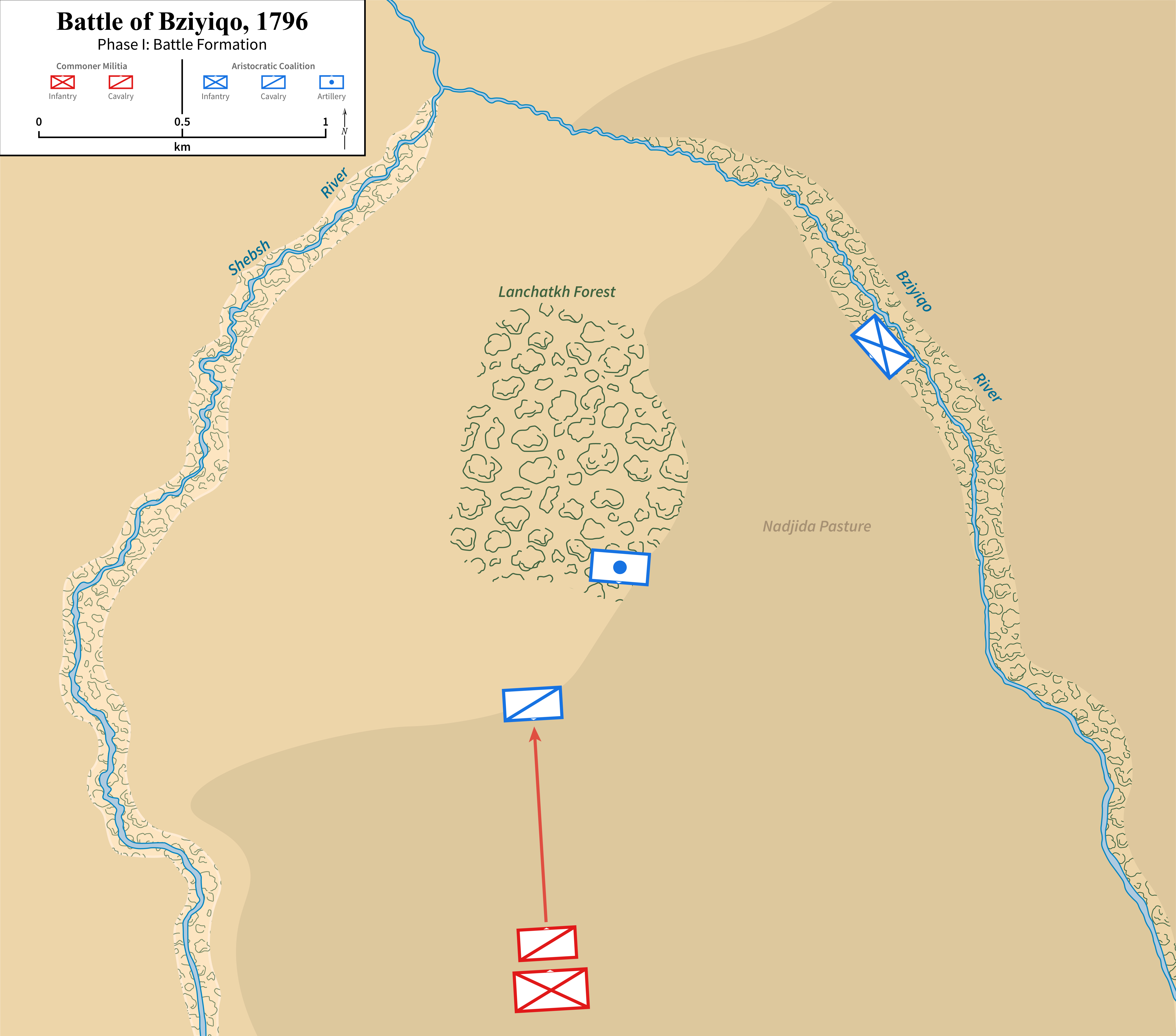
Phase I Battle Formation

The battle began on the morning of July 10 [O.S. June 29], 1796. Weather conditions changed from clear skies to a storm with heavy rain, intense winds, and frequent lightning strikes. This turned the valley floor into a thick mire of mud, which severely hindered movement and saturated the gunpowder of the peasant militia, rendering their flintlock firearms mostly ineffective. The aristocratic coalition maintained operational weapons because Captain Timofey Yeremeyev provided dry powder supplies to their units. The militia cavalry led by Ahmed Shupako, relying on sabers, gathered along a wide line to adopt an offensive formation and launched a direct charge from the south against the aristocratic cavalry to open the battle.

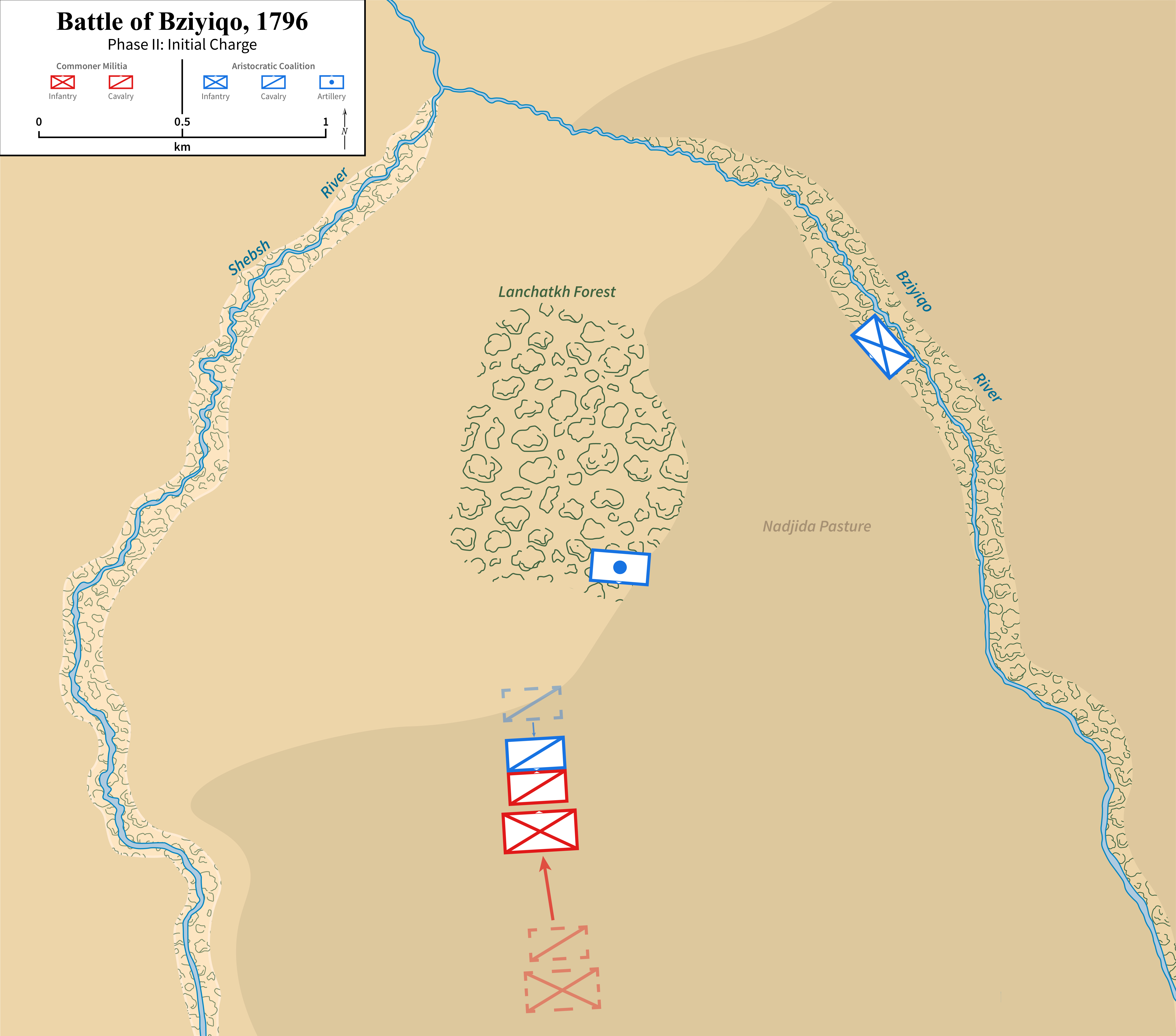
Phase II Initial Charge

By the command of Batcheriy, artillery fire from the Cossack unit caused a disorder among the militia. The militia responded by firing arrows and a volley before continuing to charge the aristocratic cavalry with sabers.

The peasant militia launched an extensive assault, with their standard-bearers advancing deep into the aristocratic cavalry lines. During the subsequent close-quarters combat, the militia lines raised a victory cry upon believing Prince Batcheriy Hajemuqo had been killed. This caused a loss of morale and confusion among the aristocratic ranks. Bzhedug commanders managed to reorganize their units and set their tactical plan into motion. Contemporary belief was that the death of Batcheriy would result in the defeat of the nobility. Batcheriy had actually sustained a fatal head wound and was moved behind the Bzhedug line, near the Cossack unit in the Lanchatkh forest, where he would die at the conclusion of the battle.

The aristocratic cavalry performed a feigned retreat to draw the militia into the designated ambush area by exploiting their newfound confidence and perceived advantage. Believing they were winning, the peasant cavalry pursued the retreating aristocratic units toward the Bziyiqo riverbed. Upon reaching the site, the aristocratic cavalry moved to the left and exposed the Bzhedug peasant infantry hidden within the riverbed. The Bzhedug infantry suddenly opened fire on the militia cavalry. Simultaneously, the artillery under Captain Yeremeyev fired from positions in the forest into the militia lines at close range.

The aristocratic cavalry and infantry then attacked the militia cavalry. Trapped between the two forces, the militia cavalry attempted to retreat but collided with their own approaching infantry from the back. This collision resulted in disorganized forces and prevented the peasant cavalry from establishing a defense. The cavalry commanders of the militia unsuccessfully tried to restore order and those who refused to flee were killed on the field. The aristocratic infantry then attacked the militia infantry. The militia infantry continued to fight the Bzhedug infantry despite high casualties. The aristocratic cavalry launched a counterattack against the militia cavalry and caused it to scatter.

After scattering and driving the militia cavalry from the field, the aristocratic cavalry returned to the main battlefield to attack the militia infantry from the back, who were fighting against the Bzhedug infantry. The militia infantry led by Nepasho Thakhuakho, was caught between the two forces. The rain and mud turned the battle into a long and exhaustive attrition.

The entire battle lasted seven hours until the remanining militia forces were either removed from the valley or taken prisoner.

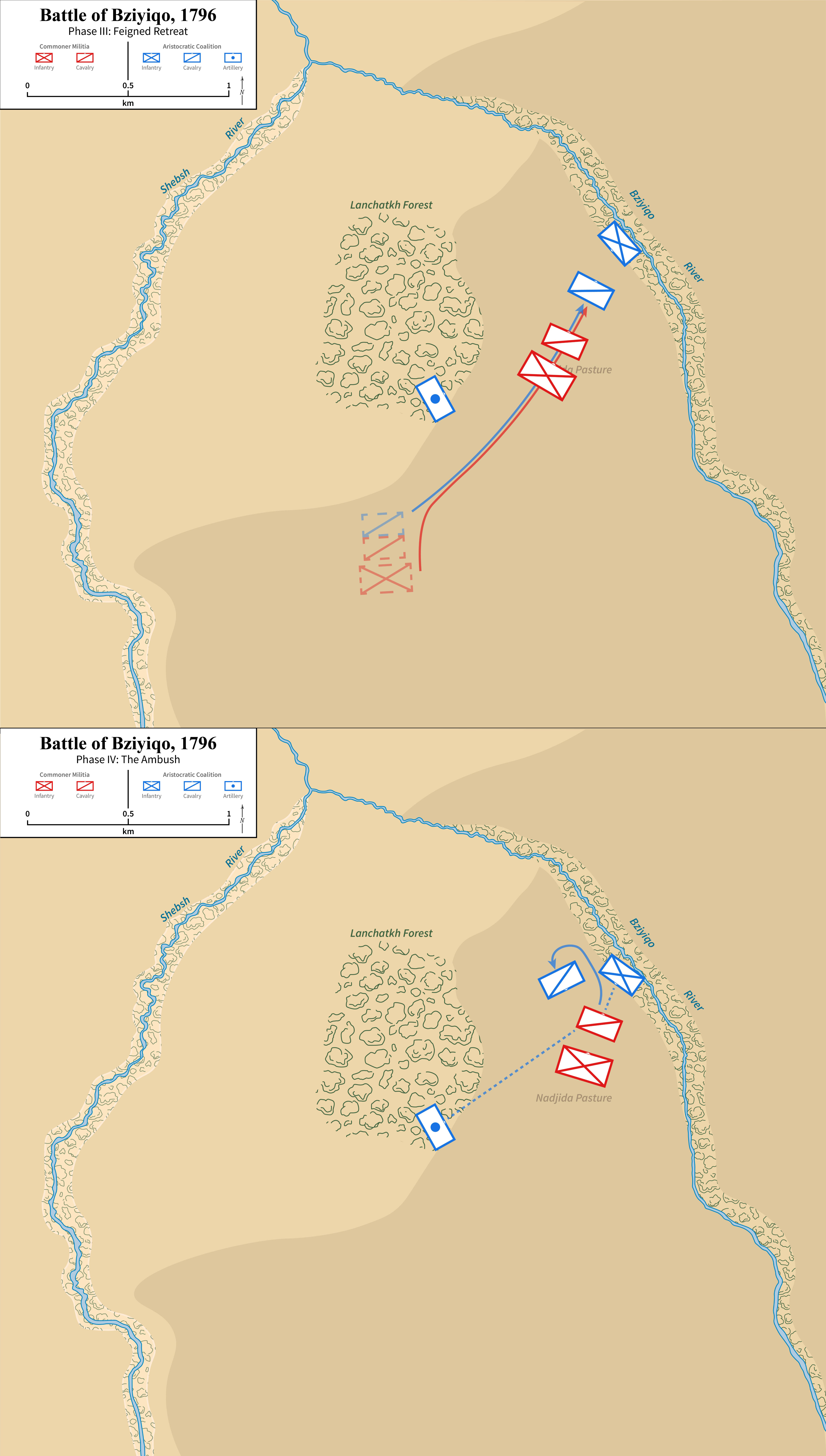
Phase III (Feigned Retreat) and Phase IV (The Ambush).

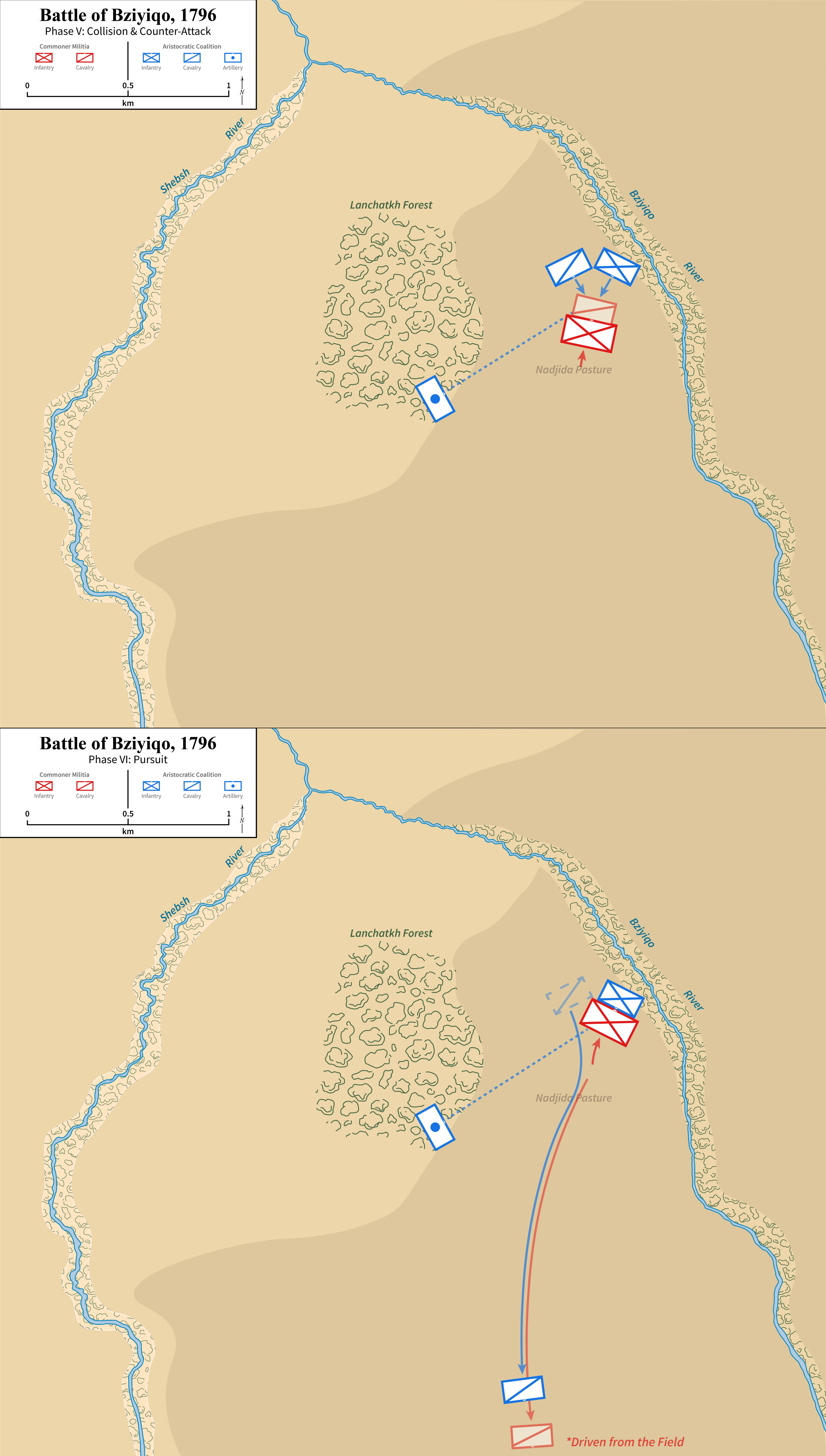
Phase V (Collision & Counter-Attack) and Phase VI (Pursuit)

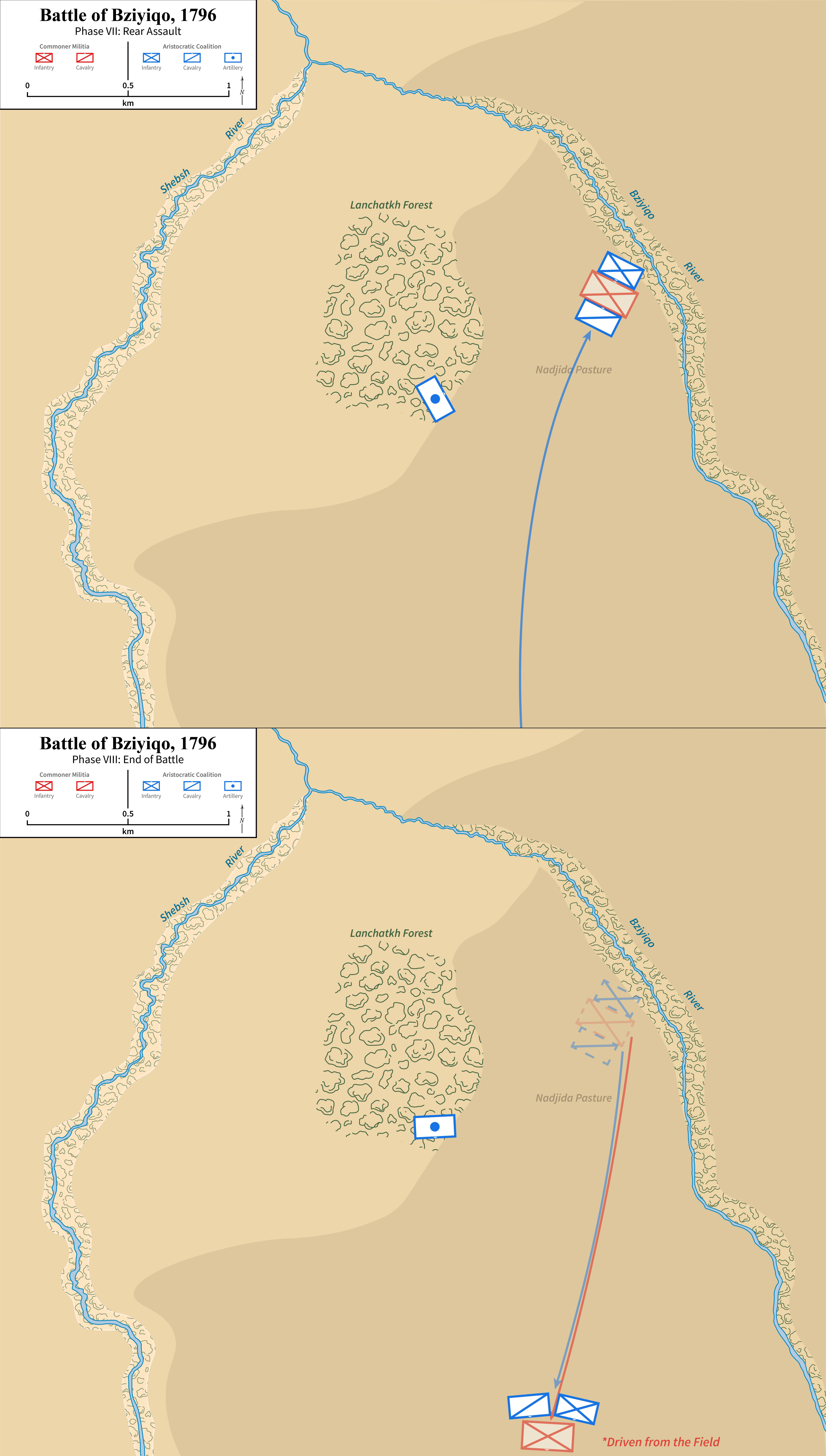
Phase VII (Rear Assault) and Phase VIII (End of Battle)

=== Casualties ===
The battle resulted in fatalities for both sides. The peasant militia sustained 2,000 wounded, while death toll estimates vary between 2,000 and 4,000 depending on the source. The commander of the militia, Mos Haghur and his eight brothers were killed in combat. The person who killed Mos Haghur has been attributed to these people: Yesenjel Yeshigowo, Zecheriy Kheuseqo. The Natukhaj cavalry commander Ahmed Shupako (the Fortress-Wrecker) had also been killed in the battle. The militia also lost at least 300 men captured and 800 horses. Those who were captured were bound with the very ropes they had brought to secure their own prisoners; they were then led back in captivity to the villages they had originally intended to plunder after the battle. Large amount of weapons left behind by the militia was collected at the battlefield.

The aristocratic coalition's exact losses are unknown, however many elite Bzhedug warriors were killed. However Autlev estimates that around 2,000 were killed including the Bzhedug commoners. The leader of the aristocratic coalition, Prince Batcheriy Hajemuqo, was killed after a deadly wound he took within the first phase of the battle. According to both witnesses and oral sources, Batcheriy died shortly after receiving news of the Bzhedug victory, however there are other versions of how he died in folklore. The person who killed Batcheriy has been attributed to these people in oral tradition: Mos Haghur, Lukh Thakhuakho, Sharikh the Beekeeper, Shkhalakho Halash, Nepasho Naghoy Thakhuakho, Bghane, Shkhalakho Sheupsijuq.

The Cossack unit was not involved in the fighting except for artillery fire. The unit sustained nine casualties, including Praporshchik Blokha.

== Aftermath of the battle ==
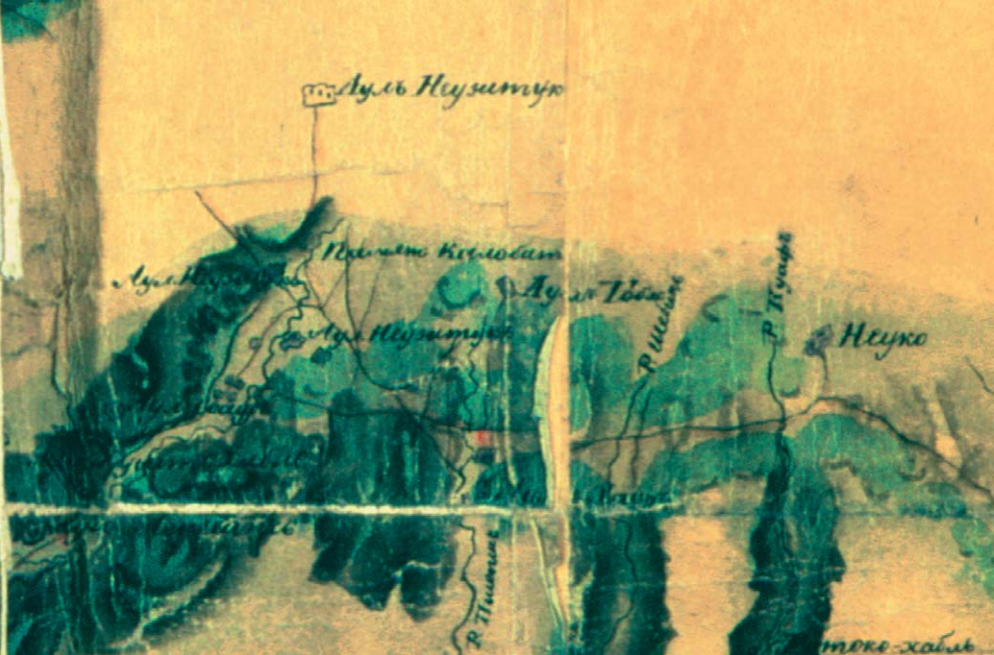
Burial mound of Ahmet 'Qalebat'

The aristocratic forces remained on the battlefield, yet the casualties of the coalition forces led to the outcome being described as a Pyrrhic victory. Death of Prince Batcheriy was a significant lost and left the Bzhedug aristocracy without a leader. Shapsugs claimed that while their own population losses could be recovered, the Bzhedug could not replace a leader like Batcheriy Hajemuqo.

According to an oral source, the Bzhedugs began killing the wounded commoner militias who remained on the battlefield after the battle ended. Despite the Bzhedug princes permitting the relatives of the fallen commoners to retrieve the bodies from the battlefield, most could not be collected and buried due to the sheer number of the deceased, leaving them to decay on the field. There were two burial mounds in the Adagum Valley; the smaller one belonged to Ahmed 'the Fortress-Wrecker' Shupako, commander of the militia cavalry forces, and his comrades, while the larger one belonged to 800 commoners who were killed in the battle.

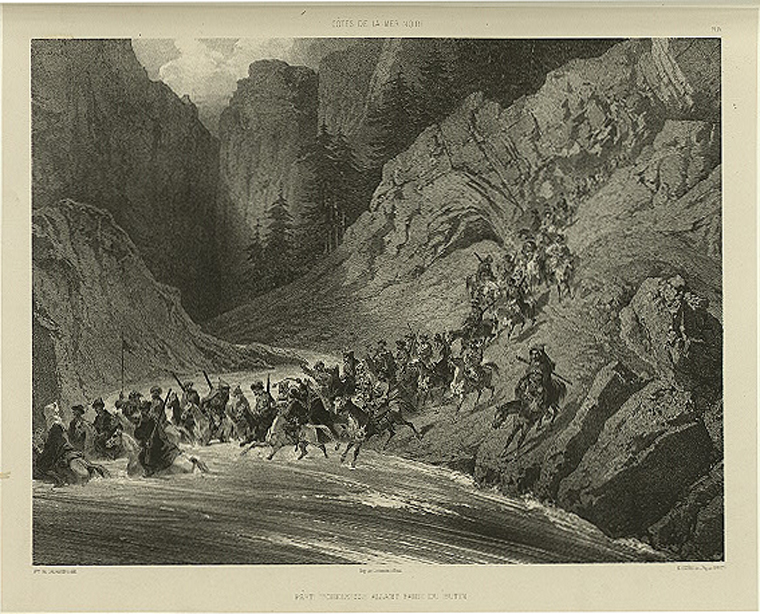
A raid campaign, Grigory Gagarin

The heavy military defeat did not lead to the surrender of the Shapsugs. Instead, it increased the hostilities toward the victors, resulting in several large-scale military expeditions on Bzhedug territories for several years. The battle concluded with the peasant unions maintaining independent administrative structures. This outcome also resulted from the lack of a well-centralized leadership after the death of Batcheriy among the nobility, high casualties and continued support for Shapsug peasants from Abzakhs and Natukhajs. After 1797, the Russian government stopped providing military assistance to the aristocracy. This policy change followed internal Black Sea Cossack uprisings between 1797 and 1799. Despite the expectations of the Russian Empire, the nobility could not regain their former rights, and as a result, many aristocrats sought refuge under Russian protection. In 1798/99, Alisultan Sheretluqo moved to the village of Grivenskaya within the Black Sea region in Russia after concluding that the nobility could not return to their lands. Individual nobles who returned to Shapsug territory did so only with the formal permission of the commoner assemblies.

The Shapsug leaders vowed to continue fighting until they reached the center of the Bzhedug lands, which they eventually reached. After several years of continuous war, both sides became physically and mentally exhausted from fighting. During the final Shapsug expedition, no actual fighting occurred. The leaders of both sides stopped their warriors from fighting, acknowledging that too many lives had already been lost.

The conflict eventually moved toward a diplomatic solution through secret negotiations between the Shapsug administration and the sons of the exiled nobles. These descendants returned to Shapsugia individually under specific agreed-upon terms. Bzhedugs viewed this return as an act of ingratitude. The socio-political changes following the war were codified during the Psichetiqo Assembly (Adyghe: Псычетыкъо зэфэс) in 1803. This agreement protected private property and established new scales for blood money that reduced the legal disparity between the nobility and commoners. The traditional judicial authority of noble families was replaced by peasant courts and assemblies managed by elected elders and members of the oath unions. By 1822, the status difference between the nobility and the common people had largely disappeared, and punishments and rights had been equalized. These developments established an administrative model in Shapsug and Natukhaj territories that continued until the end of the Russo-Circassian War.

== In folklore ==
There are approximately 30 archived oral manuscripts including songs regarding the battle.

The people express their view of Batcheriy through the words of a Shapsug woman who lost two sons and her husband in the war: "Shapsug women can make up for the losses of the Shapsugs in a single night, but the Bzhedugs will not have a prince like Batcheriy for another hundred years." Even years after the war, the elders or their sons in the region calculated their ages according to this war ("I could ride a horse during the time of the Battle of Bziyiqo") and remembered the war as divine punishment.

=== Songs ===
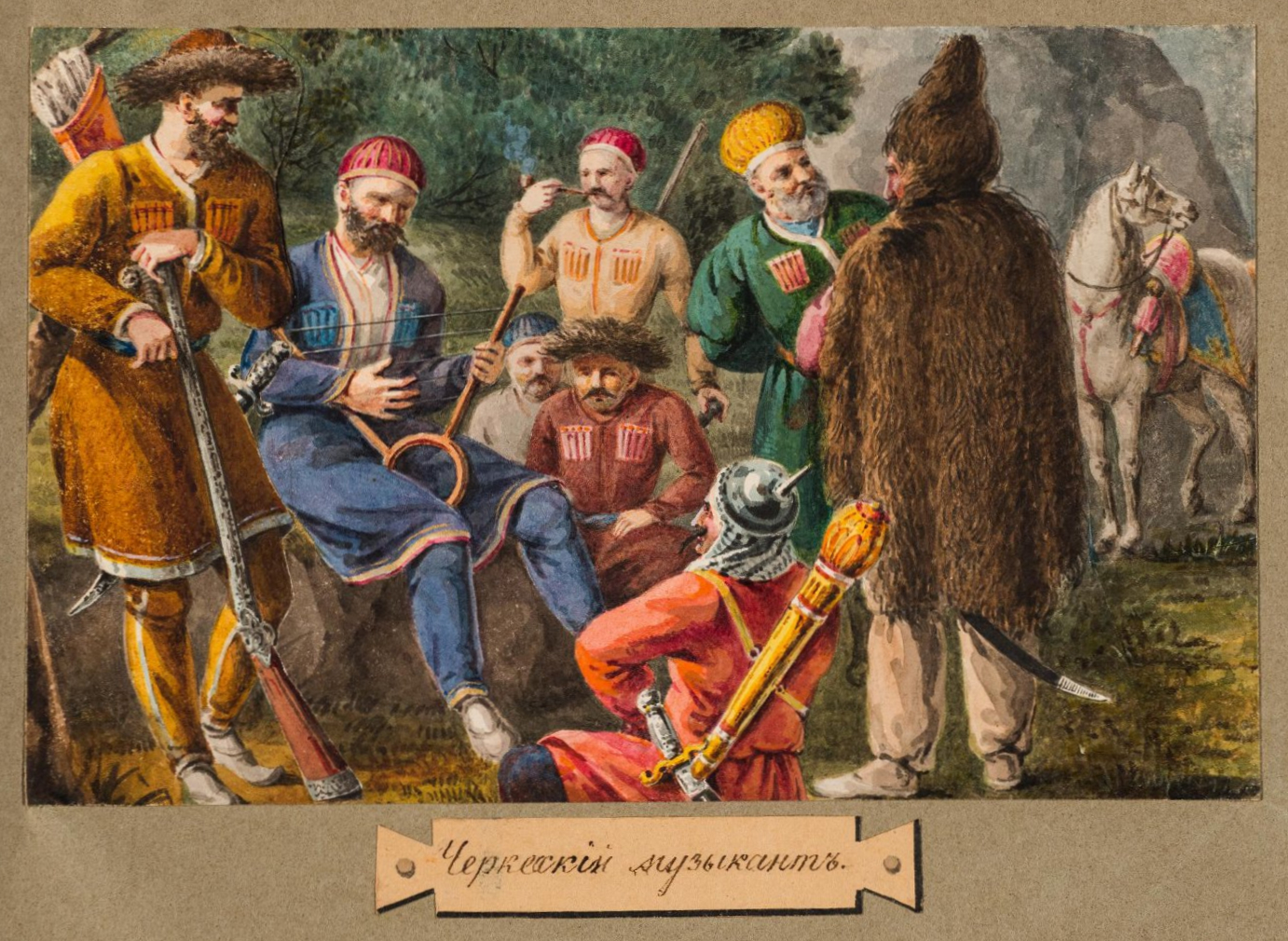
Circassian musician, 1820s

There are two recorded different songs regarding the battle. One is from the Bzhedug and the other is from the Shapsug.

==== Bzhedug song ====
The Bzhedug song follows the traditional tlibe wored (Adyghe: лIыбэ орэд, lit. 'song of many men') structure, a multi-hero song format that names numerous participants. The narrative consists of three-line laudatory passages. The ARIGI archives contain 28 manuscript texts of this version. Analysis of 33 different manuscripts of the song and narrations reveals that while 44 individual heroes are mentioned across all variants, seven names (Batcheriy Hajemuqo, Alqas Hajemuqo, Alqas Lakhshuqo, Yesenjel Yeshiguawo, Kheuseqo Zecheriy, Pshimaf Bateqo, and Yedij Berzej) appear consistently. The lyrics were first published in 1887 and 1891 (by Potto and Lopatinsky), and later in 1924 and 1986. The 1986 scholarly edition is based on the only audio recording made by Ali Udichak in 1976.

When the song was performed in the houses of the nobility, the names of the heroes from the common people were sometimes deliberately replaced by the names of noble families by the singers.

Unlike other heroic songs, the Bzhedug "Bziyiqo War Song" was not popular. Many performers refused to sing it, stating that it was "an ominous song." This reflects the public's sorrowful view of this civil war and the shedding of fraternal blood.

Some notable verses regarding the intensity of the battle:

Фарэр щэкӏэ къябгъэди,
Нэджыдэ хьэдэкӏэ къябгъэджи,
Хьэджэмыкъо Батчэрый.

Translation:

He allowed [his own] Fara (a horse breed) to be pierced by bullets,
He covered the Nadjida field with corpses,
Batcheri Hajemuqo (in variants — Pshiquy Bateqo)

Гъочэгыер блэнашъхь,
Шапсыгъашъхьэм рэджэгу,
Хьэджэмыкъо Алкъэс, (Дыхъу Мырзэбэч).

Translation:

His roan horse has the head of a doe [deer],
He plays with the heads of the Shapsugs,
Alqas Hajemuqo, (in variants — Dukhu Mirzabech).

Къодэмыхьэр къегъалӏэ,
Шапсыгъэ лъэсхэр зэрефэ,
Бэрзэдж Едыдж.

Translation:

He exhausts Kodamih [his horse],
He drives away the Shapsug infantry,
Yedij Berzej.

The song also includes lines referring to the threat posed by the Shapsugs to Bzhedug territory:

...
Мы зы налъэм тырафмэ,
Дэхэ нэпэшӏухэр ахъын.

Translation:

...
If they drive us out of this strip [of land],
They will take away the beautiful, fair-faced ones.

The following verses are from the literary Russian translation first published by Vasily Potto in 1887, then in 1891 by Lev Lopatinsky along the original text:

Lyrics of the Bzhedug Song

His horse Khuara had a beautiful neck, and upon him he bravely entered the battle against the enemies. Fight, Batcheriy!

Not much time passed, and the horse Khuara was already all studded with arrows sticking out of his sides. Fight, Batcheriy!

His helmet was shiny like the sun, and he himself shone among everyone like the sun. Fight, Batcheriy.

But then the silk whip fell from his hands, and he set away from us like a young moon. Fight, Bzhedug lads!

The Bzhedugs began to weep, having lost their beloved leader Batcheriy Hajemuqo in battle. Even the great empress mourned his death. Fight, Bzhedug lads!

Happy Batcheriy, your happy bride Goshemaf sobbed for you. Fight, Bzhedug lads!

"We shall avenge the enemies!" – a cry rang out in the air, and the Nadjida field was covered with enemy bodies. Fight, Bzhedug lads!

An unfastened collar revealed his chainmail; he was invincible in battle, Pshimaf Bateqo.

In the night time he guarded the camp, as a fortress guards people by day, Anchoq Akhedjaguqo.

He pushed his helmet forward and, lowering the visor, cut into the middle of the enemies, Islam Hajemuqo.

He was wounded in the hip, but, leaning on the neck of the horse, continued to strike the enemies, Bechmiz Akhedjaguqo.

He had a face the color of iron, and he himself was an iron man; the whistle of bullets delighted him, Yedij Berzej.

He had a wide-muzzled musket and with one shot killed two enemies, Asqal Lakhshiqo.

He pulled the bowstring the full length of the arrow, and his arrow was deadlier than a bullet, Qazi Deguj.

His horse was roan with a head like a deer, and he himself played with the heads of the Shapsugs, Alqas Hajemuqo.

His horse Bechmiz played under him, and he did not count the blows of his sword, Yaqubequ Hajemuqo.

Under him was the hot horse Kodamih, with it he trampled the Shapsug infantry, Yedij Berzej.

He fell gloriously in battle, and the doors of his sakli closed upon little children, Yesenjel Yeshigowo.

He fired the first shot and killed the main Shapsug leader, Zecheriy Kheuseqo.

In 1976, Zaramuk Kardangushev recorded the song in Neshukay by vocalist Ali Udichak, chorus by Yeredzhib Chich, Titu Chesebiyev, and Aslanbech Chich on the shichepshin. N. R. Ivanokov transcribed the text. Lyrics of the version of the recording:

Lyrics of the Recorded Variant

Хъуарэ гущэр щэджэ къябгъэды,
Мэджыдэр хьадэджэ къябгъэуцу,
Батэкъо Пщыкъуй.

Чэрэчэоу щыгъы гущэхэри пшъэп Іэхъуба,
Зыщымыхъужьырэм тикъал,
Бэрзэджыджэ Едыдж.

Ишхонч кІэкІитІори егъао гущэба,
Хьагъуры зэшитІори еукІы,
Ешыгоо Есэнджэл.

ИсабыитІухэри лъэрычъэ гущэба.
Ар ихьакІэщыпчъэри фашІыжьы,
Хэусэкъо ЗекІорыешку!

Къодэмыхьэ гущэхэри егъалъэ гущэба,
Хьэдэмэ ялъэээ мэзао,
Джэджэкъоджэ шъуи Мырзэбэч!

Ыкопкъышъхьэ гущэми щэ хэлъы гущэри,
Шы сэкум хэлъызэ мэзауи,
Асэкъалэкъоджэ Пщымаф.

Translation:

He allowed [his own] Khuara (a horse breed) to be pierced by bullets,
He covered the Nadjida field with corpses,
Pshiquy Bateqo

He wears a wide-collared coat on him,
Our fortress when times are difficult for us, —
Yedij Berzej.

From his two pistols he is firing, alas,
He kills two of the Haghur brothers, —
Yesenjel Yeshigowo.

His two little children had only just started to run,
[But] the door to your guest-house is closed forever, —
Zecheriy Kheuseqo!

He makes Kodamih (his horse) jump, alas,
Fighting while jumping over the bodies, —
Your Mirzabech of the Jejeqo.

In his hip, alas, a bullet is lodged, alas,
Fighting while lying upon the mane of the horse, —
Pshimaf Asaqaluqo.

==== Shapsug song ====
The Shapsug song is structured as a ghibze (Adyghe: гъыбзэ, lit. 'language of crying'), meaning lament. This version consists of a ten-line text that focuses on the tragedy of the defeat and the scale of the losses sustained by the Shapsug forces. Full lyrics of the Shapsug song:

Хьаплъэкъо ихьэдэ пIэуплъэ гуих,
Чэтэжъыр зырахкIэ — Тхьаркъохъо Нэгъой НэпашIу.
Бжъэдыгъумэ яшIуным екIэпцIэ пIынэр шъхьарыгъ,
Хьагурымэ яцукъофитIур щэжыным егъалIэ.
Заор зызэхахьэкIэ Бэрзэджым икъодэмыхъэр кIэралI,
ЛIэу хэкум исыр зы мэфэ заом хэкIуадэ.
Хьагур зэшибгъур зы мэфэ заом хэкIуад.
Хьагурымэ янысэжъибгъумэ шъыгъошъэ джанэр ащыгъ.
Мы лажьэр тщызыгъэгъупшэщэрым къэзыгъэшIыгъэр фэраз,
Шапсыгъэмэ япшъэшъэ дахэхэр зыщэжъынылIи щымыI.

Translation:

The sight of Hapleqo's corpse is terrifying to behold,
When they draw the old sword — it is Naghoy Nepasho Tharqokho.
To those who reconcile with the Bzhedugs, put on an alder-bark cap,
The Haghur family's two light-colored oxen are exhausted from hauling the corpses.
When the war begins, Berzej's Kodamih (horse) dies [is tied to the spot],
The men living in the homeland perished in a single day of war.
The nine Haghur brothers perished in a single day of war.
The nine brides of the Haghur family have put on mourning dresses.
Whoever makes us forget this grief, the Creator will be grateful to him,
For the beautiful Shapsug girls, there is no one left to marry.

The alder-bark cap (екIэпцIэ пIын) was a traditional Circassian headgear used for public shaming. It was forced upon those accused of cowardice or treason. In the lament's context, this ritual targets those attempting to reconcile with the Bzhedugs.

In a variant of the Bzhedug song, there is a four-line section that deviates from the normal three-line structure and expresses sorrow over the catastrophe experienced by the Shapsugs. Researchers think this may have been borrowed from a variant of the Shapsug song.

Шапсыгъэшхо гущэри, уикӏожьыкӏает,
Языку гущэри хьадибгъут,
Якуибгъу гущэри хьадишъэт,
Шапсыгъэшхо гущэри, уикӏожьыкӏает.

Translation:

Great Shapsugia, alas, your return [from war] is a tragedy,
In one cart, alas, there are nine corpses,
In nine carts, alas, there are a hundred corpses,
Great Shapsugia, alas, your return is a tragedy.

=== Participants ===
Circassian oral history and songs preserve the names of some of the individuals who fought in the battle. These records are not a complete list of all combatants from the oral tradition.

Qizbech Tughuzhuqo was 18–19 years old at the time from the Sheretluqo noble clan. While he later became a prominent leader in the Russo-Circassian War, he was a minor figure during this battle due to the period. It is unclear as to which side Qizbech supported. Qizbech nearly lost his head during the battle but survived with a deep scar.

==== Bzhedug participants ====
List of Bzhedugs mentioned in the variants of the Bzhedug song of the Battle of Bziyiqo
Name (in English)	Name (Adyghe Original)
Batcheriy Hajemuqo (Khimishiy Prince)	Хьаджэмыкъо Батчэрый (Хъымыщэй пщы)
Alqas Hajemuqo (Khimishiy Prince)	Хьаджэмыкъо Алкъэс (Хъымыщэй пщы)
Islam Hajemuqo (Khimishiy Prince)	Хьаджэмыкъо Ислам (Хъымыщэй пщы)
Yaqubequ Hajemuqo (Khimishiy Prince)	Хьаджэмыкъо Якъубэкъу (Хъымыщэй пщы)
Naghoy Krimcheriyeqo (Khimishiy Prince)	Кърымчэрыекъо Нэгъой (Хъымыщэй пщы)
Bzedjeus Qunchiqoqo (Cherchenay Prince)	Къунчыкъокъо Бзэджэус (Чэрчэнай пщы)
Anchoq Akhedjaguqo (Cherchenay Prince)	Ахэджагокъо Анцокъу (Чэрчэнай пщы)
Bechmiz Akhedjaguqo (Cherchenay Prince)	Ахэджагокъо Бэчмыз (Чэрчэнай пщы)
Yaghubequ Akhedjaguqo (Cherchenay Prince)	Ахэджагокъо Ягъубэкъу (Чэрчэнай пщы)
Bechmiz Jejeqo (Cherchenay Prince)	Джэджыкъо Бэчмыз (Чэрчэнай пщы)
Mirzabech Jejeqo (Cherchenay Prince)	Джэджыкъо Мырзэбэч (Чэрчэнай пщы)
Yelmiz Jejeqo (Cherchenay Prince)	Джэджыкъо Елмыз (Чэрчэнай пщы)
Taumez Jejeqo (Cherchenay Prince)	Джэджыкъо Таумэз (Чэрчэнай пщы)
Pshimaf Asqele (or Asaqaluqo)	Аскъэлэ Пщымаф
Pshimaf Bateqo	Батэкъо Пщымаф
Pshiquy Bateqo	Батэкъо Пщыкъуй
Boreqo Bzhihaqo	Бжыхьакъо Борэкъу
Aldjeriy Bzhihaqo	Бжыхьакъо Алджэрый
Yedij Berzej	Бэрзэдж Едыдж
Hatit Berzej	Бэрзэдж Хьатит
Qarbatir Dobreqo	Добрэкъо Къэрбатыр
Qazi Deguj	Дэгужъ Къази
Mirzabech Dukhuqo	Дыхъукъо Мырзэбэч
Qarbatir Dibariqo	Дыбарыкъо Къэрбатыр
Aslan Yeshigowo	Ешыгоо Аслъан
Yesenjel Yeshiqo / Yesenjel Yeshigowo	Ещыкъо Есэнджэл / Ешыгоо Есэнджэл
Zecheriy Yeshiqo	Ещыкъо Зэчэрый
Asqal (Alqas) Lakhshiqo	Лахъщыкъо Аскъал (Алкъэс)
Muhamet Tleptseriqo / Tlepseriche	ЛъэпцIэрыкъо (ЛъэпцIэрычъэ) Мыхьамэт
Wuzishequ Tlikhese	ЛIыхэсэ Узыщэкъу
Hajequl Mizeghi	Мызэгъы Хьаджэкъул
Habiridj Woshogumiqo	Ошъогумыкъо Хьабырыдж
Hajebiram Pchihatliqo	ПкIыхьалIыкъо Хьаджэбирам
Metzet Sewoshkho	Сеошхо Мэтзэт
Shinakhu Techekhuniqo (peasant)	Тэчэхъуныкъо Шъынахъу (фэкъолI)
Wudjukh Tekhutem	Уджыхъу Тэхъутэм
Tekhutiniqo Tekhutem	Тэхъутыныкъо Тэхъутэм
Zecheriy Khepseqoqo / Zekoriyeshkhu Kheuseqo	Хепсэкъокъо Зэчэрый / Хэусэкъо ЗекIорыешху
Biyushkh Kheuseqo	Хэусэкъо Быишху
Zecheriy Hajeqo	Хьаджэкъо Зэчэрый
Qutas Hatita	Хьатитэ Къутас
Chetezhah Hadepesho	Хьадэпэшъо Чэтэжъахь
Taumiz Hashukhuaneqo	Хьашъухъуанэкъо Таумыз
Muhamet Khureshe	Хъурэшэ Мыхьамэт
Ghomilegheshu Chilsheqo	Чъылшэкъо Гъомылэгъэшъу
Teutchozh Shinekho	Шъынэхъо Теуцожь
Bghujizh Shkhapleqo	Шъхьаплъэкъо Бгъуджыжь
Hatugh Shebene	Шэбэнэ Хьатыгъу

==== Militia participants ====
List of militia mentioned in oral sources
Name (in English)	Name (Adyghe Original)
Mos Haghur	Хьагъур Мос
Ahmed 'the Fortress-Wrecker' (Qalebat) Shupako	ШIупакIо Ахьмэд «Къэлэубат»
Nepasho Naghoy Thakhuakho / Tharqokho	Тхьахъохъо Нэгъой НэпашIо (е Тхьаркъохъо)
Ajighuy Thakhuakho	Тхьахъохъо Ажъыгъуй
Lukh Thakhuakho	Тхьахъохъо Лыхъу
Halash Shkhalakho	Шъхьэлэхъо Хьалъащ
Shopsijuq Shkhalakho	Шъхьалэхъо Щэупсыжъыкъу
Ghubzh Hapleqo	Хьаплъэкъо Гъубдж
Neshu Techekho	Тэчэхъо Нэшъу
Sherikh the Beekeeper	бжьахъо Щэрыхъ
Bghane	Бгъанэ
Tukh	ТIыхъу
Shirukh	Щырыхъу

== Historiography ==
=== Pre-Revolutionary period (19th century – 1917) ===
Russian military officers, European travelers, and Circassian intellectuals focused on gathering factual data, generally viewing the battle as a result of class struggle within a feudalizing society. Researchers like G. Novitsky, L. Lulye, and N. Karlgof stated the democratic outcome and that the nobility lost their power and became equal to the common people. Scholars and local figures like Sultan Khan-Giray, N. Dubrovin, and K. F. Stal said that while political structures moved toward democratization, the core feudal foundations remained intact. Historians like F. A. Shcherbina, Vasily Potto and P. Korolenko criticized the Russian Empire's military intervention on the side of the nobility, calling it a fatal mistake that fueled long-term hostility among the Circassians against Russia.

=== Early Soviet period (1920s – 1950s) ===
During this phase, the battle was reinterpreted through the lens of Marxist class struggle, highlighting the resistance of the commoners against their oppressors. Early Soviet historiography characterized the war as only a class struggle between the aristocracy and the peasantry. However, this approach is criticized for focusing on economic and political power while ignoring the cultural codes and the authority of Adyghe Khabze as one of the primary reasons. The commoner units within the Bzhedug army indicates that the conflict cannot be explained by class analysis alone, as the population fought alongside the nobility due to their commitment to traditional codes. R. Trakho, a Circassian historian, described the event as a tragic chapter where an unorganized nation faced internal social conflicts; he noted that despite the nobility's tactical success on the battlefield, the enormous losses forced them to surrender most of their hereditary privileges. Another researcher, Y. N. Raenko-Turansky, introduced the concept of the "Abzakh Revolution," suggesting the conflict was a clash between feudal lords and emerging trade capital, though this theory was later criticized by other scholars.

=== Late Soviet and modern period (1960s – present) ===
The present period is a complex scientific analysis and the use of new archival documents. Historian V. K. Gardanov stated that the battle did not represent a transition between social systems, but rather an "intra-formational crisis of feudalism". Building on this, researchers like V. Kazharov and B. Dzhimov argued that class exploitation continued even after the democratic shift. A. Chirg offered a different perspective, viewing the battle as a clash between two different ways of unifying Western Circassia: centralization from "above" (nobility) versus centralization from "below" (the masses). M. V. Pokrovsky stated that by supporting the nobility, the Russian Empire failed to grasp local social dynamics, effectively pushing the broader population toward anti-Russian sentiment.

== Legacy ==
The Battle of Bziyiqo was the first major and most important military conflict in Western Circassia during a period when aristocratic rule was shaken and political structures based on popular will gained strength. The battle ended without restoring the administrative authority or judicial rights of the noble families over the Shapsug territory. Despite the conflict was initially concentrated in Shapsug-Bzhedug territories, its consequences affected all of Western Circassia and weakened the power of the aristocracy. The aristocratic authority was replaced by a system of governance consisting of a council of elders elected by the people and called the "Tarko Khas" (Adyghe: ТхьэрыIо Хасэ, lit. 'Council of Oath'). After the war, Circassians were divided into two main groups according to their form of government, as also accepted in Russian literature: the "aristocratic" group including the Chemguy, Besleney, Kabardia, Bzhedug, and the "democratic" group consisting of Shapsug, Natukhaj, Abzakh.

Internal conflicts such as the Battle of Bziyiqo during this era, exhausted the Circassian population both physically and mentally. These domestic divisions are viewed as a factor that weakened communal unity and defensive capabilities at the start of the Russo-Circassian War. The participation of Russia caused a great hatred towards Russia among the Shapsug, Natukhaj and Abzakh and led them to become closer with the Ottoman Empire.

The social shift triggered by the Battle of Bziyiqo directly laid the ideological and structural foundations for the National Oath movement of the early 19th century. By dismantling the absolute judicial and administrative authority of the nobility, the revolution popularized the concept of "Mutual oath-ship" (ЗэтхьарIогъу) as a legitimate form of national governance. The Council of Oath system established in the aftermath of the conflict served as a local prototype for the broader National Oath assemblies that would later seek to unify Circassia under a single country and a law.

The Battle of Bziyiqo served as a historical precedent for subsequent popular movements in the region, including the Bzhedug Peasant Uprising of the mid-19th century.

=== Novel ===
The Battle of Bziyiqo is the central subject of the epic novel Bziyiqo zau (The Battle of Bziyiqo), written by the Circassian poet and writer Ishak Mashbash. Published in two volumes in 1976 and 1978, the work was later translated into Russian in 1982 under the title Raskaty dalekogo groma (Peals of Distant Thunder). It has since been published in other languages, including Arabic and Turkish, in cities such as Amman and Ankara.

The novel depicts the social and political landscape of late 18th-century Western Circassia and focuses on the class conflicts that culminated in the battle. Mashbash used historical documents and folkloric elements to provide a psychological and realistic analysis of the events. The work is recognized in Circassian literature for documenting the transition of Shapsug, Natukhaj, and Abzakh regions during the Circassian Revolution. Mashbash, a recipient of state awards in both Russia and Adygea, is noted for his series of historical novels that examine national identity and historical shifts.

=== Memorial monument ===
A stone monument for the Battle of Bziyiqo was established in the Najida field near the village of Novodmitrievskaya. The project was initiated in 1995 by Ruslan Yemizh, Aslambi Kuashe, and Hisa Beretere. The sculptor Anton Aramaisovich Shekoyan created the monument based on the conceptual guidance of the Circassian writer Nalbi Queqo. Construction support was provided by Ghazi Hacheqo, and Asker Tliuzh assisted in the administrative process. The monument features carvings of a Circassian mother and the bodies of fallen men to denote the casualties of the battle.

As of 2016, Hisa Beretere noted that the monument remained outside of official government registries. Proposals to formalize its status include officially recording it in the state registry, transferring administrative documents from private possession to public authorities, and assigning local schools in Takhtamukay, Yablonovsky, and Enem to maintain the site. Organizers also recommend holding annual memorial meetings involving regional organizations and educational institutions to teach the history of the event.

The monument made by Anton Shekoyan

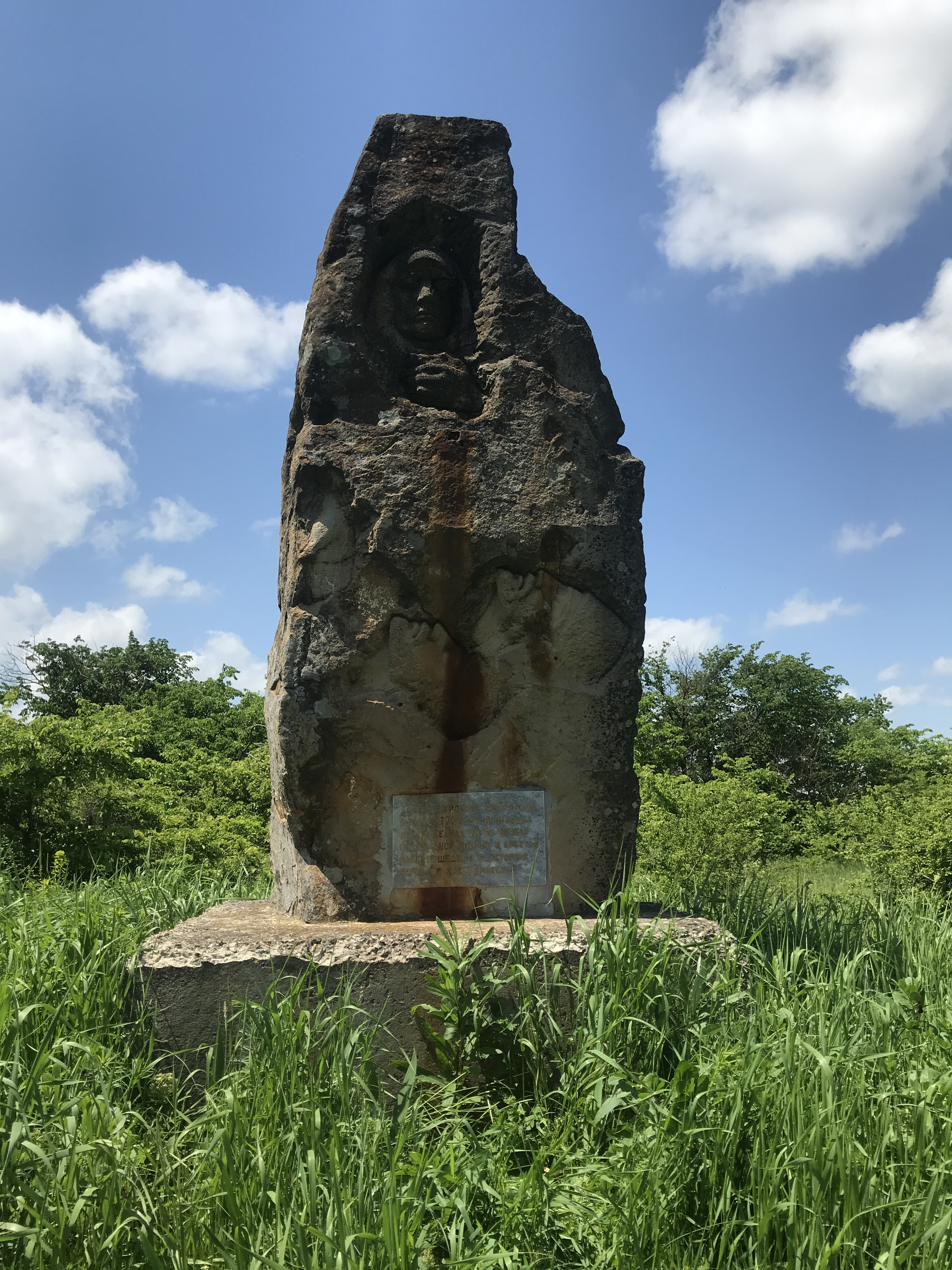

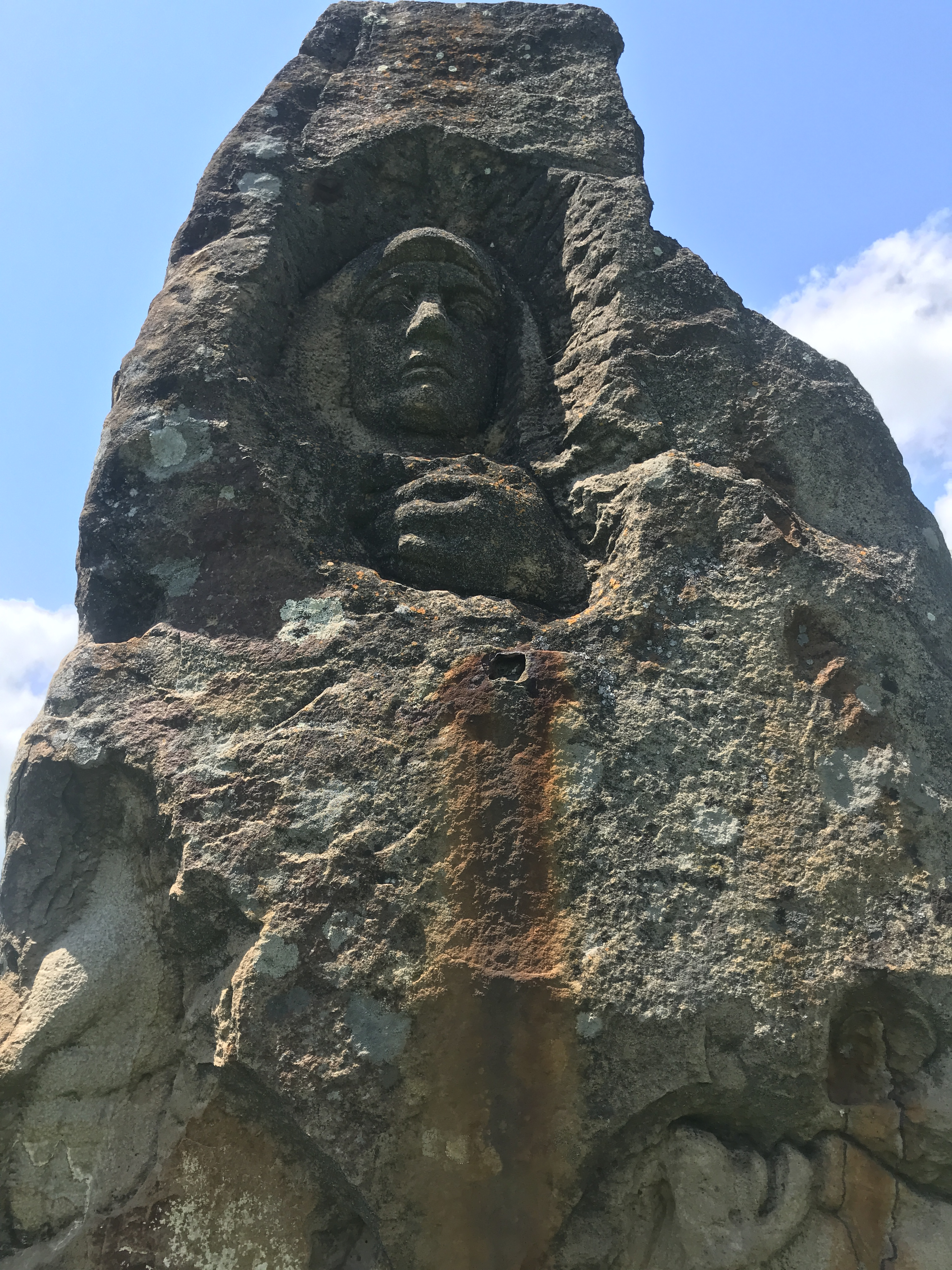

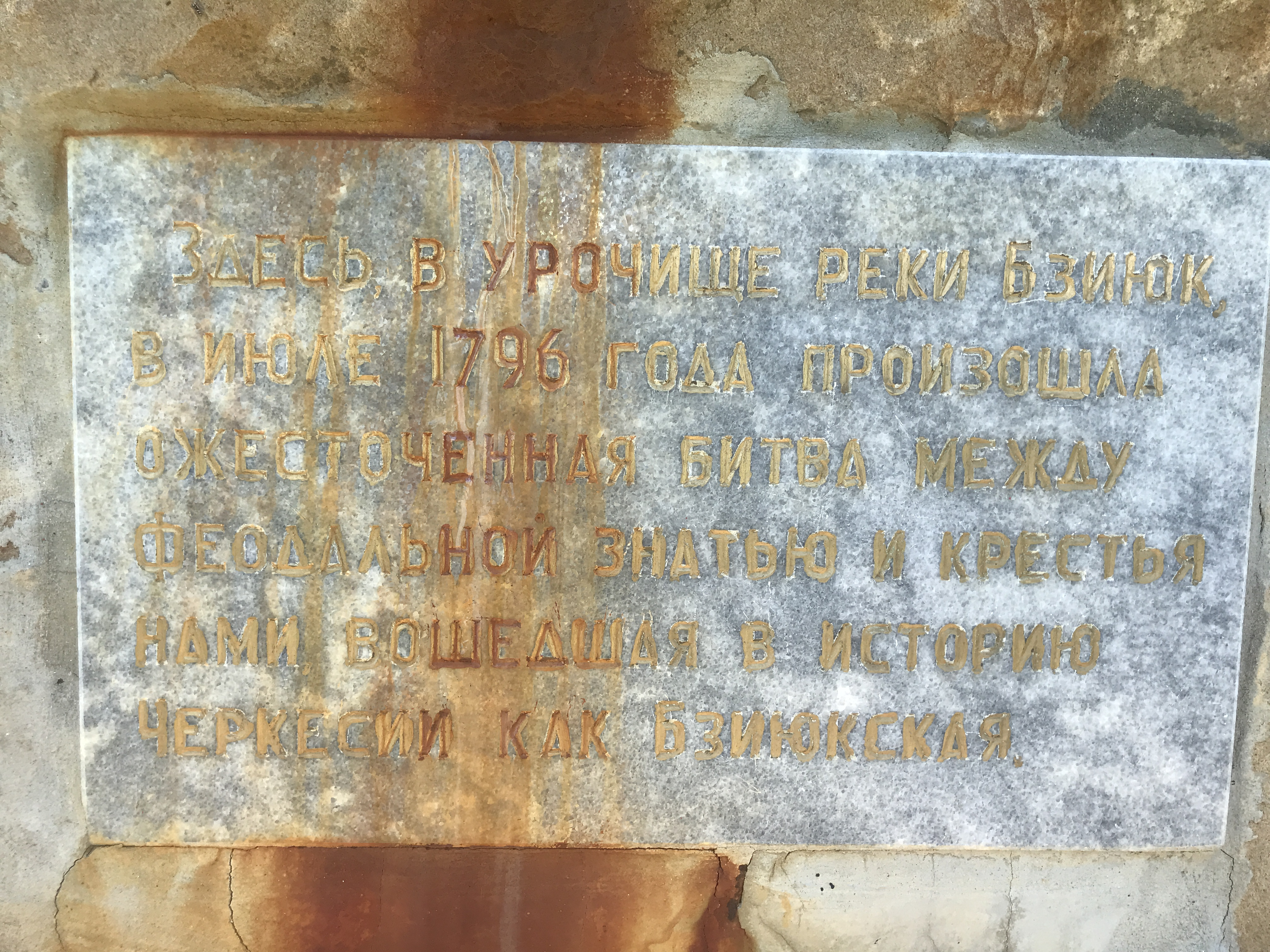

Translation of the Russian inscription on the monument: "Here, in the Bziyuk River valley, in July 1796, a fierce battle took place between the feudal nobility and the peasants, which entered the history of Circassia as the Battle of Bziyuk" (Russian: Здесь, в урочище реки Бзиюк, в июле 1796 года произошла ожесточенная битва между феодальной знатью и крестьянами, вошедшая в историю Черкесии как Бзиюкская).

In 2023, the State Council of the Republic of Adygea authorized restoration work on the Bziyiqo Battle monument following citizen requests regarding its condition. The reconstruction of the memorial, overseen by deputies Sefer Sheudzhen and Asker Dzetl, was completed by autumn of that year. The project included structural repairs to the monument and the improvement of the surrounding grounds. Regional officials have proposed including the memorial in the official register of cultural heritage sites to facilitate its long-term preservation.

An Adyghe inscription was added during the restoration in addition to the existing Russian one: "In memory of those who fell in the Battle of Bziyiqo. May it never happen again! Let us not forget this tragedy. May it never happen again!" (Adyghe: Бзыикъо заом щыфэхыгъэхэм яшIэжь. Ныбжьи къерэмыгъэзэжь! Мы лажьэр тщэрэмыгъупш. Ныбжьи къерэмыгъэзэжь!).
