= Circassian Revolution =

Conflicts and social changes in 17th-19th century Circassia

Revolution in Circassia Адыгэ Пщы-оркътедз
- Part of the Age of Revolution and the Russo–Circassian War
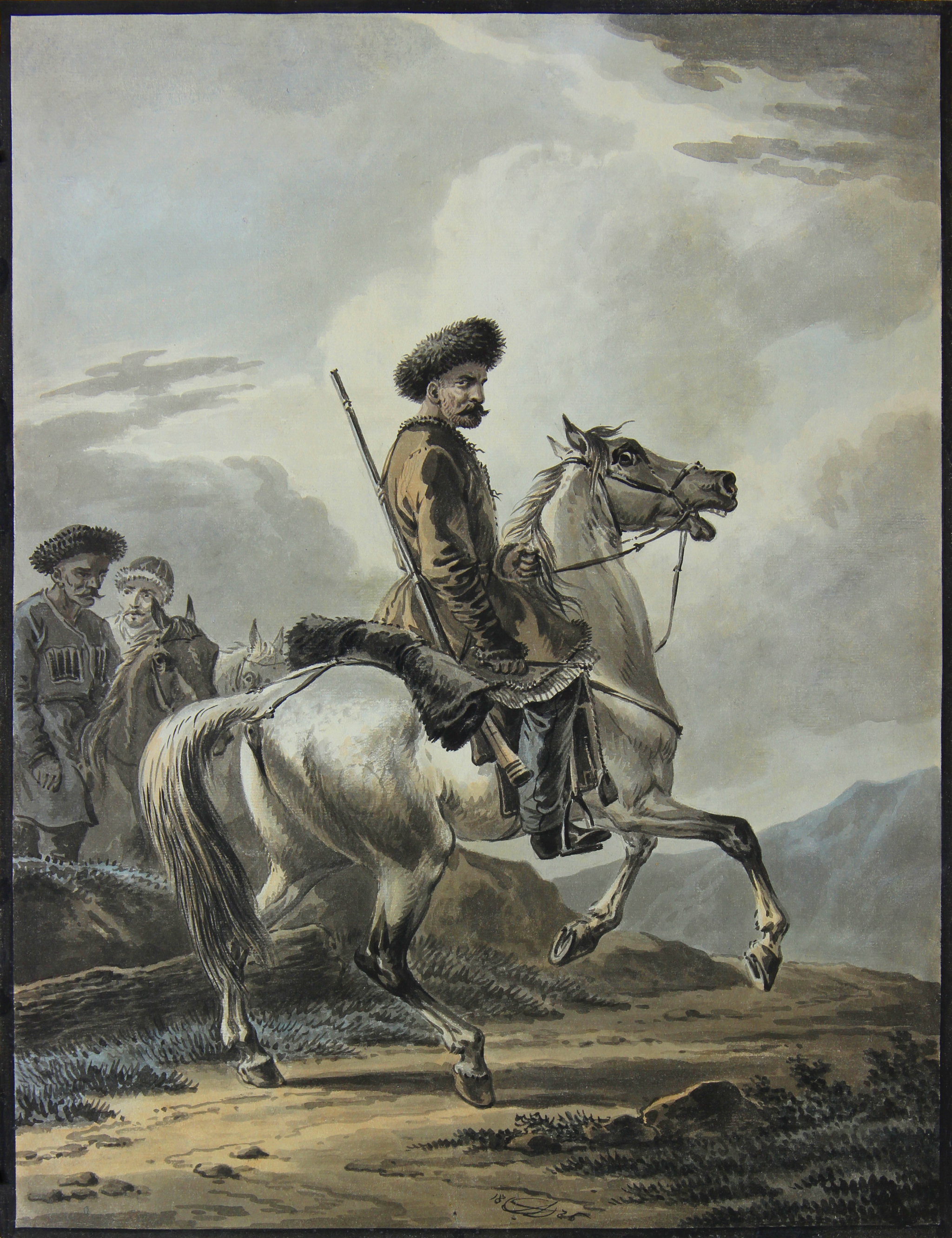
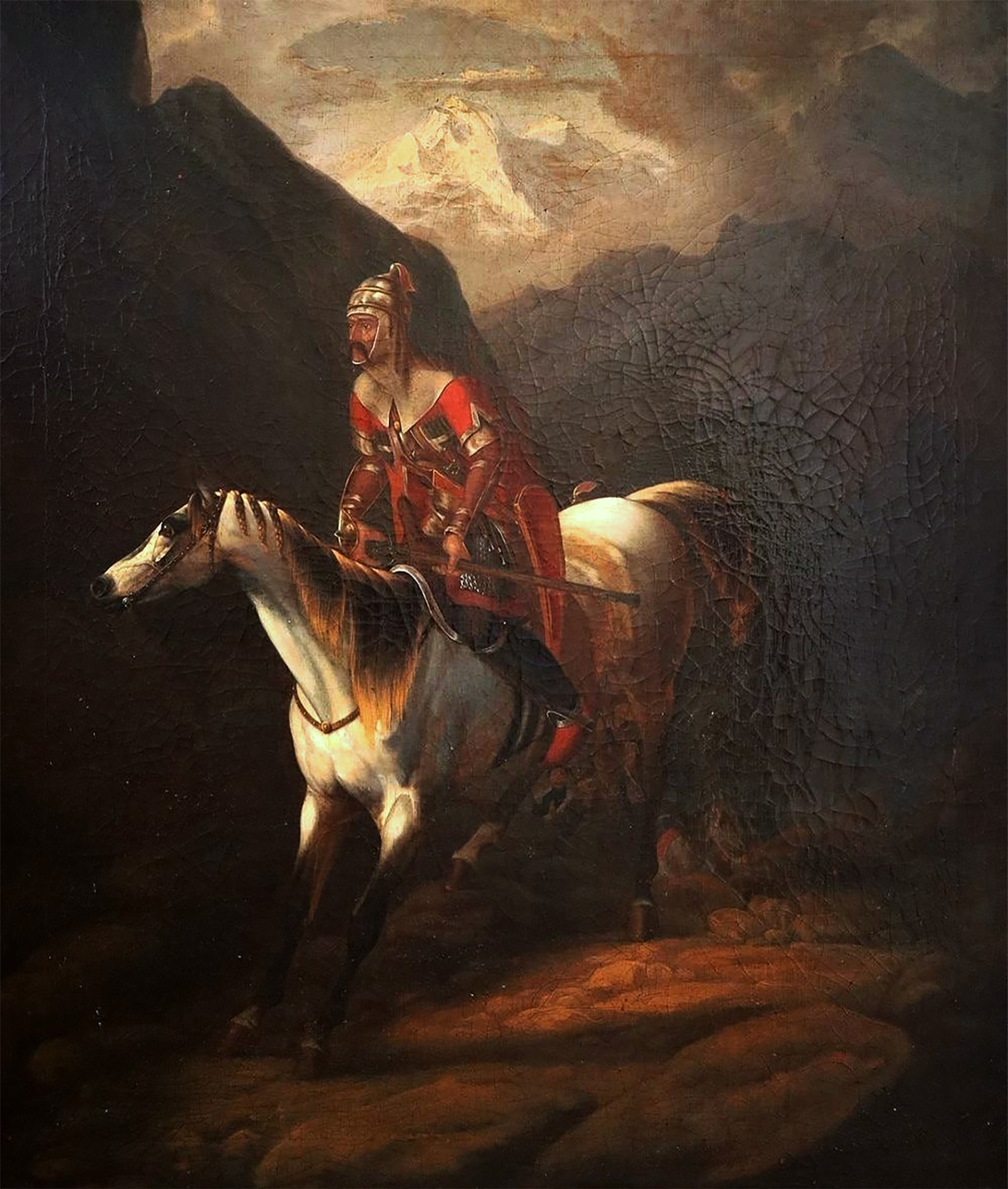
- Circassian peasants (left) and a Circassian noble (right)
Date	17th–19th centuries
Location	Circassia
Result	Equality of all people recognized by nobles; Abolishment of nobility and serfdom in many regions of Circassia; Many nobles executed or exiled; Sharia courts (mehkeme) replace traditional courts; Leader elections held to replace princes in some regions

Belligerents
Reformists: Peasants; Serfs; Minor nobles; Islamists; Sharia movement (in Kabardia); Muridism movement (in Western Circassia); Abzakh Republic; Natukhaj brotherhoods Shapsug brotherhoods Bzhedug Peasant Republic (1828; 1856-1859) Hatuqay People's Government (1862–1863); Yegeruqay People's Government (1862–1863); Chemguy People's Government (1862–1863) Diplomatic support: Ottoman Empire	Anti-Reformists: Grand Principality of Kabarda; Principality of Chemguy; Bzhedugia; Principality of Cherchenay; Principality of Khimishiy; Aristocrats; Abzakh nobles; Natukhaj nobles; Shapsug nobles; Military support: (Russian Empire) Russian Empire; Nogai and Crimean nobles

Commanders and leaders
Kabardia: Adildjeriy Hatokhshoqo; Effendi Ishaq Abukov; Mamsiruqo Dameley X Chip Kalebech; Bisho Merem Western Circassia: Aslandjeriy Cherchanuqo; Haji-Muhammad; Suleiman-Effendi; Muhammad Amin Asiyalav; Kimcheriy Khanahoko; Haji Depchen; Hapleqo Ghubj †; Ahmed Shupako †; Thakhuakho Nepasho; Thakhuakho Ajighuy...and others	Kabardia: Qasey Hatokhshoqo; Misost Bematuqo; Hamirza Qeytuqo Western Circassia: Seferbiy Zaneqo; Pshiquy Akhezhaqo; Bezruqo Boletuqo †; Alqas Hadjemuqo; Pshimaf Kunchukoko †; Batcheriy Hadjemuqo †; Pshimaf Bateqo; Alisultan Sheretluqo; Naghomuqo Sheretluqo; Kirimcheriyeqo Sheretluqo; Qalebatuqo Muhammad; Netakho Bechuq; Abat Nemer; Yedij Berzej...and others Russia: Aleksey Yermolov; Lt. Col. Yeremeyev

The Revolution in Circassia (Adyghe: Адыгэ Пщы-оркътедз; (Note: literally: 'Circassian (Адыгэ)' + 'toppling of the princes (пщы) and nobles (оркъ)') also called the "Democratic Movement") refers to various social changes in 17th-19th century Circassia which led to the eradication or weakening of social classes and the establishment of a council-based, "democratic" social structure in the most populous regions. This was achieved by reforms of some Circassian leaders, as well as a series of violent revolts by Circassian peasants known locally as the Peasants' War (Adyghe: Фэкъолӏ зау). The events were motivated by both religious and secular reasons, though the reformists cited the Qur'an as their source of inspiration.

In the 17th-18th centuries, Abzakh, Shapsug and Natukhaj regions overthrew their princes and severely undermined the nobility, while in 1856 the peasants of the Bzhedug region massacred the nobility and declared a peasant republic, which resisted the Russian Empire until 1859. In 1862, regions of Hatuqay, Chemguy and Yegeruqay also abandoned their monarchies and held elections; but this was brief as they were annexed by Russia in less than a year.

== History ==
=== Background ===
The Treaty of Zuhab, which concluded wars between the Ottomans and Safavid Persians in 1639, had a profound effect on the Circassian social structure. The treaty placed the Western Caucasus under Ottoman influence, this allowed the Crimean Khanate to consolidate Islam in the region, which became an ideological tool for the upcoming social changes.

=== Peasant revolts ===
Around the middle of the 17th century, a "fierce struggle" broke out between the free men and the nobles. According to accounts by James Stanislaus Bell, this conflict resulted in the power of the nobles being "effectually broken". In the 1630s, Abzakh peasants, supported by fugitive serfs from the Bzhеdug, Chemguy, and other princely domains, launched a revolt against the Bzhedug princes.

The Battle of Woshnau (ОщнэIу зау), which is a part of this war in oral sources, where Bzhedug and Chemguy princes, allied with Kabardian princes, attacked the Abzakhs for harboring fugitive peasants and to appoint a prince to Abzakhs. Fighting in Woshnau Forest, the Abzakhs secured victory by trapping and destroying the coalition's vanguard in the valley. According to Yusuf Suad Naghuch, this battle was part of a war called the "Hakuch War."

By approximately 1639, the uprising succeeded in expelling the Bzhedug feudal lords from the upper and middle basin of the Psekups River. Contemporary sources noted that during this period the tribes "destroyed their nobility".

In the 18th century, the Abzakh launched a military offensive against the Bzhedug princes. This conflict resulted in the Abzakh seizing the entire Psekups basin and forcing the Bzhedug to move north toward the Kuban River. T. Khadzhimukov wrote, "...the Abzakhs sent two strong detachments under the command of Yedij and Nedjuqo (these names are aristocratic family names), who burned with implacable hatred toward the Khimish princes. A long-standing war broke out, ending with the Abzakhs taking possession of the entire Psekups basin up to the Chegiyakho River and forcing the Bzhedugs to move towards the Kuban."

In 1795, a delegation of Bzhedug princes and Shapsug nobles traveled to St. Petersburg and warned the Russian empress that their subjects were preparing to "establish a republic in the Trans-Kuban". This statement was intended to stoke Russian fears of the French Revolution. The Empress, "seeing ... a manifestation of the revolutionary spirit of French Jacobinism," sent assistance to the nobles in the form of Cossack armies. It is also known that France and especially Napoleon were respected in Circassia.

On 10 July 1796, the Battle of Bziyiqo (Бзыикъо зау) took place between the Shapsug and Abzakh people's militias and the Russian-supported Bzhedug nobility as the result of the rising tensions. The criminal behaviors of the Sheretluqo nobles among the Shapsugs had triggered the conflict. The Sheretluqo's sought refuge with the Bzhedug princes and formed an alliance. The weakened aristocrats turned to Russian military support to protect their land and political privileges. Bzhedug forces led by Prince Batcheriy Hadjemuqo, together with a Russian unit commanded by Lieutenant Colonel Yeremeyev, fought the Shapsug and Abzakh militias in Western Bzhedugia (Khimishiy). The Russian-Bzhedug side had artillery and won the battle, but Prince Batcheriy Hadjemuqo was killed during the battle. Despite the victory, the death of one of the most prominent noble figures weakened the power of the feudal nobility in Western Circassia.

During this period, Abzakhs has diminished the authority and privileged rights of the nobility through a peaceful process unlike their neighbours.

The most significant phase of the conflict, termed the "Democratic Coup," took place in the late 18th century. This period saw the rise of the "free Circassians" (Shapsugs, Natukhaj, and Abzakh) as a distinct political force, opposing the "aristocratic" tribes such as Bzhedug or Chemguy. The organizational basis for the uprising was the institution of "sworn brotherhoods". These unions of unrelated families bound by oath consolidated the power of the peasantry, allowing them to challenge the privileges of the nobility. The free peasants rapidly increased in number by accepting all kinds of refugees from the other tribes into their clans and swearing mutual oaths of protection.

Leaders were no longer hereditary but were elected by an open vote involving all adult members of a clan. Legislative councils were elected to enact rules regulating everyday life. Special councils possessed the authority to censor leaders for unsatisfactory performance and divest them of their powers. This unique experiment in pluralism distinguished the Western "democratic" tribes from the "aristocratic" tribes. In the Circassian flag, the twelve golden stars stand for the nine "aristocratic" tribes and the three "democratic" tribes.

Many of the deposed Circassian aristocrats chose to live in exile in Russia, a migration that occurred roughly during the same period that French aristocrats sought refuge in the Tsarist empire following the French Revolution.

The common people of the Shapsug tribe overthrew their overlords at the beginning of the 19th century. In 1803, a significant congress known as Psichetiqo Assembly (Adyghe: Псычетыкъо зэфэс) was held to establish a new legal framework. The assembly delimited the rights of the nobility and the people. A key outcome was the equalization of the "price of blood": the life of a free peasant was valued equally to that of a noble. Previously, the life of a noble demanded a much higher compensation.

During the Russo-Turkish War of 1806–1812, a battle took place on 19 October 1807 (or in 1808) between the Abzakh and Russian-backed feudal aristocrats. The reason was the aristocracy's acceptance of Russian protection in order to preserve their property and political privileges. Grand Prince of Chemguy, Bezruqo Boletuqo had aimed to unite all the West Circassian principalities under a single political banner against the "democratic" tribes in order to protect aristocratic rights. Russian forces under the command of Lieutenant Colonel Yermeyev, together with their allies, the Chemguy grand prince Bezruqo Bolotoqo, Ademey and Nogai allies, attacked the Abzakh with an army of approximately 12,000 men. During a cavalry charge, Prince Bezruqo was killed by Abzakh infantry, and the battle ended in an Abzakh victory.

In the early 19th century, Aslandjeriy Cherchanuqo, the grand prince of the Principality of Hatuqay, decreed on his deathbed that every serf in the principality be freed according to Islamic obligations, and slavery should be abolished.

In 1827–1828, a conflict erupted between the commoners and the nobility in Bzhedughia. Pshiquy Akhezhaqo, the grand prince of Cherchenay, took refuge with the Abzakhs and restored the rights of the aristocrats citing Islam's principle of equality. In 1828, Bzhedug peasants successfully overthrew their nobility and established a people's government for eight months before being suppressed by aristocratic forces.

The struggle between the classes continued into the mid-19th century. In 1846, the common people of the Natukhaj and Shapsug tribes carried out a massive confiscation of property from the nobility.

In 1851, the Bzhedug peasants refused to swear allegiance to Russia, unlike their aristocrats; they surrendered when the Russian army entered their lands threatening to attack villages. During the Russian rule, in 1853, peasants began organizing against the nobility with the support of Muhammad Amin (key organizers: Kimcheriy Khanahoko, Haji Depchen, Shahancheriyeqo Pshimaf). Cossack ataman Kuharenko backed the princes with the Russian army to prevent Muhammad Amin from gaining power in the region, and in May two Russian detachments were stationed in the region. On 24 May 1853, fierce clashes took place at Oshkhanuqo between Muhammad Amin and the Russian army. Muhammad Amin withdrew due to artillery fire. In 1855, the aristocrats requested a special aristocratic court for the Bzhedug from the Black Sea Cossack Army command, but it was rejected due to the pressure of peasants; the peasants convened general assemblies to establish an equal government.

In 1856, peasants demanded that the aristocrats give up all their feudal rights and privileges. When the aristocrats refused, the peasants began to take up arms and prepared to fight. In January, some of the important aristocrat leaders were at the guest house of Prince Yelbezduqo Yendar in Ponezhukay village. They were surrounded by armed peasants in the village; after the clashes, the house was set on fire and those who came out were shot. 25 aristocrats, including their leader Prince Pshimaf Kunchukuko, were killed. As the revolution spread, captured knights were released only if they swore an oath renouncing all rights and property; some remaining aristocrats fled with their families and founded a new village called Bjegokay. The region declared a republic and transitioned to a democratic order governed by a 17-member parliament, chaired by Kimcheriy Khanahoko with Haji Depchen as judge. In 1856–1857, Russian forces under Colonel Borzikov launched expeditions to crush the poorly armed peasant militia, destroying the centers of resistance. The Bzhedug Republic opposed Russia and took part in the struggle until the final occupation by Russian forces in 1859.

In 1863, regions of Hatuqay, Chemguy and Yegeruqay also abandoned their monarchies and switched to a democratic system; but this was brief as they were annexed by Russia in less than a year.

=== Sharia movement ===
==== Kabardia ====
Following the Foundation of Mozdok in 1763 and the subsequent outbreak of the Russo-Circassian War, the traditional political system of Kabardia, which was based on a confederation of allied princes, proved insufficient to defend the country's independence. This gave birth to the Sharia movement (Шариатское движение), which had the primary goal of to unifying the fragmented Circassian society against Russian colonial expansion by replacing traditional customary law (adat) with Islamic law (Sharia).

In 1767, under the leadership of Chip Kalebech and Bisho Merem, 10,000 slaves in Kabardia revolted, broke away from the aristocrats, and settled in Pyatigorsk. The aristocrats eventually reached an agreement with the slaves to stop the rebellion and the slaves returned to their former lands.

In 1769, a much larger slave/peasant revolt broke out in Kabardia, led by Mamsiruqo Dameley. Although religious figures attempted to stop the fight between the two sides, the rebellion continued as the slaves refused to return to feudal rule. An excerpt from the Song of Dameley: "We are groaning under the noble's yoke, An ill-fated life, A wretched life." According to oral folklore, Dameley was killed through the traps of the aristocrats. People had liked Dameley and because he was considered sacred, people took pieces from his gravestone for healing purposes, eventually leaving nothing of the statue behind. It was used especially in the treatment of malaria. People believed that the nobility would disappear when Dameley's gravestone was gone.

Supporters of the Sharia movement believed that Kabardian society needed a new ideological foundation. Traditional codes which sanctioned social inequality and political decentralisation could no longer serve this purpose. Instead, the movement turned to the Islamic principle of the "equality of all believers before God" to consolidate society. In the 1790s, the movement was led by the fugitive Prince Adil-Giray Atazhukin and the Effendi (Islamic scholar) Ishaq Abukov. They opposed the courts established by the Russian administration in 1793, which were based on old traditions and were seen as tools of colonial control.

On 5 July 1799, General Knorring reported to the Tsar that Atazhukin and nine nobles had sworn an oath on the Qur'an to establish a "Religious Court" to judge national disputes according to Sharia law. Initially, the movement sought to introduce equality between the princes (pshi) and the nobles (worq). In 1806, following mass unrest and the failure of Russian military expeditions to fully subdue the region, the movement succeeded in establishing Sharia courts (Mehkeme) in Great and Little Kabardia. The participants of the movement took an oath on the Qur'an and proclaimed:

"Why should we not have this among ourselves when it exists in France?"

The key features of this "Spiritual Government" in Kabardia included a criminal law reform, which abolished the traditional system of composition (paying blood money based on rank) for serious crimes. Under Sharia, criminals faced capital or corporal punishment regardless of their social status. In addition, the Mehkeme, an Islamic court consisting of 12 members, including the Grand Prince, 2-3 princes, nobles, a secretary, and a qadi (judge), was established. During this period, Effendi Ishaq Abukov, now a popular leader, led the social Islamisation of Kabardia. Kabardians altered their dress, grew beards, and abandoned the consumption of alcohol and tobacco. In 1822, General Aleksey Yermolov invaded Kabardia, finally crushing the resistance. He abolished the Sharia courts and established the Provisional Kabardian Court, where aristocrats held power.

==== Western Circassia ====
While the movement was suppressed in Kabardia, Sharia began to spread among the Western Circassians in the 1820s, influenced by Turkish emissaries and the earlier events in Kabardia. In 1822, an assembly known as "Khautsekhyas" led to the adoption of Sharia over adat among the Shapsugs, undermining the power of the nobility.

The Sharia movement was revitalised in western Circassia by the representatives of Imam Shamil in Circassia: Haji-Muhammad, Suleiman-Efendi, and Muhammad Amin. This new movement came to be known as the Muridism movement. Muhammad Amin (1848–1859) attempted to create a centralised state in Western Circassia based on Sharia, establishing Mehkeme (courts), a standing army, and a tax system.

During his rule, Muhammad Amin pushed for abolishment of social classes. The principles of Muridism posed a direct threat to the traditional aristocracy in tribes like the Bzhedugs. The Sharia doctrine undermined the legitimacy of owning serfs and slaves, particularly if those serfs were fellow Muslims. In 1855, Muhammad Amin forced the Bzhedug aristocrats to take an oath to renounce their rights. Many princes and nobles were massacred and robbed by the Bzhedug commoners.
