= Zaramuk Kardangushev =

Zaramuk Paturovich Kardangushev
- КъардэнгъущӀ ПӀатӀурэ и къуэ Зырамыку
- Born: 10 January 1918; Psygansu, Urvansky District, Russian Republic
- Died: 25 December 2008 (aged 90); Nalchik, Kabardino-Balkaria, Russia
- Citizenship: RSFSR > USSR > Russia
- Occupations: Ethnographer, folklorist, playwright, actor
- Spouse: Zuleykhan Kuralayeva.
- Awards: Order of the Patriotic War, 1st class People's Artist of the Kabardino-Balkarian Republic

Zaramuk Paturovich Kardangushev (Kabardian: КъардэнгъущӀ ПӀатӀурэ и къуэ Зырамыку; 10 January 1918 - 25 December 2008) was a Soviet Kabardian (East Circassian) playwright, poet, and folklorist. He was awarded the title of People's Artist of the Kabardino-Balkarian Republic in 1993.

== Early life and education ==
Zaramuk Kardangushev was born on 10 January 1918 in the village of Zhankhotovo (now the village of Psygansu, Urvansky District of the Kabardino-Balkarian Republic).

After graduating from a rural school, he studied for some time at the Lenin Educational Campus in Nalchik and at a workers' faculty in Pyatigorsk. In 1935, he took part in a selection competition and was enrolled in the acting department of the Kabardian studio of the State Institute of Theatre Arts (GITIS) in Moscow. From his third year, he received a Stalin scholarship. He graduated with honors from the institute and returned to Nalchik in July 1940 with a degree in drama acting.

== Career ==
In 1940-1941, he was an actor in the Kabardian troupe of the Kabardino-Balkarian State Drama Theater in Nalchik. While a student at GITIS, he wrote his first play, which was also the first Kabardian play, "Kanshoubiy and Guashagag". The Kabardino-Balkarian State Drama Theater opened its first theatrical season in 1940 with this play. During the war, Zarmauk donated the royalties from this play to a fund for the production of a tank column.

Zaramuk fought in World War II in the Red Army. He served in the airborne troops and was wounded. For his military services, he was awarded the Order of the Patriotic War, 1st Class, and medals.

After demobilization, he worked again as an actor at the Kabardian State Drama Theater from 1946 to 1949. In 1956, he graduated with honors from the Kabardian State Pedagogical Institute and worked as an editor at the republican book publishing house.

From 1949 to 2003, he worked as a researcher in the Department of Folklore and Literature of the Kabardino-Balkarian Research Institute of History, Philology and Economics. He took part in folklore and ethnographic expeditions that collected the heroic Nart saga, ancient Kabardian songs, tales, legends, proverbs, and sayings. Together with the well-known scholars A. I. Aliyeva and A. M. Gadagatl, he worked on the academic edition of the volume "Narts. Adyghe Heroic Epic". He initiated the publication of the two-volume collection "Adyghe Folklore" in the Kabardian language (1963, 1968). From 1964, he was a member of the Union of Soviet Writers.

He was one of the compilers of the ethno-musical anthology "Folk Songs and Instrumental Tunes of the Adyghe" (1980-1991), and a collector and popular performer of ancient Kabardian folk songs. Zaramuk Kardangushev was the author of the first and only translation into the Kabardian language of Shora Nogmov's unique work, "History of the Adyghe People".

== Death ==
He died at the age of 90 on 25 December 2008. He was buried in his native village of Psygansu, Urvansky District of the Kabardino-Balkar Republic.

== Awards and honors ==
- Order of the Patriotic War, 1st class
- Honored Art Worker of the Kabardino-Balkarian ASSR (1961)
- Honored Cultural Worker of the Republic of Adygea
- People's Artist of the Kabardino-Balkarian Republic (1993)
- Laureate of the Mukhadin Kandour International Prize
- Certificates of Honor of the Presidium of the Supreme Soviet of the Kabardino-Balkarian ASSR (1978, 1992)

== Legacy ==
- On 8 November 2013, a festival-competition of Circassian folk songs dedicated to Zaramuk Kardangushev was held in Kabardino-Balkaria.
