= Salon of 1852 =

1852 art exhibition in Paris

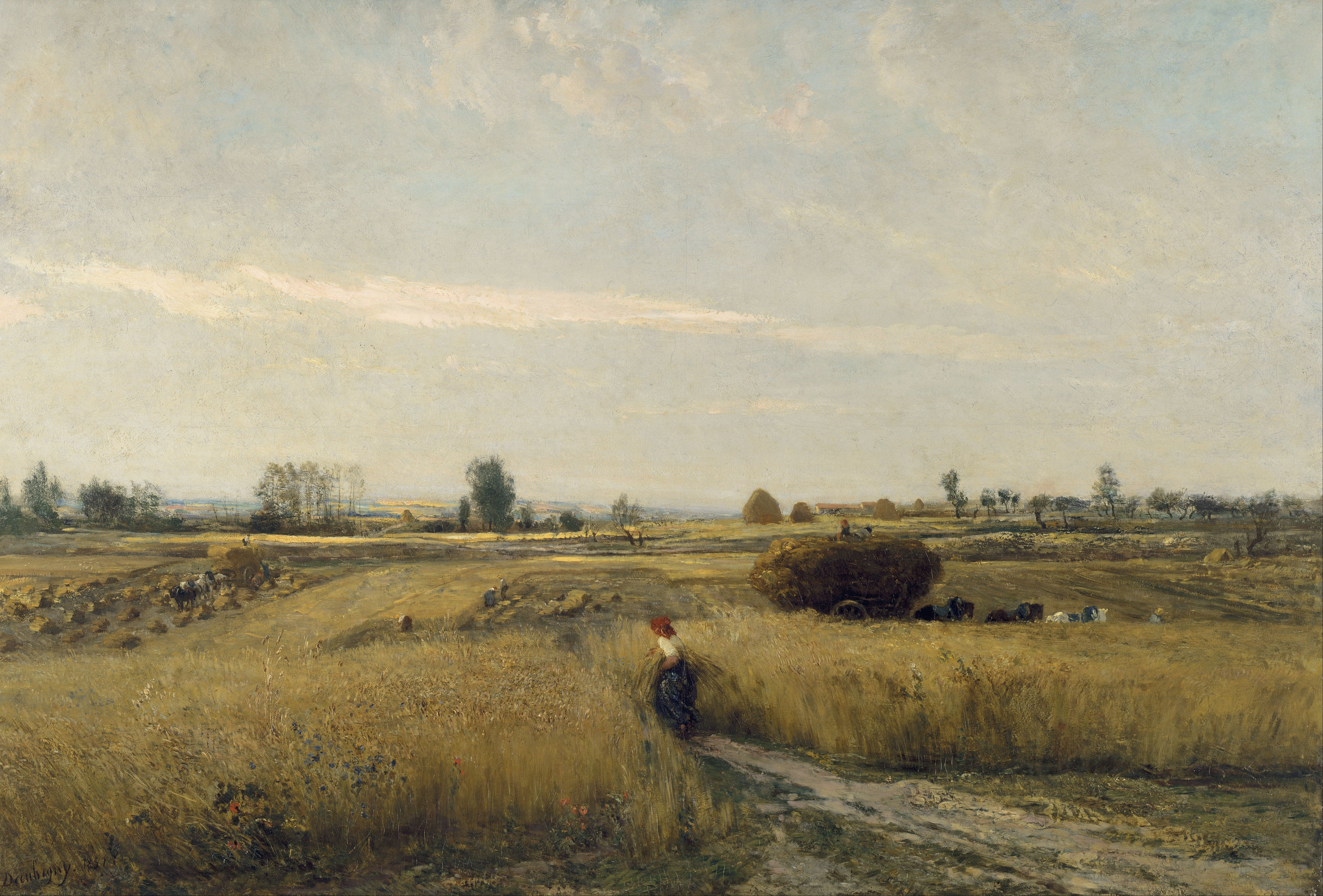
The Harvest by Charles-François Daubigny

The Salon of 1852 was an art exhibition held at the Palais-Royal in Paris 15 May and 31 October 1852. Organised by the Académie des Beaux-Arts, it took place in the Galerie d’Orléans.

It was the first Salon to be held following the December 1851 coup that overthrew the Second Republic, with Napoleon III proclaimed Emperor later that year. Charles-François Daubigny of the Barbizon School displayed a landscape painting The Harvest. Auguste-Barthélemy Glaize exhibited the history painting The Gallic Women. Théodore Rousseau's Oak Grove, Apremont was purchased by Charles, Duc de Morny, Napoleon's half-brother.

The veteran artist Horace Vernet displayed a scene of recent history The Siege of Rome showing the 1849 siege of the city. Commissioned for the Palace of Versailles received a negative reception from both the public and the art critics.

== Gallery ==
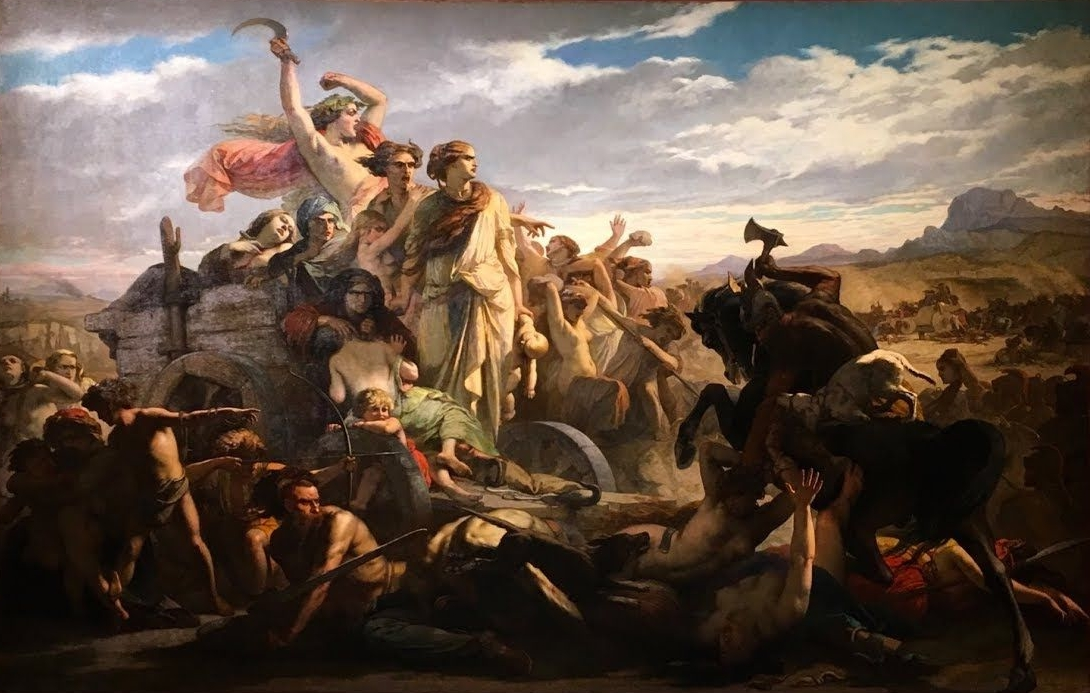
The Gallic Women by Auguste-Barthélemy Glaize

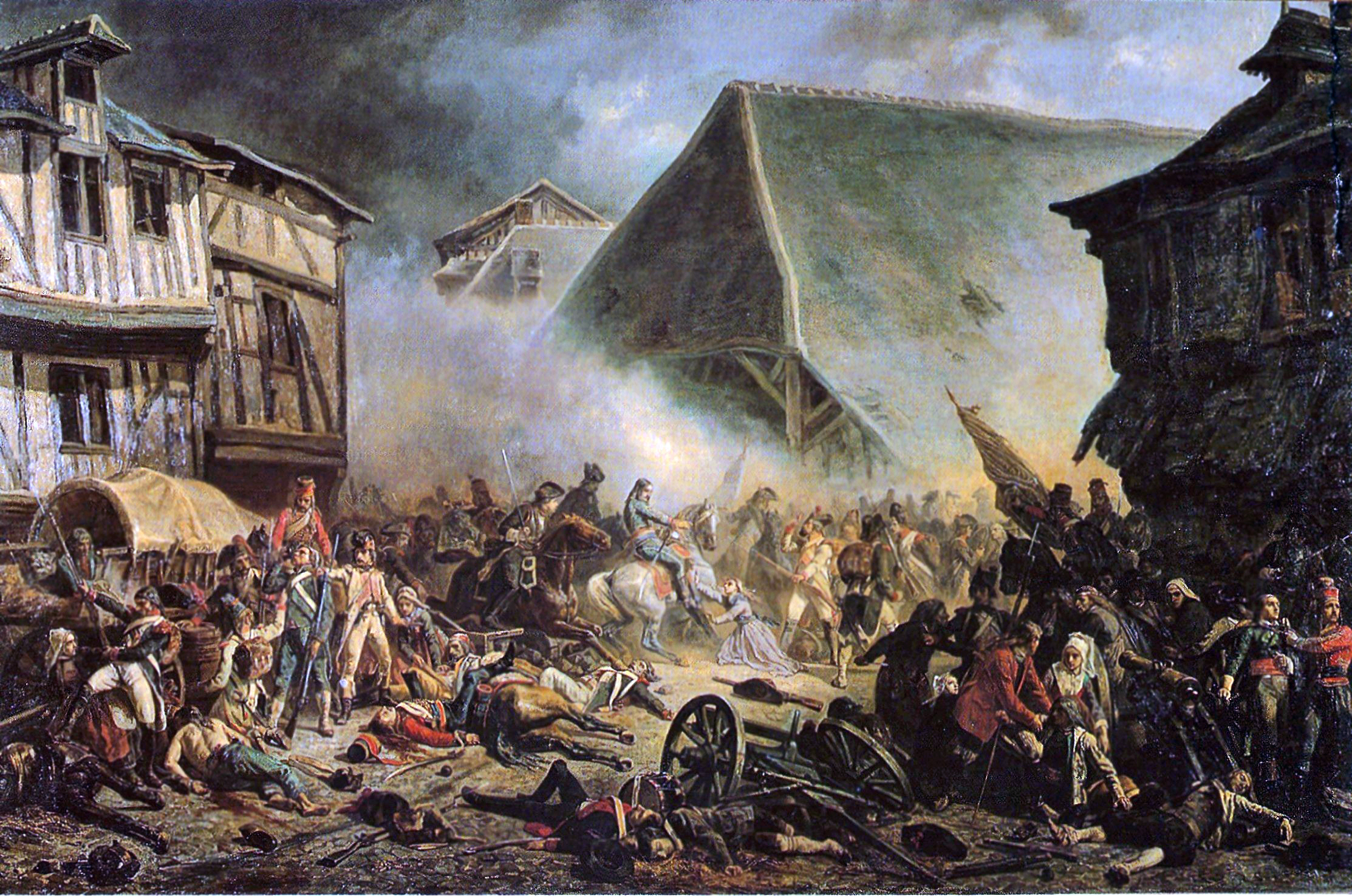
The Battle of Mans by Jean Sorieul

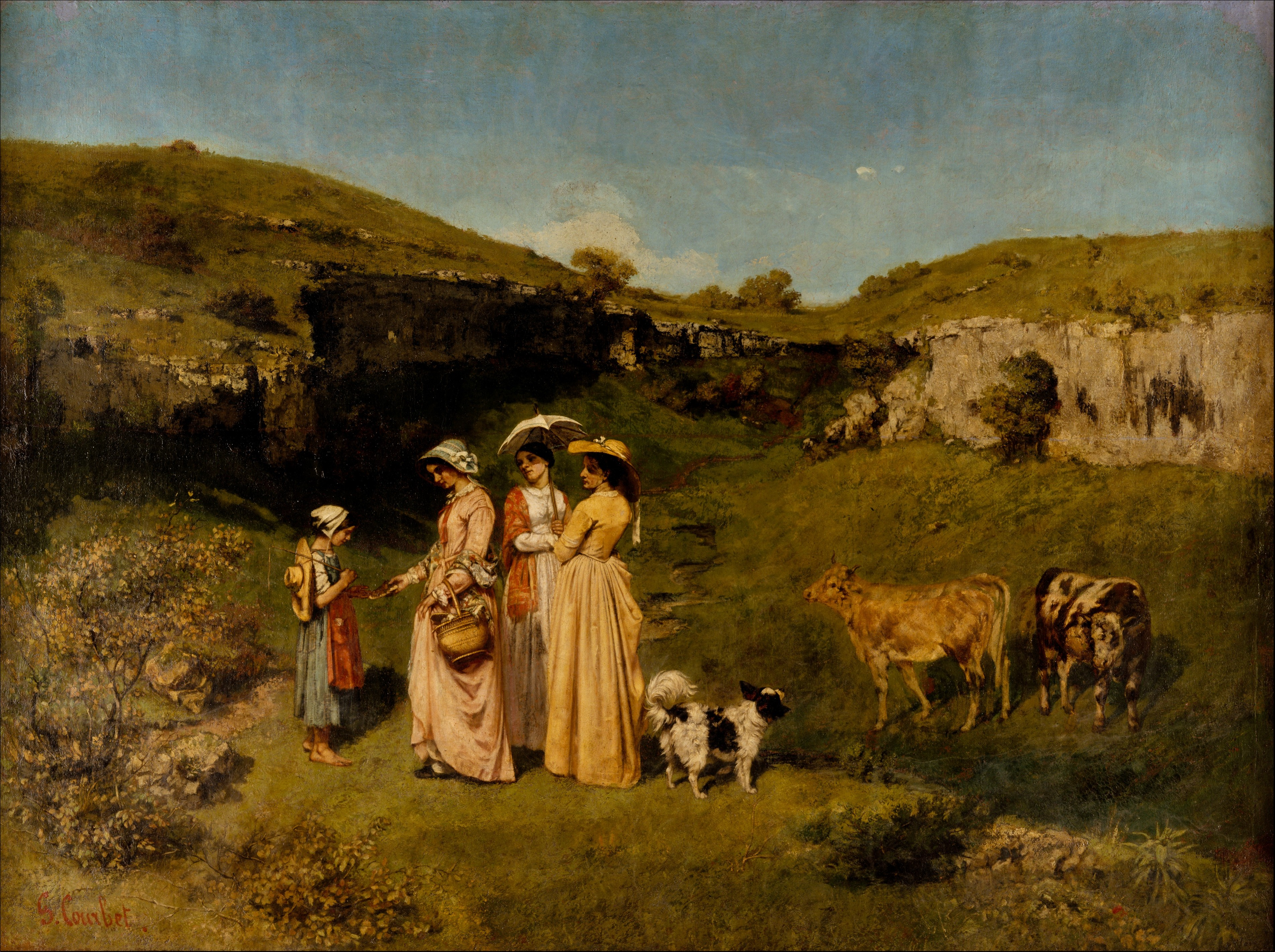
Young Ladies of the Village by Gustave Courbet

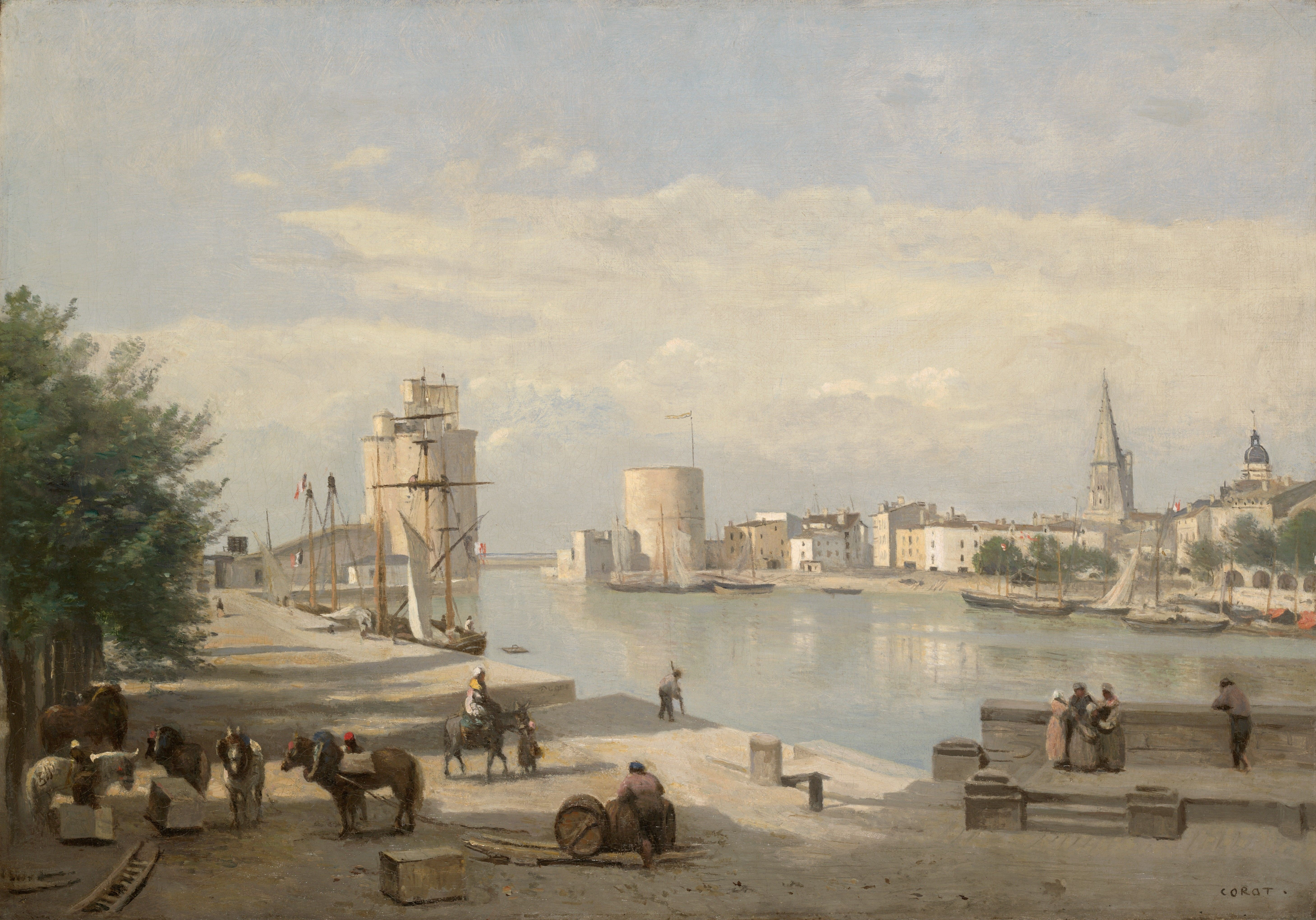
The Harbor of La Rochelle by Jean-Baptiste-Camille Corot

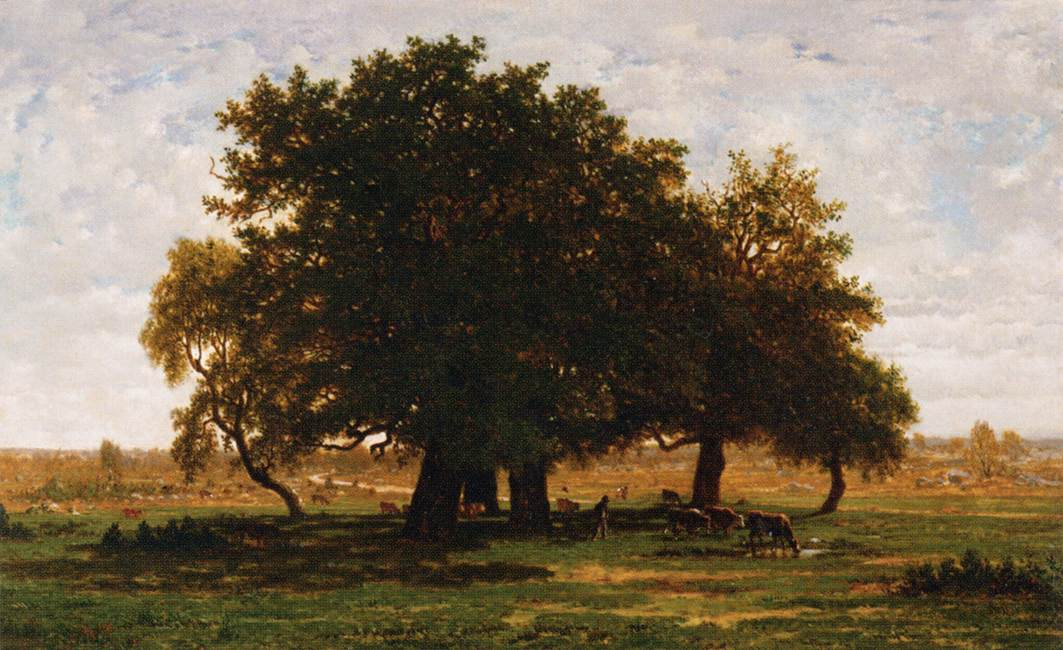
Oak Grove, Apremont by Théodore Rousseau

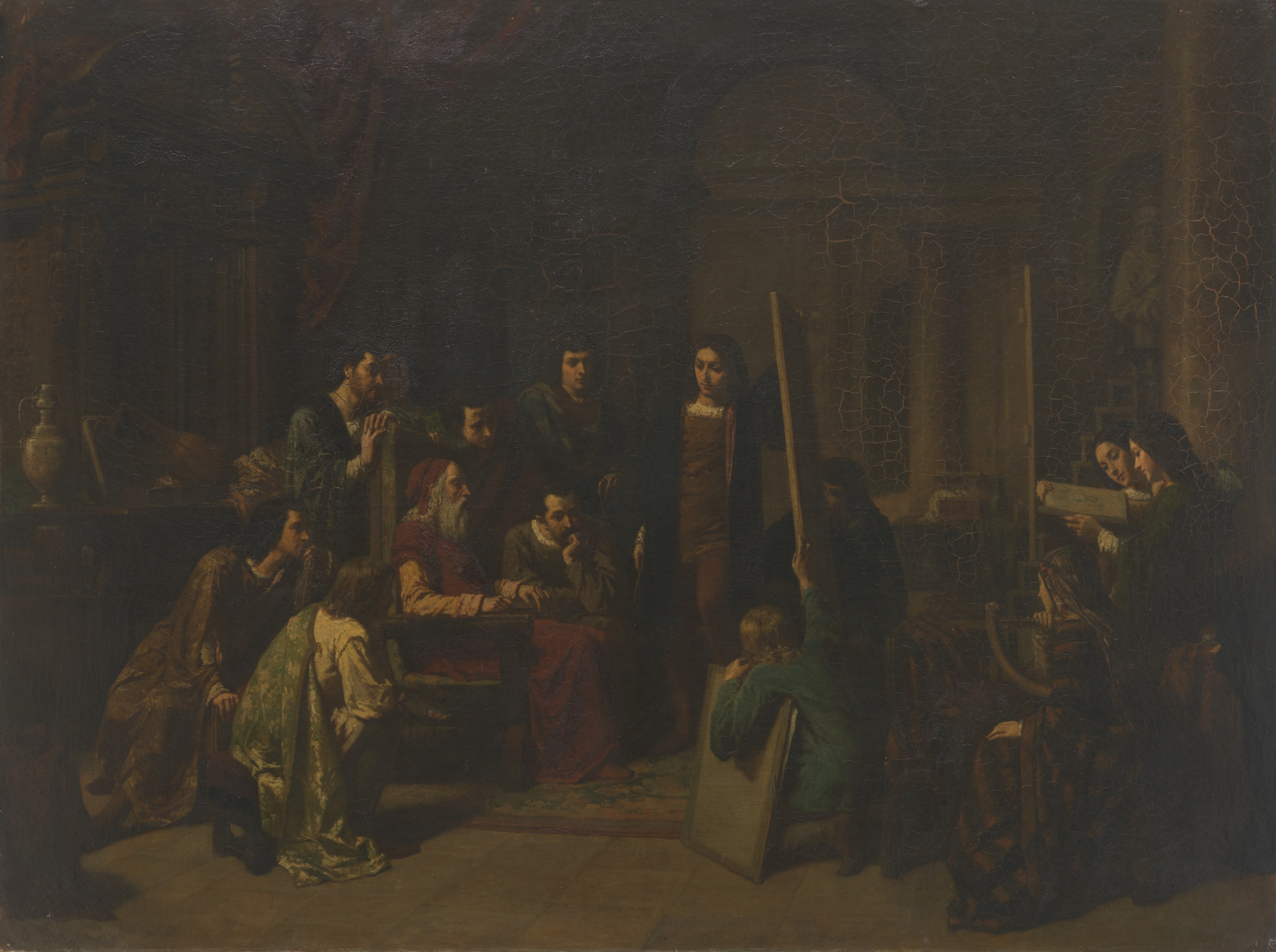
Leonardo da Vinci Among His Students by Jean-Baptiste Jules Trayer

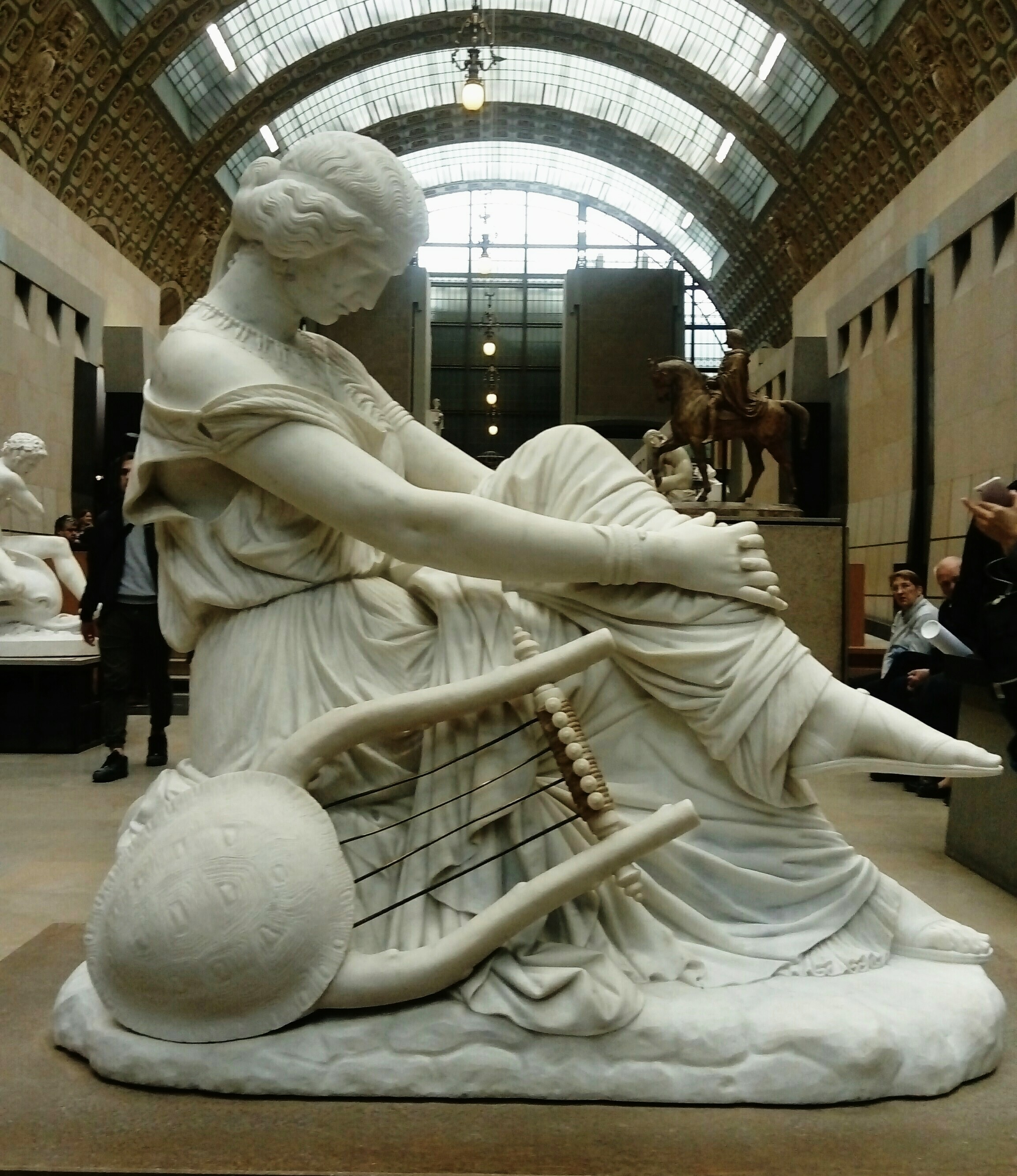
Sappho by James Pradier

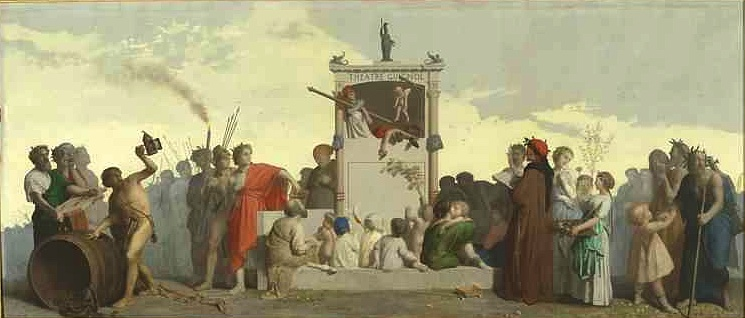
La Comédie Humaine by Jean-Louis Hamon

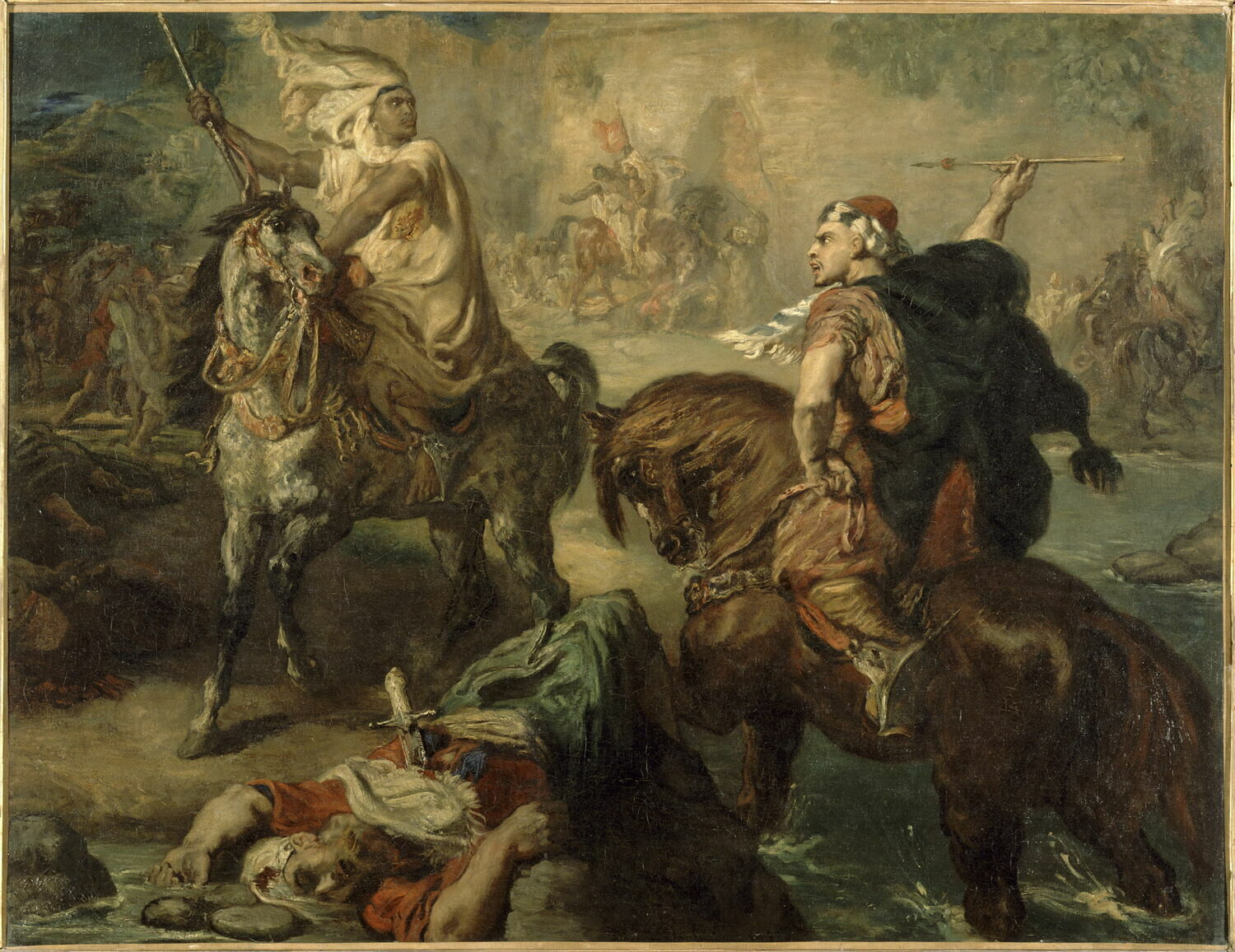
Arab Chiefs Challenging Each Other to Single Combat Under the Ramparts of a City by Théodore Chassériau

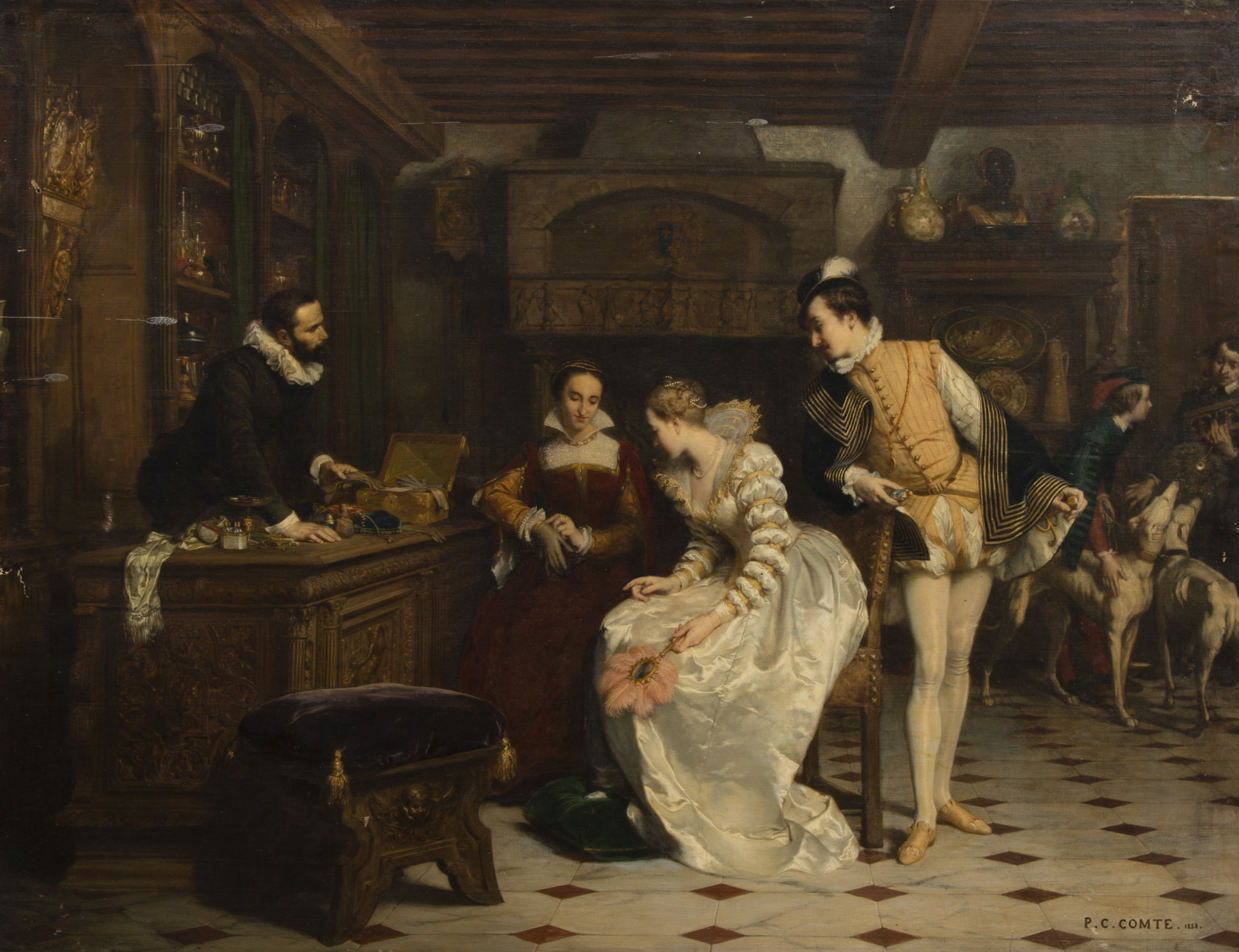
Jeanne d'Albret Buying Poisoned Gloves from Catherine de' Medici's Parfumeur by Pierre-Charles Comte

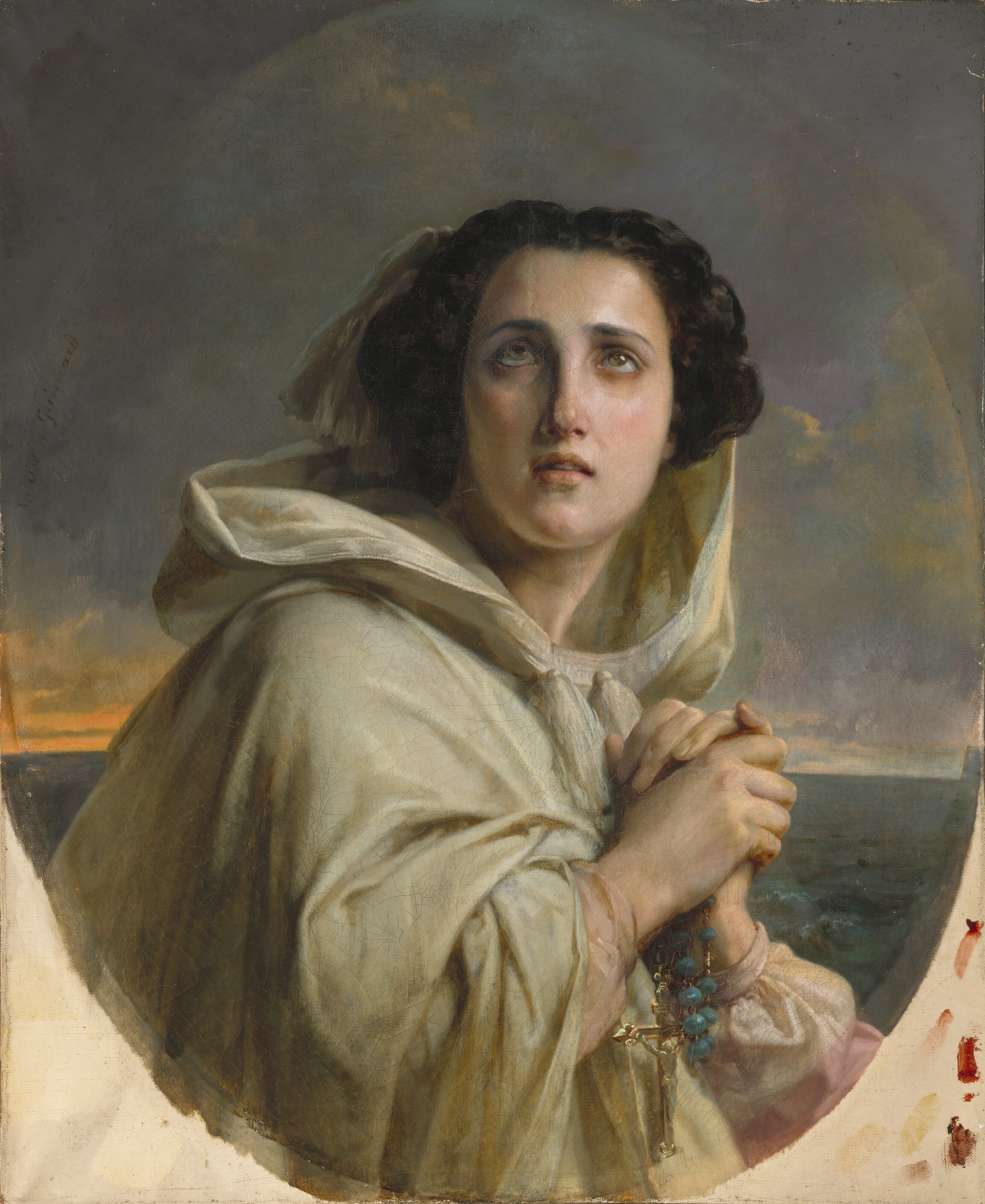
A Christian Slave by Louise Eudes de Guimard

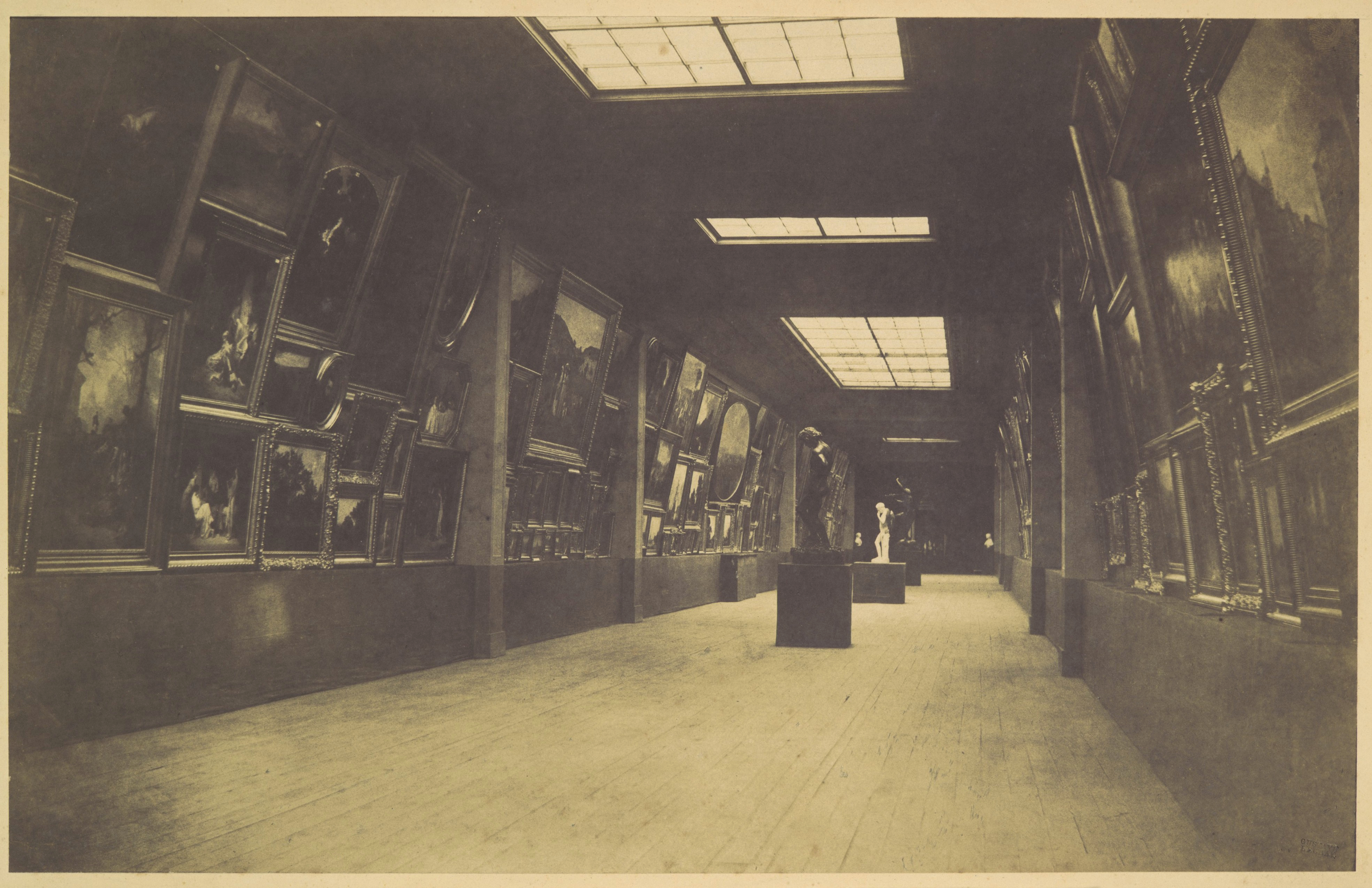
Photograph by Gustave Le Gray of the Salon of 1852

== See also ==
- Royal Academy Exhibition of 1852, held at the National Gallery in London

== Bibliography ==
- Eitner, Lorenz. French Paintings of the Nineteenth Century: Before Impressionism. National Gallery of Art, 2000.
- Harkett, Daniel & Hornstein, Katie (ed.) Horace Vernet and the Thresholds of Nineteenth-Century Visual Culture. Dartmouth College Press, 2017.
- Hellman, Karen. Real / Ideal: Photography in Mid-Nineteenth-Century France. Getty Publications, 2016.
