= Crimean–Circassian war (1539–1551) =

- Part of Crimean–Circassian wars
Date	1539–1551 (12 years)
Location	North Caucasus
Result	See § Results

Belligerents
Crimean Khanate; Ottoman Empire (Circassia) Pro–Crimean Circassians; Astrakhan Khanate (Pro–Crimean faction)	Circassia; Kabardia; Zhane; Bzhedug; Hatuqay; Astrakhan Khanate (Pro–Circassian faction); Cossacks

Commanders and leaders
(Crimean Khanate) Sahib I Giray X (Crimean Khanate) Emin Giray (Crimean Khanate) Ghazi Giray X (Crimean Khanate) Shah Hussein (Crimean Khanate) Bogdan Beg (Crimean Khanate) Ali Khoja (Crimean Khanate) Baba Beg (Crimean Khanate) Elbozdu; Khalil Bey Aq Kubek (surrendered)	(Circassia) Qanshawuq of Zhane (Circassia) Aledjuq Janbechqo (Circassia) Antonuq (POW) (Circassia) Prince Bzhedug Yamghurchi of Astrakhan

Strength
1539: 40,000; 1542: 20,000; 1545: 60,000–70,000; 1546–1550: 250,000 (Ottoman sources) 40,000–50,000 (modern sources); 1551: 20,000	1539: Unknown; 1542: 10,000–15,000 (likely exaggerated); 1545: 10,000; 1546–1550: Unknown; 1551: 15 under Prince Elok, total army unknown

Casualties and losses
Heavy	~90,000–100,000 enslaved (Ottoman claim, exaggerated): 10,000 Kabardians; 30,000–40,000 Hatuqay and Bzhedugs; 50,000+ Zhaneys

Sahib Giray’s campaigns to Circassia (1539–1551), also known as the Crimean–Circassian War of 1539–1551, were a series of large-scale military expeditions conducted by the Crimean Khanate under Sahib I Giray against various Circassian principalities in the North Caucasus. The campaigns aimed to reassert Crimean authority over Circassian territories, suppress resistance, and secure tribute, while also strengthening the khan’s position within the Crimean political system and in the eyes of the Ottoman Empire.

The expeditions resulted in widespread devastation among several Circassian principalities, including the Zhane, Bzhedugs, Kabardians, and Hatuqays, but failed to bring Circassia under lasting Crimean control. Despite reports of victory sent to Istanbul, continued Circassian resistance, ongoing raids, and internal opposition within the Crimean elite undermined Sahib Giray’s position. The aftermath of the campaigns coincided with Sahib Giray’s overthrow and assassination in 1551 and contributed to a shift in regional power dynamics, including the emergence of a Russo–Circassian alliance.

== Background ==
After the fall of the Golden Horde, the Crimean Khanate emerged as the most successful of the post-Golden Horde states. It survived for more than two centuries longer than the Kazan Khanate and the Astrakhan Khanate, and also took part in the destruction of the Great Horde and Astrakhan. Before recognizing Ottoman suzerainty in 1475, the Crimean khans pursued an independent policy, but even after becoming Ottoman vassals they skillfully used Ottoman political, military, and technological support to expand their influence in the northern Black Sea region and the North Caucasus. In 1475, the Ottomans captured a bridgehead on the Caucasian side of the Taman Peninsula Strait without the participation of Crimean forces. This was followed in 1479 by a large Ottoman expedition led by Gedik Ahmed Pasha, which deliberately invaded Circassia and devastated Anapa and Kopa. Between 1516 and 1519, the Ottomans, with the support of the Crimean army, constructed two major fortresses on the Shah’s Islands near Taman and Temryuk. After this, a long pause occurred in Ottoman–Crimean expansionist policy in Circassia.

In 1532, Sahib I Giray ascended the Crimean throne in Bakhchisarai. He became known for an active foreign policy based on close cooperation with the Ottoman Empire. Under his rule, the Crimean Khanate developed into a strong military power, equipped with field artillery and rifle units (tüfenkçi). Sahib Giray also created a personal guard of slaves modeled on the Ottoman Janissaries. His most notable military actions were his campaigns against Circassia, aimed at strengthening Crimean and Ottoman influence in the North Caucasus. These campaigns weakened the Circassian principalities and pushed them to seek support from the Muscovite state, marking a major shift in regional politics.

According to A. M. Nekrasov, the renewal of Ottoman expansion in the region was also connected to conflicts with Safavid Iran. In 1538, after a series of setbacks, the army of Tahmasp I captured Derbent for the first time, entering the Caspian North Caucasian plain and threatening Ottoman interests not only in Transcaucasia but also in the North Caucasus.

== Campaigns ==
=== Zhane–Elbrus campaign (1539) ===
In 946 AH (May–June 1539), the first expedition of Sahib I Giray into Circassia took place. Ottoman sources claim that the campaign was launched to punish Circassians who had raided Taman; however, it is possible that the real motive was to satisfy Ottoman and Crimean demand for slaves. According to Umdetü't Tevarih, the Circassians who attacked Taman were “Lower” Circassians allied with the Kabardians.

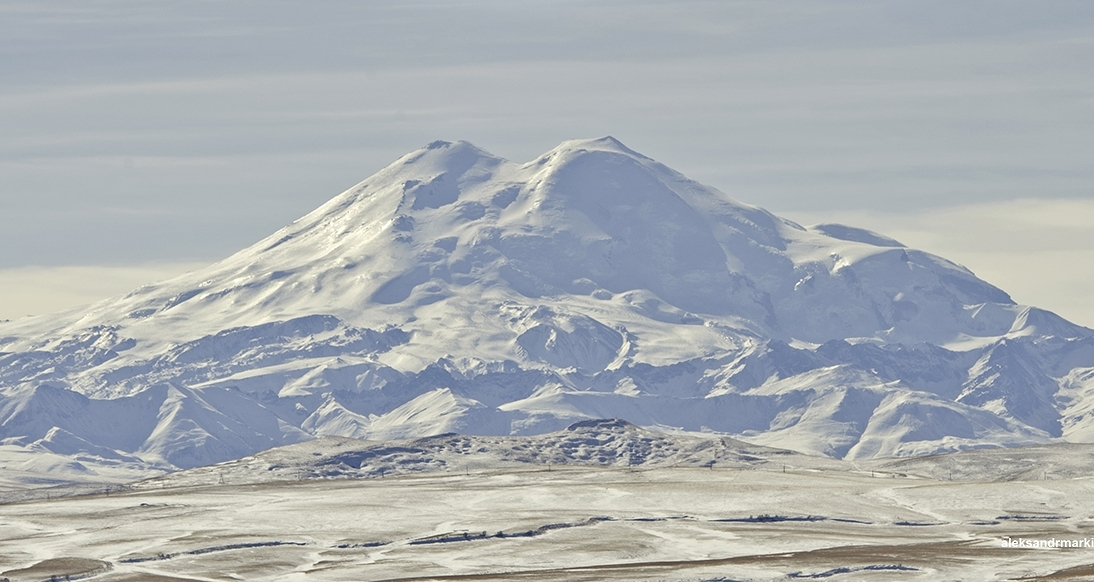
Mount Elbrus today

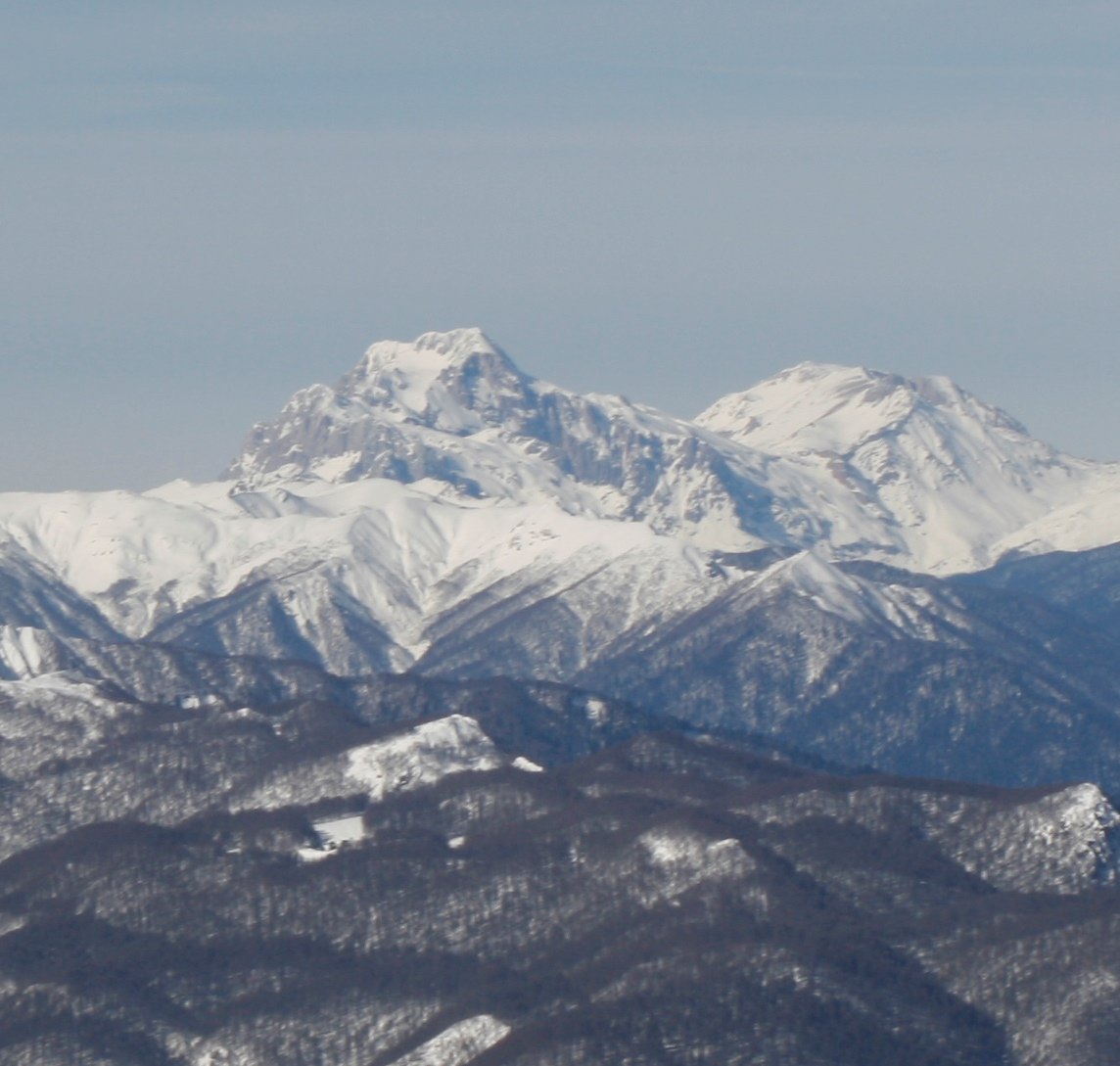
Mount Fisht in winter

The khan’s army was fully supported by the Ottomans and led by the Sanjakbeyi of the Kefe Eyalet, Khalil Bey, who provided a flotilla and personally accompanied the khan. The army sailed to the fortress of Temryuk, where several Circassian princes appealed to Sahib Giray and promised to hand over those responsible for the raid on Taman. Subsequently, hundreds of Circassians, including nobles, joined the rearguard of the Crimean army, which now numbered around 40,000 men, and marched toward Mount Tkhab. During the advance, the local prince of Zhane, Kansavuk, was captured by the khan, who held him responsible for failing to prevent the raid on Taman. Sahib Giray ordered Kansavuk to be executed with 10,000 lashes, but Circassians appealed to Khalil Bey for intervention. They promised 20 slaves to Khalil Bey, 100 to the Crimean khan, and 200 to the Ottoman sultan, resulting in Kansavuk’s pardon.

The khan then marched toward the foothills of Mount Elbrus, possibly reaching the area of Mount Fisht. In an unspecified Circassian region, the inhabitants began fleeing their villages, many of which were subsequently burned by the Crimean army. During this phase, a notorious robber was captured and interrogated by the khan. The captive informed Sahib Giray that Circassians had prepared defensive trenches with stakes along the banks of the Kuban River and offered to guide the army there. Owing to the difficult terrain and the lack of local knowledge among Circassians serving in the khan’s forces, Sahib Giray accepted the offer.

The khan selected 10,000 of his best troops and marched toward the village of Orgun. According to V. Ostapchuk, Orgun was likely located in the upper Kuban region, while S. Kh. Khotko places it near the Guzeripl Pass and identifies its population as Ubykhs. Baba Beg, bey of the Shirin tribe, was left behind to guard the camp.

The guide deliberately led the army into extremely difficult terrain. Exhausted and unable to force a decisive engagement, the khan was compelled to retreat. Enraged, Sahib Giray personally executed the guide by beheading him. During the withdrawal, large numbers of prisoners were taken; the khan refused any share of the captives for himself, leaving all spoils to his men. Only Circassians who converted to Islam were spared. Despite this, the campaign ended without a decisive battle and produced inconclusive results.

=== Zhane campaign (1542) ===
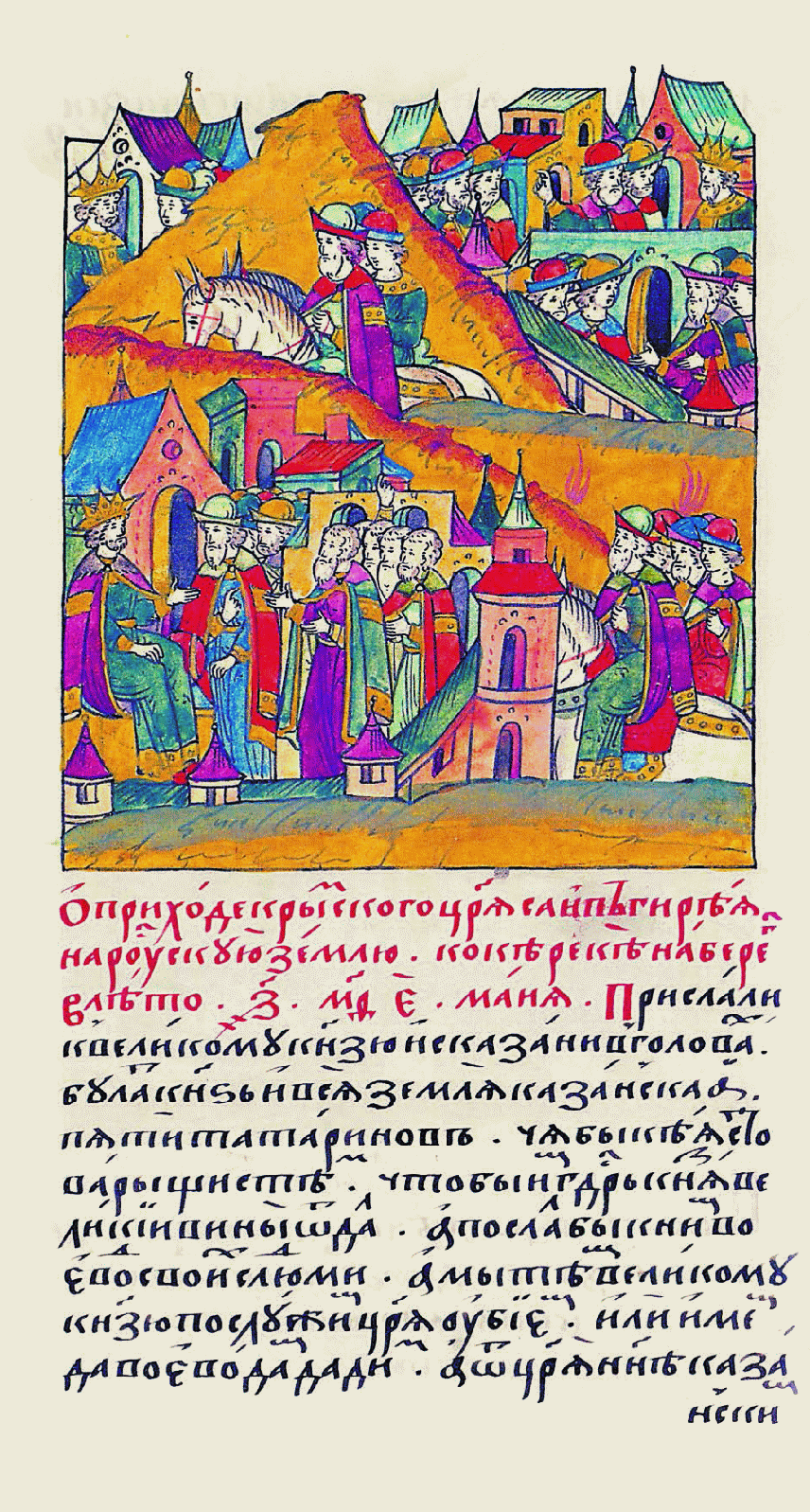
Sahib Giray in 1541. Illustration from Illustrated Chronicle of Ivan the Terrible

In 1542, Sahib Giray launched another campaign against the Circassian tribe of Zhane. Like the 1539 expedition, this campaign was conducted on the order of Sultan Suleiman the Magnificent and was supported by Khalil Bey, sanjakbey of Kefe. The immediate causes of the campaign were Zhane raids on Taman and the refusal of the Zhane prince Kansavuk to pay tribute.

The Ottoman–Crimean army reportedly numbered around 20,000 men. Upon learning of the khan’s approach, the Circassians divided their forces into detachments and fortified themselves behind defensive ditches. Their army is said to have numbered between 10,000 and 15,000 men, a figure likely exaggerated. Accompanied by a fleet of approximately 300 ships, the army advanced toward Temryuk. In an attempt to intimidate the Circassians, Sahib Giray ordered a demonstration of force, firing 30 cannons and around 3,000 rifle shots. Ottoman historian Remmal Khodja described the event as follows:

“The earth trembled so violently, as if Mount Elbrus were shaking. [The residents] of the remote areas of Zhane, hearing the volleys of arquebuses and cannons, did not know where to hide or what to do. And so Kansavuk heard this [the thunder of cannons]. [The khan was] three days’ journey away, and he lost his head and his complexion changed from horror, his soul was torn.”

Fearing direct confrontation, Kansavuk attempted to avert the campaign by offering 500 slaves to the Crimean khan and 1,000 to the Ottoman sultan. The attempt failed: Sahib Giray ordered the envoys to be stripped and flogged with 3,000 lashes, while two of them had their ears and noses cut off before being sent back to Kansavuk. Upon their return, Kansavuk was publicly denounced by his followers as incompetent, and widespread desertion followed, leaving him with only around 2,000 men. Despite this collapse, a group of Zhanes launched a night attack on the khan’s camp. The attackers were defeated, encircled, and either killed or captured. The prisoners were brought before Sahib Giray and informed him of Kansavuk’s abandonment by his forces. The khan rewarded those who captured them and continued his advance toward Kansavuk’s position.

The following morning, the Crimean forces discovered a defensive ditch and maneuvered around it, surrounding the Circassians from the rear and driving them toward the mountains. According to contemporary accounts, the Circassian forces were destroyed in less than an hour, with Kansavuk escaping with only one or two companions. After the battle, Tatar forces ravaged Zhane lands for 75 days, capturing approximately 50,000 civilians and around 100 murzas. The captured murzas were later exchanged for slaves.

=== Campaign to Kabardia (1545) ===
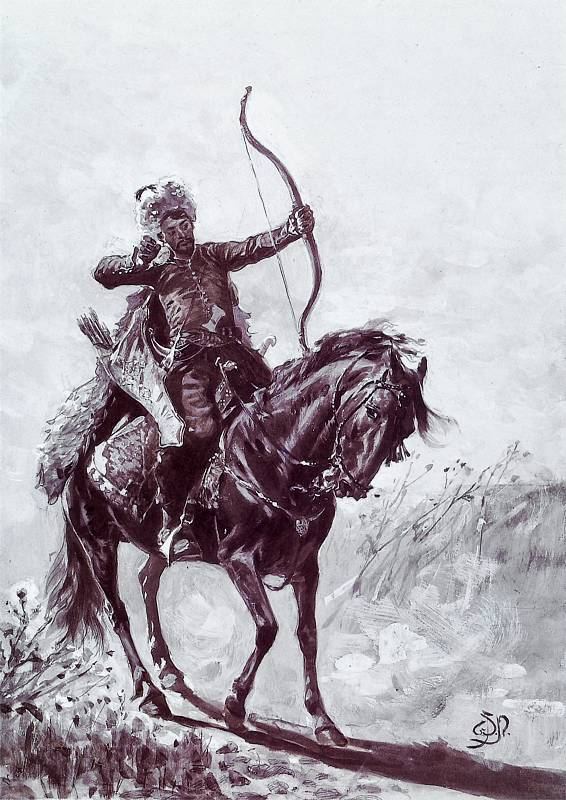
Crimean Tatar archer

In 1545 Tatars this time led a campaign to Kabardia (eastern Circassia). The reason for the campaign was Circassian prince Elbozdu, who was defeated in a power struggle with his unnamed cousin and fled to Crimea, asking the khan for help. Elbozdu also informed the khan that Kansavuk had fled to Kabardia with 100–200 people and was planning on capturing Azov. Another reason for the campaign may have been that the Circassians had captured Astrakhan and placed Akkubek on the Astrakhan throne for the second time shortly before the campaign.

During the campaign, the Kabardians were supported by the Bzhedugs, one of the most militant tribes of the Caucasus who reportedly mobilized an army of 10,000 against the khan. Thus, the khan marched to Kabardia in the autumn of 1545. The khan's army advanced through Perekop and Azov and, after three days of marching, settled near a "large river". After a short time, the khan continued his march for five more days and arrived in Kabardia. There, the khan summoned his son Emin Giray Sultan and entrusted him with the command of the plunder, while ordering that the soldiers not be allowed to disperse and to be careful at night. Elbozdu was appointed as the guide of the army. The khan's army approached the Malka River at a time when a sufficient number of Kabardian reapers and their guards had not yet gathered. The Tatars slaughtered the reapers; among the casualties were 40–50 beys. Bzhedug scouts climbed a high mountain and observed that the khan commanded an army of 60,000–70,000 men. After consultations, the Circassian princes decided to exchange the captured beys for slaves and prepare a night attack against the khan. When the envoy arrived, the khan accepted their request and gave them time to deliver the slaves. However, Elbozdu—suspected by the Circassians—warned the khan that an attack might occur at night. As a result, the khan marched further and stationed his army on the banks of the Belkh River. There, the khan pitched his tent on a high hill. In the distance, soldiers spotted Circassian forces, and when evening fell, the khan ordered the tent to be taken down and trenches to be dug. He ordered his troops to stand ready. The Tatar warriors formed a circle around their horses; each prepared his rifle, ammunition, quiver, and sword. Later, the Circassians arrived, planning first to capture the khan, believing this would cause the Tatar army to flee. Shouting together, ten thousand Circassians—waving bayonets and abandoning their horses—entered the Tatar camp, but fell into the trenches. Those at the front collapsed, and the Tatars began shooting at them. Despite attempts to escape, none survived, while the remaining Circassians fled. According to Ottoman sources, not a single Tatar was killed or wounded in the battle.

After the battle, the khan ordered public executions of the captured Circassian beys: some were beheaded, others impaled, some hanged by the neck, and others by the arms or legs. During the campaign to Kabardia, Sahib I Giray reportedly enslaved 10,000 people, a figure likely exaggerated, as was common in contemporary chronicles.

=== Astrakhan Conflict (1546–1550) ===
Map of Astrakhan Khanate and Astrakhan (Xacitarxan)

In 1546, Circassians, who had already grown disappointed in Aq Kubek, captured Astrakhan once again and placed the captive Yamghurchi Khan on the throne. The Nogai prince Belek-Bulat reported this event to Moscow as follows:

Yamghurchi, like Akkubek in his time, became a relative of the Circassians; they established brotherhood with him, took his yurt, and granted him good deeds.

Sahib I Giray was deeply angered by these events. His reports to Constantinople were discredited, and the Circassians no longer regarded him as a strong ruler. As a result, Sahib Giray decided to organize a campaign against Astrakhan and ordered a general mobilization, forcing every male between the ages of 15 and 70 to join the army, threatening execution for those who refused. According to Remmal Khodja, Sahib Giray’s army reached an unprecedented number of 250,000 men. Modern scholars consider this figure exaggerated, with estimates ranging between 40,000 and 50,000 warriors; nevertheless, Ottoman chroniclers emphasized that the Crimean Khanate had never before assembled such a large force.

After five days of marching, Sahib Giray reached Astrakhan, whose population was unaware of the approaching danger. At dawn, the Crimean army surrounded the city, fired a cannon volley and discharged a thousand muskets, after which the city was stormed. According to the sources, the Crimeans fired up to 20,000 arrows at its defenders. Khan Yamghurchi offered no resistance and fled the city, which was quickly captured. Sahib Giray then began deporting the Nogais of Astrakhan to the Crimean Peninsula; among those deported was Safa Giray, the ten-year-old son of the Khan of Kazan. As a result of the Crimean attack of 1546, Astrakhan was completely devastated—a blow from which the Astrakhan Khanate never fully recovered.

In 1548, Yamghurchi returned to the ruined capital with the assistance of Circassians and Nogais. However, at the end of 1549, Cossacks loyal to Moscow attacked Astrakhan, forcing Yamghurchi once again to seek refuge among the Circassians. Later that year, Circassians together with Cossacks raided Azov, further strengthening their cooperation. In 1550, with Circassian support, Yamghurchi once again seized the Astrakhan throne, expelling the pro-Crimean faction from the khanate. In 1553, a Moscow ambassador reported to the Grand Duke of Lithuania:

Three years have passed since the Cossacks took Astrakhan, our sovereign; and the Tsar of Astrakhan, Yamghurchi, left Astrakhan for Cherkasy, and from Cherkasy he sent a petition to our sovereign, asking that the sovereign grant him favor and seat him again in Astrakhan. And the sovereign granted him favor and seated him again in Astrakhan, and now the tsar of our sovereign's hand sits in Astrakhan and looks to our sovereign in everything.

=== Hatuqay Campaign (1551) ===
In 1551, another Crimean campaign against Circassia occurred. The campaign was triggered by attacks carried out by the Hatuqay princes Elok and Antanuk against Ottoman and Persian subjects near Azov. Like the previous expeditions, this campaign was organized by order of Sultan Suleiman I. As in the case of the Zhane prince Kansavuk, the Hatuqay princes adopted a defensive strategy, retreating with their forces into the mountains. The Hatuqays were supported by the Bzhedugs under their prince Buzhaduk, who encouraged resistance and sided with them. After a four-day march, Sahib Giray’s army, numbering about 20,000 men, arrived in the Principality of Hatuqay. Realizing that his approach had not intimidated the Circassians, the khan took with him 1,000 tüfenkçi riflemen, 20 cannons, and his son Ghazi Giray, while ordering a detachment of 2,000–3,000 men under Borgan Bey and Shah Hussein to advance on Elok’s village and capture him. They marched on his settlement and besieged it at dawn. Elok, seeing what was happening, ordered the fourteen men with him to prepare for battle. They immediately saddled their horses, donned armor, girded themselves with sabers, took daggers in hand, and left the house. Shah Hussein ordered his men to attack them, but Borgan Bey refused, claiming that the khan would be displeased. Before their argument could be resolved, Elok and his men managed to flee the area. In the morning, the khan arrived to inspect his troops and was informed of Elok’s escape. Enraged, Sahib Giray ordered Borgan Bey and Shah Hussein to be brought before him. Upon their arrival, he ordered their beards and mustaches to be plucked out; their faces were smeared with mud, and their necks were wrapped in intestines mixed with filth.

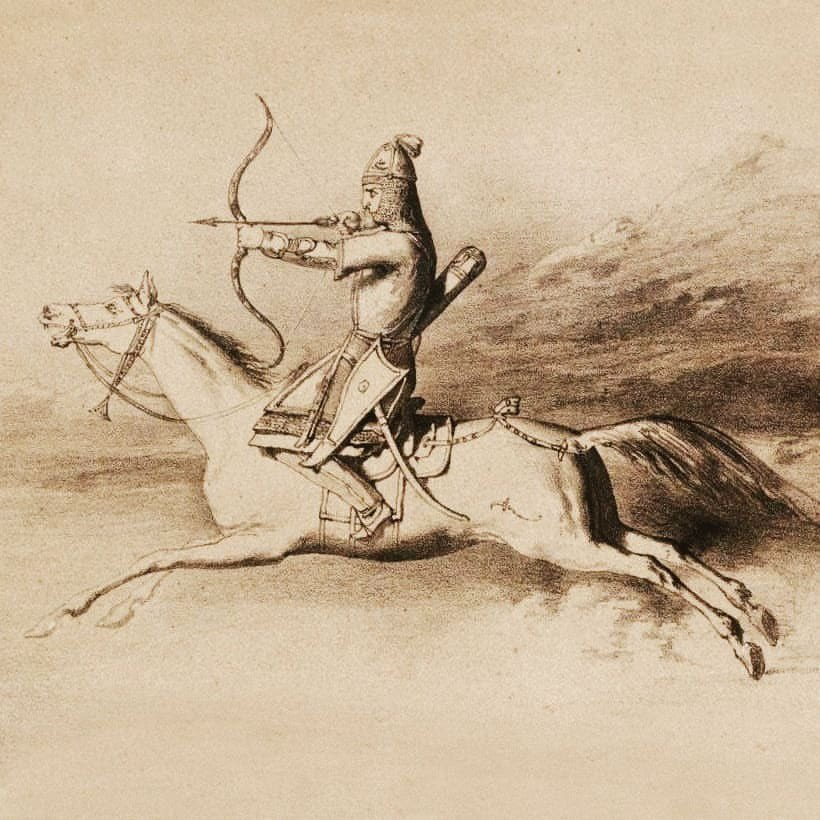
Circassian prince on horseback. Drawing by Jean-Baptiste Jules Trayer

The next day, the khan marched to a “very large” river, where he established a fortified camp. According to Remmal Khodja, the camp was so strong that even an army of 100,000 men would not have been able to take it. Sahib Giray left a garrison of 200 tüfenkçi under Ali Khoja and then marched toward Mount Elbrus together with his son Ghazi Giray. After a three-day journey, they reached the area at the foot of Elbrus on the fourth day, where Prince Buzhaduk and other Bzhedug princes resided. The Crimean forces opened fire with cannons and advanced while shouting “Allah! Allah!” Panic spread among the Circassian princes, who abandoned the area and fled. After capturing the settlement, the Tatars seized rich booty, including fine fabrics, gold and silver tableware, and reportedly between 30,000 and 40,000 yasyrs. Among the captives was Antanuk, the brother of Elok. The ultimate fate of the captured princes remains unclear, but the khan ordered exemplary executions of the captives.

== Aftermath ==
Despite his successful campaigns against Circassian tribes, Sahib Giray was overthrown by Devlet I Giray and was assassinated by his own army while returning from the campaign, before he was able to return to the Crimean peninsula. Devlet Giray, having arrived at Perekop, found an army of 20,000 under the khan’s sons, Emin Giray and Adil Giray, preparing to block him. Realizing that reaching Crimea by land would be impossible, Devlet Giray marched to Crimea by sea and captured Bakhchisaray, where he was appointed as the new khan. They also captured the children and wives of Sahib Giray, to whom no one came to the rescue. Sahib Giray’s inner circle suggested that he march through Azov to Perekop, hoping that the people, upon learning of his return, would support the khan. However, in the morning he was abandoned by his entire army and fled to the Taman Peninsula together with his son Ghazi Giray. At this time, Bulyuk Giray arrived in Taman with 400–500 warriors and killed the khan together with his son.

=== Results ===
Sahib Giray’s campaigns against the Circassians were the biggest and most devastating campaigns the Tatars ever prepared against Circassia, with no larger campaign being organized despite centuries of conflict. These campaigns dealt a heavy blow to many Circassian principalities; the Zhanes, Bzhedugs, Kabardians, and Hatuqays were all devastated and massacred. However, despite claims of victory reported to the Ottomans by Sahib Giray, the Circassians were not subdued. His reports of victories, followed by continued Circassian raids into Taman and Azov, failed to impress the Ottoman authorities in Istanbul, which may have been one of the reasons for his overthrow. Moreover, according to Samir Khotko, reports of victories over the Zhane and Bzhedugs as recorded by Remmal-khoja are questionable, as the significant foreign policy successes and ambitions of the Zhane princes in the 1550s and 1560s are well documented. These campaigns resulted not in the conquest of Circassia, but in the beginning of a Russo–Circassian alliance. According to Turkish historian Yücel Öztürk, the limited success of the campaigns was caused by the overthrow of Sahib Giray, as well as Russian expansion into Circassia after perceiving the region as depopulated, leading them to establish alliances with local rulers.

== Sources ==
- Khotko, Samir Khamidovich (2016). The campaigns of Sahib Giray I in Circassia in 1539–1551 according to Remmal Khoja (PDF) (in Russian).
- İnci, Abidin (2019). "16. Yüzyıl'da Osmanlı Devleti'nin Çerkesya ile İlişkileri ve Osmanlı-Çerkes Sınırı". Journal of Caucasian Studies (in Turkish). 5 (9): 1–16. doi:10.21488/jocas.639945.
- Shalak, Maxim (2021). Historical and Geographical Analysis of the Chronicle of Remmal Khoja "Tarikh-i Sahib Giray Khan" (in Russian). Institute of History and International Relations, Southern Federal University.
- Yasar, Murat (13 June 2022). The North Caucasus Borderland. Edinburgh University Press. ISBN 978-1-4744-9871-5.
- Khotko, Samir (2008). Civilization of Kabarda (in Russian). Saint Petersburg University Press.
