= Crimean campaign in Hatuqay =

Campaign of the Crimean khan Sahib Giray against Circassians

Crimean Campaign against Hatuqay (1551)
- Part of Sahib Giray's campaign to Circassia
Date	1551
Location	Hatuqay, Kuban
Result	See § Aftermath: Crimean annexation attempt of Hatuqay fails, Crimeans retreat from Circassia, Crimean Khan assassinated and replaced; Hatuqay villages burnt and massacred, inhabitants enslaved; Circassian principalities either began entering alliances with Russia or convert to Islam to avoid future crimean raids

Belligerents
Crimean Khanate	Principality of Hatuqay; Principality of Bzhedug

Commanders and leaders
Sahib I Giray X Borgan Beg; Shah Hussein	Aledjuq Janbechqo; Antonuq Janbechqo (executed); Bzhedug

Strength
Total troops in campaign: ~20,000 troops 1,000 musketeers 20 cannons During the siege: 2,000 troops	Total troops in campaign: Unknown During the siege: 15 Hatuqays

Casualties and losses
Unknown, low per Crimean sources (at least 17 Janissaries killed)	Unknown, thousands of civilians captured or killed per Crimean sources

The Crimean Campaign against Hatuqay (1551) was led by the Crimean Khan Sahib I Giray against the Principality of Hatuqay led by Prince Aledjuq. The campaign was triggered by the Hatuqay refusal to pay slaves tax to the Crimean Khanate, and the goal was the annexation of Hatuqay; which failed, although Hatuqay lands were ravaged. It proved to be Sahib-Giray's final military endeavour, as he was killed.

== History ==
=== Campaign ===
As a successor state to the Golden Horde, the Crimean Khanate claimed sovereignty over the Circassia. This political relationship was characterized primarily by the obligation of Circassian princes to pay tribute to the Crimean Khan, predominantly in the form of slaves. This tribute was demanded upon the ascension of a new Khan to the throne or levied as fines for crimes committed by Circassian subjects. When Circassian leaders refused to deliver the required number of captives, the Crimean leadership launched punitive military expeditions to enforce payment. These raids were justified by labelling the Circassians as "infidels". This justification became complicated from the 16th century onward as the Circassians increasingly converted to Islam; however Crimean Khans often ignored these conversions and rejected negotiations with Circassian envoys who pleaded over their shared religion.

Despite the presence of Islam, there was debate over whether the region is Dar al-Harb (the Abode of War), where slaves could be taken, or Dar al-Islam (the Abode of Islam), which would prevent enslavement. Despite some legal rulings (kanunname) suggesting Sharia should apply to certain tribes (which would protect them), the Ottoman state supported the Crimean Khan in enslaving Circassians, treating the region effectively as a source of slaves regardless of religious affiliation. It was not possible to determine whether the Circassians entering the Ottoman market were from Dar al-Harb or not, as both allied Muslim Circassians and non-Muslim Circassians were raided by the Khanate. The Circassians were described as "neither Christians nor Muslims" by a courtier of the Crimean Khan. Some Ottoman chroniclers mention that the Circassians fought against the Crimean Khanate because they could not stand the "Tatar tyranny and oppression" (Turkish: zülm ü cevre). In some cases, the Circassians pleaded with the Ottoman sultan directly, arguing that they were fellow Muslims; thus it was therefore "against the sharia to turn them into slaves". The Sultan withdrew permission for the Khan's campaigns based on this argument, although the Khan proceeded regardless.

The Hatuqay maintained control over fertile lowlands and crucial trade routes in the northwestern Caucasus, resisting both Tatar incursions and pressure. Tensions escalated throughout the 1540s as the Hatuqay leadership increasingly resisted demands for tribute and subordination. According to the Crimean Chronicle "Tārih̲-i Ṣāḥib Giray H̲ān", the events were as follows:

The Hatuqay princes Aledjuq and his brother Antenuq were involved in acts against the Crimean Khanate. Aledjuq is quoted as saying: (Note: ḫān bizi ġāret etmege varurın dėrmiş, / biz (19) Jane (20) ve Kabartay gibi / degülüz (21). Ol ṭopla / żarbzenine ṭayanub germ olur- muş (22), amma benim / ṭob ve tüfengim (23) sarp / ṭaġlar ve (24) aġırmaḳ atlardur. Ol / 'araba (25) ile ne / iş ėderüm der ola (26). Ḥānıñ ne cānı vardur ki benüm / üzerime (27) gele. Eger gelürse aña bir iş / ėderim (28) ki 'ālemde destān ola)

The Khan, they say, is coming to plunder us, but we are not like the Zhaney and Kabardians. He is strong because of his cannons and artillery, but our cannons and muskets are the steep mountains and neighing horses. What could I possibly do with those cannon carts? What strength does the Khan have that he would come against me? If he comes, I will do such a thing to him that it shall become a legend in the world!

— Alejuq

Crimean Khan Sahib I Giray organized a punitive expedition in 1551, aiming to break Hatuqay resistance and assert Crimean authority in the region. A Tatar chronicle claims this was because the Circassians, led by Aledjuq, raided a Crimean caravan near Azov in 1551; however, the Ottoman Sultan had already sanctioned a raid prior to that. The Khan set out on the path, exclaiming "where are you, sons of Hatuqay!" (Note: ḳandesün / Ḥanṭuḳ Oġılları !) The Hatuqay princes, upon hearing of the Khan approaching to plunder, led their population to hide deep into the mountains. They also forged an alliance with the Bzhedugs under their prince Bzhedug (the founder of Bzhedug tribe and the father of Cherchan and Khamish), who encouraged resistance and sided with them. Aledjuq and Bzhedug spent five days feasting. The Khan sent his commanders Shah Hussein and Borgan Beg with 2 thousand soldiers to kill Aledjuq in his sleep and capture his village; guided by a captive Circassian, they went to his village, but he woke up to a horse's neigh and bolted off his house with his closest men. Shah Hussein urged Borgan Beg to attack, shouting, "What are you waiting for? Come, let's surround them and fight!" but Borgan Beg said, "Could any man possibly face them?", and allowed Aledjuq and his 15 men to escape without a fight. The Khan, upon hearing of this, was enraged: (Note: «Bre yaman ḳaltaḳlar ! Ben sizi ilerü çėküb adam ėtdim. Benim devletimde, bunca māl ıssı olub, kişi / şa- dedine girdiniz. Sizi adam dėyü çeri başı ėdüb, / iki üç biñ adamla gönderdim. On bėş / nefer kişiye muḳabele / olmayub, ḳaçurasız hemi !»)

You egregious bitches, I indulged you, I made men out of you. Under my rule, you became rich and respected. Thinking you are men, I made you commanders and sent you at the head of two or three thousand men. You could not even stop 15 men, and you let them escape. Is that so?!

— Sahib Giray

The Khan had the commanders humiliated and tortured. Following Aledjuq's escape, the Khan established a heavily fortified camp surrounded by trenches and stakes near a large, impassable river. He then pursued the Hatuqays and their Bzhedug allies deeper into the mountains, eventually ambushing them at the site where they were dividing the stolen goods from the pilgrims. The Hatuqay forces, though outnumbered, leveraged their knowledge of the landscape to conduct guerrilla-style warfare, harassing the advancing Crimean army and inflicting significant losses. The battle itself was marked by a series of skirmishes and ambushes, with neither side achieving a decisive victory in the initial stages. The Hatuqay were eventually overwhelmed by the superior numbers and resources of the Crimean forces. Antenuq was captured and tortured to death with hot iron. The Khan's army advanced further into the region, capturing key settlements and strongholds. 30 to 40 thousand slaves were taken (number claimed by the chronicle), the Hatuqay population was captured and "tortured en masse", and Aledjuq's village was burnt to the ground.

Despite claims of victory reported to the Ottomans by Sahib Giray, the Hwere not subdued. While the Khan was engaged in his campaign against the Hatuqays, his nephew, Devlet Giray, successfully seized the khanate's throne in Crimea. This usurpation was sanctioned by the Ottoman Sultan, and Sahib Giray's entire government and army defected to the new ruler without any resistance. Forced to flee, the deposed Khan sought refuge in the fortress of Temryuk, but envoys sent by Devlet Giray swiftly arrived and hacked both him and his son to death. The usurpation was followed by a ruthless purge in Crimea, where all of Sahib Giray's remaining sons, including his youngest children, were summarily executed.

== Aftermath ==
=== Result ===
Despite the mass devastation of lands of the Hatuqays, the Crimean forces eventually retreated after not being able to break the Circassian resistance, and left without establishing full influence over the region. Thus, the Crimeans left the Circassian lands with no full success. The main aim of Sahib Giray during these campaigns was to fully annex and occupy the lands of Circassia, which he failed to do so, being assassinated in 1551 right after this campaign.

=== Reaction of other Circassian states ===
Sahib-Giray's 1551 campaign against the Hatuqay and Bzhedugs drew strong reaction from the Kabardians and other Circassian tribes, who attempted to seek a powerful external ally against Crimean raids and entered diplomatic meetings with Russia. The Khan had inflicted severe blows on almost all major principalities of Circassia: Zhaney, Hatuqay, Bzhedug, Kabardia. It is after this that the Circassians started to seek alliances with Russia to fight against Tatar incursions. The next khan also attacked Circassia the year after Sahib Giray's death, however, a few years later the Circassians under Prince Temruqo the Brave defeated the Crimeans.
