= The Human Comedy =

The Human Comedy may refer to:

- The Human Comedy, or La Comédie humaine, an 1829–1848 collection of interrelated novels and stories by Honoré de Balzac
- Human Comedy, an 1852 painting by Kean-Louis Hamon
- The Human Comedy (novel), a 1943 novel
- The Human Comedy (film), a 1943 film
- The Human Comedy (musical), a 1983 musical
- The Decameron

== See also ==
- La Comédie humaine (film), a 2010 Hong Kong film
- Lost Illusions (2021 film), whose working title was Comédie humaine
