= The Harvest (Daubigny) =

Painting by Charles-François Daubigny

- La récolte (French)
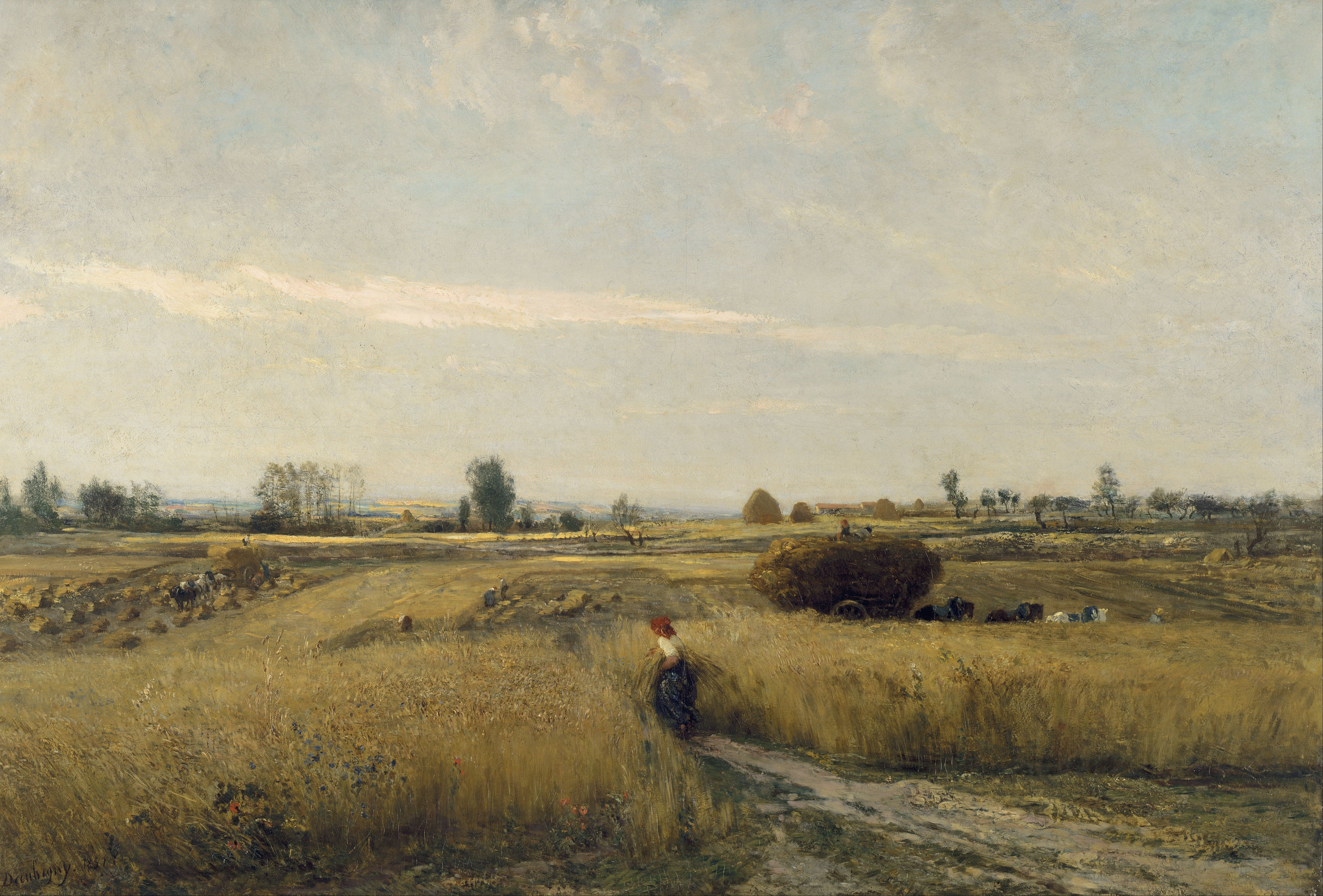
- Artist: Charles-François Daubigny
- Year: 1851
- Medium: Oil on canvas
- Dimensions: 196 cm × 135 cm (77 in × 53 in)
- Location: Musée d'Orsay, Paris

The Harvest (French: la récolte) is an oil on canvas painting by French artist Charles-François Daubigny. It was completed in 1851 and is housed at Musée d'Orsay, Paris.

== Description ==
Although the work cannot have been painted in the open air owing to its large dimensions, Daubigny certainly tried to capture the fleeting reality of a summer day in the country. The work stands out for its light colors and loose brushstrokes. Many other painters of the Barbizon School used a much darker palette. Daubigny showed himself to be a forerunner of the Impressionists. This is especially evident around the horizon, where only a few horizontally placed brushstrokes, each of a different color, can be seen.

In this painting, the whole countryside is marked out in blue squares that seems like a chessboard. All of the activities are picturesquely grouped around a golden blaze such as men doubled over, women hurrying along the narrow paths, and people stooking sheaves of corn and loading carts.

== Reception ==
The painting was exhibited at the Paris Salon of 1852. The work was very successful and marked a breakthrough in the painter's career. The brothers Edmond and Jules de Goncourt devoted a long review in high praise of the work: "Men harvest bent and women hurry along the narrow paths and sheaves are tied and wagons loaded. All these activities come together picturesquely in a golden glow, in which a brush without paint makes a plow furrow sparkle here and there (...). The grain harvest has never been better depicted; (...) and Mr Daubigny's painting is a masterpiece, despite the neglect of the background."

== Provenance ==
Daubigny made the painting at the behest of the French Minister of the Interior for 2,500 francs. In 1853, the French state bought the work. It hung in the Ministry of Justice until 1907, when it was transferred to the Louvre, in Paris. In 1986, it was moved to the Musée d'Orsay, where it still hangs.
