= Arab Chiefs Challenging each other to Single Combat under the Ramparts of a City =

Painting by Théodore Chassériau

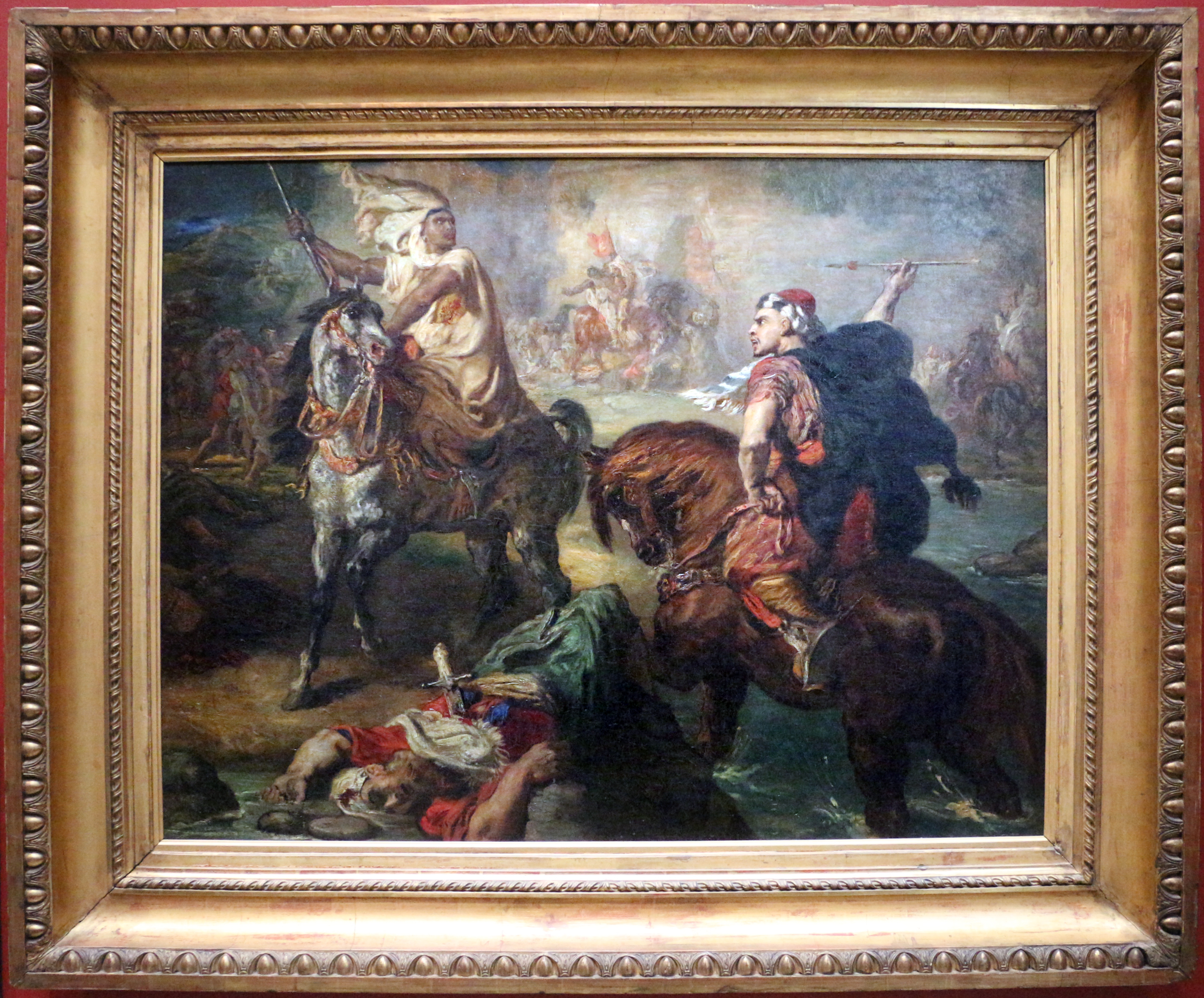
Arab Chiefs Challenging each other to Single Combat under the Ramparts of a City (1852) by Théodore Chassériau

Arab Chiefs Challenging each other to Single Combat under the Ramparts of a City (French: Chefs de tribus arabes se défiant au combat singulier, sous les remparts d'une ville) is an oil painting on canvas executed in 1852 by the French painter Théodore Chassériau. It was one of three works by Chassériau accepted for the Salon of 1852 (the others were Le Christ chez Martha et Marie and Desdemona). It is held at the Musée d'Orsay, in Paris.

== Subject ==
Chassériau travelled to Algeria, and in 1846 spent nearly a month in Constantine sketching and drawing studies. These would be used in his future works that dealt with orientalist subjects. While not very interested in landscapes, he was fascinated by colours and costumes.

In 19th-century orientalist art, the standard image of the Eastern woman was as a nonchalant odalisque of the harem, while that of the man was as a proud, courageous but cruel warrior. In this context, the chiefs depicted in this work may be seen as the stereotypical counterparts of the women who appear in another painting by Chassériau at the Musée d'Orsay: Tepidarium.

The hatred and violence of the challenge can be seen in the way the two warriors look at each other. The fact that the horse of one stands on dry ground while the other stands in water seems only to emphasise their implacable opposition. On the ground before them lies a body, a bloody dagger in his chest, while behind them fighting continues.

The work certainly shows the influence of Delacroix, but also recalls Renaissance and Baroque figuration, particularly in the way the Algerian riders are represented as classical heroes. In his use of colour however Chassériau was unlike the painters of earlier periods, using a very limited palette. Combining careful sketches figures with pure fantasy, the work seeks to capture the spirit of revolt against European incursions. By presenting the Arab chiefs as classical heroes, gesturing theatrically, Chassériau offered the viewer an idealised representation of their contemporary resistance.

== History ==
Chassériau painted a number of battle scenes, including Arab horsemen carrying off their dead after an encounter with the spahis (Les cavaliers arabes emportant leurs morts après une affaire avec les spahis), presented with seven other canvases at the Salon of 1851 He followed this up in 1852 by Arab Chiefs Challenging each other to Single Combat under the Ramparts of a City. The two paintings were exhibited together at the Exposition Universelle in 1855.

The painting has been exhibited many times both in France and internationally.

- 1852 - exhibited at the Paris Salon
- 1855 - Exposition Universelle, Paris
- 1917 - acquired by the Louvre from the estate of Mme Gras
- 1930 - Centenaire de l'Algérie - Algiers
- 1931 - Exposition coloniale internationale - bois de Vincennes, Paris
- 1932 - Art colonial, Vienna
- 1933 - Chassériau 1819-1856 - musée de l'Orangerie, Paris
- 1956 - Od Davida do Cezanne'a, Warsaw
- 1956 - Peinture française du XIXe siècle, Moscow, St. Petersburg
- 1959 - The Romantic Movement, Tate Gallery, London
- 1965 - Un século de pintura francesa 1850-1950, Calouste Gulbenkian Foundation, Lisbon
- 1975 - L'Orientalisme en question 1825-1875 - De Missolonghi à Suez ou l'Orientalisme de Delacroix à Flaubert, Musée Cantini, Marseille
- 1982 - Od Courbeta k Cezannovi, Kinský Palace, Prague
- 1982-3 - Von Courbet bis Cezanne - Fränzosische malerei 1848-1886 - Nationalgalerie, Staatliche Museen zu Berlin
- 1986 - transferred from the Louvre to the Musée d’Orsay
- 2002 - Chassériau, un autre romantisme. 1819-1856, Galeries nationales du Grand Palais, Paris

== Critical reception ==
When his work was first exhibited, Chassériau was considered a "pasticheur" of the style of Eugène Delacroix. However when the painting was exhibited again at the Universal Exhibition of 1855, the critics' opinion was different. In 1852 Théophile Gautier wrote that the painting contained "convulsive gestures, missing horizons [and] heavy, twisted draperies." However having judged in 1852 that the work was more of a "draft rather than a painting", he then considered that the composition tapped into "the very heart of Arab mores, combining a very beautiful style with the most exact local color".

Reviewing the painting, the Revue de Paris considered Chassériau's style too clear-cut and too disquieting to be easily accepted; and said his eccentricity upset conventional tastes. It noted that people admired the artist's talents and his spirit, but rarely discussed his works.

== See also ==
- The Combat of the Giaour and Hassan
