= The Harbor of La Rochelle =

Painting by Jean-Baptiste-Camille Corot

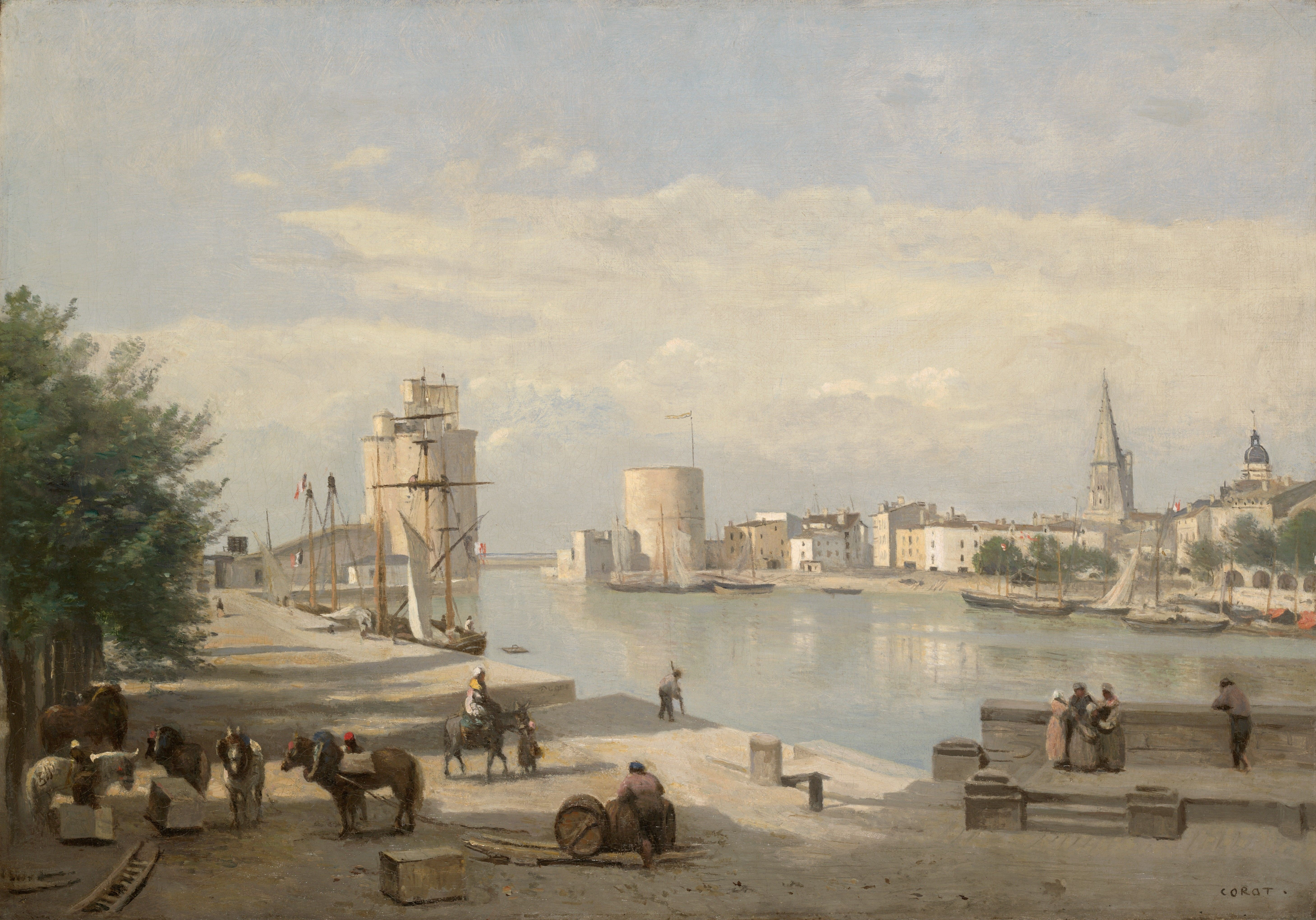
- Artist: Jean-Baptiste-Camille Corot
- Year: 1851
- Medium: Oil on canvas
- Dimensions: 50.5 cm × 71.8 cm (19.9 in × 28.3 in)
- Location: Yale University Art Gallery, New Haven

The Harbor of La Rochelle is an oil-on-canvas painting by French artist Jean-Baptiste-Camille Corot, created in 1851. It is held at the Yale University Art Gallery, in New Haven.

== History and description ==
In a horizontal format, this canvas is a seascape depicting the Old Port of La Rochelle, on the Bay of Biscay, in Charente-Maritime. Centered on The Chain Tower, the composition is dominated by the Saint Nicolas Tower and the Lantern Tower, with the foreground on the left showing horses on the quays.

Although Corot was producing his renowned grey landscapes by 1851, this painting recalls his earlier style. It is notable for being a finished study that Corot chose to exhibit at the Paris Salon of 1852, as he usually preferred to exhibit compositions of religious or literary subjects.

The work was purchased from the artist by Alfred Robaut in 1868. It later entered the collection of Constant Dutilleux, before being shown again at the Universal Exhibition of 1889 in Paris. Bequeathed by Stephen Carlton Clark in 1903, the painting has been held at the Yale University Art Gallery, since 1961.
