= Aledjuq of Hatuqay =

16th-century Circassian prince of the Hatuqay principality

Aledjuq
- Джанбэч ыкъо Алэджыкъу

Prince of Hatuqay
- In office 16th century

Personal details
- Parent: Janbech (father)
- Relatives: Antenuq (brother)

Military service
- Allegiance: Principality of Hatuqay; Ottoman Empire (1578–1590)
- Battles/wars: Bzhedug-Chemguy war; Crimean–Circassian war (1539–1551); Crimean campaign in Hatuqay; Ottoman–Safavid War (1578–1590); Siege of Derbent (1579)

Aledjuq, son of Janbech (Adyghe: Джанбэч ыкъо Алэджыкъу; known as Elyok son of Canbek in Turkish chronicles) was a 16th-century Circassian prince and military leader of the Principality of Hatuqay. Led by him, the Hatuqay resisted the Crimean Khanate during the 1550s. He also later participated in the Ottoman–Safavid War (1578–1590).

== Reign ==
=== Relations with other Circassians ===
Aledjuq ruled during a period of conflict between the Chemguys and the Bzhedugs. Aledjuq allied with the Chemguy prince Tumenish against the Bzhedugs. In the battle, Tumenish was killed, thus Aledjuq took command of the Hatuqay-Chemguy forces, rallying the confused troops to defeat the Bzhedugs.

=== Conflict with the Crimean Khanate ===
As a successor state to the Golden Horde, the Crimean Khanate claimed sovereignty over the Circassia. This political relationship was characterized primarily by the obligation of Circassian princes to pay tribute to the Crimean Khan, predominantly in the form of slaves. This tribute was demanded upon the ascension of a new Khan to the throne or levied as fines for crimes committed by Circassian subjects. When Circassian leaders refused to deliver the required number of captives, the Crimean leadership launched punitive military expeditions to enforce payment.

The Hatuqay maintained control over fertile lowlands and crucial trade routes in the northwestern Caucasus, resisting both Tatar incursions and pressure. Tensions escalated throughout the 1540s as the Hatuqay leadership increasingly resisted demands for tribute and subordination. According to the Crimean Chronicle "Tārih̲-i Ṣāḥib Giray H̲ān", the events were as follows:

The Hatuqay princes Aledjuq and his brother Antenuq were involved in acts against the Crimean Khanate. Aledjuq is quoted as saying: (Note: ḫān bizi ġāret etmege varurın dėrmiş, / biz (19) Jane (20) ve Kabartay gibi / degülüz (21). Ol ṭopla / żarbzenine ṭayanub germ olur- muş (22), amma benim / ṭob ve tüfengim (23) sarp / ṭaġlar ve (24) aġırmaḳ atlardur. Ol / 'araba (25) ile ne / iş ėderüm der ola (26). Ḥānıñ ne cānı vardur ki benüm / üzerime (27) gele. Eger gelürse aña bir iş / ėderim (28) ki 'ālemde destān ola)

The Khan, they say, is coming to plunder us, but we are not like the Zhaney and Kabardians. He is strong because of his cannons and artillery, but our cannons and muskets are the steep mountains and neighing horses. What could I possibly do with those cannon carts? What strength does the Khan have that he would come against me? If he comes, I will do such a thing to him that it shall become a legend in the world!

— Alejuq

Crimean Khan Sahib I Giray organized a punitive expedition in 1551, aiming to break Hatuqay resistance and assert Crimean authority in the region. A Tatar chronicle claims this was because the Circassians, led by Aledjuq, raided a Crimean caravan near Azov in 1551; however, the Ottoman Sultan had already sanctioned a raid. The Khan set out on the path, exclaiming "where are you, sons of Hatuqay!" (Note: ḳandesün / Ḥanṭuḳ Oġılları !)

The Hatuqay princes, upon hearing of the Khan approaching to plunder, led their population to hide deep into the mountains. They also forged an alliance with the Bzhedugs under their prince Buzhaduk (the founder of Bzhedug and the father of Cherchan and Khamish), who encouraged resistance and sided with them. Aledjuq and Buzhaduk spent five days feasting. The Khan sent his commanders to kill Aledjuq in his sleep; but he woke up to a horse's neigh and bolted off his house with his closest men. One Tatar commander suggested attacking, but the other said, "Could any man possibly face them?", and allowed Aledjuq and his 15 men to escape without a fight. The Khan, upon hearing of this, was enraged: (Note: «Bre yaman ḳaltaḳlar ! Ben sizi ilerü çėküb adam ėtdim. Benim devletimde, bunca māl ıssı olub, kişi / şa- dedine girdiniz. Sizi adam dėyü çeri başı ėdüb, / iki üç biñ adamla gönderdim. On bėş / nefer kişiye muḳabele / olmayub, ḳaçurasız hemi !»)

You egregious bitches, I indulged you, I made men out of you. Under my rule, you became rich and respected. Thinking you are men, I made you commanders and sent you at the head of two or three thousand men. You could not even stop 15 men, and you let them escape. Is that so?!

— Sahib Giray

The Khan had the commanders humiliated and tortured.

Following Aledjuq's escape, the Khan established a heavily fortified camp surrounded by trenches and stakes near a large, impassable river. He then pursued the Hatuqays and their Bzhedug allies deeper into the mountains, eventually ambushing them at the site where they were dividing the stolen goods from the pilgrims. The Hatuqay forces, though outnumbered, leveraged their knowledge of the landscape to conduct guerrilla-style warfare, harassing the advancing Crimean army and inflicting significant losses. The battle itself was marked by a series of skirmishes and ambushes, with neither side achieving a decisive victory in the initial stages. The Hatuqay were eventually overwhelmed by the superior numbers and resources of the Crimean forces. Antenuq was captured and tortured to death with hot iron. The Khan's army advanced further into the region, capturing key settlements and strongholds. 30 to 40 thousand slaves were taken, the Hatuqay population was tortured en masse, and Aledjuq's village was burnt to the ground.

The Khan had inflicted severe blows on almost all major principalities of Circassia: Zhaney, Hatuqay, Bzhedug, Kabardia. It is after this that the Circassians started to seek alliances with Russia to fight against Tatar incursions. However, despite claims of victory reported to the Ottomans by Sahib Giray, the Circassians were not subdued. While the Khan was engaged in his campaign against the Hatuqays, his nephew, Devlet Giray, successfully seized the khanate's throne in Crimea. This usurpation was sanctioned by the Ottoman Sultan, and Sahib Giray's entire government and army defected to the new ruler without any resistance. Forced to flee, the deposed Khan sought refuge in the fortress of Temryuk, but envoys sent by Devlet Giray swiftly arrived and hacked both him and his son to death. The usurpation was followed by a ruthless purge in Crimea, where all of Sahib Giray's remaining sons, including his youngest children, were summarily executed.

=== Later life ===
During the Ottoman–Safavid War (1578–1590), Aledjuq led the Hatuqay principality into the conflict on the side of the Ottoman Empire, fighting as an ally of their former enemies, the Crimean Khanate. Before the campaign, the Khan Mehmed II Giray, who was married to a Besleney Circassian noblewoman, consulted the Besleney prince Mejajuq Tutcheriy, who advised the Khan to not issue an order to the Circassians, instead he suggested the Khan simply let it be known that all Circassians, regardless of tribe or social rank, were free to join him. According to the Circassian advisor, only by making it voluntary would the Khan be able to gather a large force from among the Circassians.

== See also ==
- Principality of Hatuqay
- Sahib I Giray
- Circassia
