= Jean-Louis Hamon =

French painter (1821–1874)

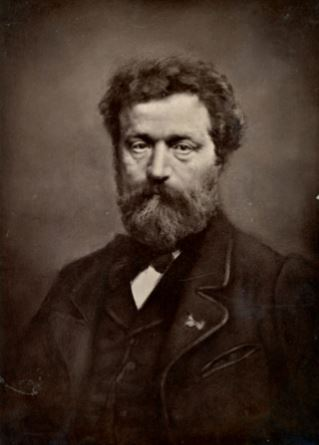

Jean-Louis Hamon (5 May 1821 – 29 May 1874) was a French painter whose career was centered on the Paris Salon and the international exhibitions of the mid-19th century. Born at Plouha in Brittany, he moved to Paris in 1840 and received advice and encouragement from Paul Delaroche and Charles Gleyre. After an unsuccessful Salon debut in 1848 and further unsuccessful exhibitions the following year, he worked as a designer at the Sèvres porcelain factory. An enamelled casket of his design received a medal at the London International Exhibition of 1851, after which he returned to painting.

Hamon's La Comédie humaine, exhibited at the Salon of 1852, marked a turning point in his career, and Ma sœur n'y est pas, purchased by Napoleon III, earned him a third-class medal in 1853. At the Paris International Exhibition of 1855 he received a second-class medal and was made a member of the Legion of Honour. He later spent time in Italy, particularly Capri, and his Italian period included Les Muses à Pompéi, which was exhibited at the Salon of 1866 and the International Exhibition of 1867. His final work, Le Triste Rivage, appeared at the Salon of 1873. Hamon died the following year at Saint-Raphaël, where he had settled on the Mediterranean coast.

== Biography ==
Hamon was born at Plouha, in today's Côtes-d'Armor département, in France. At an early age he was intended for the priesthood, and placed under the care of the brothers Lamennais, but his strong desire to become a painter finally triumphed over family opposition, and in 1840 he left Plouha for Paris—his sole resources being a pension of five hundred francs, granted him for one year only by the municipality of his native town.

At Paris Hamon received valuable advice and encouragement from Paul Delaroche and Charles Gleyre, and in 1848 he made his debut at the Salon with Le Tombeau du Christ (Musée de Marseille), and a decorative work, Dessus de Porte. The works which he exhibited in 1849, Une Affiche romaine, L'Égalité au sérail, and Perroquet jasant avec deux jeunes filles, obtained no marked success.

His lack of success led Hamon to accept a job as a designree in the Sèvres porcelein factory, but an enamelled casket designed by him attracted notice at the London International Exhibition of 1851. He received a medal, and, inspired by his success, left his post to try his chances again at the Salon of 1852. "La Comédie humaine", which he then exhibited, turned the tide of his fortune, and Ma sœur n'y est pas (purchased by the emperor Napoleon III) obtained for its author a third-class medal in 1853. At the Paris International Exhibition of 1855, when Hamon re-exhibited the casket of 1851, together with several vases and pictures of which L'Amour et son troupeau, Ce n'est pas moi, and Une Gardeuse d'enfants were the most important, he received a second class medal and the ribbon of the legion of honor.

In the following year he was absent in the East, and in 1857 he reappeared with Boutique à quatre sous, Papillon enchaîné, Cantharide esclave, Dévideuses, etc., in all ten pictures; L'Amour en visite was contributed to the Salon of 1859, and Vierge de Lesbos, Tutelle, La Volière, L'Escamoteur and La Sœur aînée were all seen in 1861.

Hamon spent some time in Italy, chiefly at Capri, whence in 1864 he sent to Paris L'Aurore and Un Jour de fiançailles. The influence of Italy was also evident in Les Muses à Pompéi, his sole contribution to the Salon of 1866, a work which enjoyed great popularity and was re-exhibited at the International Exhibition of 1867, together with, La Promenade and six other pictures of previous years. His last work, Le Triste Rivage, appeared at the Salon of 1873. It was painted at Saint-Raphaël, where Hamon had finally settled in a little house on the shores of the Mediterranean, close by Alphonse Karr's famous garden. In this house he died on 29 May 1874.

== Eponyms ==
A school in his home town of Plouha was named after him, and a monument was erected to him by the Blues of Brittany.

== Gallery ==
Jean-Louis Hamon

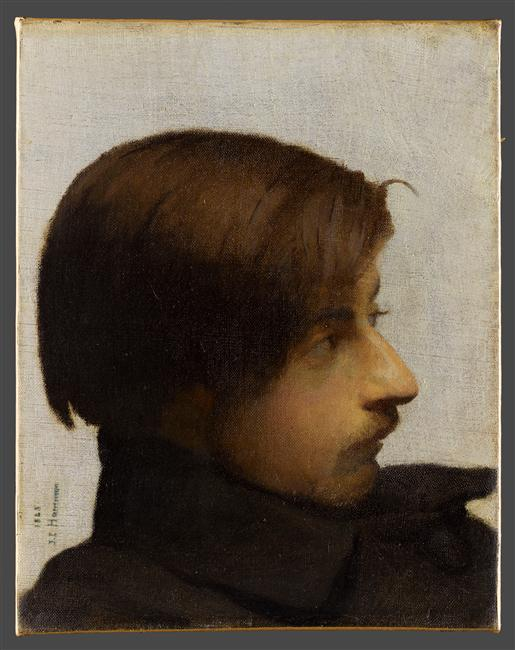
Jean-Louis Hamon (self portrait)

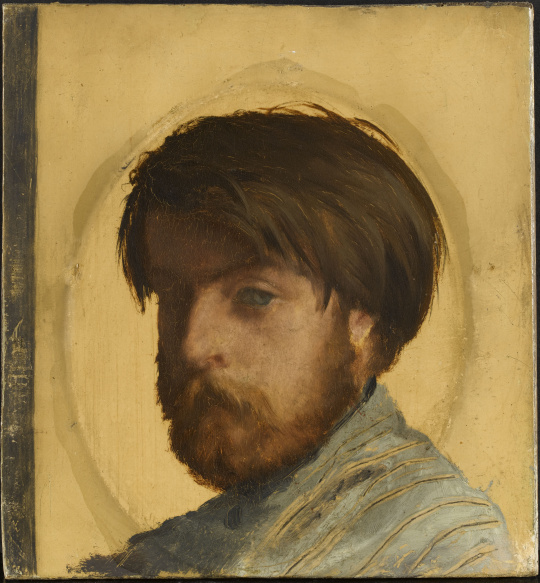
Portrait of Auguste Toulmouche

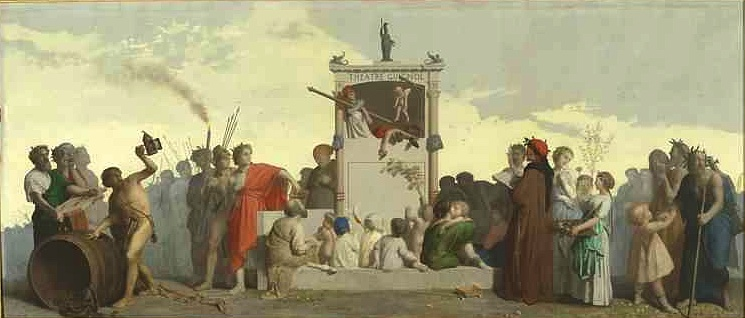
La Comédie humaine (1852)

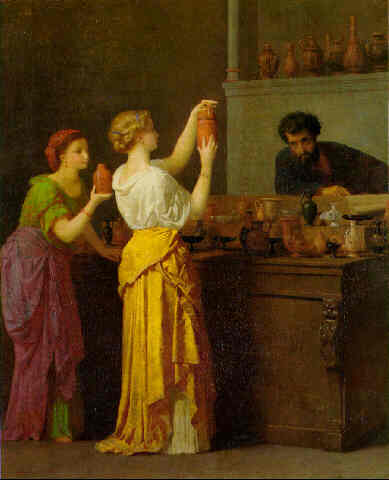
Old China Shop (Pompeii)

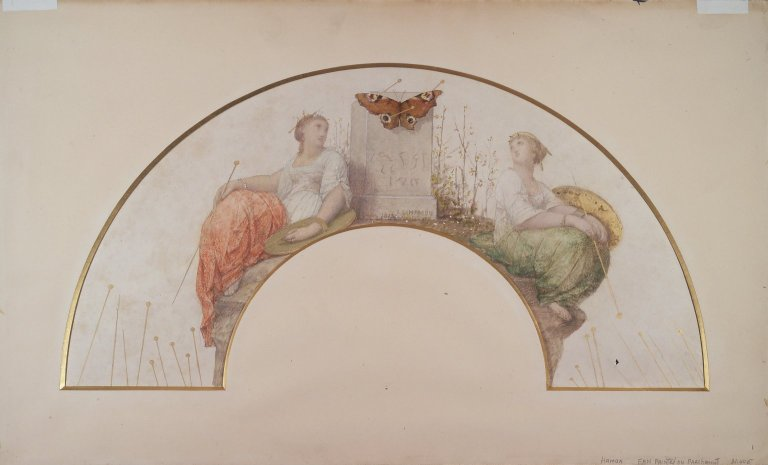
Entomologist (Design for a Fan)
