= Zhane tribe =

Circassian tribe

Zhane
Жанэ
- The tamga of the Bechqan princely house which ruled the Zhane Principality

Languages
- Adyghe (Zhane sub-dialect)

Religion
- Predominantly: Sunni Islam

Related ethnic groups
- Other Circassian tribes

The Zhane were one of the twelve major Circassian tribes, representing one of the twelve stars on the green-and-gold Circassian flag. They lived in the Zhane Principality of Circassia.

== History ==
The Zhane were a very powerful Circassian tribe in the past. They lived the north of the Natukhaj tribe's land on the coast of the Black Sea and Azov Sea in Eastern Europe. A map of the 17th century also shows they lived right by the coast of the lower flow of Kubans, beyond Taman and Atchu. As a result of the bloody Russian–Circassian War and the subsequent genocide, the Zhaney tribe was almost wholly destroyed, as only 3 families survived.

== See also ==
- Other Circassian tribes:
- Abzakh
- Besleney
- Bzhedug
- Hatuqay
- Kabardian
- Mamkhegh
- Natukhai
- Shapsug
- Chemguy
- Ubykh
- Yegeruqwai
