= Human Comedy (Hamon) =

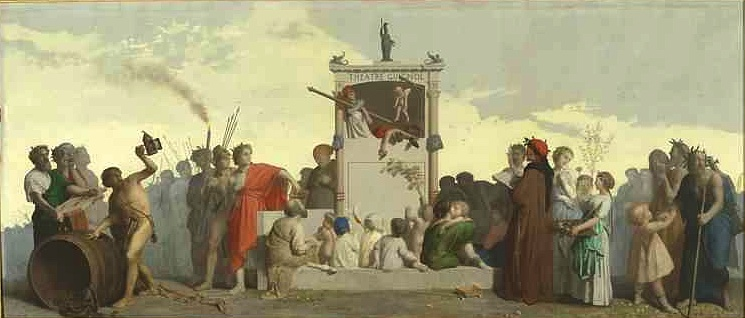
Jean-Louis Hamon - La Comédie humaine

Human Comedy (French: Comédie humaine) is an oil painting by the French artist Jean-Louis Hamon. It was first exhibited at the Salon of 1852 and s currently in the collections of the Musée d'Orsay.

== Provenance ==
Acquired from the artist by the French state in 1852, the painting was held in the Musée du Luxembourg from 1879-1885. It was then assigned to the Louvre where it remained until 1953. From 1953-1984 it was held in the Château de Compiègne before being transferred to the Musée d’Orsay.

A sketch for the work is held at the Musée d'Art et d'Histoire in Geneva.

== Composition ==
Hamon said that the idea for the painting came to him while he was reading Dante. The painting depicts a scene in the mythical Elysian fields, where the heroic figures of the past dwell. In the centre of the composition stands a puppet theatre called the Théâre Guignol, which was the name of a popular puppet theatre on the Champs Elysées at the time. In front of it sits a group of children, along with Socrates. To the right stand great poets of the past, Homer, Aeschylus, Virgil and Dante. On the left stand warriors and philosophers, including Diogenes and Alexander the Great. Taking payment for the puppet show is an old woman who represents the Church.

The serious expressions and formal manner of the historical figures contrast with natural and graceful poses of the women and children, painted in a half-classical and half-modern manner. The work invites the viewer to share with them a spectacle in which love is hanged, Bacchus is thrashed, and Minerva settles everyone’s accounts. The painting can be seen as a parody of Ingres’ The Apotheosis of Homer, making light of the formal classicism that dominated academic art.

== Exhibition history ==
- 1852 - Salon - Palais-Royal, Paris
- 1855 - Exposition Universelle - Palais des Beaux-Arts, Paris
- 2016-17 - Spectaculaire Second Empire - musée d'Orsay, Paris, 2016-2017

== Critical reception ==
The painting enjoyed public success despite its unusual subject. and effectively established Hamon’s reputation. it was noted for its fresh and original interpretation of antiquity through very modern eyes. It was this unconventional treatment of the subject, rather than the subject itself, which some critics found disorienting. Some felt that the popularity of the work arose not because of its beauty or emotional power, but because it was a kind of puzzle that many of the public enjoyed trying to solve.

Among the unkinder critics were Marie-Noémi Cadiot who burst out “Mr Hamin is certainly smoking opium” while the Goncourt brothers described it as a “time-travelling cosmopolitan nightmare that seems to modelled on pieces of nonsense rhyme, bathed in the light of an eclipse. Only two colours, pallid yellow and violet, share Mr. Hamon’s palette. The drawing is soft, spiritless and loose… the viewer is shocked at every point by his lack of anatomical experience…. Mr Hamon’s figures have no eyes.” Some of the initial negativity had died down by the time the painting was exhibited at the 1855 Exposition Universelle, though Théophile Gautier, who saw it there for the second time, was unmoved and called it a “bizarre composition.” With the passage of time it has been regarded as ever less controversial.
