= Jean-Baptiste Jules Trayer =

French painter

Jean-Baptiste Jules Trayer (1824 – 1909) was a French painter. He signed his works "Jules Trayer".

== Biography ==
He was taught by his father who was a landscape painter and by Justin Lequien at the Académie Suisse in Paris. He specialized as a "genre" painter, particularly depicting scenes in Brittany. Trayer was a regular exhibitor at the Paris Salon from 1847 onwards and was awarded third class medals at the Paris Salons of 1853 and 1855.

== Works exhibited at the Paris Salon ==
- La Dernière Grappe - Le panier vide. Salon 1847.
- Le Dernier Regard. Salon 1848.
- Shakespeare dans la taverne de la Couronne écoutant la lecture et la critique d'une de ses pièces. Salon 1850.
- Léonard de Vinci au milieu de ses élèves. Salon 1852 .
- La Liseuse - Jeune fille cousant - Une leçon de broderie. Salon 1853.
- Atelier de couture - Une mère - le bain de pieds - Escès de travail. Salon 1855,
- Les Deux Parts - La retenue, élève de l'école supérieure de Quimperlé (Finistère) - Intérieur d'un marché aux grains, jour de grand marché (Finistère). Salon 1857.
- La Famille, époque des vacances - Sérénité. Salon 1859.
- Un examen - Le point de tapisserie - Anxiété - La prière. Salon 1861.
- Un jardin public - Les premiers sourires - La becquée. Salon 1863.
- Les Cueilleuses de moules du Pollet à Dieppe. Salon 1864,
- Intérieur dans la Haute-Savoie - Les jumeaux. Salon 1865,
- La Gardeuse d'enfants à Quimperlé - La marchande de crêpes, jour de marché à Qimperlé. Salon 1866
- La Réunion du Mouton-Blanc en 1866 (Molière fait la lecture du Misanthrope). Salon 1867.
- L'Alphabet Salon 1868,
- L'École des filles de Réville (Manche) - Les deux sœurs, Quimperlé. Salon 1869,
- Une sœur de Bon-Secours de Troyes - Le livre d'images. Salon 1870,
- Kéménéred (tailleuses) de Pont-Aven (Finistère). Salon 1872,
- Le Ruban neuf (Finistère) - Un peu de soleil (Finistère). Salon 1873,
- Coutoures. Salon 1874.
- Jeune femme et enfants aquarelle - Les rubans Water colour.(aquarelle). Salon 1875,
- Laveuses et enfants dans une cour de village - La difficulté. Salon 1877,
- Intérieur de cour. Salon 1878,
- Pêcheuses du Tréport (Seine-Inférieure) attendant la basse mer. Salon 1879,
- La Plus Jeune de la famille Watercolour (aquarelle). Salon 1881.
- Demi-repos. Salon 1882.

== Other works ==
Trayor executed a lithograph depicting a portrait of Charles Lagrange the politician. This lithograph can be seen in the Musée national du château de Compiègne.

== Gallery ==
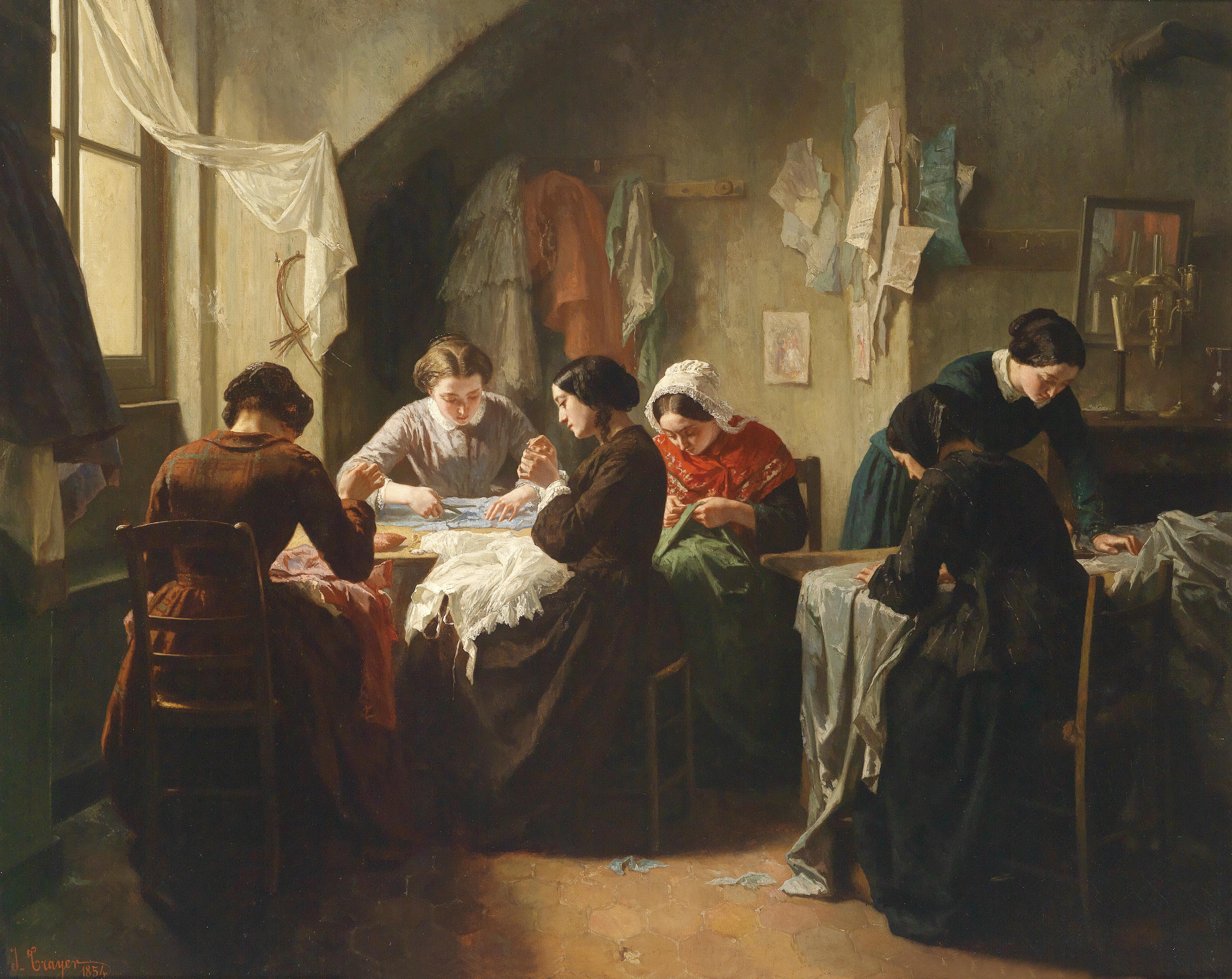
Atelier de couture. Painting dating to 1854. Painting depicts dressmakers in a workshop.

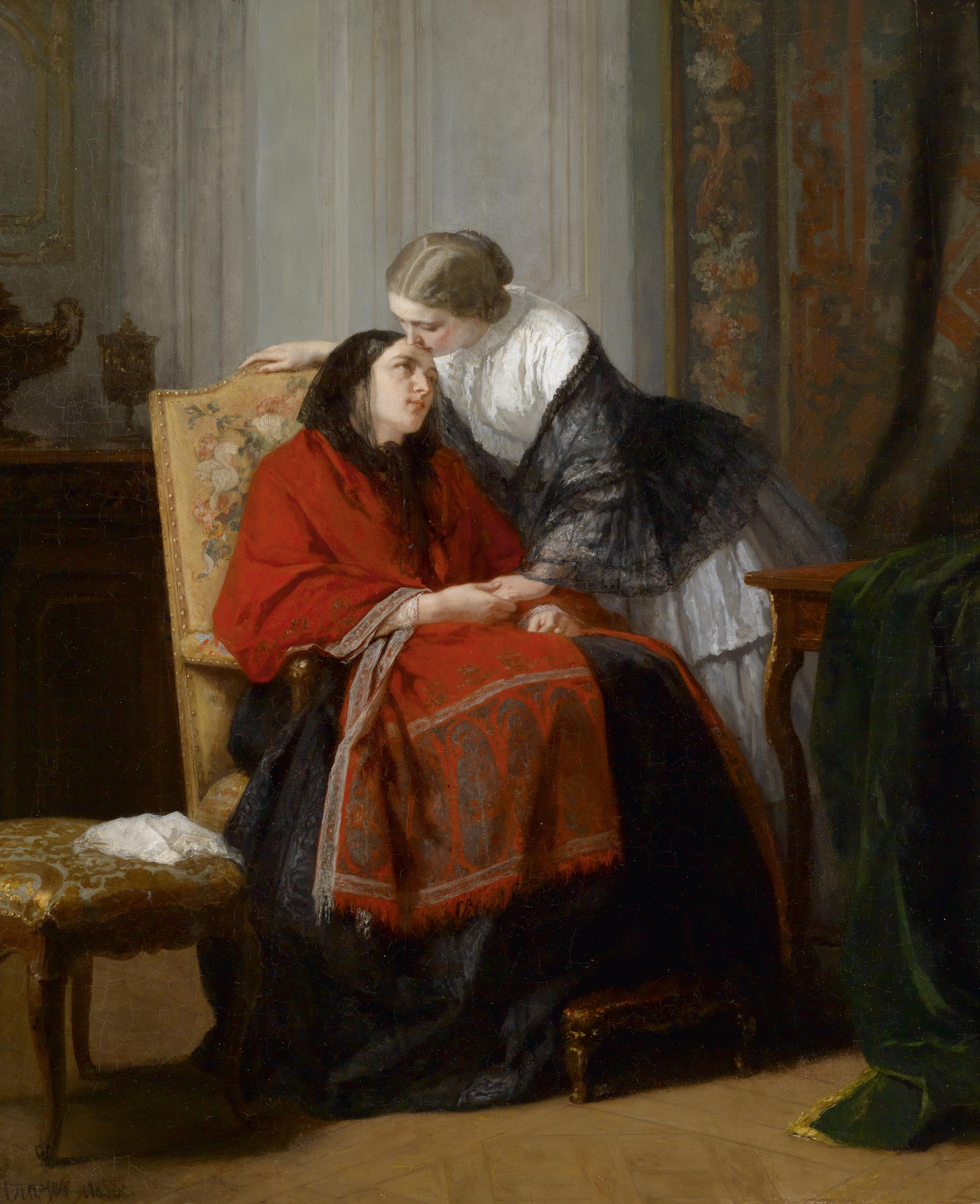
1858 painting entitled "The kiss" (Le Baiser).

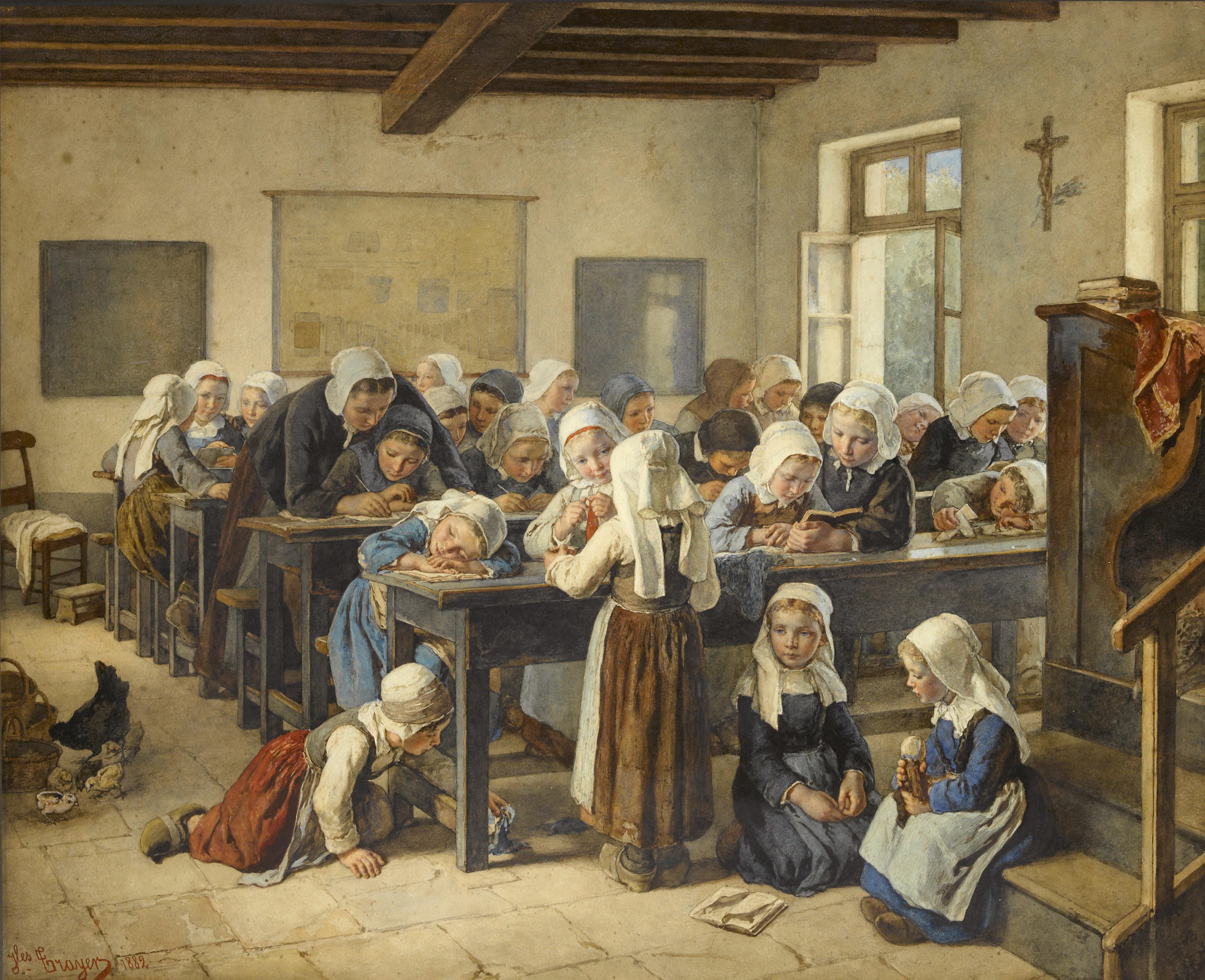
1882 painting depicting Breton children in school (École d'enfants bretons).

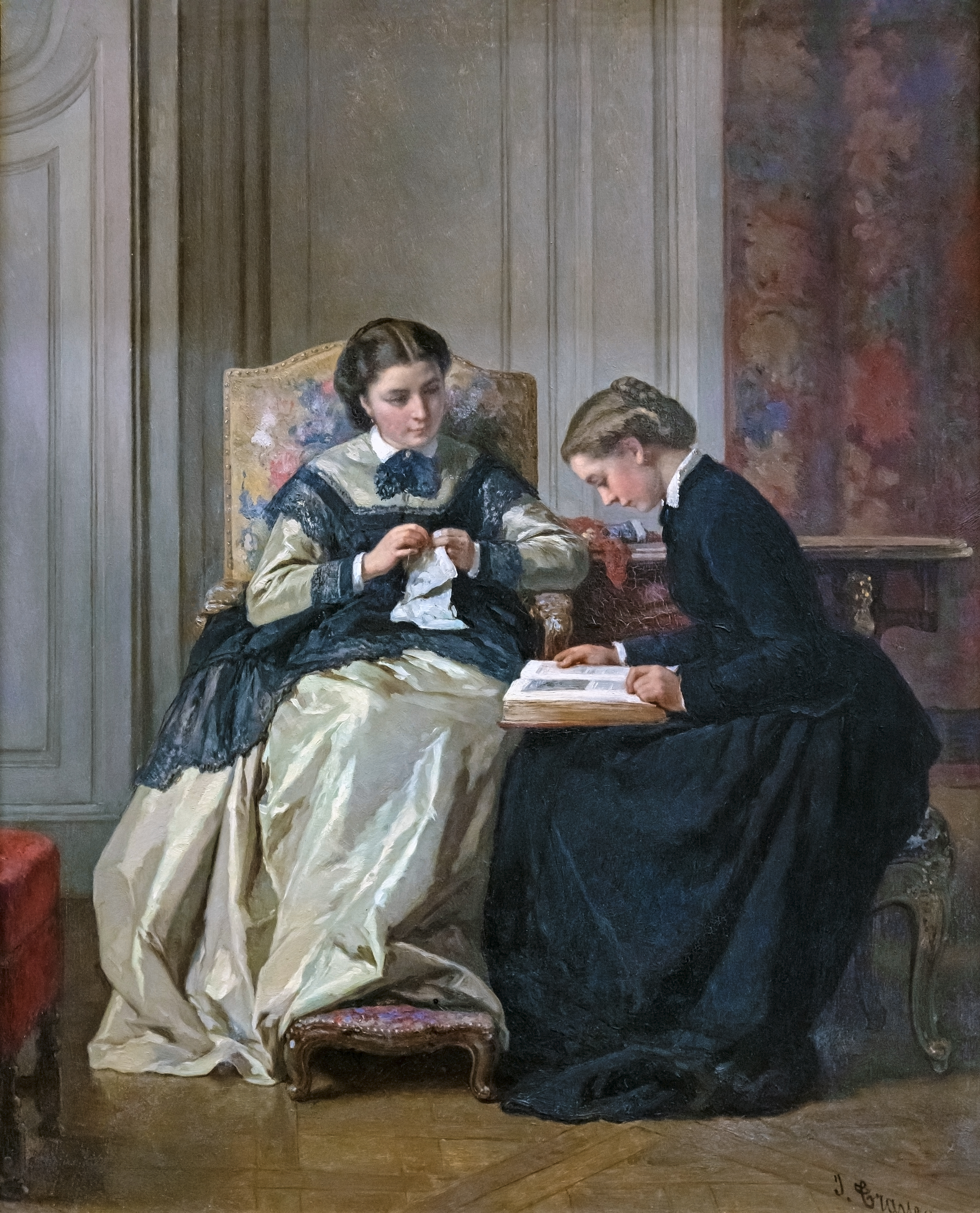
Painting entitled Le travail. This painting can be seen in the Musée des beaux-arts in Carcassonne.

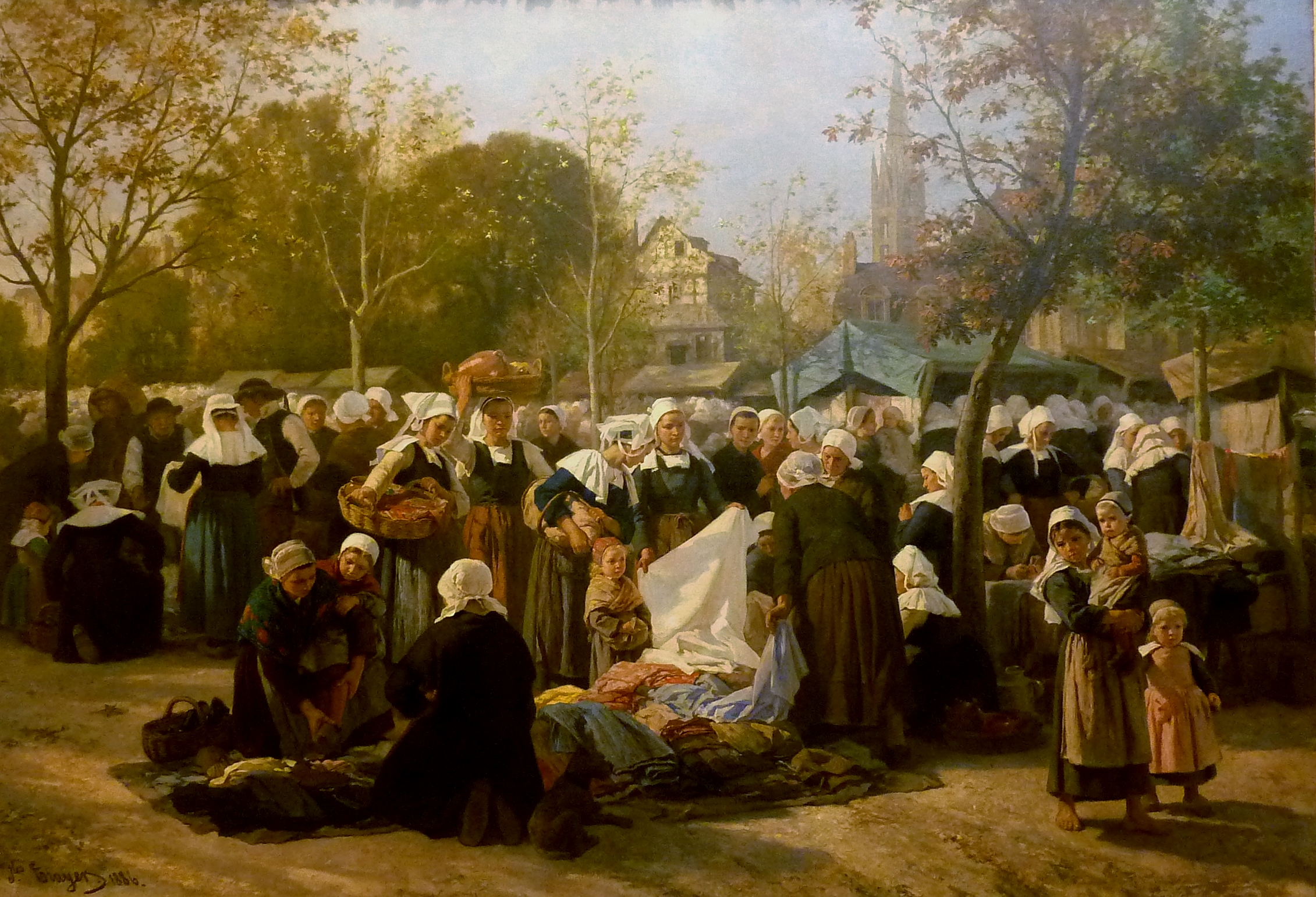
A market scene entitled Marché aux chiffons dans le Finistère. Painting dates to 1886 and is held in the Quimper Musée des beaux-arts.

== Bibliography ==
- Émile Bellier de La Chavignerie, Dictionnaire général des artistes de l'École française depuis l'origine des arts du dessin jusqu'à nos jours : architectes, peintres, sculpteurs, graveurs et lithographes, Volume 2, p. 588-589, Librairie Renouard, Paris, 1885 (online)
- Geneviève Lacambre, Jacqueline de Rohan-Chabot, Le Musée du Luxembourg en 1874, p. 174, Éditions des Musées Nationaux, Paris, 1974
- Maxime Du Camp, Les Beaux-Arts à l'Exposition universelle de 1855 : peinture, sculpture, France, Angleterre, Belgique, Danemarck, Suède et Norwège, Suisse, Hollande, Allemagne, Italie, p. 218, 227, 229, Librairie nouvelle, Paris, 1855 (online)
- Théophile Gautier, Les beaux-arts en Europe, 1855, p. 92-94, Michel Lévy, Paris, 1856 (online)
