= Principality of Hatuqay =

Historical principality and province of Circassia

Principality of Hatuqay Хьатыкъое Пщыгъо
- c. 1330s–1863
- A tamga of the Cherchanuqo, a line of the Hatuqo dynasty which ruled the Hatuqay

- Seal of Prince Jandjeriy Cherchanuqo (1827)

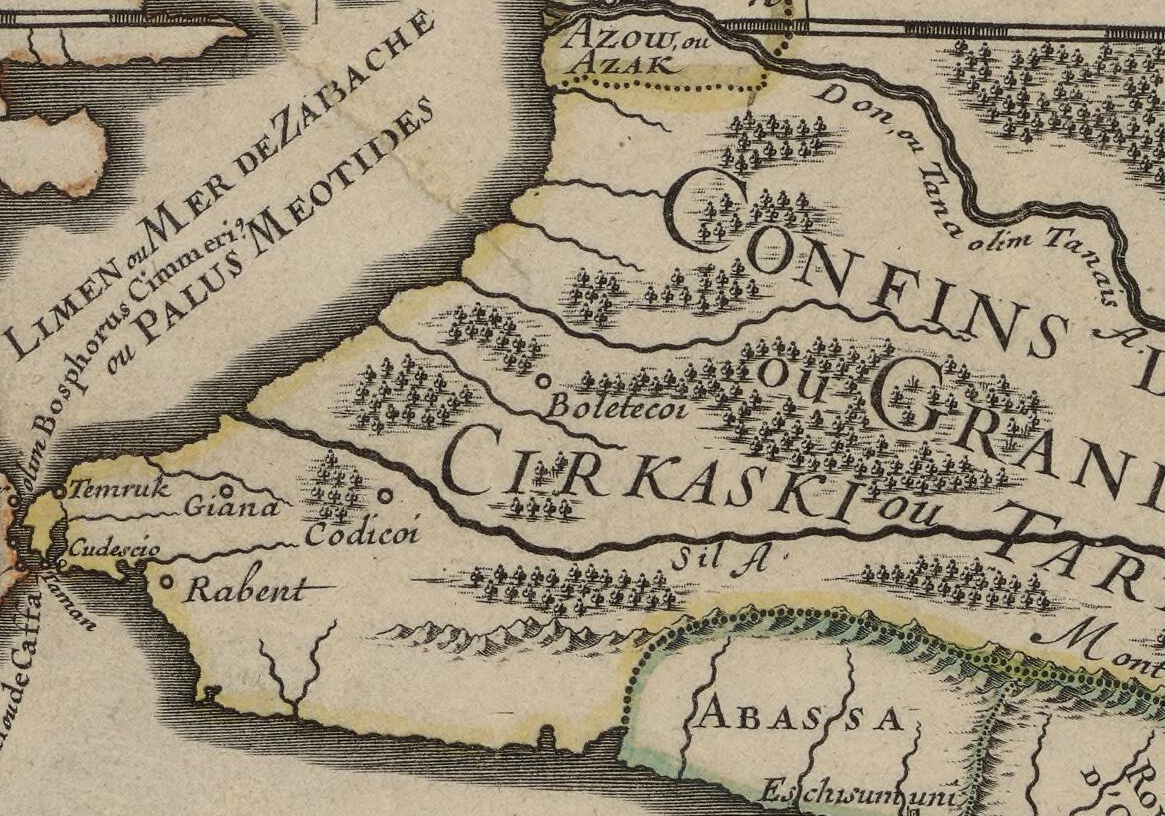
- "Codicoi" represents the Hatuqay Principality on this 1681 map by Guillaume Sanson, Estats de l'Empire du Grand Seigneur des Turcs.

- Principality of Hatuqay in the first quarter of the 19th century, in its smallest borders
- Capital: Хьатикъо икъуадж "Hatuqo's Aul" (Various princely auls over time (Пщым икъуадж), all belonging to the Hatuqo clan)
- Common languages: Adyghe (Hatuqay dialect); Crimean Tatar (Lingua franca and language of diplomacy)
- Religion: Khabzeism & Eastern Orthodoxy (c. 1330s – early 17th century); Sunni Islam (Hanafi) (early 17th century – 1863)
- Demonym: Hatuqay
- Government: Principality (c. 1330s – 1862); Elective Council (1862–1863)
- Prince
  - c. 1330s (first): Hatuqo
  - c. 1852 – 1862 (last): Indar Cherchanuqo
- People's Administrator
  - 1862 – 1863: Indar Cherchanuqo
- History
  - Established: c. 1330s
  - Conversion to Islam; nominal loyalty to Ottoman Caliphate: 17th century
  - Autonomous under the Caucasian Imamate: 1849 – 1851
  - Part of Russian sphere: 1852 – 1863
  - Disestablished: 1863
Preceded by	Succeeded by
Zichia	Russian Empire
- Today part of: Russia (Republic of Adygea, Krasnodar Krai)

The Principality of Hatuqay (Note: Adyghe: Хьатыкъое Пщыгъо, Russian: Хатукайское княжество) was a historical principality in Circassia, inhabited by Hatuqay Circassians. Established in the 14th century by separating from the Chemguy Principality, it was ruled by the Cherchanuqo family, a branch of the Hatuqo dynasty claiming descent from Inal the Great. Originally located near the Taman Peninsula and the Black Sea coast near the Shapsugs, the Hatuqay eventually settled in the fertile lands south of the Kuban River, between the Belaya and Pshish rivers, flanked by the Bzhedug and Chemguy principalities. The principality was marked on period maps with various names including Hatukai, Codicoi, and Gatyukai, such as on a 1787 map by Johann Anton Güldenstädt, and on a 1675 map by Frederik de Wit.

Known for their martial culture, the Hatuqay maintained a significant military force and frequently engaged in warfare against the Crimean Khanate and rival Circassian principalities. Hatuqay had a large Armenian population; as Circassian nobility considered trade a cowardly profession, they hosted a large number of Cherkesogai Armenians to serve as a merchant class. The Principality of Hatuqay took part in the Russo-Circassian War and was ultimately annexed and abolished by the Russian military administration in 1863; its population was forcibly resettled, dispersed or killed, effectively removing the Hatuqay people from the map.

== History ==
=== Medieval Period ===
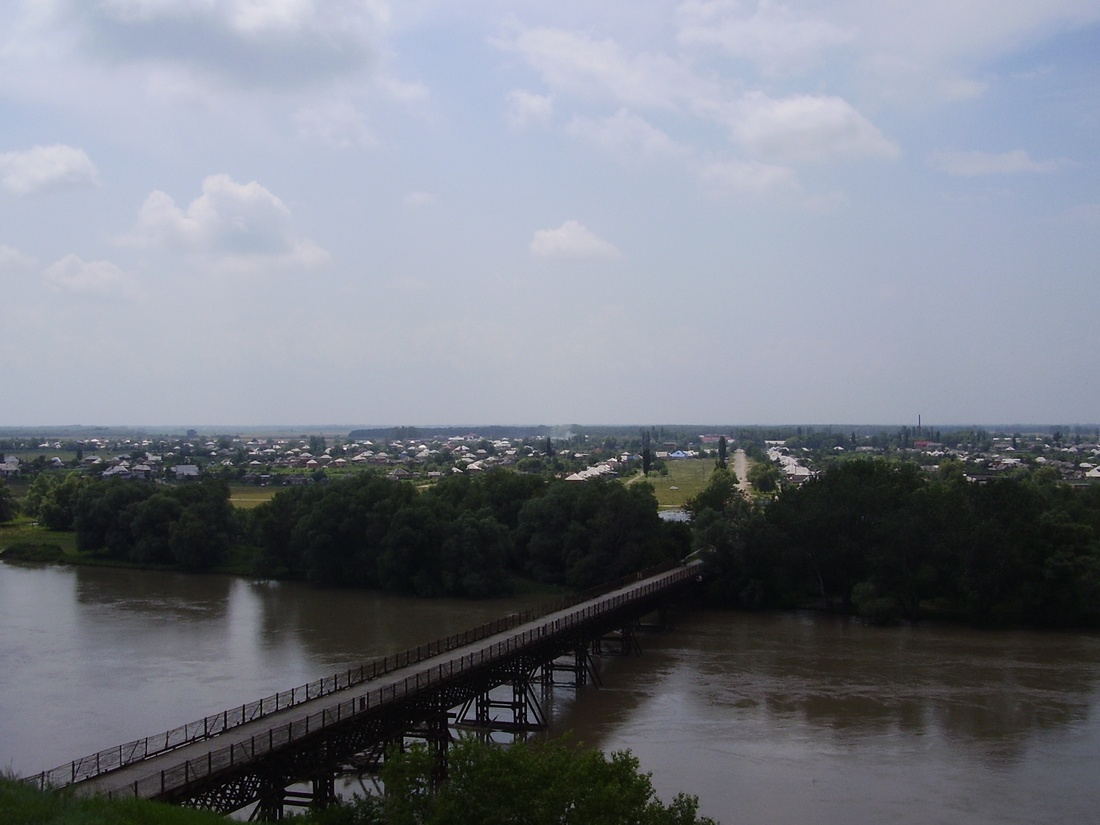
Village of Khatukay (Хатукай / Хьатыкъуай) in the Republic of Adygea, where the Hatuqay no longer reside

The Principality split from Chemguy in the 1330s. Almost all knowledge about the founding of the Hatuqay Principality and people comes from oral history. According to these oral accounts, the founding dynasty of the Hatuqay Principality descends from king Inal: Prince Hatuqo (Adyghe: Хьатыкъо) was the grandson of Inal, son of Chemrug and brother of Prince Boletoqo (Adyghe: Болэтыкъо), the first prince of the Chemguy Principality. The Hatuqays initially resided in the Zhaney region and separated from this region. The name Hatuqay derives from Prince Hatuqo, who was the brother of Prince Boletoqo (Adyghe: Болэтыкъо), the first prince of the Principality of Chemguy. In the period following Inal's death, the Chemguy Principality was divided into two principalities. One became the land of Prince Boletoqo, and the other, Prince Hatuqo. The elder brother, Prince Boletoqo, remained in his principality in the region between the Greater Laba and Shkhakoshem rivers, retaining the name Chemguy. Prince Hatuqo, however, moved west and established the new principality of Hatuqay in the Zhaney lands.

A legend describes the separation of the principalities: The Chemguy and Hatuqay were originally one people ruled by three brothers: Boletoqo, Zan, and Hatuqo. The brothers Boletoqo and Hatuqo, as infants, were sleeping in the same bed covered by a single fur cloth. In the morning, the cloth was found torn in two, leading their mother to shriek, "Woe unto you, Chemirgoy! They have torn you asunder!". The brothers lived in peace until the younger two, Zan and Hatuqo, decided to separate from the eldest, Boletoqo. Prince Boletoqo punished the separatists by stripping them of their property. Hatuqo, tiring of his brother's authority, took his subjects and migrated west to establish a new principality.

According to oral history, Hatuqo had a son, referred to as "great son of Hatuqo" (Adyghe: Хьатыкъокъошхо), who had two sons: Biberd (Adyghe: Бибэрд) and Indar (Adyghe: Индар). Biberd became the ancestor of the subsequent ruling line of Hatuqay princes. Legends attribute the origin of the Padis noble family (tlakotlesh) to Biberd's companion, Kalmyk. Indar's line lost princely authority among the Hatuqays because his sons, Adam and Deguzhiy, were born of a non-noble mother. They eventually left to join the Chemguy princes, founding the Deguzhiyeqo (Adyghe: Дэгужъыекъо) noble family.

Some historians suggested that the Kheghache principality was separated from the Hatuqays. The word "Kheghache" (ХэгъакIэ) means "breakaways". According to Amjad Jaimoukha, it was the Hakuch people who split from Hatuqays, which contributed to the weakening of the principality. In addition, Hatuqay and Hytuk may refer to the same entity.

Hatuqay princes later claimed descent from Quraysh: according to later legends, Hatuqo was an Arab and a relative of Caliph Umar, after accidentally blinding a nobleman, he fled Arabia to Circassia via Kars to escape execution.

=== Early Modern Period ===
In the 16th century, one of the Hatuqay princes, nicknamed "Pale," (Adyghe: Шъуагъо) looted Astrakhan in alliance with the Kabardians led by Beslan the Fat.

==== Relations with the Crimean Khanate ====
As a successor state to the Golden Horde, the Crimean Khanate claimed sovereignty over the Circassia. This political relationship was characterized primarily by the obligation of Circassian princes to pay tribute to the Crimean Khan, predominantly in the form of slaves. This tribute was demanded upon the ascension of a new Khan to the throne or levied as fines for crimes committed by Circassian subjects. When Circassian leaders refused to deliver the required number of captives, the Crimean leadership launched punitive military expeditions to enforce payment. These raids were justified by labelling the Circassians as "infidels". This justification became complicated from the 16th century onward as the Circassians increasingly converted to Islam; however Crimean Khans often ignored these conversions and rejected negotiations with Circassian envoys who pleaded over their shared religion.

Despite the presence of Islam, there was debate over whether the region is Dar al-Harb (the Abode of War), where slaves could be taken, or Dar al-Islam (the Abode of Islam), which would prevent enslavement. Despite some legal rulings (kanunname) suggesting Sharia should apply to certain people (which would protect them), the Ottoman state supported the Crimean Khan in enslaving Circassians, treating the region effectively as a source of slaves regardless of religious affiliation. It was not possible to determine whether the Circassians entering the Ottoman market were from Dar al-Harb or not, as both allied Muslim Circassians and non-Muslim Circassians were raided by the Khanate. The Circassians were described as "neither Christians nor Muslims" by a courtier of the Crimean Khan. Some Ottoman chroniclers mention that the Circassians fought against the Crimean Khanate because they could not stand the "Tatar tyranny and oppression" (Turkish: zülm ü cevre). In some cases, the Circassians pleaded with the Ottoman sultan directly, arguing that they were fellow Muslims, thus it was therefore "against the sharia to turn them into slaves". The Sultan withdrew permission for the Khan's campaigns based on this argument, although the Khan proceeded regardless.

The Hatuqay maintained control over fertile lowlands and crucial trade routes in the northwestern Caucasus, resisting both Tatar incursions and pressure. Tensions escalated throughout the 1540s as the Hatuqay leadership increasingly resisted demands for tribute and subordination. According to the Crimean Chronicle "Tārih̲-i Ṣāḥib Giray H̲ān", the events were as follows:

The Hatuqay princes Aledjuq and his brother Antenuq were involved in acts against the Crimean Khanate. Aledjuq is quoted as saying: (Note: ḫān bizi ġāret etmege varurın dėrmiş, / biz (19) Jane (20) ve Kabartay gibi / degülüz (21). Ol ṭopla / żarbzenine ṭayanub germ olur- muş (22), amma benim / ṭob ve tüfengim (23) sarp / ṭaġlar ve (24) aġırmaḳ atlardur. Ol / 'araba (25) ile ne / iş ėderüm der ola (26). Ḥānıñ ne cānı vardur ki benüm / üzerime (27) gele. Eger gelürse aña bir iş / ėderim (28) ki 'ālemde destān ola)

The Khan, they say, is coming to plunder us, but we are not like the Zhaney and Kabardians. He is strong because of his cannons and artillery, but our cannons and muskets are the steep mountains and neighing horses. What could I possibly do with those cannon carts? What strength does the Khan have that he would come against me? If he comes, I will do such a thing to him that it shall become a legend in the world!

— Aledjuq

Crimean Khan Sahib I Giray organized a punitive expedition in 1551, aiming to break Hatuqay resistance and assert Crimean authority in the region. A Tatar chronicle claims this was because the Circassians, led by Aledjuq, raided a Crimean caravan near Azov in 1551; however, the Ottoman Sultan had already sanctioned a raid. The Khan set out on the path, exclaiming "where are you, sons of Hatuqay!" (Note: ḳandesün / Ḥanṭuḳ Oġılları !) The Hatuqay princes, upon hearing of the Khan approaching to plunder, led their population to hide deep into the mountains. They also forged an alliance with the Bzhedugs under their prince Buzhaduk (the founder of Bzhedug and the father of Cherchan and Khamish), who encouraged resistance and sided with them. Aledjuq and Buzhaduk spent five days feasting. The Khan sent his commanders to kill Aledjuq in his sleep; but he woke up to a horse's neigh and bolted off his house with his closest men. One Tatar commander suggested attacking, but the other said, "Could any man possibly face them?", and allowed Aledjuq and his 15 men to escape without a fight. The Khan, upon hearing of this, was enraged: (Note: «Bre yaman ḳaltaḳlar ! Ben sizi ilerü çėküb adam ėtdim. Benim devletimde, bunca māl ıssı olub, kişi / şa- dedine girdiniz. Sizi adam dėyü çeri başı ėdüb, / iki üç biñ adamla gönderdim. On bėş / nefer kişiye muḳabele / olmayub, ḳaçurasız hemi !»)

You egregious bitches, I indulged you, I made men out of you. Under my rule, you became rich and respected. Thinking you are men, I made you commanders and sent you at the head of two or three thousand men. You could not even stop 15 men, and you let them escape. Is that so?!

— Sahib Giray

The Khan had the commanders humiliated and tortured. Following Aledjuq's escape, the Khan established a heavily fortified camp surrounded by trenches and stakes near a large, impassable river. He then pursued the Hatuqays and their Bzhedug allies deeper into the mountains, eventually ambushing them at the site where they were dividing the stolen goods from the pilgrims. The Hatuqay forces, though outnumbered, leveraged their knowledge of the landscape to conduct guerrilla-style warfare, harassing the advancing Crimean army and inflicting significant losses. The battle itself was marked by a series of skirmishes and ambushes, with neither side achieving a decisive victory in the initial stages. The Hatuqay were eventually overwhelmed by the superior numbers and resources of the Crimean forces. Antenuq was captured and tortured to death with hot iron. The Khan's army advanced further into the region, capturing key settlements and strongholds. 30 to 40 thousand slaves were taken, the Hatuqay population was tortured en masse, and Aledjuq's village was burnt to the ground.

The Khan had inflicted severe blows on almost all major principalities of Circassia: Zhaney, Hatuqay, Bzhedug, Kabardia. It is after this that the Circassians started to seek alliances with Russia to fight against Tatar incursions. However, despite claims of victory reported to the Ottomans by Sahib Giray, the Circassians were not subdued. While the Khan was engaged in his campaign against the Hatuqays, his nephew, Devlet Giray, successfully seized the khanate's throne in Crimea. This usurpation was sanctioned by the Ottoman Sultan, and Sahib Giray's entire government and army defected to the new ruler without any resistance. Forced to flee, the deposed Khan sought refuge in the fortress of Temryuk, but envoys sent by Devlet Giray swiftly arrived and hacked both him and his son to death. The usurpation was followed by a ruthless purge in Crimea, where all of Sahib Giray's remaining sons, including his youngest children, were summarily executed. The Hatuqay principality led by Prince Aledjuq took part in the Ottoman–Safavid War (1578–1590) on the side of the Ottoman Empire, as an ally of the Crimean Khanate. Before the campaign, the Khan Mehmed II Giray, who was married to a Besleney Circassian noblewoman, consulted the Besleney prince Mejajuq Tutcheriy, who advised the Khan to not issue an order to the Circassians, instead he suggested the Khan simply let it be known that all Circassians, regardless of society or social rank, were free to join him. According to the Circassian advisor, only by making it voluntary would the Khan be able to gather a large force from among the Circassians.

Aledjuq ruled during a period of conflict between the Chemguys and the Bzhedugs. Aledjuq allied with the Chemguy prince Tumenish against the Bzhedugs. In the battle, Tumenish was killed, thus Aledjuq took command of the Hatuqay-Chemguy forces, rallying the confused troops to defeat the Bzhedugs.

Giovanni Lucca mentioned the principality in the early 1600s. The Ottoman-Turkish explorer Evliya Çelebi visited the Hatuqay region in the 1660s, and met Prince Janbegirey (Adyghe: Джанджэрый); Çelebi wrote in his book, Seyahatnâme:

The Great Province of Hatuqay. Its prince is named Jangirey, that is, Janbe Giray. When Janbe Giray Sultan was a guest there, a child was born to the prince that very night; thus, they named him Jangirey after Janbe Giray Sultan. To this day, Circassian traditions are such that if a son is born while a guest is in the house, they name him after the guest. At that very moment, a wet nurse takes the boy away to another place. She feeds and raises him even better than his own mother and father could. We observed that this is still the case. If there is no guest in the house, they give the boy the name of a neighbor; this is their ancient custom. This Hatuqay prince is wealthy, possessing many livestock and 8,000 fully armed soldiers. Because this province is a vast, fertile, and beautiful homeland, the Nevruz Mirza Tatars—who fled the Muscovite King after he killed his son, fighting their way through the Kalmyk infidels, crossing the Volga River and the Heyhat Plains—have settled here on the banks of the Kuban River in Hatuqay Circassian territory. They became kin. In total, they number 10,000 soldiers and 6,000 tents. They are exceedingly skilled with quivers, silver-inlaid gear, and weapons, and are valiant soldiers.

If you were to call this Circassian tribe "infidels," they would grant you neither mercy nor time, but would kill you on the spot. Furthermore, they say "La ilahe illallah" (There is no god but God), yet they eat fat pigs starting from the tail; they do not fast or perform the daily prayers, and they do not allow anyone who does not own a pig into the village. They have absolutely no churches, bazaars, markets, inns, or bathhouses. All travelers and passersby stay in private homes. If you are a guest in a house and leave your goods and property out in the open, not a single scrap will be harmed. Even if you were their enemy, the host and his neighbors would die for your sake. They would not let any harm come to you.

This Circassian language, even now, cannot be written down; it is a language based on listening, produced from the throat, cheeks, and under the tongue, a sound that is like a sparrow's chirp and cannot be committed to paper. This humble servant of God, a traveler of the world and companion to man, the unpretentious Evliya, has traveled for 51 years, setting foot in 18 kingdoms across seven climes, and has written down 147 languages with my gem-scattering pen, including their eloquence, rhetoric, and poems, in order to converse with the people of every region. But I could not write down this Circassian language with its magpie-like sound. By the will of God, we will try to write this language as best as we can. They have a peculiar dialect, for they are not literate. That is why it cannot be committed to paper; it is a bird's language, and that is that.

— Evliya Çelebi, the Seyahatnâme

=== Modern period ===
In the mid 18th century, the Hatuqay were ruled by prince Hapach. Under his rule, relations with the Bzhedugs improved significantly; his daughter was betrothed to the Bzhedug prince Batdjeriy. Relations with the Chemguys deteriorated. During his time, the Hatuqays lived near the modern stanitsa of Severnaya.

According to Russian sources, Hapach had a strained relationship with the Chemguy prince Boletoqo, due to a hunting incident. This specific story has been recorded about Hapach, during a hunt with Boletoqo, the prince of Chemguy:

One day, Boletoqo went hunting and on his way met the Hatuqay prince, Hapach. They agreed to hunt together. A wild boar they had wounded ran out into a clearing and stood under the trunk of a bent tree. No one risked approaching the beast. Only one Chemguy peasant bravely ran up and, with a powerful blow of his saber, chopped it in half from forehead to tail. Boletoqo grew angry and began to scold the peasant: 'How dare you, scoundrel, in the presence of princes, take away their honor of killing the boar themselves? Or do you think that no one but you could have done this?' Hapach did not like this, and he said to Boletoqo: 'Why are you scolding a brave peasant? Or do you think that a prince is permitted to do anything? Today you are a prince, but tomorrow you might find yourself just another peasant.

A burial site located in the Severskaya stanitsa region is named the "holy grave of Hapach" (Khap'ak'e-i-qoth). Hapach's son Jandjeriy led the Hatuqays during the major Shapsug-Bzhedug War. He maintained neutrality during the war, refusing the Shapsug call for help. Following this war, he migrated the Hatuqay people east of the modern Ryazanskaya stanitsa, settling between the Pshish and Belaya rivers. Later, the Hatuqay people moved to Bgyezho on the right bank of the Belaya River.

One of the most famous Hatuqay princes was Aslandjeriy (Adyghe: Аслъанджэрый), who ruled in the early 19th century and was known for his character and oratorical skill despite being physically weak. There is also a Crimean Khan named Arslan-Giray; Circassians would give a subsequent baby born in a village the name of a Crimean Khan if the Khan stayed in that village. The principality reached its zenith during Aslandjeriy's reign. On his deathbed, surrounded by elders and nobles, Aslandjeriy's will stipulated that every slave in the principality be freed according to Islamic obligations, and that no Hatuqay would be a slave thereafter. Following this, slave families in the Hatuqay region were emancipated. Hatuqay, which used to be an important Circassian principality of West Circassia, lost this status with Aslandjeriy's death, as the Hatuqay Principality split into two warring factions.

In the late 18th century, the Hatuqay Principality was relocated west of the Chemguys, in the territory situated between the Belaya (Шъхьагуащэ) and Pshish (Пщыщ) rivers. The Hatuqay absorbed the Sobay, a large Circassian society that lived on the Belaya River. The Hatuqay nobles living in the large village of Sobay were known as Sobe-pshi (Princes of Sobay). In the first half of the 19th century, it shifted further east, settling between the Bzhedughs and the Chemguy. By the first quarter of the 18th century, the population of the Hatuqay principality had sharply declined. In the early 19th century, their numbers were further reduced by a plague epidemic.

During the Russo-Circassian War, Hatuqay territory was subjected to multiple military expeditions and forced relocations. In 1787, Russian forces raided Hatuqay. In a Russian genealogical registry of Circassians from 1804, the Hatuqay are categorized as a pro-Ottoman group of Circassians. In 1824, under the orders of General Katsyrev, Major Dadymov led a detachment of 1,000 Cossacks in an attack on a Hatuqay village located on the Belaya River. Russian troops reportedly killed the inhabitants with swords, rather than using bullets. After the operation, 50 people were captured, and the troops seized 150 cattle and 1,000 sheep. A group of 200 Hatuqays pursued the returning detachment, resulting in casualties that included the Hatuqay nobles.

In 1827, the Hatuqay sent a reassurance document to the Ottoman government, stating that they will stay loyal to the Ottoman caliphate. In 1828, after Hatuqay territory was attacked by Russia, they offered a similar oath to the Russia Empire; but continued fighting against them in reality.

In the 1840s, Hatuqay settlements were primarily located along the Belaya, Laba, and Kuban rivers. Notable settlements included Baroney, owned by Prince Jandjeriy Cherchanuqo. During this time, the Hatuqay allied with Muhammad Amin, the representative of Imam Shamil in the Northwest Caucasus, and pledged to continue the jihad war against Russia.

In 1851, the Hatuqay led by prince Jandjeriy briefly relocated to Muhammad Amin's territory to better fight Russia, following the orders of Muhammad Amin. In June of that year, Prince Jandjeriy contacted Russian General Zavodovsky (infamous among Russian ranks for his "good nature"), proposing ceasefire in return for his people being spared from Russian attacks. Escorted by a column led by Colonel Pullo, the Hatuqay traveled to the Laba River, where Jandjeriy halted the group and demanded a guarantee of protection from Russian forces. General Zavodovsky agreed to these demands, a decision that conflicted with the intentions of his superiors, who wanted the area cleared of Circassians. Thus, the Hatuqay returned to their original lands, with promises of a ceasefire. By next year, the new prince of Hatuqay, Indar Cherchanuqo, even had a nominal rank in the Russian military.

Despite this, in October 1854, Major General Evdokimov attacked a Hatuqay village called Jankilish, citing the presence of pro-Muhammad Amin Hatuqays in the region. Located in a bend of the Belaya River and surrounded by forest, the village was fortified with double-row barricades. Hatuqay defenders at the village believed the Russian military was depleted by deployments to the Georgian and Crimean fronts of the Crimean War. Capitalizing on this, Major General Evdokimov utilized rainy and overcast weather between October 17–18, 1854, to conduct an undetected, off-road march. His forces hid in a large forest before crossing the Belaya River 5 versts (approximately 5.3 km) upstream from the village, which was situated about 30 versts (approximately 32 km) downstream from the Belorechenskoye fortification. On October 19, Russian troops executed a surprise attack, scaling the barricades and engaging the defenders in hand-to-hand combat. The Russian forces subsequently burned the entire village and its supplies. Up to 200 Circassians living in the village were killed or wounded during the attack. The dead included the village's prince, Atajuq Jan-Klychqo, as well as Batyrey Doghuzhiy, and the son of the local religious scholar. Among the wounded were Prince Indar Cherchanuqo and Kaplan-Girey, whom Russian sources identified as a primary instigator of the Hatuqay resistance. On the Russian side, casualties included the death of Major Gertsyk, commander of the 1st battalion of the Stavropol Jaeger Regiment, as well as one sub-officer and seven lower ranks, with 48 personnel wounded. The Russian forces also lost 26 horses killed and 17 wounded. Following the capture and destruction of the village on October 19, General Evdokimov initiated a scorched-earth campaign in Hatuqay lands from October 20 to 21. Cavalry columns swept along the Belaya and Danzhyu rivers over a 10-verst area, systematically burning massive supplies of hay, grain, and winter provisions. The explicit military objective was to destroy the agricultural livelihood of the lower Belaya River population. During these sweeps, troops also burned down the Hatuqay village of Khanyche-Khabl. The events of the 19th-century conflicts had a lasting impact on Hatuqay cultural memory. Mournful folk songs, specifically "ЦутхьакIумэкъо Къамболэт игъыбз" and "Цужъкъуапэ игъыбз", were dedicated to the death of Kambolet Chutkhakumov, who died defending Hatuqay lands in 1854. His family later went extinct.

Following the attack, the remains of Hatuqay were fully subjugated and put under Russian control. In 1862, specific governance structure was proposed for each of the Circassian sub-ethnic groups, consisting of a Waliy ('administrator') and a Qadi ('spiritual administrator'), to aid whom were appointed Naibs, village elders in each village, and murtazaks (who performed police functions). The Hatuqays, for their part, elected as ruler: Cherchanuqo Indar; as qadi; Hadji Mussa, as naibs: Shakhoz Kunzharov and Adzhigoy Khanokov. In 1863, the Russian military administration dissolved the principality as a distinct entity in the Caucasus. The surviving Hatuqay were divided into small groups and forcibly resettled into large villages created for the Bzhedug. The Hatuqay population was dispersed, the principality effectively disappeared from the map.

== Geography ==
The Hatuqay maintained control over fertile lowlands and crucial trade routes in the northwestern Caucasus. Hatuqay was originally located near the Black Sea coast, around the Taman peninsula, near the Khabanets River neighboring Shapsugs, as well as the southern banks of the Kuban, a little further down from where the Afips (Афыпс) river flows. However, in the late 18th century, the Hatuqay Principality was relocated in the territory situated between the Belaya (Шъхьагуащэ) and Pshish (Пщыщ) rivers, flanked by the Bzhedug and Chemguy principalities.

== Society ==
The Hatuqays had a strong army and were known for their warlike character. They were notorious for their incessant wars against other Circassians. In addition to wars against other Circassians, they actively participated in wars against the Crimean Tatars. They had, according to Tatar writers, abundance of food supplies enough to feed a multi-thousand-strong army for more than a month. Of the grain crops, wheat, millet, and barley were grown. Horse breeding underwent significant development.

As per Adyghe Khabze, the Hatuqay viewed engaging in commerce, merchant activities, or trade as a deeply humiliating and degrading occupation "beneath their dignity", as a prince was expected to be a "vessel of nobility" whose status was maintained and proven through military adventures, war, and cattle-rustling, rather than through peaceful commercial transactions. For this region, they hosted a large number of Cherkesogai to serve as a merchant class.

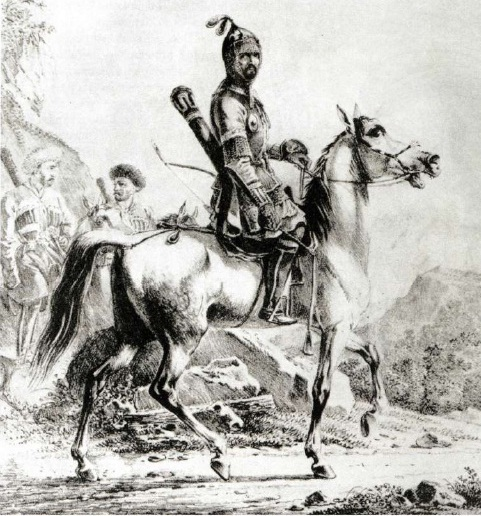
A Circassian knight drawn by Aleksander Orłowski

Circassian principalities, including the Hatuqay principality, had a strict aristocratic structure based on unwritten customary law (Adyghe Khabze). Each princely family kept four first-rank noble families (tlekotlesh) by their side in tradition. Princes (pshi) held the highest position in society. They ruled the population, commanded the military, and led the knight classes (worq). They distributed the loots to keep the knights loyal. They also gave these knights institutional gifts (worq tin) consisting of horses, weapons, armor, and servants.

A prince did not hold absolute power. His authority depended on his bravery in battle, his eloquence, and his generosity. Princes were required to protect their subjects from outsider threats. A prince who failed to provide protection could lose his subjects to other princes. The prince and high-ranking nobles made major decisions in assemblies called Khase. These assemblies gathered to decide on matters of war, peace, and military campaigns.

Knights formed the military power of the principalities. They followed their specific prince during wartime under a system of mutual loyalty and protection. They served as elite units and fought as armored cavalry. Free peasants (feqotl) provided production and sustained the economy.

The lower classes consisted of slaves and servants, who had their own sub-classes. Most slaves were prisoners of war. Social rules protected these people from the cruelty of their masters. Once purchased, they actually gained rights to property and safety.

=== Religion ===
The Circassians were Christianized between the 3rd and 5th centuries AD under the influence of the Byzantines and Georgians. However, Christianity was not fully entrenched among the Circassians, having mixed with the local pagan religion, resulting in a semi-pagan, semi-Christian faith. With the start of the Russo-Circassian War, Christianity began to be seen as the Russian religion among the Circassians, and the remaining Christians gradually converted. Consequently, Christianity faced severe reactions among the populace. The Hatuqays were one of the first Circassian societies to embrace Islam, in the 17th century. Islam entered Circassian culture not directly, but through stories and folk tales: ceremonies celebrating the birth of the Islamic prophet Muhammad played a key role, and a new genre of Circassian epic literature connected with his birth celebrations emerged: "Mewlid". Evliya Çelebi, who visited Hatuqay in the 1660s, notes that the people chanted "la ilahe illallah" (There is no god but Allah), but they failed to fully grasp Islam and continued their old traditions.

== List of Rulers ==
Title	Ruler	Circassian name	Period	Notes
Prince (Пщы)	Hatuqo, son of Chemrug	Кӏэмрыгу ыкъо Хьатыкъо	c. 1330s	Founder of the principality, son of Chemrug and brother of Prince Boletoqo (Adyghe: Болэтыкъо), the first prince of the Chemguy Principality.
Prince (Пщы)	Hatuqoqoshkho ("Great son of Hatuqo")	Хьатыкъокъошхо	c. late 14th century	Son of Hatuqo and father of Biberd and Indar.
Prince (Пщы)	Biberd, son of Hatuqoqoshkho	Хьатыкъокъошхо ыкъо Бибэрд	c. late 14th or early 15th century	Son of Hatuqoqoshkho. Subsequent Hatuqay princes came from Biberd's line, not his brother Indar.
Prince (Пщы)	"Pale"	Шъуагъо	c. 1532	Looted Astrakhan in alliance with the Kabardians.
Prince (Пщы)	Janbech	Джанбэч	c. 16th century	Father of Aledjuq and Antenuq.
Prince (Пщы)	Aledjuq, son of Janbech	Джанбэч ыкъо Алэджыкъу	c. 16th century (mentioned 1551)	He ruled during a period of conflict between the Chemguys and the Bzhedugs. Aledjuq allied with the Chemguy prince Tumenish. In the battle where Tumenish was killed, Aledjuq took command, rallying the confused troops to defeat the Bzhedugs. Along with his brother Antenuq, he asserted Hatuqay's independence and challenged the Crimean Khan: the Circassians, led by him, attacked Azov in 1551. This led to war. Yet, the Hatuqay principality led by Prince Aledjuq took part in the Ottoman–Safavid War (1578–1590) on the side of the Ottoman Empire and the Crimean Khanate.
Prince (Пщы)	Jandjeriy	Джанджэрый	c. 1664	Mentioned by Evliya Çelebi; he is described as wealthy and a friend of the Tatars.
Prince (Пщы)	Deway Pshikhafe	Дэуай Пщыхафэ	c. 1774	A prince of the Hatuqay mentioned in Circassian oral history, in the corpus - "Kochas Khatkhe". When he lived unclear, but the events are dated to 1774 by scholar Ali Skhalyakho.
Prince (Пщы)	Hapach	ХьэпакI	c. 18th century	Under his rule, relations with the Bzhedugs improved significantly; his daughter was betrothed to the Bzhedug prince Batdjeriy. Relations with the Chemguys deteriorated. During his time, the Hatuqays lived near the modern stanitsa of Severnaya.
Head (Пащэ) Prince (Пщы)	Jandjeriy, son of Hapach Aslandjeriy Cherchanuqo, son of Kerim	ХьэпакI ыкъо Джанджэрый Чэрчаныкъо Чэрым ыкъо Аслъанджэрый	c. 1796 until c. 1827	According to Sultan Khan-Giray, Aslandjeriy is credited with restoring the principality's status, reportedly "forcing even the strongest neighboring societies to respect the Hatuqay." Emancipated slaves on his deathbed. He inherited the title when he was still a child, and was a boy for much of his reign. However, ethnographer and historian Leonid Lavrov records another person who "stood at the head of" Hatuqay in 1796: Jandjeriy, son of Hapach (ХьэпакI ыкъо Джанджэрый). Whether they are the same person or Jandjeriy was a regent for Aslandjeriy is uncertain. According to oral history recorded by Lavrov, he led the Hatuqay during the Shapsug-Bzhedug War. Following this war, he migrated the Hatuqay people east of the modern Ryazanskaya stanitsa, settling between the Pshish and Belaya rivers. Later, the Hatuqay moved to Bgyezho on the right bank of the Belaya River.
Prince (Пщы)	Jandjeriy Cherchanuqo, son of Aslandjeriy	Чэрчаныкъо Аслъанджэрый ыкъо Джанджэрый	c. 1827 - c. 1851	Mentioned in Ottoman documents around 1827. Fought against Russia despite swearing oath. Submitted to Muhammad Amin Asiyalav in the 1840s, and in 1851 even briefly relocated to his territory to better fight Russia, but eventually returned to original lands. Last mentioned in around 1851. He is not mentioned in a 1852 document listing Hatuqay princes.
Prince (Пщы) People's Administrator (Лъэпкъ Уэлий)	Indar Cherchanuqo	Чэрчаныкъо Индар	c. 1852 - 1862 1862 - 1863	Mentioned in a 1852 document as "Yandarze", the Hatuqay prince with most possessions. In 1862, specific governance structure was proposed for each of the Circassian sub-ethnic groups, consisting of a Waliy ('people's administrator') and a Qadi ('spiritual administrator'), to aid whom were appointed Naibs, village elders in each village, and murtazaks (who performed police functions). The Hatuqays, for their part, elected as ruler: Indar Kerkenokov; qadi; Hadji Mussa, naibs: Shakhoz Kunzharov and Adzhigoy Khanokov.
