= Jandjeriy Cherchanuqo (19th century) =

Circassian noble and politician

- Чэрчаныкъо Джанджэрый
- The seal of Jandjeriy Cherchanuqo

Prince of Hatuqay
- In office c. 1827–c. 1851
- Preceded by: Aslandjeriy Cherchanuqo
- Succeeded by: Indar Cherchanuqo

Personal details
- Born: Hatuqay, Circassia
- Died: Late 19th century Hatuqay, Circassia
- Parent: Aslandjeriy Cherchanuqo
- Religion: Sunni Islam
- House: House of Hatuqo; Cherchanuqo

Military service
- Allegiance: Circassian Confederation: Principality of Hatuqay
- Battles/wars: Russo-Circassian War

Jandjeriy Cherchanuqo (Note: Adyghe: Чэрчаныкъо Джанджэрый, Russian: Дянчерие/Джан-Гирей Керкануков, Turkish: Cangirey Bek) was a Circassian politician and ruling prince of the Principality of Hatuqay in the 19th century. He led the Hatuqay during the Russo-Circassian War. Jandjeriy gave nominal allegiance to both the Ottoman Empire and the Russian Empire at the same time; and kept secretly assisting the Circassians against Russia, later fighting them outright, together with prince Bezruqo of Chemguy. He was an ally of Muhammad Amin and thus Imam Shamil. He is also mentioned in Ottoman archives as "Cangirey-bek".

== Info ==
Jandjeriy was born into the Hatuqo family of the Cherchanuqo branch of the Hatuqay princes. The Hatuqay nobility traced their lineage to Prince Hatuqo, the younger brother of Boletoqo (progenitor of the Chemguy princes). The dynasty later adopted the surname Cherchanuqo from a descendant of Hatuqo. His father was Prince Aslandjeriy, who was known as a hero for the Hatuqays.

He is mentioned in Ottoman documents around 1827: in a document signed and sealed by Prince Jandjeriy, the Hatuqay sent a reassurance document to the Ottoman government, stating that they will stay loyal to the Ottoman Caliphate. One year later, in 1828, they gave a similar oath to the Russia Empire; but this was nominal as they continued fighting against them in reality. In the 1840s, the Hatuqay accepted the authority of Muhammad Amin, the representative of Imam Shamil in the Northwest Caucasus, and pledged to continue the jihad war against Russia.

In 1851, the Hatuqay led by prince Jandjeriy briefly relocated to Muhammad Amin's territory to better fight Russia, following the orders of Muhammad Amin. In June of that year, Prince Jandjeriy contacted Russian General Zavodovsky, who was "infamous among the Russians for his good-nature", proposing ceasefire in return for his people being spared from Russian attacks. Escorted by a column led by Colonel Pullo, the Hatuqay traveled to the Laba River, where Jandjeriy halted the group and demanded a guarantee of protection from Russian forces. General Zavodovsky agreed to these demands, a decision that conflicted with the intentions of his superiors, who wanted the area cleared of Circassians. Thus, the Hatuqay returned to their original lands, with promises of a ceasefire. By next year, the next prince of Hatuqay, Indar Cherchanuqo, even had a nominal rank in the Russian military. However, in October 1854, Major General Evdokimov attacked a Hatuqay village called Jankilish, citing the presence of pro-Muhammad Amin Hatuqays in the region. Located in a bend of the Belaya River and surrounded by forest, the village was fortified with double-row barricades. On October 19, Russian troops executed a surprise attack, scaling the barricades and engaging the defenders in hand-to-hand combat. The Russian forces subsequently burned the entire village and its supplies. Up to 200 Circassians living in the village were killed or wounded during the attack. The dead included the village's prince, Atajuq Jan-Klychqo, as well as Batyrey Doghuzhiy, and the son of the local religious scholar. Among the wounded were Prince Indar Cherchanuqo and Kaplan-Girey, whom Russian sources identified as a primary instigator of the Hatuqay resistance.

== See also ==
- Hatuqay
- Circassians
