= Hapach of Hatuqay =

Circassian noble and politician

- Хьатыкъо ХьэпакI

Prince of Hatuqay
- In office ? – late 18th century
- Succeeded by: Jandjeriy, son of Hapach

Personal details
- Born: Hatuqay, Circassia
- Died: Hatuqay, Circassia
- Children: Jandjeriy, son of Hapach
- Religion: Sunni Islam
- House: House of Hatuqo
- Burial: Hepache yiqoth, Severskaya

Military service
- Allegiance: Circassian Confederation: Principality of Hatuqay

Hapach of Hatuqay (Note: Adyghe: ХьэпакI, Russian: Хапач) was a Circassian politician and a ruling prince of the Principality of Hatuqay in the 18th century.

== Info ==
Hapach was born into the ruling family of the Hatuqay. The Hatuqay were ruled by the Hatuqo family of the Hatuqay princes. The Hatuqay nobility traced their lineage to Prince Hatuqo, the younger brother of Boletoqo (progenitor of the Chemguy princes). The Principality of Hatuqay had a strong army and was one of the most warlike of Circassian principalities, known for its princes who were engaged in ceaseless internal wars against other Circassians; in addition to wars against other Circassians, they actively participated in wars against the Crimean Tatars. They had, according to Tatar writers, abundance of food supplies enough to feed a multi-thousand-strong army for more than a month. Of the grain crops, wheat, millet, and barley were grown. Horse breeding underwent significant development. In the mid 18th century, the Hatuqay were ruled by prince Hapach. Under his rule, relations with the Bzhedugs, previously sour since the time of Aledjuq of Hatuqay, improved significantly; his daughter was betrothed to the Bzhedug prince Batcheriy. Relations with the Chemguys deteriorated. During his time, the Hatuqays lived near the modern stanitsa of Severnaya.

According to Russian sources, Hapach had a strained relationship with the Chemguy prince Boletoqo, due to a hunting incident. This specific story has been recorded about Hapach, during a hunt with Boletoqo, the prince of Chemguy:

One day, Boletoqo went hunting and on his way met the Hatuqay prince, Hapach. They agreed to hunt together. A wild boar they had wounded ran out into a clearing and stood under the trunk of a bent tree. No one risked approaching the beast. Only one Chemguy peasant bravely ran up and, with a powerful blow of his saber, chopped it in half from forehead to tail. Boletoqo grew angry and began to scold the peasant: 'How dare you, scoundrel, in the presence of princes, take away their honor of killing the boar themselves? Or do you think that no one but you could have done this?' Hapach did not like this, and he said to Boletoqo: 'Why are you scolding a brave peasant? Or do you think that a prince is permitted to do anything he wants? Today you are a prince, but tomorrow you might find yourself just another peasant.

A burial site located in the Severskaya stanitsa region, former territory of Hatuqay, is named the "holy grave of Hapach" (Adyghe: Хьэпакӏэ икъотхь; Hepache yiqoth).

== See also ==
- Hatuqay
- Circassians
