= Aslandjeriy Cherchanuqo =

- Чэрчаныкъо Аслъанджэрый
- Tamga of the ruling Cherchanuqo dynasty

Prince of Hatuqay
- In office Late 18th century – Early 19th century (before 1828)
- Preceded by: Hapach of Hatuqay
- Succeeded by: Cherchanuqo Jandjeriy (Dyancherey, Cangirey-bek)

Personal details
- Born: 18th century Hatuqay, Circassia
- Died: Early 19th century (before 1828) Hatuqay, Circassia
- Children: Cherchanuqo Jandjeriy; Cherchanuqo Alejuqo
- House: House of Hatuqo; Cherchanuqo
- Religion: Sunni Islam

Military service
- Allegiance: Circassian Confederation: Principality of Hatuqay

Aslandjeriy Cherchanuqo (Note: Adyghe: Чэрчаныкъо Аслъанджэрый, Russian: Аслан-Гирей Керкануков, Turkish: Aslan-Girey Bey) was a Circassian politician and ruling prince of the Principality of Hatuqay in the early 19th century. His reign was considered the golden age of the Hatuqay, a period when the principality reached its political and social zenith before its eventual decline. According to the 19th-century Circassian historian and ethnographer Sultan Khan-Giray, Aslandjeriy was remembered in oral history as a "wild hero" and an "unforgettable" leader, noted for his extraordinary oratory skills and his controversial deathbed decision to emancipate all Hatuqay serfs. He was credited with restoring the principality's status, "forcing even the strongest neighboring Circassians to respect the Hatuqay", according to Khan-Giray.

== Biography ==
=== Family and background ===
Aslandjeriy was born into the Hatuqo family of the Cherchanuqo branch of the Hatuqay princes. The Hatuqay nobility traced their lineage to Prince Hatuqo, the younger brother of Boletoqo (progenitor of the Chemguy princes). The dynasty later adopted the surname Cherchanuqo from a descendant of Hatuqo.

Historically, the Hatuqay were one of the most powerful and large principalities in Circassia, originally inhabiting the Taman peninsula and later the southern banks of the Kuban River near the confluence of the Afips river. They had a strong army and was one of the most warlike of Circassian principalities, known for its princes who were engaged in ceaseless internal wars against other Circassians. However, by the time of Aslandjeriy's birth, the principality had weakened due to internecine wars, disease, and the secession of the Kheghache Principality.

=== Early reign ===
Aslandjeriy inherited the title of prince while still a minor, sometime during or before the 1780s. Following his predecessor's death, the domain fell into a state of "anarchy," and neighboring enemies sought to dismantle the Hatuqay state by taking advantage of the heir's youth.

Contemporaries described the boy-ruler as physically weak, noting that he was unable to control a spirited warhorse and instead rode a gentle steed while touring his lands to demand fealty. Despite his physical frailty, he established authority through force of character. In a noted anecdote, when a nobleman acted rowdily in his presence, the young Aslandjeriy struck his own horse and exclaimed:

If you act like a foal, and I act like a child, then who is to govern the Hatuqay?

—

Aslandjeriy was known for his oratory skills. It was a custom among the neighboring Chemguy princes to never speak directly during negotiations or disputes, instead using noble proxies to argue their cases to preserve dignity and prevent emotional outbursts. During a forest assembly, the young Aslandjeriy became dissatisfied with his proxy's defense of Hatuqay interests. Breaking custom, he interrupted the envoy, stepped onto the stump of a felled tree, and delivered a speech himself. Khan-Giray writes that he "defended his rights with such force of eloquence, and with such fidelity and perfect knowledge of the matter, that he achieved the desired success in everything."

As an adult, Aslandjeriy successfully consolidated power. Under his rule, the Hatuqay were described as "flourishing" compared to the destitution of later years. He fought with Abazins, who "repedeately attacked him", to the point he was considered "longtime enemies" of the Abazins.

=== "Jandjeriy" ===
Ethnographer and historian Leonid Lavrov recorded oral histories which name another name who "stood at the head of" Hatuqay in 1796: Jandjeriy, son of Hapach (ХьэпакI ыкъо Джанджэрый). Whether they are the same person or Jandjeriy was a regent for Aslandjeriy is uncertain. According to oral history recorded by Lavrov, he led the Hatuqay during the Shapsug-Bzhedug War. Prince Batcheriy of the Bzhedugs invited Jandjeriy to join the expedition against the Shapsug; Jandjeriy declined and stated that the Hatuqay had no grievances with the Shapsug. When Shapsug delegates later requested the Hatuqays' help against the Bzhedug, he refused them also, saying the Hatuqay have no grievances with the Bzhedug. Following this war, he migrated the Hatuqay people east of the modern Ryazanskaya stanitsa, settling between the Pshish and Belaya rivers. Later, the people moved to Bgyezho on the right bank of the Belaya River. According to Lavrov, Jandjeriy's father was prince Hapach of Hatuqay, who was credited with improving relations with the Bzhedugs; Hapach's daughter was betrothed to the Bzhedug prince Batdjeriy. During his time, the Hatuqays lived near the modern stanitsa of Severnaya. Before Hapach, Hatuqays had a sour relationship with the Bzhedugs due to the policies of prince Aledjuq of Hatuqay.

=== Death ===
On his deathbed, Aslandjeriy was approached by the noble elders regarding his will. It was customary to release specific families of serfs upon a prince's death as a religious act, in accordance with Islam. When asked which families should be manumitted, Aslandjeriy replied that "all Hatuqay are free." Following this, Hatuqay slaves were freed. Khan-Giray interprets this final decree not merely as an act of emancipation, but also a warning that the Hatuqay were too independent to be governed effectively. Following his death, the principality split into two warring factions.

He was succeeded by his son, Cherchanuqo Jandjeriy (also known as Dyancherey or Jan-Girey), who was the ruling prince during the 19th century and led the Hatuqay during the Russo-Circassian War. Jandjeriy gave nominal allegiance to Russia but fought them in reality, together with prince Bezruqo of Chemguy. He was an ally of Muhammad Amin. He is also mentioned in Ottoman archives as "Cangirey-bek". Aslandjeriy had another confirmed son, Alejuqo.

=== Date of his reign ===
An Ottoman document lists him as one of the Hatuqay princes in the 1780s. Russian military documents record him as the "Hatuqay Circassian prince Aslan-Girey" ruling territory beyond the Kuban in May 1795. By August 1795, he was reported to be seeking refuge on the Russian side of the Kuban due to pressure from the Abazins.

In some Russian documents, Hatuqay is listed as the "domain of prince Aslan-Girey". He was again named in 1807 by Julius von Klarapoth as the "chief prince" of Hatuqay. In a book published in 1823, he is named as the senior prince of Hatuqay. But by 1828, his son had already taken over.

== See also ==
- Hatuqay
- Circassians
- Sultan Khan-Giray
