= Gogotl =

Gogotl Гоготль
- Selo
- Location within Republic of Dagestan Location within Russia
- Coordinates: 42°29′N 46°44′E
- Country: Russia
- Region: Republic of Dagestan
- District: Shamilsky District
- Time zone: UTC+3:00

Gogotl (Russian: Гоготль) is a rural locality (a selo) in Shamilsky District, Republic of Dagestan, Russia. Population: 530 (2021 census); 476 (2002 census); 325 (1989 Soviet census). There are 33 streets in this selo.

== Geography ==
Selo is located 18 km from Khebda (the district's administrative centre), 83 km from Makhachkala (capital of Dagestan) and 1,658 km from Moscow. Gonoda is the nearest rural locality.
