= Hatuqay =

Circassian tribe

Хьатыкъуай, Хьатыкъое
- A tamga of the Cherchanuqo dynasty which ruled the Hatuqay princedom (left). The Circassian flag (right)

Regions with significant populations
- Mainly: Turkey (Pınarbaşı, Bozüyük, Bolu, Hendek) Small populations: Syria (Quneitra, Homs); Israel (Kfar Kama); Jordan

Languages
- Adyghe (Hatuqay dialect), Turkish, Arabic, Hebrew

Religion
- Sunni Islam (Hanafi)

Related ethnic groups
- Other Adyghe tribes

The Hatuqay (Note: /ˈhɑːtʊkwaɪ/; Spelled variously as Hatukay, Hatıkuay, Hatkoy, Hatuqway, Hadugoy, Hadgoy, Khatukay, etc; Adyghe: Хьатыкъуай, [ħaːtɘqʷaːj]; Turkish: Hatukay; Arabic: حتوقاي; Russian: Хатукай) are one of the twelve major Circassian tribes. Their ancestral tongue is the Hatuqay dialect of the Adyghe language. One of the twelve stars on the Circassian flag represents the Hatuqay. Historically, they lived in the Hatuqay Principality of Circassia and were known for their martial character. Historically one of the largest Circassian tribes, the Hatuqay are now very few in number, and most of them live in Turkey; a result of the Circassian genocide in the 19th century, which saw the majority of the Hatuqay killed or deported to the Ottoman Empire, resulting in their extinction in their homeland. Hatuqay was marked on period maps with various names (Hatukai, Codioci, Gatyukai), including the 1787 map by Johann Anton Güldenstädt and the 1675 map by Frederik de Wit.

== Distribution ==
The Hatuqay tribe was originally located near the Black Sea coast, around the Taman peninsula, as well as the southern banks of the Kuban, a little further down from where the Afips (Афыпс) river flows. However, in the late 18th century, the Hatuqay Principality was relocated west of the Temirgoys, in the territory situated between the Belaya (Шъхьагуащэ) and Pshish (Пщыщ) rivers.

Today, nearly all Hatuqays live in the diaspora. There is a small community in Adygea, but they speak the Temirgoy dialect. In Turkey, there are approximately 20 Hatuqay villages in Kayseri's Pınarbaşı district, mainly in the Çörümşek valley, as well as in Bozüyük, Bolu and Sakarya. Hatuqays also live in Syria, especially in the Homs district and Quneitra in the Golan heights. Some Hatuqays from Syria repatriated to Karachay-Cherkessia during the Syrian civil war. There are also some Hatuqay families in Israel, particularly in Kfar Kama; but they speak the Shapsug dialect. In Jordan, head of the General Intelligence Department, Ahmad Husni Hatoqay, was a Hatuqay Circassian.

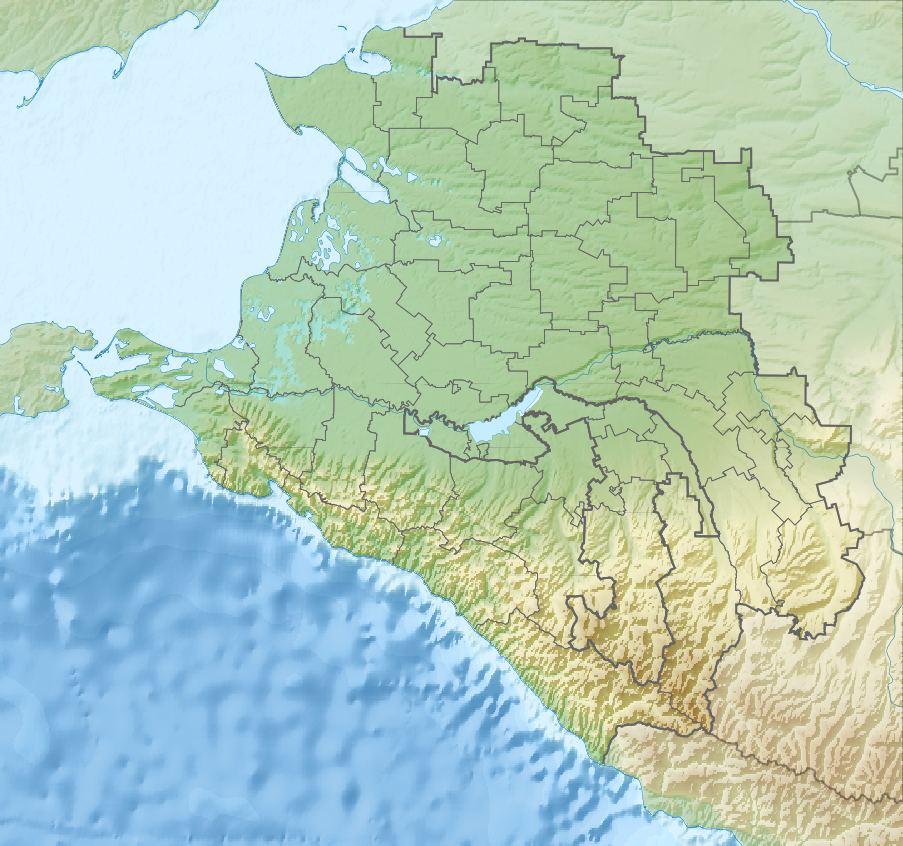
Approximate location of Circassian princedoms, Tsutsiev's Atlas

== Language ==
The Hatuqay speak the Hatuqay dialect of Adyghe. Hatuqay is classified as one of the "Steppe dialects", a subgroup of that also includes the Temirgoy, Abzakh and Bzhedug dialects, although it also shares many grammatical and phonological features with the "Coastal Dialects" of Shapsug and Natukhaj. Thus, it can be considered an "in-between" dialect. Although a dialect of Western Circassian (Adyghe), it is considered the closest among the Western dialects to Eastern Circassian. This may be due to frequent interaction with Kabardians in Kayseri, as Hatuqays are a minority among the majority Kabardians.

== Religion ==
The Hatuqays are Sunni Muslims. They were one of the first Circassian tribes to embrace Islam. Islam entered Circassian culture not directly, but through stories and folk tales: ceremonies celebrating the birth of the Islamic prophet Muhammad played a key role, and a new genre of Circassian epic literature connected with his birth celebrations emerged: "Mewlid". Evliya Çelebi, who visited Hatuqay in the late 1600s, wrote that mosques existed in the villages and that the people chanted "la ilahe illallah" (There is no god but Allah), but they failed to fully grasp Islam and continued their old traditions.

== History ==
Almost all knowledge about the founding of the Hatuqay Principality and tribe comes from oral history. According to these oral accounts, the founding dynasty of the Hatuqay Principality descends from king Inal: Prince Hatuqo was the grandson of Inal, son of Chemrug and brother of Prince Boletoqo (Adyghe: Болэтыкъо), the first prince of the Chemguy Principality. In the period following Inal's death, the Chemguy Principality was divided into two principalities. One became the land of Prince Boletoqo, and the other, Prince Hatuqo. The elder brother, Prince Boletoqo, remained in his principality in the region between the Greater Laba and Shkhakoshem rivers, retaining the name Chemguy. Prince Hatuqo, however, moved west and established the new principality of Hatuqay.

A legend describes the separation of the tribes: The Chemguy and Hatuqay were originally one people ruled by three brothers: Boletoqo, Zan, and Hatuqo. The twins Boletoqo and Hatuqo, as infants, were sleeping in the same bed covered by a single fur cloth. In the morning, the cloth was found torn in two, leading their mother to shriek, "Woe unto you, Chemirgoy! They have torn you asunder!". The brothers lived in peace until the younger two, Zan and Hatuqo, decided to separate from the eldest, Boletoqo. Prince Boletoqo punished the separatists by stripping them of their property. Hatuqo, tiring of his brother's authority, took his subjects and migrated west to establish a new principality.

The Hatuqay tribe was originally located near the Black Sea coast, around the Taman peninsula, as well as the southern banks of the Kuban, a little further down from where the Afips (Афыпс) river flows. However, in the late 18th century, the Hatuqay Principality was relocated west of the Temirgoys, in the territory situated between the Belaya (Шъхьагуащэ) and Pshish (Пщыщ) rivers. The Hatuqay absorbed the Sobay, a large Circassian tribe that lived on the Belaya River. The Hatuqay nobles living in the large aul of Sobay were known as Sobe-pshi (Princes of Sobay).

The Hatuqays had a strong army and were known for their warlike character. They were notorious for their incessant wars against other Circassians. They also participated in wars against the Crimean Tatars. One of the Hatuqay princes, nicknamed "The Pale," looted Astrakhan in alliance with the Kabardians.

Turkish explorer Evliya Çelebi compiled the oldest detailed description of the Hatuqay tribe, he wrote:

The Great Province of Hatuqay. Its prince is named Jangirey, that is, Janbe Giray. When Janbe Giray Sultan was a guest there, a child was born to the prince that very night; thus, they named him Jangirey after Janbe Giray Sultan. To this day, Circassian traditions are such that if a son is born while a guest is in the house, they name him after the guest. At that very moment, a wet nurse takes the boy away to another place. She feeds and raises him even better than his own mother and father could. We observed that this is still the case. If there is no guest in the house, they give the boy the name of a neighbor; this is their ancient custom. This Hatuqay prince is wealthy, possessing many livestock and 8,000 fully armed soldiers. Because this province is a vast, fertile, and beautiful homeland, the Nevruz Mirza Tatars—who fled the Muscovite King after he killed his son, fighting their way through the Kalmyk infidels, crossing the Volga River and the Heyhat Plains—have settled here on the banks of the Kuban River in Hatuqay Circassian territory. They became kin. In total, they number 10,000 soldiers and 6,000 tents. They are exceedingly skilled with quivers, silver-inlaid gear, and weapons, and are valiant soldiers.

If you were to call this Circassian tribe "infidels," they would grant you neither mercy nor time, but would kill you on the spot. Furthermore, they say "La ilahe illallah" (There is no god but God), yet they eat fat pigs starting from the tail; they do not fast or perform the daily prayers, and they do not allow anyone who does not own a pig into the village. They have absolutely no churches, bazaars, markets, inns, or bathhouses. All travelers and passersby stay in private homes. If you are a guest in a house and leave your goods and property out in the open, not a single scrap will be harmed. Even if you were their enemy, the host and his neighbors would die for your sake. They would not let any harm come to you.

This Circassian language, even now, cannot be written down; it is a language based on listening, produced from the throat, cheeks, and under the tongue, a sound that is like a sparrow's chirp and cannot be committed to paper. This humble servant of God, a traveler of the world and companion to man, the unpretentious Evliya, has traveled for 51 years, setting foot in 18 kingdoms across seven climes, and has written down 147 languages with my gem-scattering pen, including their eloquence, rhetoric, and poems, in order to converse with the people of every region. But I could not write down this Circassian language with its magpie-like sound. By the will of God, we will try to write this language as best as we can. They have a peculiar dialect, for they are not literate. That is why it cannot be committed to paper; it is a bird's language, and that is that.

— Evliya Çelebi, the Seyahatnâme

The Hatuqay maintained control over fertile lowlands and crucial trade routes in the northwestern Caucasus, resisting both Tatar incursions and Ottoman-backed pressure. Tensions escalated throughout the 1540s as the Hatuqay leadership increasingly resisted demands for tribute and subordination and sought alliances. Hatuqay princes Elok and Antenuk were involved in these acts. The region faced difficulty with the Crimean campaign in Hatuqay (1551), as the Crimean Tatars defeated the army of the Hatuqay and ravaged the Bzhedug lands. Sahib Giray had inflicted severe blows on almost all major principalities of Circassia: Zhaney, Hatuqay, Bzhedug, Kabardia. It is after this that the Circassians started to seek alliances with Russia to fight against Tatar incursions.

Some historians suggested that the Khegayk tribe was separated from the Hatuqays. The word "Khegayk" means "breakaways". According to Amjad Jaimoukha, it was the Hakuch tribe who split from Hatuqays, which contributed to the weakening of the tribe. In addition, Hatuqay and Hytuk may refer to the same tribe.

One of the most famous Hatuqay princes was Aslandjeriy (Adyghe: Аслъанджэрый), known for his character and oratorical skill despite being physically weak. The Hatuqay Principality reached its zenith during Aslandjeriy's reign. On his deathbed, surrounded by elders and nobles, Aslandjeriy's will stipulated that every slave in the Hatuqay Principality be freed according to Islamic obligations, and that no Hatuqay would be a slave thereafter. Following this, slave families in the Hatuqay region were emancipated. Hatuqay, which used to be an important Circassian principality of West Circassia, lost this status with Aslandjeriy's death, as the Hatukay Principality split into two warring factions.

By the first quarter of the 18th century, the population of the Hatuqay principality had sharply declined. In the early 19th century, their numbers were further reduced by a plague epidemic. In the 1840s, the Hatuqay submit to Muhammad Amin, the third Naib of Imam Shamil in the Northwest Caucasus. In 1863, the Russian military administration dissolved the tribe as a distinct entity in the Caucasus. The surviving Hatuqay were divided into small groups and forcibly resettled into large auls created for the Bzhedug tribe. The Hatuqay population was dispersed, the tribe effectively disappeared from the map.

== Etymology ==
The name is believed to derive from Prince Hatuqo (Adyghe: Хьатыкъо), who, according to traditional Circassian genealogies, was the founder of the Hatuqay principality, and a prince descended from King Inal.

The name has been the subject of a folk etymology, which explains it as referring to the Hittites ('Son of Hittite'). A study about Circassians in Kayseri found that local Circassians frequently claimed descent from the Hittites. The etymology of Hattusa, capital of the Hittite Empire, is explained with Circassian хьэтӏу (two dogs) + щхьэ (head), which supposedly refers to the two sphinx statues guarding the gate of Hattusa. Some connected the Circassians with the Hattians rather than Hittites; and some authors explained the etymology of "Hatuqay" as "Hatti-Son". The Adyghe Encyclopedia published in Russia compares Hattian mythology and Nart sagas, including stories found in the Hatuqay Nart corpus. The Hittites spoke an Indo-European language, however the possibility of Hattians speaking a Northwest Caucasian language related to Circassian has been considered by linguists, although this is unconfirmed.

== Settlements ==
Below are some of the Hatuqay settlements, or non-Hatuqay Circassian settlements where some Hatuqay families live.

Location	Adyghe name(s)	Official name
Bilecik, Turkey	Хьатыкъуае; Хьатыкъуайхьаблэ; Хьанапщэхьаблэ	Poyra
Bilecik, Turkey	Чэпнэ; Хьанапщэхьаблэ	Yeniçepni
Bolu, Turkey	Пэциехьаблэ; Пэдисэй	Elmalık
Kayseri, Turkey	Пэдысыешху	Akören
Kayseri, Turkey	Хъытхьаблэ; Хъытякъуэй	Aygörmez
Kayseri, Turkey	Чэчэнай	Beserek
Kayseri, Turkey	Индырэ	Burhaniye
Kayseri, Turkey	Ныбэрнэкъохьаблэ; Ныбэрынхьаблэ; Ныбэрнэкъуай	Cinliören
Kayseri, Turkey	Хьаджэсхьакъуэй; Хьаджыисхьакъ	Demirciören
Kayseri, Turkey	Пэдысыежъый	Devederesi
Kayseri, Turkey	Хэусай	İnliören
Kayseri, Turkey	Лыпыйхьаблэ	Kavak
Kayseri, Turkey	Къайнар	Kaynar
Kayseri, Turkey	Кучы	Kuşçu
Kayseri, Turkey	Балкъочэй	Malak
Kayseri, Turkey	?	Söğütlü
Kayseri, Turkey	Лакъхьаблэ	Tersakan
Kfar Kama, Israel (3 families)	Кфар Кама	Kfar Kama
Sakarya, Turkey	Хъанхабьлэ	Kargalıhanbaba

Below are some of the Hatuqay clans.

Adyghe name	Russian name
Анзауыр	—
Анцок	—
Балкъо	—
Бжегокъо	—
Борэн	—
Брыдж	Бриджов
Бэрзэдж	Берзеков
Бзадж	Бзаджов
ГъучӀэжъ	—
ГъучӀэпщыкъо	—
Гусар	—
Даур	—
Дахъун	—
Джэгъащт	—
Джэндар	Джандаров
Дзэгъащт	—
Дзэпщ	—
Драгун	—
ДышъэчӀ	—
Дэбракъыкъо	Дебракиков
Емтыл	—
Еутых	Еутыхов
Ечмэкъо	—
Жане	—
Жанэкъо	—
Жьанэ	Жанев
Заурым	—
Иуан	—
Иуанкъо	—
Иуаныкъу	Иваников
Иуныхь	Юнихов
Къазаныкъо	—
Къалэбатэ	Калибатов
Къандауыр	—
Къанымэт	—
Къунчыкъо	—
Къудэбэрдыкъо	—
Къуекъо	—
Къужъэй	—
Къуйыжъ	—
Къылыщкъо	—
Къэлобат	—
Къэнэмэт	—
КъочӀас	—
Къокӏасэ	Кочесеко
Лакъ	—
Лъэпшъыкъо	—
ЛӀымафэкъо	—
ЛӀышъхьакъо	Тлишхаков
ЛӀэрыгъу	—
Майыис	—
Мастыр	Мастиров
Мед	—
Мысрэукъо	—
МэфэшӀукъо	Мафошов
Мэршэн	—
Нэгъой	—
Нэгор	—
Нэжъ	Нажев
Ордэкъо	—
Пэфыр	—
Пэдыс	Падисов
ПчыхьалӀыкъо	—
Пщыгъусэ	—
Пщыгъут	—
ПщыхьачӀэ	—
ПыхъучӀ	—
Рыста	—
Сид	—
Такъырыкъо	Такириков
Талостэн	—
Тамбий	—
Трам	—
Тыгъужъ	—
Тыгъурыгъу	—
ТхьакумачӀэ	—
Тэмджан	—
Утыж	Утижов
Утыжъый	—
Хэусай	—
Хъуран	—
Хъыт	—
Хьабачир	—
Хьабатыр	Хабатыров
Хьажъукъо	—
Хьаткъо	—
Хьатыкъо	Хатиков
Хьацуккъо	—
ХьачӀэмаф	—
ХьачӀэмыз	—
Хьапае	Хапаев
Хьэтыжъыкъо	—
Цагъо	—
ЦӀэгъош	Цегошов
Чыжъэкъо	—
Чыназыр	Чиназиров
Чукъо	—
Чурмыт	—
Чэгъэдыу	—
Чэтыжъ	—
ЧӀэсэбий	—
Шегъур	—
Шермет	—
Шъанхъо	—
Шъобае	Собаев
Шэджэрыкъо	Шегероков
Шэуджен	—
Шэукъар	—
Ӏагумкъо	—
Ӏагъу	—
Ӏэбатэ	—
Ӏэжэгъуй	—
Ӏубжъаукъо	—

== See also ==
- Circassians#Tribes
- Ethnic cleansing of Circassians
- Shapsugs
- Bzhedug
- Abzakhs
- Zhaney
- Mamkhegh
- Natukhai
- Chemguy
- Besleney
