= Pshish =

River in Russia

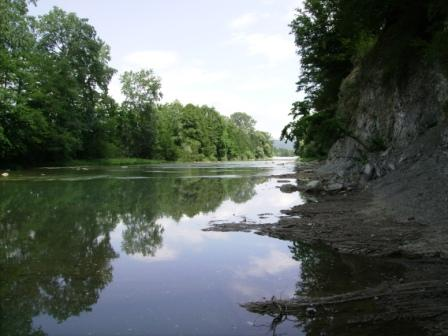

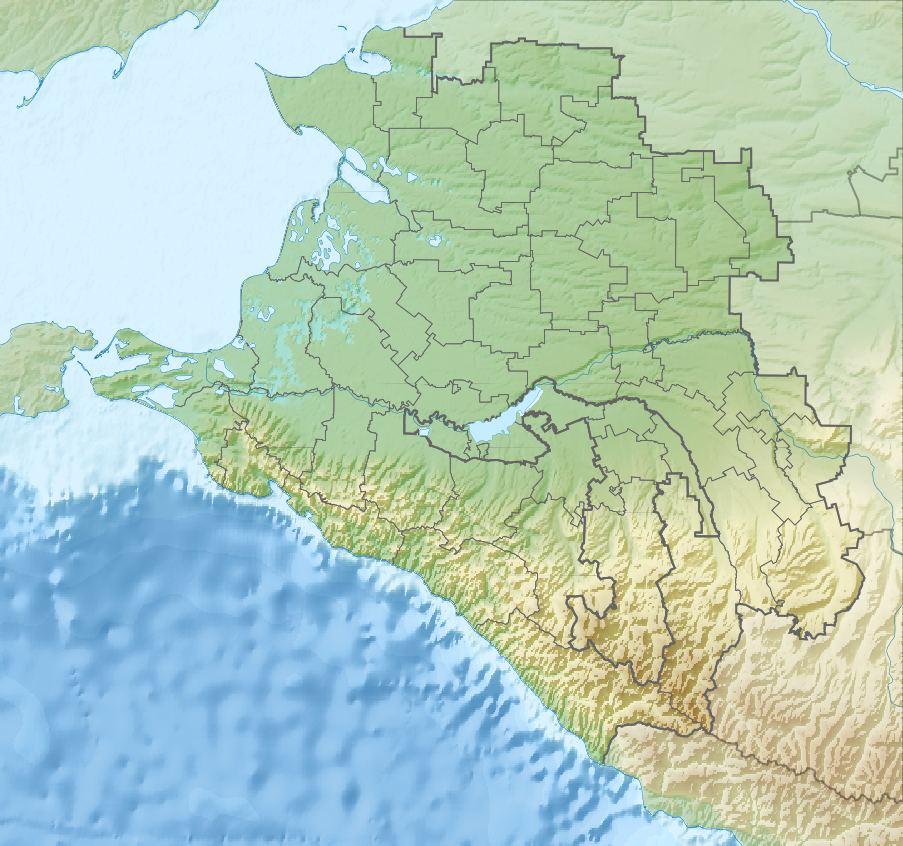
- Location within Krasnodar Krai Location within Caucasus Mountains Location within European Russia

Physical characteristics
- Mouth: Kuban
  - coordinates: 44.9978°N 39.4069°E
- Length: 258 km (160 mi)
- Basin size: 1,850 km^{2} (710 sq mi)

Basin features
- Progression: Kuban→ Sea of Azov

Pshish (Russian: Пшиш; Adyghe: Пщыщ) is a river in Krasnodar Krai and the Republic of Adygea of Russia. It is a left tributary of the Kuban. It is 258 kilometres (160 mi) long, with a drainage basin of 1,850 square kilometres (710 mi^{2}).
