= Gonoda =

Gonoda Гонода Гьонода
- Selo
- Location within Republic of Dagestan Location within Russia
- Coordinates: 42°28′N 46°46′E
- Country: Russia
- Region: Republic of Dagestan
- District: Gunibsky District
- Time zone: UTC+3:00

Gonoda (Russian: Гонода; Avar: Гьонода) is a rural locality (a selo) in Gunibsky District, Republic of Dagestan, Russia. The population was 1,417 as of 2010. There are 3 streets.

== Geography ==
Gonoda is located 49 km northwest of Gunib (the district's administrative centre) by road. Gogotl and Teletl are the nearest rural localities.
