= Muhammad Amin Asiyalav =

Circassian politician

Pasha Mirmiran Muhammad "Amin" Asiyalav
- МухIаммад Асиялау; Мыхьэмэд ӏэмин محمد أمين الداغستاني
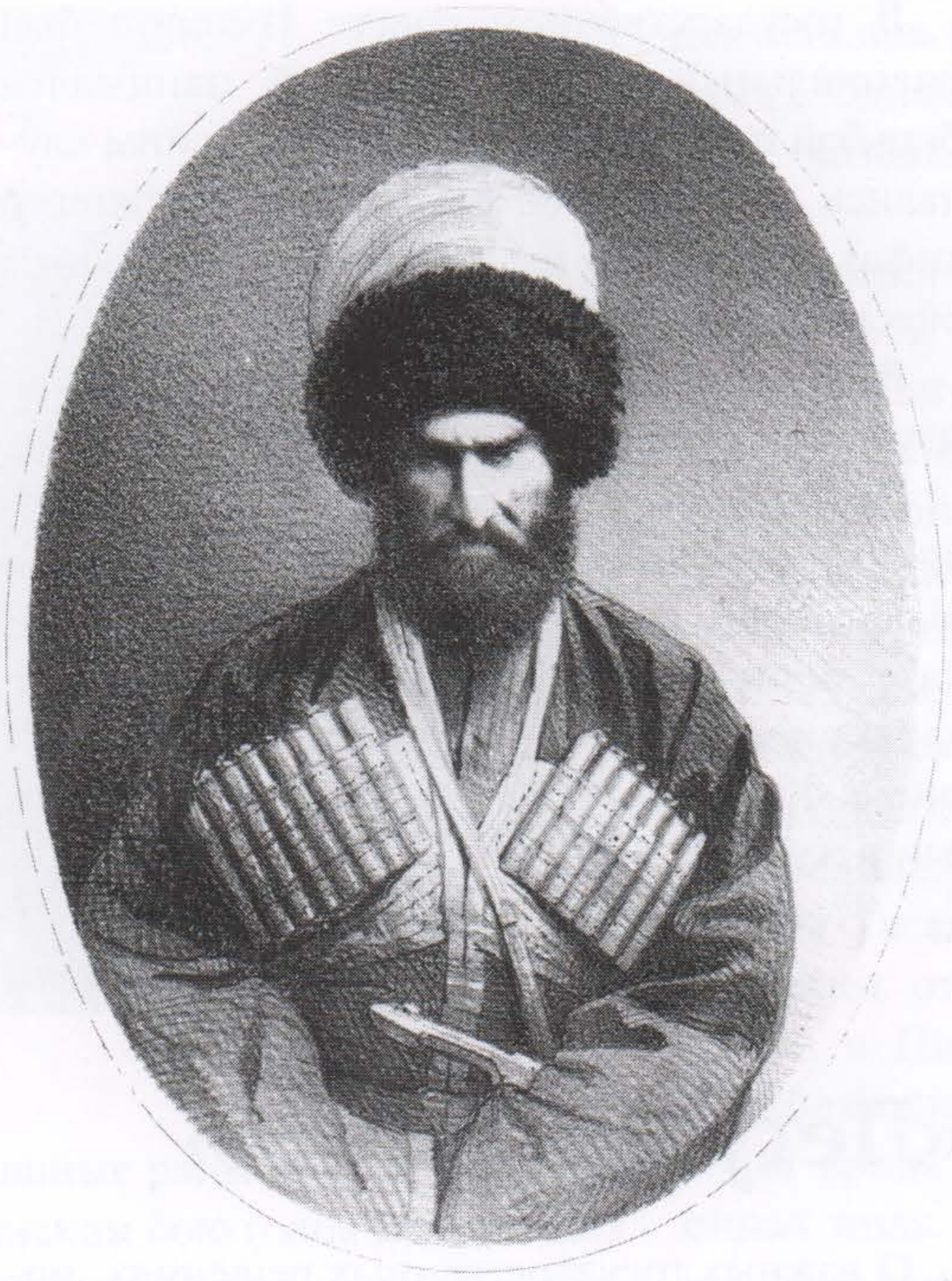
- Drawing of Muhammad Amin in Khamkety, November 20, 1859, based on a private photograph.

Mudir (Mayor-Governor) of Little Chechnya
- In office 1835–1846
- Appointed by: Imam Shamil

Supreme Leader of Circassia
- In office October 26, 1848 – April 1857
- In office November 28, 1857 – November 20, 1859
- Appointed by: Himself

Imam Shamil's Deputy in Circassia
- In office October 26, 1848 – September 6, 1859
- Appointed by: Imam Shamil
- Preceded by: Suleiman Effendi
- Succeeded by: Office abolished

Leader of the Circassian Revolution
- In office October 26, 1848 – April 1857
- In office November 28, 1857 – November 20, 1859

Ottoman Governor of Circassia
- In office September 1855 – April 1857
- Appointed by: Abdülmecid I
- Governor-General: Mustafa Pasha
- Succeeded by: Seferbiy Zaneqo

Personal details
- Born: Muhammad ibn Hajji al-Honodi; 20 October 1818 Gonoda, Avar Nutsalate
- Died: 8 April 1901 (aged 82) Bursa, Hüdavendigâr vilayet, Ottoman Empire
- Resting place: Armutköy, Bursa, Turkey
- Parent(s): Hajji (father); Ayzay (mother)
- Education: Madrasa of Gonoda
- Awards: Order of the Medjidie (Ottoman Empire)
- Religion: Sunni Islam: Creed: Ash'ari; Jurisprudence: Shafi'i; Order: Naqshbandi (Khalidiyya)
- Nickname: Naib

Military service
- Allegiance: Caucasian Imamate (1834–1859): Circassia (1848–1859); Ottoman Empire (mainly nominal, caliphal authority recognised)
- Branch/service: Army
- Years of service: 1834–1859
- Rank: Commander-in-chief (Circassia); Mirmiran (Ottoman Empire)
- Battles/wars: Circassian Revolution; Caucasus War; Murid War; Russo-Circassian War

Muhammad "Amin" Asiyalav ("the Trustworthy"; Avar: МухIаммад Асиялау, Adyghe: Мыхьэмэд ӏэмин; 1818 – 8 April 1901) also known as Naib-Pasha, (Turkish: Nâib Paşa) was a North Caucasian military commander, politician and Sufi leader who served as the de facto leader of Circassia from 1848 to 1859. He was one of the Circassian leaders in the Russo-Circassian War. Ruling with dictatorial powers, his reign was marked with various reforms in industry, diplomacy, military, administration, and religious issues. He banned slavery and slave trade, abolished social classes, established schools, promoted Islam and built small factories. Under his rule, Circassia transformed from a confederation based on the Adyghe Khabze into a unified "military-theocratic state".

Following a mandate by Imam Shamil to lead the Circassians, Amin arrived in Circassia disguised as an ordinary clergyman and rose to power in two years, eventually unifying the loose Circassian Confederation into a united government by force of arms and diplomacy. Although nominally Shamil's governor, he acted independently, as communication between the two parties was difficult, all secular and spiritual power was concentrated entirely in his hands. Among other things, he believed that 'all are equal before God' and thus forced many of the nobility to give up their privileges. His goal was to first unite Circassia, then unify with Shamil to form a pan-Caucasian state. Amin's anti-feudal and Islamist policies ultimately ignited a civil war against the traditional Circassian aristocracy, which hindered his movement. Confronted with the Circassian genocide and a rapidly collapsing resistance, he engineered a peace treaty with the Russian Empire in an attempt to shield his remaining subjects before relinquishing his power and leaving for the Ottoman Empire, where he died an impoverished man.

== Biography ==
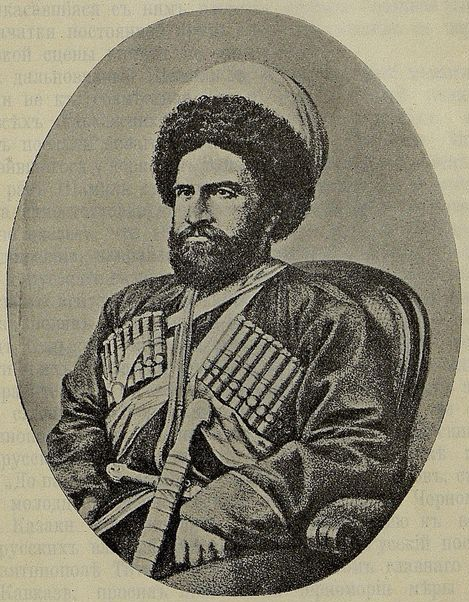
Full portrait

=== Early life ===
==== Origin and family ====
Muhammad Amin was born in Gonoda, an Avar village situated in the Gunib district of Dagestan. Some sources state he was born on October 20, 1818. However, there is some historical discrepancy regarding his exact birth year, as the epitaph on his grave claims he lived to be 107 years old. Some of his descendants claim he was born earlier, around 1790 (1210 AH). He was raised by his father Hajji and his mother Ayzay. He was of mixed origins, including Avar and Lak origins. He was descended from a cadet-branch of the ruling dynasty of Gazikumukh Khanate, who had moved to Avaria in 1681 due to family disputes. His direct ancestor was Gunash-khan, the eldest son of the Gazikumukh khan Muhammad-khan. According to tradition, he was also a descendant of Quraysh. Some of his ancestors were said to have descended from Qurayshi warriors who settled in Dagestan during the Abbasid period. According to other sources, his family had migrated to Dagestan from Abkhazia.

Muhammad Amin's birth name was simply Muhammad, he was named in honor of his stepfather. In Dagestan, he was also known by the middle name "Asiyalav". He was given the middle name "Asiyalav" (Asiya's) in reference to his stepfather's mother, Asiya. Imam Shamil started referring to Muhammad as "Muhammad the Trustworthy" when he was eighteen. Shamil consistently started his Arabic-language letters to him with the greeting "To our trustworthy Muhammad". Because the word for "trustworthy" in Arabic is "Amin," the Circassians, and later the Russians, assumed this must be his surname and began referring to Muhammad Asiyalav as Muhammad Amin. Muhammad adopted this name, calling himself "Muhammad Amin" in Circassia. According to one account, after the war, Imam Shamil was surprised to learn from the Russians that the famous Muhammad Amin in Circassia was in fact his deputy, Muhammad Asiyalav.

==== Youth and education ====
From a very early age, he received an Islamic education. His first teacher was Hassan Hussein Effendi, a scholar from his village. Until the age of 11, he studied in his own village, in the Madrasa of Gonoda, learning the Quran. His father died during a raid into Georgia; and after the death of his father at the age of 11, Amin began to lead a wandering lifestyle and indulged in teaching and learning. He studied the Quran and traveled from village to village in the Caucasus and Anatolia. He later stated in his autobiography:

In the first years of my life, I wandered as a talmiz [student]... This began after the death of my father in year 1245 after the Hijra, and I was 11 years old then.

He took a formal madrasa education under teachers such as Daut-bek, learning among other things the Arabic, Persian, Russian languages, as well as many of the Dagestani languages. Later, he also studied under the spiritual guidance of the Sufi master Abdurrahman Hajji al-Sughuri. As part of his education, he memorised the entire Quran, earning the title of Hafiz by the age of 13. He was described as "well-educated and devout", with a strong physique and a "pleasant face". Teofil Lapinski, a Polish officer who met Amin in 1859, described his appearance, noting that Amin possessed a handsome and noble face framed by a dark beard, a sturdy build, and above average height. He dressed entirely in white woolen Caucasian clothing with a white kalpak. 19th-century scholar Mirza Kazimbek claimed that Amin surpassed Imam Shamil in his level of scientific knowledge. Kazimbek, who met Amin, also described him as a dark-haired, solidly built, tall, and well-proportioned man with a pleasant face and a gentle smile always on his lips. He was also described as an "extremely capable and dexterous man" by witness accounts.

Amin interacted with Circassians since the age of three, thus despite being of Dagestani origin he had some understanding of the Adyghe language even before his arrival in Circassia.

=== Career ===
==== Joining the Imamate ====
When Muhammad Amin turned fifteen, he joined the ranks of Imam Shamil. After proving himself in battle, he gained high ranks in Shamil's government. He continued his studies during this time. At the age of seventeen, he attained the status of a murid, a student in Islamic Sufism. He was part of the Naqshbandiyya-Khalidiyya Sufi order.

He grew to be one of Shamil's most trusted friends and reliable followers. He spent a long time working as Shamil's personal secretary. Pleased with Muhammad Amin's abilities in scholarship and military campaigns, Imam Shamil appointed him as a governor in a region of Chechnya ("Little Chechnya", possibly in modern-day Ingushetia) when he was seventeen years old. He served as Imam Shamil's advisor and most trusted deputy for thirteen years and also became a part of the Imam's council.

==== Appointment as Naib ====
Historically in Circassia, a Sworn brotherhood (Adyghe: ЗэтхьарIогъу, lit. 'Mutual oath-ship') was a voluntary clan where people or families come together by choice. The National Oath which emerged in the early 1800s sought to unite all of Circassia in this manner as a "national" oath. In 1841, the Ubykh, Natukhaj, Shapsug, Abzakh, and several Abkhaz-Abazin societies wrote down the principles of the National Oath in a written document called the "Defter of 1841". This document was Islamic in character, and sought to unify all of Circassia under one rule.

In 1846, a Circassian delegation visited the lands of Imam Shamil. They asked him to appoint a leader for Circassia. The decision took place during a meeting that included Circassian deputies. The proposed candidate had to pass their approval, and the Imamate leadership accepted rejections from the deputies when they occurred. At the meeting, Suleyman Efendi, a Kabardian Circassian, spoke for the Circassians:

Our people, like the peoples of Dagestan and Chechnya, want to continue the struggle for freedom. The enemy's goal is to enslave us and seize our homeland. Our people need to organize to defend our homeland against the godless and infidels, and they need a leader to organize this. Geographically, our region is not like Dagestan and Chechnya. The Adyghe region is surrounded by enemies on three sides. We do not want our people to scatter everywhere like a flock of sheep searching for food. Respected Imam, under your leadership, we need a leader who can govern our people. I believe that we must act together on this matter. Otherwise, we fear that our people will have to leave their homeland and go to Ottoman Turkey, and our sacred lands will fall into the hands of the enemies.

Shamil initially refused these requests, arguing that he could not take responsibility for a matter that affected the well-being of the entire country. However, Shamil's secretary, Mirza Amir-Khan, convinced him that the people "could not be left to the mercy of short-sighted leaders". The elders further stated that if Shamil did not provide a suitable person, they would "hold onto the hem of his cherkeska in the afterlife to prevent him from entering paradise". Shamil was concerned by this declaration and offered to appoint his secretary Mirza Amir-Khan to the position, but Mirza Amir-Khan refused. Muhammad Amin, who was reading the Quran and overheard the conversation, volunteered for this position. Initially, Shamil seemed to doubt Amin's capability for this task. However, others at the meeting, including Sufi sheikh Jamaluddin Kumuki, responded positively. Thus Imam Shamil's response was as follows:

We have listened to your wishes and demands. I say this with all sincerity; we are ready to help you, to extend our hand to Western Caucasus, to Circassia. However, the deputy we will send to you must know Circassia well. If a ruler does not know the language of the people he governs, it becomes difficult to manage affairs. We have two individuals who know Circassia well and will successfully carry out this task. One of these scholars is the State Secretary, Muhammad Tahir Karakh. The other is Deputy (Naib) Muhammad Amin, the son of a former copper craftsman. His father worked in Circassia before and lived there for a long time. In this respect, Muhammad Amin knows Circassia very well. And this great scholar is also a member of our organization. ... I have no doubt that my brother Muhammad Amin will not refuse this task. Because I am sure that he will succeed in his very important and honorable duty in Circassia, in making our shared hopes flourish.

After much debate, Muhammad Amin accepted the duty:

In accordance with the Imam's order and the wishes of our people, I will undertake this task and strive to fulfill it. However, I have one request: I ask that Suleyman Efendi and the others swear an oath that they will serve the religion and the country, and remain loyal to the Imam and to me until the end.

According to other sources, Shamil had been preparing Muhammad Amin for this role with a long-term goal in mind. However, when the Circassian ambassadors arrived, he feigned hesitation and issued several subtle refusals, a tactic designed to increase the future authority of his chosen envoy.

Eventually, the Circassian delegation swore an oath of loyalty on the Quran. Muhammad Amin's title was "Naib", the deputy of Imam Shamil. The powers and duties entrusted to him were to unify the social classes, currently divided into upper, middle, and lower strata, according to Islamic principles, and to establish a solid unity among them based on democratic principles; to create administrative and judicial institutions based on Islamic scholarly principles instead of the old practices based on customs and traditions; to establish industrial enterprises aiming for collective development; to divide the Western Caucasus into administrative regions, govern it from a single center, and stand against the enemy with the military forces gathered and organized in this manner. Imam Shamil also stated that financial assistance would be provided from the Imamate Treasury for the establishment of administrative institutions, the recruitment of soldiers, and the procurement of weapons in Circassia.

Amin was not the first naib to be appointed in Circassia. He was preceded by two other emissaries who had gone to Circassia for various reasons. The first was Hadji-Muhammad, who operated in the area from May 1842 to May 1844. The second was Suleiman-Efendi, who arrived in February 1845 and remained until the spring of 1846. Both of them had failed. The Western Circassians generally favored the political aspects of Muridism—uniting against Russia—but were not inclined toward religious fanaticism.

Due to the security risks, Amin's journey from Dagestan was conducted with extreme caution and secrecy. Initially traveling with two horsemen, he sent his transport back upon reaching Chechnya and continued the journey disguised as a beggar to avoid detection. At some point, he was hidden inside a merchant cart. Upon arriving in the Kabardia region, Amin spent a month conducting a discreet situational assessment. During this period, he developed a regional strategy focused on first securing the religious allegiance and trust of the Abzakhs, reasoning that their support would naturally extend his influence over the other Adyghe societies. He chose the Abzakh because they were already firm Muslims, and they had previously expelled their princes and nobles, making them receptive to the message of general equality preached by the muridism of Imam Shamil. Amin spent two months navigating from Kabardia to the Besleney territories. During his time in Besleney, he actively engaged in local diplomacy and community life by attending weddings and funerals, and by reciting the Quran in Arabic for the residents. Before finally moving on to the Abzakh region, he also expanded his outreach by visiting nearby Abaza, Tatar, and Karachay settlements.

In August 1845 or 1846, Amin arrived in Circassia. However, for two years, he did not reveal himself. He stayed as a guest at the house of Circassian elder Hajji Tlam and improved his fluency in the Adyghe language. He studied the political and social situation of the region, including the status of Islam in Abzakh society. He pretended that he did not want to interfere in the affairs of the country, and spent much of his time in worship. At some point, he stayed in Khadjemuqohabl. He was examined by a local cleric who verified his deep knowledge of the Quran, leading all local clerics to consult him. Amin observed that the Circassians hated their princes due to their oppressive privileges and slaveholding. He spent his time in silence secretly increasing his influence, gathering allies and loyal followers.

A skilled orator, Muhammad Amin cultivated a charismatic and somewhat enigmatic public persona, adopting an authoritative posture toward regional elites while maintaining a highly approachable and friendly demeanor with the general peasant populace. His promises of a better future secured him significant influence over the Abzakh. After observing the population, he presented his credentials as proof that he was the true representative of Imam Shamil. Amin's knowledge of Islam had impressed the Circassians.

==== Election as Leader of Circassia ====
Amin took power in 1848. The Khase, an ad-hoc assembly, acted as the supreme legislative and decision-making body of Circassia, gathering representatives from all regions to resolve issues by unanimous consensus. Both Amin and the local leader Hajji Tlam identified an upcoming regional assembly as a strategic opportunity to consolidate power. In October 1848, during a preliminary gathering on the banks of the Pshekha River, Hajji Tlam utilized his political leverage to appoint Amin as the head of the Abzakh delegation for the Khase that was to be held in Adagum. In the same Pshekha gathering, Muhammad Amin presented proof that he is truly Shamil's deputy. He instantly declared that under Islamic law, all men are equal, abolishing the ruling class and their privileges on the spot. According to reports, after Amin's speech, the ruling nobles were left "paralyzed as if struck by lightning". The nobility and princes immediately drew their swords to defend their "ancestral rights". However, Muhammad Amin had anticipated this resistance and surrounded himself with thousands of armed supporters he had quietly recruited. Amin's loyalists killed many nobles, while others were forced to flee the country to seek Russian protection.

The Adagum Khase officially convened on October 26, 1848. After prayers for the success of Circassia, recitation of al-Fatiha, and a speech from Hassan Khoja, the leader of the Khase, Amin made a speech:

Adyghes!

The elders will remember Imam Mansur and his words. He had said: 'The peoples of the Caucasus are like brothers fed from the same breast. The Supreme Prophet has commissioned me to unite them.' Gazi Muhammad Molla and Hamzat Chanka followed his path. Imam Shamil also follows him. Just as Imam Mansur considered the Caucasian peoples as brothers, the others shared the same belief. Imam Mansur came all the way from Chechnya to Anapa. But Imam Shamil does not have such a chance and opportunity. Because he is facing the Tsar's most ruthless generals. That is why he sent his naibs [deputies] to you. The naibs who came before did good deeds. If you permit me, I want to complete the work they left unfinished. I have mastered your language in two years. I got to know you closely. I saw that you have no other ideal than to protect your homeland, your honor, and your dignity. We must unite under a single command. Otherwise, it is impossible for us to achieve success. Give me the authority! Let us unite under one flag. Let us drive the Russians out of the Kuban Region.

... Imam Shamil says the following in his letter to the Adyghe people: "...If you are true Muslims, trust me. I swear that your struggle is for our common future, for our holy cause. Be steadfast, do not lose your hope and courage. Earthly life is but a test. Almighty Allah will protect you."

His overthrowing of the nobility, strong following among the peasants, and secret loyalists got him elected as leader of Circassia in the Khase. Muhammad Amin thus inherited the remnants of the National Oath movement, and sought to extend his rule to the entirety of Circassia. Upon hearing of his arrival, thousands of families who had previously been forced to submit to Russia threw off their allegiance to Russia and submit to Amin. From the time of his arrival among the Abzakh, Muhammad Amin did not spend more than a week in the same place, constantly inspecting his territory.

==== Consolidation of Power ====
Muhammad Amin's non-Adyghe origins and his subsequent unfamiliarity with the Adyghe Khabze led to the formation of an opposition faction. The opposition grew due to the fact that in his addresses, he noticeably omitted references to both Seferbiy Zaneqo, one of the leaders of the National Oath, and the Islamic Caliph. Amin then initiated a dialogue with the opposition leaders, culminating in a formal meeting at the estate of Seferbiy Zaneqo, facilitated by Zaneqo's son, Qarabatir, where Amin delivered an address to a group of Circassian leaders:

As you know, I am a stranger to this region. Actually, I prefer to listen rather than speak. However, I must confess that I have benefited greatly from our conversation. I learned many things I did not know. May Allah be pleased with you all. We are actually very strong. The Caucasus is the homeland of heroic people. Our ancestors have lived on these lands since time immemorial, without bowing to anyone. Those who joined us later also adopted our traditions and became one with us. However, from now on, we cannot get anywhere simply by recounting the heroics of our ancestors. Muscle power is now a thing of the past. The era of the spear and sword is over. Our enemies possess firearms that turn everywhere into hell. If we fail to unite under a single command, our fate will be doomed. Do you know what politics is? Russia has ambassadors all over the world. Do you know what they say about us? 'The Circassians are our subjects. Caucasians are savage tribes. They are bandits rebelling against our Tsar!' Yes, they say whatever comes to their mouths. Why? To cover their flaws, to justify themselves. Well, who will respond to these baseless lies? We do not have a state or ambassadors to speak on our behalf abroad; as Qarabatir explained just a moment ago. The Ottoman Sultan, whom we trusted as the Caliph of Islam, detained Zaneqo Seferbiy, whom we sent as an envoy to Istanbul in 1836, so as not to offend the Russians. He did not allow him to return to his country. Why? Because we could not become a state. We will either become a state, or we will submit to the Russians. And the way to become a state is to unite under a single leader.

While Qarabatir initially refrained from public objection during the meeting, he maintained a lifelong resistance to Amin's administration. Amin made several unsuccessful attempts to recruit Qarabatir. At the time, Seferbiy Zaneqo was residing in the Ottoman Empire and had not instructed his son to abandon his pragmatic alignment with the Russian Empire. Consequently, Qarabatir consistently reaffirmed his allegiance to Russia. In a formal communication to Russian officials, Qarabatir described Amin as a curse upon Circassia and vowed permanent loyalty to the Russian Tsar.

Following his address, the majority of the local leaders accepted Muhammad Amin's authority. Capitalizing on this consensus, Amin outlined his political and military objectives through three primary initiatives. First, he proposed the creation of a permanent standing army. Second, he planned to implement a formal taxation system to fund this military force and other state expenditures. Third, he intended to reorganize the territory into defined administrative zones to establish centralized governance. Furthermore, religious scholars from Dagestan were brought in to instruct the local population in Islamic and Sufi practices. Amin thus assumed full control over Circassia. Among his titles was "reis" (boss, supreme leader) of the Western Caucasus. Muhammad Amin operated independently in the region and recognized Shamil's authority largely nominally. Communication between the two parties was very difficult, if not impossible. Amin's ideology relied on the Imamate principles of shura, sharia, and jihad. His state structure was based on that of the Caucasian Imamate, which itself was based on the Rashidun Caliphate. He established courts of law (mahkamas), mosques, traditional schools (madrasas), and a treasury (bayt al-mal). He introduced a traditional Muslim system of taxation comprising alms (zakat) and a land tax (kharaj). During his reign, he worked to spread the ideals of Sufism among the Circassians.

Before Amin's arrival, some regions in Circassia were governed by the common people in a semi-anarchic manner (Abzakh, Natukhaj, Shapsug), feudal princes ruled in other regions (especially Bzhedug, Temirgoy, Hatuqay, etc.). Some of these princes had been forced to submit to Russia, while others had voluntarily aligned with Russia to protect their feudal rights. Muhammad Amin lost no time in attacking the princely administrations. He argued that the concept of nobility was inherently anti-Islamic. In an early speech, Muhammad Amin argued that "the disgrace of the Adyghe people must be put to an end", meaning, "princes and nobles" must be abolished as the concept of nobles is against the Quran, and slaves must be liberated.

When the princes revolted against him, he crushed the rebellion, seized their lands and wealth, and distributed them among the poor. He also freed the commoners from their previous duties and taxes to the aristocracy. He also freed all Muslim slaves. These reforms met fierce resistance from the Circassian nobility, as the introduction of sharia equalized them with peasants and removed their administrative privileges. He also banned the slave trade, eliminating a major source of wealth for many nobles. This won him the loyalty of the peasant masses.

Present at the Khase assembly held on the banks of the Pshekha river in the Abzakh territory in January 1849, Muhammad Amin spoke against the nobility:

The people who accept the religion of our Prophet become equal to all Muslims and have the same rights. In the Sharia system, a Muslim does not become a subject to a Muslim; therefore, the privileges of the nobles, princes, and aghas will be abolished.

To establish his authority, he wrote a letter to Circassian princes:

You must honor, firstly, God, secondly, his prophet Muhammad, and thirdly, listen to and obey me, your leader - superior!

Amin's power spread most easily among the Abzakh because they had few nobles or wealthy community members.

==== Rule and Reforms ====
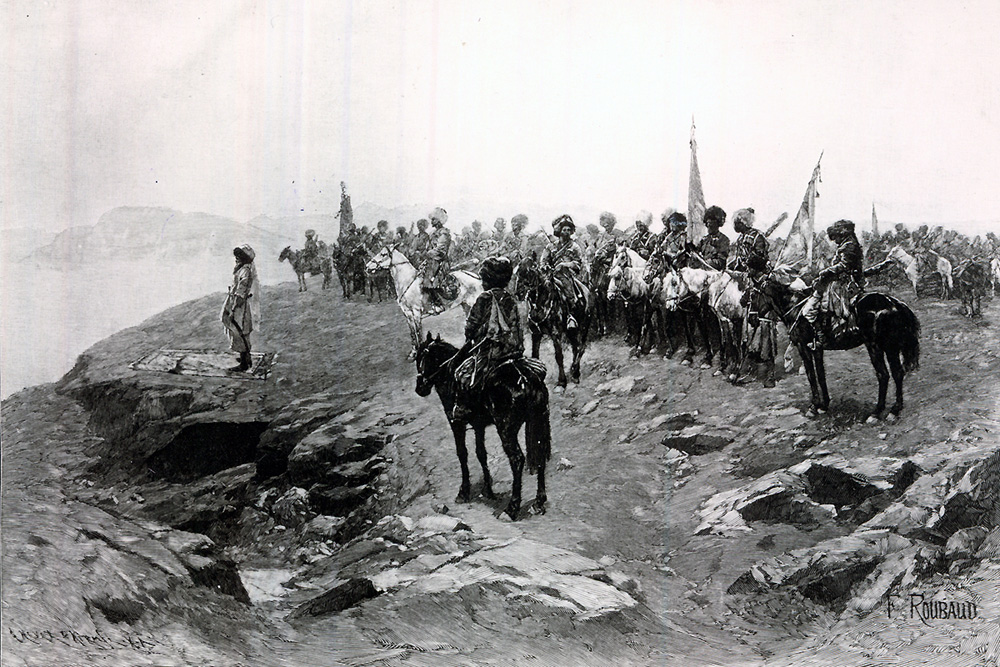
Murtaziq forces on horseback

To enforce his rule, Muhammad Amin established a permanent elite force known as "Murtaziq". This permanent military guard was formed by the end of 1848. This standing force functioned as a police force or gendarmerie and the core of his regular army. According to Russian reports, it was easier to deal with thousands of regular soldiers than only several hundred murtaziq units. The murtaziqs lived in the local mosque and were responsible for executing the naib's orders, enforcing judicial decisions, guarding the fortified administrative centers called mehkeme, and suppressing disobedience among the population. The force was maintained through mandatory taxes collected from the population, including cattle, grain, sheep cheese, and silver rubles. The murtaziq units were initially recruited from local Circassians. However, fearing opposition from the local population, Muhammad Amin freed Russian and Polish slaves held in the region, including former soldiers, Cossacks, and artillerymen, converted them to Islam, and recruited them to the murtaziqs. He also recruited abreks, as well as criminals and outlaws. By relying on former prisoners, Muhammad Amin neutralized the competing locals and ensured that murtaziq were only loyal to himself. The murtaziqs accompanied Muhammad Amin on all his travels. Muhammad Amin rode through the region at the head of his murtaziqs and accompanied by a mobile artillery piece, compelling the inhabitants to gather for prayer and to pay taxes. The murtaziqs carried out every order of the naib without question. Amin constantly travelled from region to region, inviting the locals to keep fighting against Russia and submit to his rule. When he invited a region to submit to his rule, he carried a cannon behind him.

Vilayet of Circassia ولاية الشركس (Arabic) Адыгэ Уилает (Adyghe)
- Imamate Province (1848–1859)
- 1848–1859
- Seal
- Capital: Khadzokh
- Government
  - Type: Military-Theocratic Dictatorship
- Naib (Deputy)
  - 1848-1859: Muhammad Amin Asiyalav
- History
  - Established: 1848
  - Disestablished: 1859

In late January 1849, Muhammad Amin spoke at a large public gathering. He urged the Circassians to renew their Islamic faith through strict adherence to sharia law and total participation in a holy war. He announced his goal was to unite the entire Trans-Kuban population into a single alliance, cease all peaceful relations with the invading Russians, and execute the will of the caliph. To elevate his mission, he discredited his predecessors, Hadji-Muhammad and Suleiman-efendi, labeling them as deceivers who acted for personal gain. He then proclaimed an appeal from Shamil, stating that the sultan summoned all Trans-Kuban people to fight the Russians and to be ready to move wherever ordered. Those who disobeyed faced severe punishments, including the burning of their homes, confiscation of property, and imprisonment in deep earthen pits. After a period of imprisonment in these pits, he would either forgive the individuals upon their oath of unconditional obedience or condemn them to death, which usually consisted of drowning. During his reign, crime rates decreased significantly. Upon seeing the importance of Khabze in Circassian society, he sought to harmonize Islamic law with local customs, and he also spared many local customs from his bans. He also promoted the celebration of Ramadan and observance of Islamic customs.

In spring of 1849, the Chemguys, Makhosh, and Yegeruqays nominally recognized his authority. During the summer of 1849, Muhammad Amin initiated the establishment of a centralized state within Abzakh territory. He promulgated new laws and implemented a uniform administrative system across the region. The demographic structure was reorganized so that every one hundred households constituted a local community, managed by popularly elected headmen known as Thamades. Each thamade was assisted by five abreks to enforce police control. The territory was partitioned into four administrative provinces. The leadership of each province consisted of a mufti and three qadis. These provincial centers were fortified settlements protected by defensive trenches and woven fences, and each was equipped with two cannons. The infrastructure of each judicial center included a mosque, a courtroom, a madrasa, food storage facilities, administrative offices, guard stations, and stables. Additionally, they contained pits used for the confinement of criminals, prisoners of war, and political dissidents. The military structure was modeled directly after the organization developed by Imam Shamil. Amin also instituted a system of monetary fines for violating religious rules or resisting his administration. In response to these fines, some penalized individuals secretly set fire to the hay and buildings belonging to Amin's officials. As part of Amin's government, an official named Abdullah was appointed as the head of schools in Circassia, serving as the chief yefendi (scholar).

The military system required every household to supply one or, if necessary, two cavalrymen during times of war. Muhammad Amin sought to elevate the status of the military, requiring new recruits to swear a formal oath. Under severe circumstances, the mufti presiding over the regional court possessed the authority to declare a general mobilization and mandate universal conscription. For defense, settlements all over Circassia were fortified with moats and fences made of earth and wattle, and some were equipped with cannons. Amin started building more mosques and schools all over Circassia. In the legal sphere, he replaced laws based on Adyghe Khabze with Islamic sharia law. Politically, he relied on wealthy freemen and elders to staff his administration, instead of feudal nobles. This approach reduced the political independence of the traditional princes. Amin also ordered Circassian elders to collect old artillery pieces that had been captured from Russian forts or wrecked ships. He gathered Russian captives and Polish deserters to repair the artillery and train his forces, forming his personal guard and artillery unit from these men. Following this, Amin established his own hidden gunpowder factories and artillery repair shops in the mountains, using runaway Russian and Cossack prisoners of war to build cannons for the Circassian resistance.

In addition to the Murtaziqs, Amin also had intelligence units and spies. He maintained an effective and centralized intelligence network that monitored nearly all movements across the Caucasus. Amin is quoted as claiming that no person could travel from Dagestan to Abzakh without personally visiting him, unless they had something to fear or hide. In some cases, he uncovered the identities of Russian spies, including Russian spies disguised as dervishes. During military campaigns, to relay information in the dark without alarming the enemy, Amin's leaders and scouts communicated using animal calls. Commanders imitated the cry of a jackal to check if squads were ready, and the cry of an owl signaled the army to advance. Amin himself constantly had to combat Russian espionage within his own territory. Russian commanders frequently paid disgruntled nobles to act as informants and guides.

Amin was suspicious of the Ottoman Empire, and defined them as "semi-giaour". Despite this, when he banned relationships with Russians, he defined this ban as a great service to Islam and the Ottoman Caliphate. Beginning in the spring of 1849, Amin expanded his political operations to integrate Circassian societies who were in peace with Russia, including the Makhosh and Yegeruqay. Amin also initiated campaigns to ally with the Besleney, the Bzhedug, and the Kabardian populations located beyond the Kuban river. A Besleney delegation met Amin at the Urup River on June 13, 1849. There, they swore an oath of allegiance, committing to hostility toward Russia and total obedience to his commands. Consequently, the forested areas of the Laba became a strategic sanctuary where the Besleney provided food, shelter, and intelligence to Amin's warriors.

Muhammad Amin faced opposition from both pacifist and militant Circassian factions during his efforts to unite Circassia. To establish order, he implemented a stricter penal code. This included capital punishment for individuals convicted of espionage for the Tsarist army. Notwithstanding these severe judicial actions, Amin successfully secured the backing of the majority of the populace.

The territories populated by the Shapsug, Natukhaj, and Ubykh were central to Amin's strategic objectives. However, the general Shapsug population did not align with his leadership. While the Abin-Shapsug and Natukhaj communities, who were highly vulnerable to Russian military incursions, actively requested his intervention, Shapsug groups residing in the mountainous areas along the Shebzh and Afips rivers rejected his authority and organized armed resistance to prevent his entry into their territory.

Amin subsequently issued an ultimatum to the dissenting Mountain Shapsug populations. Upon their refusal, he made an angry speech to his commanders:

The Russians have been using us against each other for years. They are doing everything in their power to keep us in scattered, small groups. Will we learn this truth only after we are completely destroyed!

Amin waited for a fatwa from Islamic scholars, and a fatwa was issued that those who had rebelled against him shall be executed. Following this, he prepared for a campaign. During the campaign, he advanced with a large force of murtaziqs, causing the outgunned Shapsugs to abandon their defensive positions. The opposition forces, primarily composed of Mountain Shapsugs, mobilized for armed resistance along the Dogai River. The Shapsug resistance was ultimately defeated by Amin's centralization forces, and the Shapsug were subjugated. He compelled the Shapsug elders to swear an oath of allegiance and ordered all crosses on their graves to be dismantled, gathered, and burned. The outcome of the Battle of Dogai deterred further rebellion, and other regions started accepting Amin's authority.

Muhammad Amin believed that absolute authority was a necessity. He ruled as a dictator, his authority was compared to that of a sultan. He created a new order, "Nizam", based on religious values. Amin required all Abzakh males between the ages of 15 and 60 to recite the Islamic declaration of faith (shahada), recorded their names, and made them swear an oath of allegiance. Muhammad Amin used the murtaziqs to crush opposition and enforce compliance. Individuals who disobeyed his orders or maintained contact with the Russians faced severe punishments at the hands of the murtaziq. He called Polish experts to build small-scale factories. His time also saw more importance paid to diplomacy, as he sent representatives to Istanbul and other parts of the world.

As Muhammad Amin advanced toward the Abin River, he commanded a combined Abzakh and Shapsug force of twenty-five thousand troops. He then directed his campaign into Natukhaj territory. The Natukhaj population formally submitted to his authority. Following this agreement, Amin divided the Natukhaj region into two administrative provinces, implementing formal taxation and establishing judicial courts. He continued his administrative expansion into the Shapsug region, setting up three provincial courts along the Ubin, Abin, and Anthur rivers. He later successfully instituted three additional courts located between the Mezib and Pshad rivers, between Shapsaho and Tlapse, and within the Ubykh territory. He also contacted the Hatuqay and took an oath from them.

According to reports, Amin was a talented military commander who strictly adhered to the tactics of mountain guerrilla warfare. In 1849 alone, he directed 101 military raids into Russian occupied territories. His forces frequently executed successful offensives against the Imperial Russian Army. He would first capture a Russian fortification specifically to seize its cannons and ammunition. He would then immediately deploy those newly acquired artillery pieces to attack the next target. In the first half of 1850, his forces inflicted sensitive defeats on Russian troops, particularly in the gorges of the Upper Urup River and its tributaries, while continuously harassing forts along the Black Sea coastline. In April 1850, Amin scored a notable victory against the Stavropol Cossack regiment on the Laba line.

In 1850, Muhammad Amin nearly captured the young Tsarevich Alexander II, the future Russian Emperor, during the royal's trip along the Black Sea cordon line. The Russian convoy narrowly avoided capture by changing its route after receiving timely intelligence about the threat.

In the spring of 1850, the Ubykhs swore loyalty and provided troops, though they demanded autonomy.

To counter the Naib's growing threat, the Russian command concentrated massive forces on the western front and launched large-scale offensive operations in the spring of 1851. On May 26, 1851, Muhammad Amin was defeated by superior Russian forces at the Battle of Mount Umna. Shortly before this, in mid-May, Amin executed a daring maneuver to resettle the Besleney tribe into the mountains. He bypassed Russian General Evdokimov, crossed the Urup River, and captured three villages, but Evdokimov quickly pursued him. Forced to abandon carts at the Urup crossing, Amin's forces were subsequently intercepted and definitively routed by General Eristov's cavalry at the Dzhentelmess heights. These defeats temporarily shattered his aura of invincibility.

The prince of the Hatuqay, Jandjeriy Cherchanuqo, fully accepted Amin's authority in 1851 and migrated to his lands. The free peasants of the Bzhedug region voluntarily submitted to his leadership.

Between 1849 and 1851, Amin had expanded his influence to the Abzakh, Yegeruqay, Makhosh, Chemguy, Hatuqay, Shapsug, Natukhaj, Bzhedug, and Besleney, as well as the Kabardian immigrant community in Western Circassia. Thus, his absolute rule was accepted by almost all Circassians, directly or indirectly. Cossack ataman Kuharenko backed the princes with the Russian army to prevent Muhammad Amin from gaining power in the region, and in May two Russian detachments were stationed in the region.

The Russians, worried about Amin's rise strengthening Circassia, supported the opposition via arms supplies and financial support, as well as promises of high ranks as long as they topple Amin and submit Circassia to Russia. Despite the ongoing Russo-Circassian War, the opposition, mostly made up of nobles who lost their power, accepted these proposals. A significant part of the population, especially those who submitted recently, began to ignore the Naib's orders, causing the administrative system of Circassia to collapse. Russian forces also constructed new fortifications at Shytkale and along the Laba river. The concentration of Russian military infrastructure in the Maykop region caused significant concern among the Circassians.

Amin eventually demanded that more and more nobles renounce their traditional privileges in accordance with Islamic law. This decree provoked armed resistance from the Bzhedug princes and nobles. Amin deployed his forces against them, killing several nobles while others fled to Russian territory, eventually forcing the rest to submit by force. In 1851, the prince of the Makhosh, Muhammad Bogarsuqo, led the resistance against him. He was arrested and was executed by firing squad, due to treason and alleged pro-Russian sympathies.

==== Assassination Attempts and Opposition ====
Muhammad Amin faced persistent assassination attempts during his administration. During an expedition into Shapsug territory, he anticipated an ambush and exchanged clothes with an Abzakh effendi from his retinue. The Shapsugs attempted to assassinate him; the effendi, wearing Amin's garments, was shot twice by the Shapsug fighters, Amin survived. In 1851, a Russian spy presented himself among the Circassians as an envoy from the Ottoman sultan: his mission was to ruin Muhammad Amin's reputation among the local people and to poison him; but he also failed as Amin realised his intentions. In another case, the conspirators planned to assassinate the Naib by tunneling underneath the house where he resided. They excavated the earth underground and successfully managed to dig their way right beneath his home. However, the assassination plot was foiled when the soil unexpectedly collapsed. The sudden cave-in caused the group's lookout to fall into the pit, exposing the trap. In another case, the Hakuch tried to assassinate him. The conspirators planned to shoot him while he was resting. To carry out the assassination, they created a hole in the wattle-and-daub wall of the house, positioning it directly opposite the couch where the naib was expected to sleep. However, Muhammad Amin deduced the conspiracy against him. To protect himself, he altered his sleeping arrangement by placing two mattresses underneath himself instead of the usual one. As a result of this precaution, the assassin's bullet only pierced the mattress, and Muhammad Amin survived the attempt on his life. In other cases, princes and nobles attempted to get him killed, but failed.

Russian authorities constantly circulated rumors about Amin, including false reports stating that he had defected to the Russian Empire. Surrounded by rumors and distrust, Amin encountered continuous internal resistance throughout his tenure. The Shapsug population organized multiple uprisings, which were systematically suppressed by the permanent Murtaziq forces, often culminating in the execution of the rebels by firing squad. Furthermore, Bzhedug princes, threatened by the political alignment between their peasantry and Amin, formally declared allegiance to Russia. As Amin prepared a military campaign against the Bzhedug, renewed insurrections in the Natukhaj and Shapsug territories forced him to divert his attention and exile the new insurgents. Political opposition in certain areas escalated into religious defiance. In the Natukhaj region, a faction attempted to renounce Islam and erect Christian crosses to protest Amin's centralized authority, though the Islamic influence in the area rendered the effort unsuccessful. Amin employed severe punitive measures against his political adversaries, frequently executing opposition leaders with firing squad to maintain administrative control. In 1851, Russian units commanded by Major General Eristov conducted a successful siege that destroyed Amin's central headquarters in the Unbi mountains.

He began to impose harsher punishments against those who refused to obey him, which further increased tensions. The people, led by the Russian-backed opposition leaders, set fire to government buildings and expelled the murtaziqs from the region. On July 16, 1851, the Shapsug region decided to remove all the clergy who were pro-Amin from the administration.

To isolate them from Russian influence, Amin ordered the relocation of the Chemguys, Yegeruqays, and Bzhedugs deeper into the mountains. When Russian forces under General Kovalevsky attempted to halt the resettlement of the Chemguys, Amin forced them to take a new oath of allegiance under Russian artillery fire and marched them up the Laba river. He also attempted to resettle the Besleneys in May 1851, but failed.

On 24 May 1853, fierce clashes took place at Oshkhanuqo between Muhammad Amin and the Russian army. Muhammad Amin withdrew due to artillery fire.

Amin quickly recovered his influence. Anticipating the impending Crimean War, he launched major expeditions in the fall of 1852 against the Gastagaevsky and Tenginsky forts, causing immense confusion among the enemy. Throughout September 1852, his forces relentlessly attacked Russian garrisons on the Black Sea coast, targeting the Navaginskoye, Golovinskoye, Lazarevskoye, and Velyaminovskoye fortifications. In October, backed by 2,000 Ubykh warriors, he threatened to invade Abkhazia, but was ultimately repelled by a Russian amphibious force under Vice-Admiral Serebryakov.

He sent envoys to Istanbul to monitor global politics and secure help. At the Abzakh Congress in the spring of 1852, he stated that the Turks were preparing to fight Russia. In July 1853, before the Crimean War officially began, Amin led a force of ten thousand cavalry and infantry to take control of the Karachay region. He planned to use this territory to link his forces with Imam Shamil through Kabardia and Ossetia. At the same time, his eight-thousand-man unit attacked the Russian fortifications at Gastagaevsky and Tenginsky. The Russian army blocked these initiatives. Once the Crimean War began, Britain, France, and the Ottoman Empire took a sudden interest in the North Caucasus. They sent political and military delegations to the Western Caucasus, hoping to use the local military power against Russia. Amin used this situation to strengthen his position. He announced that the Ottoman Empire had promised him military support, urged all Muslims to unite, and promised to leave the country if he lost the people's trust. He also negotiated with a representative of the French Marshal Saint-Arnaud and the English Admiral Lyons. He demanded an allied landing of 2,000 to 3,000 troops in Circassia. He refused Ottoman requests to send Abzakh warriors to the Ottoman army, insisting that fighting in Circassia was priority.

Muhammad Amin took advantage of the Crimean War to reinstate his rule. He managed to regain control in some parts of his former lands, and strengthened his rule further. By early 1853, Amin had expanded his operations from the Lazarevsky fort up to Gelendzhik and Novorossiysk. In July 1853, Amin amassed an army of 10,000 cavalry and infantry to invade Karachay, intending to establish a base there, march through Kabarda, and physically link up with Imam Shamil's forces in the east. Russian General Evdokimov blocked this strategic march, forcing Amin to pivot towards the Voznesenskaya stanitsa and the Belorechenskoye fortification, where he was repelled. Simultaneously, an 8,000-strong detachment under his commanders fiercely attacked the Gastagaevsky fort on July 26, and the Tenginsky fort on July 23 and 27, though they failed to capture them. On October 24, 1853, his forces engaged General Evdokimov's expedition near Nizhny Gabukai and Khakhpakokhabl, inflicting over 80 casualties on the Russians through stubborn resistance. On 9 October 1853, the Ottoman Sultan sent a letter to Imam Shamil and ordered that he should declare a holy war against Russia. Muhammad Amin took it upon himself to lead the Circassian part of this holy war, and started mobilising against Russia. He started enlisting more soldiers. When news of supposed Ottoman support for Amin spread, the Circassians regrouped under his command. By 1853, the Makhosh, Yegeruqay, Hajret Kabardians, Shapsugs, and Natukhajs had once again submitted to his rule. As the Crimean War continued, Amin raided the Darial Gorge, Karachay, and the Laba region, pressuring Russian forces. In 1855, his troops attacked and destroyed Russian military hubs in the Yekaterinodar area and large Cossack settlements along the Kuban river. Meanwhile, the Ottoman government in Istanbul prepared for war by trying to build an anti-Russian coalition. The Sultan sent sealed letters to pro-Ottoman Georgian princes, Azerbaijani Khans, Imam Shamil, and Muhammad Amin.

==== Civil War, Coup and Exile ====
In 1853, Amin sent a formal appeal to Queen Victoria of the United Kingdom. Meanwhile, Russian forces evacuated their military installations along the Caucasian coastline. Ottoman military units commanded by Mustafa Pasha subsequently occupied the Anapa fortress. Mustafa Pasha convened a council of local Caucasian leaders at the fortress. Due to the political influence of his rival Seferbiy Zaneqo, father of Qarabatir Zaneqo, Amin was excluded from this gathering.

During the meeting, Seferbiy Pasha openly criticized Muhammad Amin, causing Amin's supporters to leave the fortress in protest. The dispute between the two figures resulted in internal political instability. Seferbiy Zaneqo aligned with the traditional feudal system, securing the backing of the Ottoman Sultan, local princes, and the nobility. In contrast, Amin advocated for a democratic state structure with loyalty to Imam Shamil, and mobilized the peasantry and the general working population against the nobles. The broader Circassian population distrusted Zaneqo due to his ties with the aristocracy, preferring Amin's leadership.

During the Crimean War, a major internal conflict emerged in Western Circassia between Muhammad Amin and Seferbiy Zaneqo. While Muhammad Amin had spent years successfully uniting various Circassian regions under a single command, the Ottoman Empire was hesitant to fully support Imam Shamil's movement. Instead of fully backing Muhammad Amin, the Ottoman government decided to create an opposition force. They bestowed the title of "Pasha" and "General Governor" upon Seferbiy Zaneqo, and sent him back to the Caucasus in 1854. Muhammad Amin strictly disagreed with this decision and complained to the Ottoman Grand Vizier in a letter and asked the Ottomans to recognize him. Muhammad Amin's complaint was rejected, and Seferbiy was declared leader of Circassians.

Archival correspondence from the same year reveals Muhammad Amin's communication with Imam Shamil. In a detailed letter, Amin outlined the administrative challenges he faced in the years following his 1848 appointment at the Adagum Khase and the subsequent countermeasures he implemented. He reported his inability to establish communication with the Karachay region despite six separate attempts. Amin detailed the arrival of three large warships from Istanbul, which transported his returning envoys alongside supplies of gunpowder, ammunition, and axes. Furthermore, he mentioned receiving official correspondence from high ranking Ottoman officials, including the grand vizier, sheikh ul-Islam, serasker, and kapudan pasha. The letter recorded the Russian capture of twenty local fortresses and stated Amin's intention to travel to the coast to receive sixteen troop transport ships arriving from Istanbul.

Amin actively dismantled feudal privileges by mandating that nobles swear an oath on the Quran to uphold social equality. While he successfully implemented these reforms among the Abzakh and Ubykh populations without resistance, other groups rejected his policies. Feudal elites systematically withdrew their support upon realizing his anti-feudal objectives. The Natukhaj and Shapsug regions favored Zaneqo's conservative approach. The Bzhedug region also resisted Amin's administrative changes, resulting in an internal armed conflict that led to the deaths of numerous local nobles.

The arrival of Seferbiy split the Circassian resistance into two distinct political and social factions. Muhammad Amin's faction aimed to build a unified, "democratic" Islamic state that abolished traditional feudal privileges. Because of his egalitarian policies, he secured the strong support of the free peasant class and the historically anti-feudal Abzakh region. Seferbiy's faction was strictly tied to the traditional feudal system and relied heavily on the hope of foreign intervention from the Ottoman Empire and Great Britain. He was backed by the traditional nobles who feared losing their societal dominance, as well as the Natukhaj and Shapsug societies who resented Amin's theocratic policies. Seferbiy acquired nominal command over the Shapsug and Natukhaj populations. Muhammad Amin maintained his influence among the Abzakhs, the Bzhedugs, and smaller societies living between the Belaya and Laba rivers. Seferbiy called for Amin's assassination.

Seferbiy continuously worked to undermine Muhammad Amin's authority, regularly sending complaints to the Ottoman government in Istanbul. He also organized an armed, artillery-backed expedition against the Abzakh region with the explicit goal of eliminating Muhammad Amin. However, the expedition failed, and Seferbiy was forced to turn back halfway. Eventually, the anti-Amin faction was taken over by Seferbiy's son, Ibrahim Qarabatir. Qarabatir had been a fierce opponent of Muhammad Amin for years, referring to Muhammad Amin as "God's curse".

In March 1855, near the river of Shebzh, the first battle between the factions of Muhammad Amin and Seferbiy Zaneqo took place. In 1855, Muhammad Amin forced the Bzhedug aristocrats to take an oath to renounce their rights. Many princes and nobles were massacred and robbed by the Bzhedug commoners.

Acting independently, Amin made his boldest attempt to seize Karachay and unite with Shamil in August 1855. He was intercepted by Russian General Kozlovsky. On August 25, 1855, Kozlovsky personally led an attack on Amin's fortified position at Kadyko, decisively defeating the Naib and driving him out of Karachay. Despite this, Amin rallied 10,000 men in the Maykop gorge in October 1855, initiating gradual siege operations against the Belorechenskoye fortification and other outposts.

Amin pleaded with the Ottoman government directly multiple times, asking for Ottoman military support as well as recognition of his rule over Circassia. Eventually, the Sultan granted Imam Shamil the title "Khan of Khans" and elevated Muhammad Amin to the rank of Beylerbeyi (Governor-General). He was officially granted the title of "Pasha" in September 1855. This title was awarded in recognition of his success in uniting Circassia. He was also awarded the Order of the Medjidie.

In May 1856 another battle took place on the banks of the Sup River. The ongoing civil war with Seferbiy and his son severely hindered Amin's ability to fight the Russians. The Circassian elders, who wanted to stop the hostility, increased the pressure on their leaders. Seferbiy and Muhammad Amin were forced to swear an oath to the people that they would go to the Sultan and demand that he resolve their dispute over authority. Seeking a definitive political resolution, Muhammad Amin secretly traveled to Istanbul in April 1857 with an Abzakh delegation to make another direct appeal to the Ottoman government. However, due to intense Russian diplomatic pressure, the Ottoman Ministry of Foreign Affairs placed him under house arrest shortly after he arrived. Under the guise of being a "guest of the state," he was separated from his delegation and exiled to Damascus, Syria, as a "consultant to the Damascus Governorate", stuck in a "forced paradise", with a high-rank and a salary, but no freedom to return to Circassia. Thus, he was effectively removed from power.

==== Return to Circassia and Negotiations with Russia ====
Amin was guaranteed a comfortable life in Damascus with a large salary, but wished to return to Circassia. He engineered an escape plan from his exile in Damascus. After two months of wandering through the mountains and deserts of the Middle East, avoiding robberies and attacks by Arab and Kurdish nomads, Amin reached the Black Sea coast in the town of Giresun. Upon reaching the Black Sea coast, barely escaping the Ottoman authorities, he purchased a small boat and secretly sailed back to Circassia, arriving on November 28, 1857. He returned to the Abzakh region and reclaimed his leadership. He was greeted positively by the Abzakhs, who expressed anger at the Ottoman government for his treatment. He made some final efforts to establish his absolute authority on the entirety of Circassia, but was unsuccessful. Despite returning to Circassia to resume his leadership, Muhammad Amin found himself increasingly isolated as he had lost his absolute authority and promised foreign assistance failed to materialize. Muhammad Amin's offensive operations against the Russian forces were paralyzed by the construction of the Maikop and Khamkety fortifications. These Russian military advances forced the surrounding societies to submit to Russian authority. The ongoing Circassian genocide had severely hindered resistance as well. The resistance began to rapidly collapse on all fronts. According to his autobiography, Muhammad Amin lost hope by this point and concluded the best option was to enter peace negotiations with Russia, but since his mentor Shamil was still fighting in Dagestan, he felt ashamed to do so before him; thus he continued futile resistance for 3 more years.

Qarabatir's faction and Amin's faction directly clashed in 1857 near the Tuapse pass. The skirmish resulted in fifteen deaths on each side and forty wounded. Unwilling to see more bloodshed between the Circassians, Muhammad Amin chose to pull his forces back. An April 1858 meeting in Abzakh territory failed to bring about a reconciliation between the pro-Amin and pro-Zaneqo factions. Following a national assembly the same month, Amin expanded his authority and appointed Hadji-Hasan as the head of the newly established judicial district in Tuapse. Hadji-Hasan was a former slave, which enraged the local nobles, who killed the appointee and revolted against Amin.

In the Eastern Caucasus, Russian forces under Prince Baryatinski besieged Imam Shamil's final stronghold of Gunib, forcing Imam Shamil to surrender on September 6, 1859. Amin was personally affected after hearing of Shamil's surrender. According to some accounts, Shamil advised Amin to make peace as there was no hope left. According to other accounts, Shamil, while in captivity, wrote to Amin that he was free to continue the struggle or end it. Amin favored ending it; he believed it was impossible to win and did not want the civilian population to be harmed any further. He theorised that the Russian army would now focus all its forces in Circassia and concluded that further resistance was useless, and that peace with Russia was the only way to save the remaining Circassian population from total annihilation. He convened a Khase council at Adagum, which was only attended by Abzakh leaders, as the Ubykhs and Shapsugs refused to respond. He delivered a speech and pleaded with Circassians:

Hundreds of our villages were burned and massacred. Their inhabitants were displaced. At the end of every battle thousands of women were widowed and children orphaned. To avoid an even greater catastrophe, let us make peace, as Imam Shamil did. Please think carefully! Let us not destroy our existence and honor because of our pride.

After long discussions, the Abzakh agreed to a peace deal. On November 20, 1859, Amin and a 24-member Abzakh delegation met with Russian commander Filipson. Out of respect for the naib, Russian soldiers reportedly took off their hats as he passed by. The negotiations lasted for three days. Amin managed to negotiate a treaty where the Abzakh would be safe from Russian attacks, would have the right to keep their land forever, with a specific guarantee that no part of their territory would be taken for the construction of Cossack stanitsas, their religion and right to make hajj would be respected, they were permanently exempted from paying taxes, from military conscription, and were granted the right to maintain their internal administration and courts according to their traditional customs. Amin would also be paid a monthly pension to pay for his needs. At the request of the elders, the Russians allowed Muhammad Amin to remain among the Abzakh on equal terms with the elders, without special authority. The delegation was subsequently sent to Tbilisi and then to St. Petersburg in 1860, where they were received by Tsar Alexander II. During the audience, Muhammad Amin addressed the Tsar, vouching for the Circassians. After the treaty was signed, the delegation returned to the Taman region, but Amin separated from the group. He made a final speech to the Abzakh delegation:

You believed in me, followed me for years. I will never forget this. Give my greetings and best wishes to the Abzakh people. Please forgive my mistakes!

Sources state that Muhammad Amin considered Circassia as his second homeland. In some correspondences he stated, "I too can be considered an Abzakh." However, many among the Abzakh later accused Muhammad Amin of being a traitor who sold them out to Russia. In March 1860, Amin, his younger brother Abu Bakr, and 13 Circassian elders traveled to St. Petersburg. Amin spent some of April 1860 in St. Petersburg, where he met Emperor Alexander II. On April 28, 1860, Amin traveled to Kaluga to meet Shamil. According to eyewitnesses, they hugged each other, spoke about politics and the features of the Adyghe language. Amin stayed for three days before traveling to Odessa and returning to the Abzakh. During this time, Amin attempted to create peace deals between Circassians and Russians to prevent the exile of Circassians to the Ottoman Empire. According to other accounts, he lived in Circassia as an ordinary imam until 1861, secretly fighting against Russia. In March 1861, Amin realized his inability to influence the situation in Circassia any further, and decided to make a pilgrimage to Mecca and settle in Turkey. He sent men to Dagestan to retrieve his sick wife and relatives. In late April, learning his relatives had arrived in Kerch, Amin went to meet his family. Hostile Abzakh elders from the Psekups valley attempted to intercept him, but Bzhedug horsemen safely escorted him to Kerch, from where he went to Turkey.

After Amin's final departure to Turkey, the Russian Empire never fulfilled the promises made to Muhammad Amin; instead, they were already planning the complete removal of the native population from the Western Caucasus to give the land to Russian and Cossack settlers. The peace agreement between the Abzakh and Russia was a tactical deception by the Russian military; the Commander-in-Chief of the Caucasus Army, General Baryatinsky, later stated that his goal in making the "treaty" was to neutralize the Abzakhs and ensure they committed no hostile acts that year. Thus the Russian military used negotiations with him merely as a stalling tactic to prepare for a massive, final assault on Circassia. General Filipson argued that the treaty could have peacefully secured the submission of remaining Circassians, but the Russian military command dismissed this proposal in favor of total destruction of the Circassians. Many Abzakh Circassians were forced to a death march in the winter.

=== Life in exile ===
==== Activism for Circassia Abroad ====
Upon arriving in Istanbul, Amin was received with great honor by Sultan Abdulmejid I, who arranged his marriage to a Circassian woman, granted him a state salary and a house in the Unkapanı (Zeyrek) district. The Ottoman government bestowed upon him the rank of lieutenant general and the nickname Nail ("Worthy"), a play on "Naib".

After his exile to Turkey, Muhammad Amin intended to support the Circassian cause from abroad. In Istanbul, he met with Polish representative Adam Czartoryski to negotiate the formation of Polish legions in Circassia, though this plan failed due to a lack of funding. Amin gave up any hopes for resistance after this. In early 1862, a delegation led by Ubykh leader Ipa-Dziash from the newly formed Parliament of Independence arrived in Istanbul, asking Amin to return to the Caucasus and lead a renewed uprising. However, Amin advised the delegation to make a temporary pact with the Russians to prevent bloodshed, the loss of their homeland and the mass deportation of their people. The assembly ignored this advice and continued fighting until the 1864 Battle of Qbaada. Muhammad Amin repeated his advice of peace in his later communications to the Caucasus. However, Amin's decision to surrender was a pragmatic one, due to lack of means to continue the resistance. In 1863, while residing in Istanbul, Muhammad Amin met with Vladislav Jordan, a Polish representative stationed in the Ottoman Empire. During this encounter, he told Jordan that if he possessed the material means to maintain just 500 horsemen for a few months, he would raise the entire North Caucasus to struggle again.

==== Retirement and Mental Illness ====
Muhammad Amin had made many enemies due to his dictatorial rule and eventual surrender to Russia, according to some accounts, he was worried Circassians would hunt him down; and indeed some blamed him for the Circassian exodus and tried to assassinate him during his exile in Turkey, but none succeeded.

In Istanbul, Muhammad Amin began suffering from a severe nervous illness. Seeking a quieter environment for his health, he sold his Istanbul mansion and moved his family to the village of Karabiga (Yeni Çiftlik) near the Marmara coast. As per his surrender agreement, the Russian government paid him a pension. Despite this, he attempted to organise Circassian societies in the region. The consequences of his surrender continued to haunt Amin, causing him to have a guilty conscience and have mental breakdowns. In one case, stopping at a port in Egypt during a pilgrimage, Amin was given his pension by the Russian consul in Egypt. After receiving the money, Amin felt guilty and had a severe mental breakdown, throwing the bag of coins into the sea. He cried about "how he could answer to God about this". His nephew had to lock him in the ship, and the crisis lasted 15 days. He did not get better back in Turkey, because of his unstable condition, caring for him became too difficult, prompting the family to relocate to the city of Bursa. In Bursa, he married his third wife, Hajji Fatma, and entered commercial life. Pooling his and his wife's resources, he purchased a large commercial inn in the Tahtakale district, which became historically known as the "Çerkes Hanı" (Circassian Inn). To secure a permanent and peaceful residence, he subsequently bought a 400-decare farm in the nearby village of Armutköy, where several other Circassian and Dagestani immigrants had also settled. During his time in Armutköy, Muhammad Amin built the village mosque and founded the "Circassian cemetery" specifically for Caucasian exilees. However, his financial matters did not go well.

In Armutköy, Amin continued to suffer from periodic nervous fits. According to reports, during these episodes, he would be locked until he got better, his relatives would dress up as gendarmerie and shout at him to make him docile and go to his room. He would be terrified and reply "yes, master, I'm going".

The Russian ambassador to Turkey personally delivered Amin's pension to Armutköy. Despite this, Amin hated Russia until the end of his life. During one such visit, the ambassador and his family arrived in a phaeton. Seeing the Russians and their wives wearing hats through the window, Amin spat at them and cursed in Avar: "Tuu, malhIunal!" ("Tfu, cursed ones!").

In 1866, Muhammad Amin's son approached the Russian consulate with a request to settle in Kabarda. The son stated that he wished to enter the service of his relatives because his father's poverty prevented him from obtaining a good education in Constantinople. The Russian authorities denied the request.

When his son Davud-bey died on a ship returning from the Hajj, the ship's captain attempted to follow maritime law and bury the body at sea. The family blocked the crew, intimidating the captain by declaring: "If you want to know, this is not someone you throw into the sea. This is the son of Naib-Pasha and the son-in-law of Imam Shamil!" They forced the crew to bring the body to Izmir.

Grave and memorial of Muhammad Amin Asiyalav located in Armutköy, Bursa, Turkey.

==== Death ====
Amin spent his final decades living in Armutköy. He died due to his mental condition, from a nervous system disorder. There are conflicting accounts of his death. Most accounts state that he died in the village on April 8, 1901; this is also the date on his mausoleum in Armutköy. He was buried in the village's "Beyler Mezarlığı" (Lords' Cemetery) alongside his daughter, Behice Hanım (who died in Hijri 1316), and his sister, Nefise Hanım (who died in Hijri 1342). The upkeep of the grave site was organized by retired Turkish generals of Caucasian descent. Following his death, eight of the fifteen households that had originally settled with him in Armut village relocated once more, migrating to Damascus (Şam).

Around the same years as Amin's death, his old rival, Qarabatir Zaneqo, who was also exiled to Turkey, had died during a return trip from Mecca.

== Legacy ==
Muhammad Amin was a controversial figure among the Circassians. He aimed to unite the Circassians, who lacked a developed state structure and relied on local governance, under a single authority to establish order and his efforts were seen as highly threatening by the Russian administration. During his rule, he used oppressive methods to maintain order and drew criticism from many groups which eventually led to a decline in his support.

According to some sources who were hostile to Amin, there was a type of intention (niyyah) called the "Naib intention" among the Circassians, who were forced by the Naib to perform prayers:

"This is called the Naib namaz; they force us to perform it, may those who make us do it never see the face of goodness."

Another folk narrative describes Muhammad Amin as follows:

"The Naib's namaz is a forced oath,

The Naib's banner is Murtaziq's whip,

First he makes you swear, then throws you into prison,

Naib comes down upon those who have fallen under God's wrath.

Oh, where shall we go?"

Other sources question these narratives, accusing them of being Russian fabrications.

Turkish Major Osman-bey, who served alongside Muhammad Amin during the Crimean War, described Amin as "a tall man with a Herculean build whose facial features resembled those of Julius Caesar, though rougher. He had piercing, eagle-like eyes and tightly compressed lips that signaled an inflexible will and a fearlessness that would not retreat before any obstacle or danger". Osman-bey compared Muhammad Amin to other figures:

The courage of this fanatic far exceeds the actions of Kossuth, Garibaldi, Jefferson Davis, and others, who only advanced when they had large sums of money, a wealth of materials, or thousands of partisans at their disposal.... Meanwhile, he undertook the conquest of the Circassians armed with nothing but a staff, and despite this, in a short time, built a strong faction for himself, crushed all who had the audacity to stand in his way, reigning as an absolute ruler.

=== In Literature ===
Amin's biography was included on page 1968 of the Saudi Arabian encyclopedic anthology "al-Mukhtar al-masun min a'lami al-kurun" (compiled by Muhammad Musa), which detailed biographies of legendary Islamic scholars. There, he is called "Muhammad Amin al-Avari".

Kumyk poet Abdurrahman Gaziev wrote about Amin:

You, the honest Naib of Imam Shamil,

Went there with great missions.

Your heartfelt loyalty to the Imam,

You showed through the organizations you founded.

They loved you in the Circassian homeland,

They believed in your every word.

By calling them to Gazawat-Jihad,

You gave courage to their hearts.

Avar poet Muhammed Ahmedov also wrote about him:

I am Muhammad Amin, Shamil is my leader,

Imam of Circassia, a son of the Avars.

Though my name may remain hidden and unspoken,

I am always in the hearts of my people.

Even the light of the brightest shining star,

Reaches the world quite late, so they say.

Siraceddin Haybullahev and Muhammedkamil Himatov dedicated this poem to him:

Though my grave is in Turkey,

My heart and my place are always Dagestan.

I call out to all peoples:

Do not bow down to anyone but Allah!

Avar poet Mashidat Gayirbekova wrote this poem about him:

To the nations that had forgotten

The religion of the believers,

The scholar who spread Islam

Through the path of the Tariqa.

With no relatives by his side,

Far away from any help,

The Imam of the Adyghe-Circassians,

Muhammad Amin.

=== Mausoleum ===
In 2016, the Bursa Metropolitan Municipality completed a project which involved the maintenance and repair of the historical graves adjacent to Armutköy Mosque. Following these preservation efforts, Muhammad Amin's mausoleum reopened to the public with a ceremonial gathering. The mausoleum has become a frequent visiting site for people of Caucasian descent, and visitors travel from the Caucasus region specifically to pay their respects at his grave. It is also a site of ziyarat.
