= Chemguys =

Circassian tribe

КIэмгуй
- The tamga of the Boletoqo princely dynasty of the Chemguy and the Circassian flag

Regions with significant populations
- Russia (Adygea); Turkey

Languages
- Adyghe, Russian, Turkish

Religion
- Islam

Related ethnic groups
- Other Adyghe tribes, Abkhaz, Abaza

The Chemguy, (Note: Adyghe: КIэмгуй [tʃ'ɐmɣʷɘj], КIэмыргъуэй [tʃ'ɐmɘrɣʷɐj], or КIьэмгуе; Turkish: Çemguylar Kemirguveyler) (also called Chemirgoy by Kabardians and Temirgoy (Note: Russian: Темиргоевцы, pronounced [tʲɪmʲɪrgɐˈjeft͡sɨ]) by Russians) are one of the twelve major Circassian tribes, representing one of the twelve stars on the green-and-gold Circassian flag. They lived between the lower flows of the Belaya and Laba Rivers and their lands extended north to the Kuban. After the end of the Caucasian War, most Chemguy resettled in other Circassian villages (e.g. Bzhedugii, Kabarda, Urupskiy), as well as in Turkey and in other parts of the Middle East. In Turkey, the majority of the population of the village Hadzhimukohabl (now Dondukovskaya) are Chemguy. While there are many Chemguys in Adygea, Chemguys have the lowest populated diaspora community out of all Circassian tribes.

The Chemguy live mainly in Adygea. The Chemguy dialect of Adyghe (КIэмыргъуэйбзэ), as well as the Bzhedug dialect, are the main languages of the Circassians in the Republic of Adygea.

== History ==
The Chemguys were one of the strongest and most powerful Circassian tribes. Sources note that Chemguy tribe was richer than its neighbors. They cultivated cattle breeding and agriculture: millet, corn, wheat, rye and sunflower. Class differentiation in Chemguy tribe was very clear. The most important family of princely origin was Boletoqo, which was ruling the Chemguy, Yegeruko and Mamheg tribes. After the Caucasian war many Chemguy left for Turkey.

== See also ==
- Circassians § Tribes
- Shapsugs
- Bzhedug
- Abzakhs
- Zhaney
- Mamkhegh
- Natukhaj
- Hatuqay
- Besleney
