= Eugène Deully =

French painter (1860–1933)

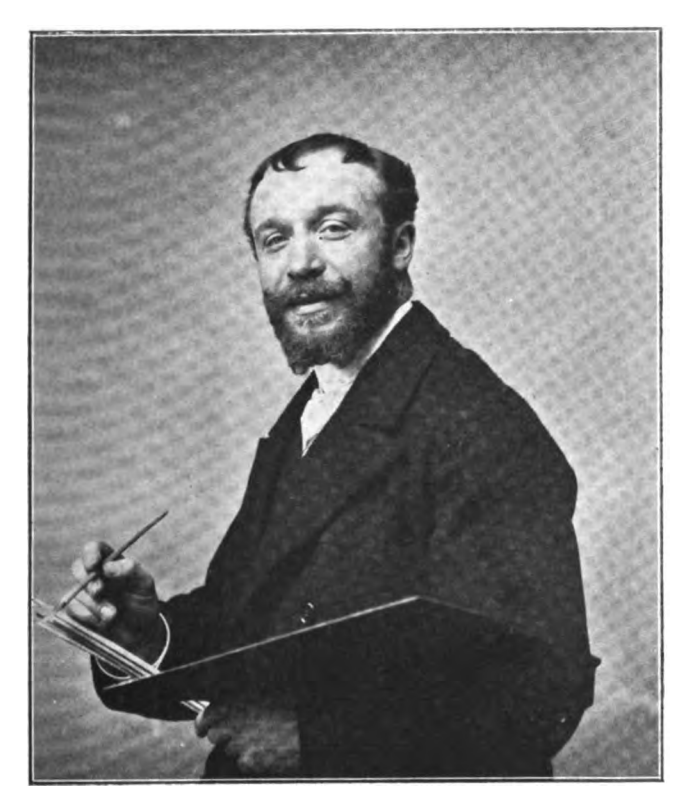
- Photographic portrait (before 1906)
- Born: 16 November 1860; Lille, Nord
- Died: 6 December 1933 (aged 73); Paris
- Awards: Legion of Honour (Officer); Order of Leopold (Officer)

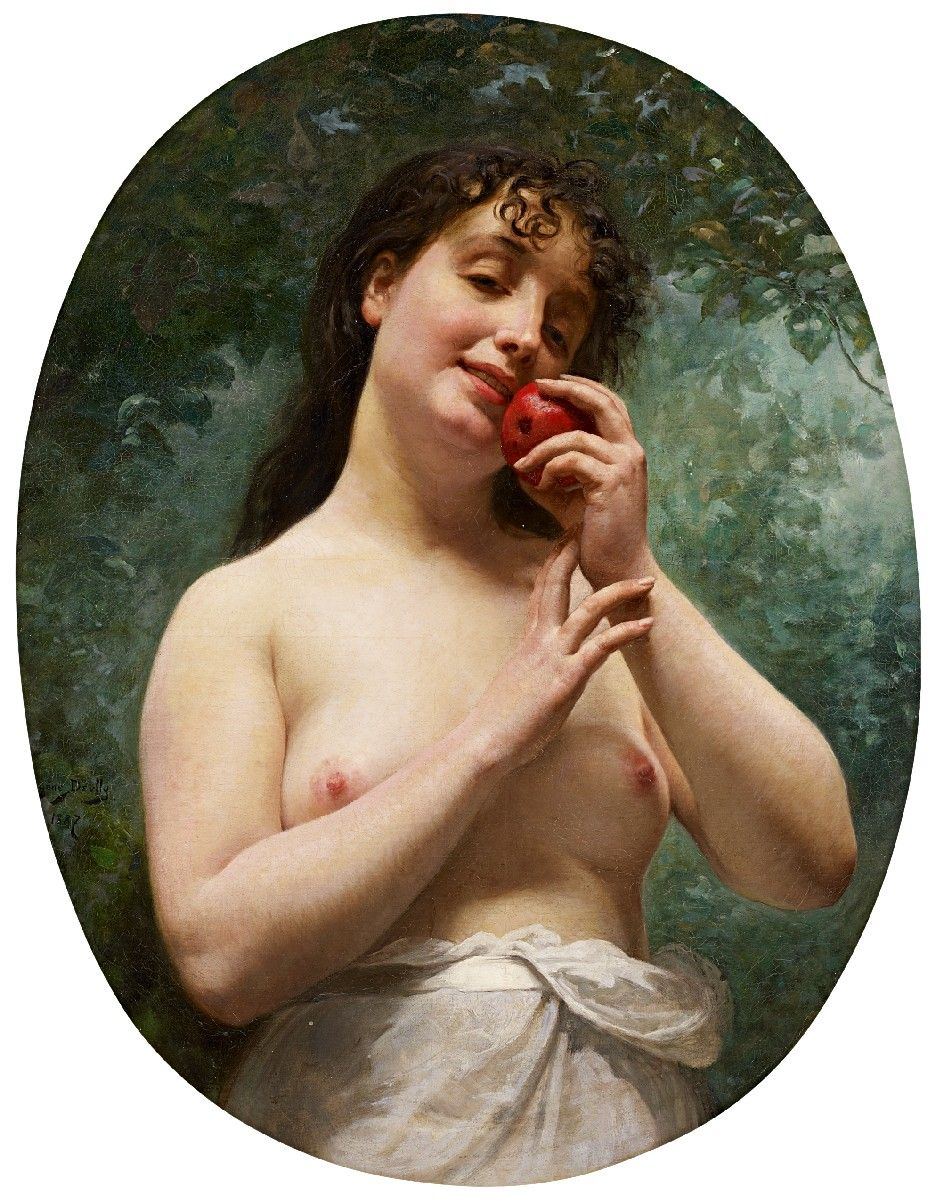
Eve (1887)

Eugène Auguste François Deully (1860–1933) was a French painter of genre scenes and figures.

== Life ==
Deully was born in Lille on 16 November 1860. He studied in Paris at the École nationale supérieure des arts décoratifs and the École nationale supérieure des Beaux-Arts, and under Jean Léon Gérôme, Auguste Barthélemy Glaize and Léon Glaize.

He initially painted symbolist, religious and mythological subjects; later, he produced numerous portraits and genre scenes. He exhibited from 1887 at the Paris Salon, winning an award with merit in 1888, a third-class medal in 1889, and a first-class medal in 1892. He exhibited at the 1900 Exposition Universelle in Paris, where he won a bronze medal.

Deully received a travel bursary in 1892 to visit Italy, the Netherlands and Belgium. He was then the drawing teacher at the Collège Sainte-Barbe for a time. From 1897 to 1912 he was chief conservator at the Musée des Beaux-Arts de Lille. He was made an Officer of the Legion of Honour in 1927.

He died at his home in the 14th arrondissement of Paris on 6 December 1933.

== Collections ==
- Musée des Beaux-Arts de Tourcoing: Les Tourments de Saint Jérôme ('The Torments of Saint Jerome'), 1889;
- Musée de la Chartreuse de Douai: Orphée ('Orpheus'), 1892;
- Musée des Beaux-Arts de Dunkerque: Pommiers en fleurs ('Apple Blossoms'), 1913;
- Musée de l'hôtel Sandelin: Portrait de Jean-Pierre, baron du Teil (after Alfred de Jaubert, Musée Versailles).

== General and cited references ==
- "1933, Décès. 14D 391 (17/31)". Archives de Paris. (n.d.). Retrieved 24 April 2022.
- Lobstein, Dominique (2021). "Deully, Eugène-Auguste-François". In Andreas Beyer, Bénédicte Savoy and Wolf Tegethoff (eds.). Allgemeines Künstlerlexikon. Berlin, New York: K. G. Saur. De Gruyter.
- Oliver, Valerie Cassel, ed. (2011). "Deully, Eugène Auguste François". In Benezit Dictionary of Artists. Oxford Art Online.
- Thieme, Ulrich, ed. (1913). "Deully, Eugène Auguste Françoi". In Allgemeines Lexikon der Bildenden Künstler von der Antike bis zur Gegenwart, Vol. 9: Delaulne–Dubois. Leipzig: E. A. Seemann. p. 168.
