= Rupert Bunny =

Australian painter (1864–1947)

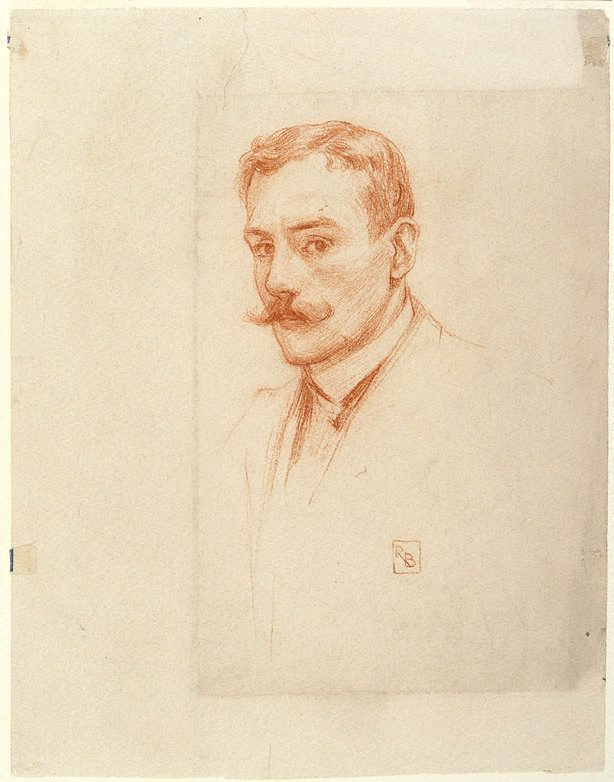
- Self-portrait, 1895
- Born: Rupert Charles Wulsten Bunny; 29 September 1864; Melbourne, Australia
- Died: 25 May 1947 (aged 82); Melbourne, Australia
- Education: National Gallery of Victoria Art School (1881–1883), St John's Wood Art School (1884), Studies under Jean-Paul Laurens, Paris (1886–1888)
- Known for: Painting
- Spouse: Jeanne Morel

Rupert Charles Wulsten Bunny (29 September 1864 – 25 May 1947) was an Australian painter. Born and raised in Melbourne, Victoria, he achieved success and critical acclaim as an expatriate in fin-de-siècle Paris. He gained an honourable mention at the Paris Salon of 1890 with his painting Tritons and a bronze medal at the Paris Exposition Universelle in 1900 with his Burial of St Catherine of Alexandria. The French state acquired 13 of his works for the Musée du Luxembourg and regional collections. He was a "sumptuous colourist and splendidly erudite painter of ideal themes, and the creator of the most ambitious Salon paintings produced by an Australian."

== Early life and education ==
Bunny was the third son of Brice Frederick Bunny, a British Victorian county court judge, and his German mother, Marie Hedwig Dorothea Wulsten. He was born in St Kilda, Melbourne. He had an affluent and privileged upbringing.

He also had an older sister, Alice, born in 1859. She married Henry Leishman, and English immigrant, and settled with him in Queensland before moving to Albany, Western Australia in 1892, and died in Perth in 1951. Their homestead and farm, Springmount, is now heritage listed.

During his childhood, Bunny had an extended trip in Europe, which lasted two years. He returned to Australia trilingual, in English, French and German.

In early 1881, Bunny was enrolled into the University of Melbourne, intending to study civil engineering. Instead, Bunny began his artistic training in 1881 to 1883 in Melbourne at the National Gallery School of Design under O.R. Campbell and George Folingsby. He studied alongside artists such as Fred McCubbin, Aby Altson and John Longstaff. In 1884, at age 20, he moved to London to continue his artistic education. He studied under Phillip Calderon at St Johns Wood Art School for 18 months. Upon meeting the French academic history painter Jean-Paul Laurens in London, Bunny enrolled in Laurens' atelier in Paris, where he studied for 2 years until 1886. Finishing his artistic training, he studied under Pierre Paul Léon Glaize at the Académie Colarossi in 1890.

Critics give responsibility to his cosmopolitan childhood for his ability to assimilate easily into Parisian society and its artistic circles, unlike many other expatriates. He was well respected in Paris, where he remained until 1932.

== Career ==
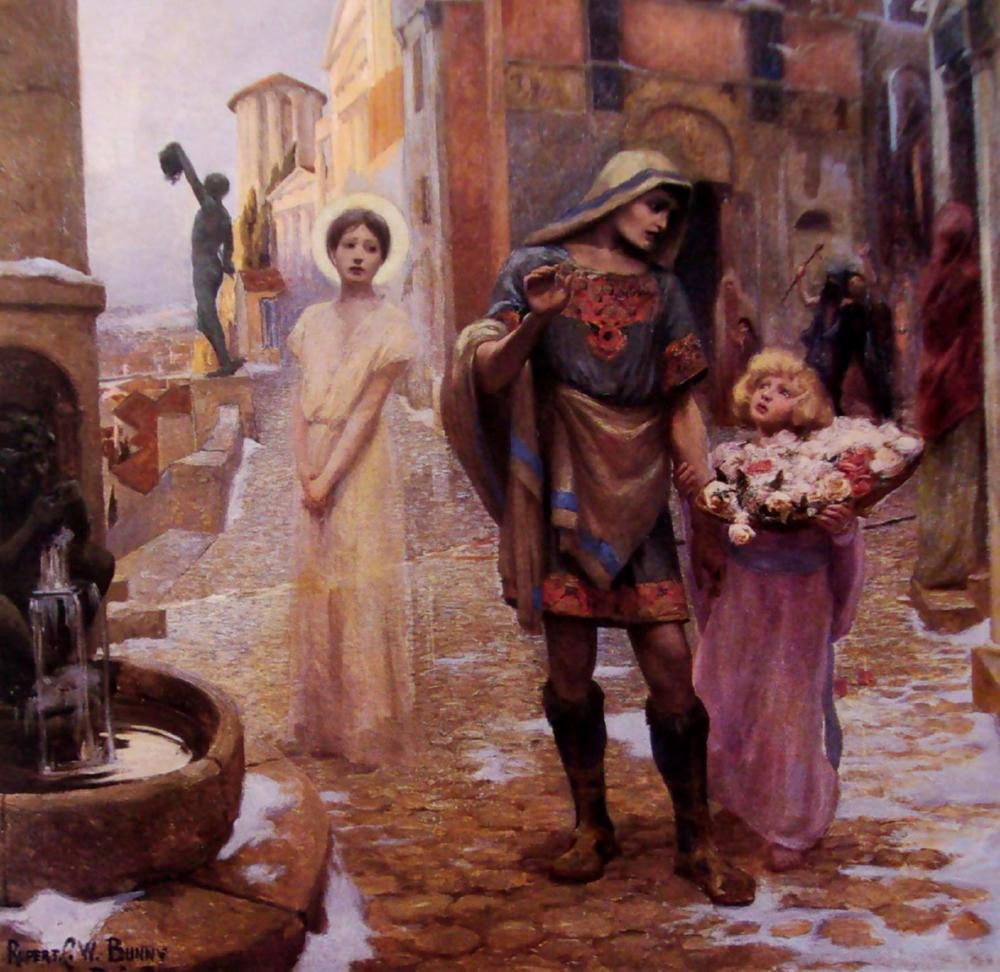
The Roses of Saint Dorothea (circa 1892)

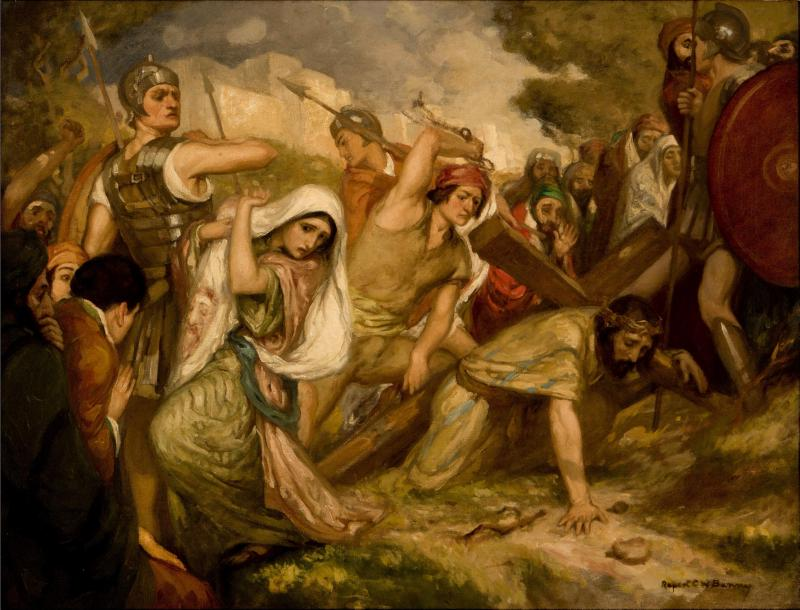
Saint Veronica (circa 1902)

Bunny had a traditional and academic education in the arts under Calderon and Laurens. Despite this, Bunny's artistic practice was heavily influenced by, and imitated, his contemporaries. While he was not an avant gardist, Bunny was a modern artist. His early works, before the turn of the century, are described as 'neo-classical style touched with Pre-Raphaelitism' or as symbolist. Mythology, both Christian and classical, provided the subjects for these paintings, seen in the paintings Tritons (circa 1890) and The Descent From the Cross (circa 1898). The paintings showed an amalgamation of his traditional training, through the technicality, with the more experimental style of the Europeans at the time, seen in the sensibility.

Meeting his wife, Jeanne Heloise Morel, in 1895, his style shifted to a Pre-Raphaelite depiction of romantic, indolent female figures. Morel was continually depicted in these paintings, and has been referred to as Bunny's "eternal muse", such as in the works Returning from the garden (1906) and Jeanne (1902). These depictions of angelic women suggested the influence of British Pre-Raphaelites John Everett Millais and Dante Gabriel Rossetti.

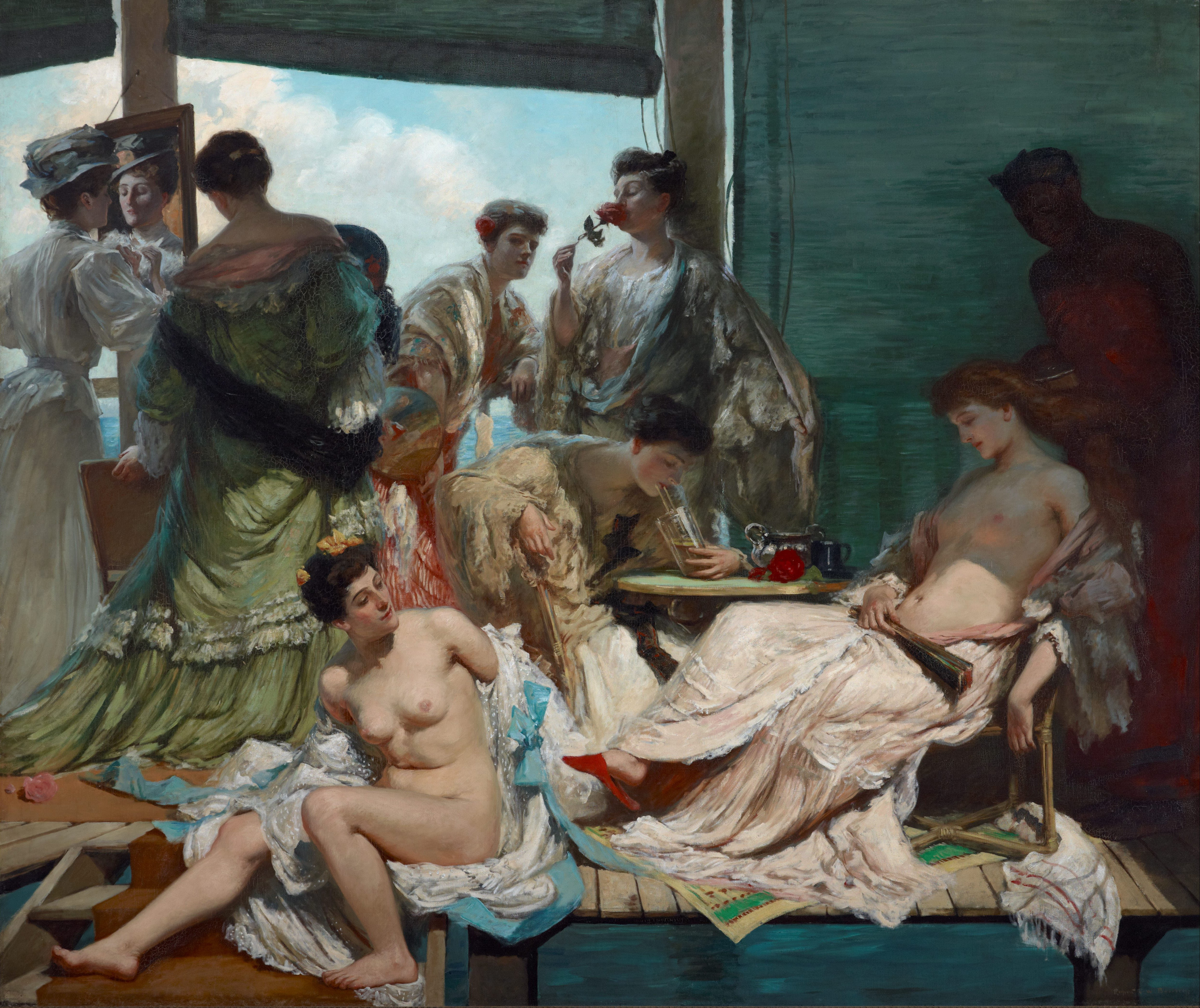
Summer time (circa 1907)

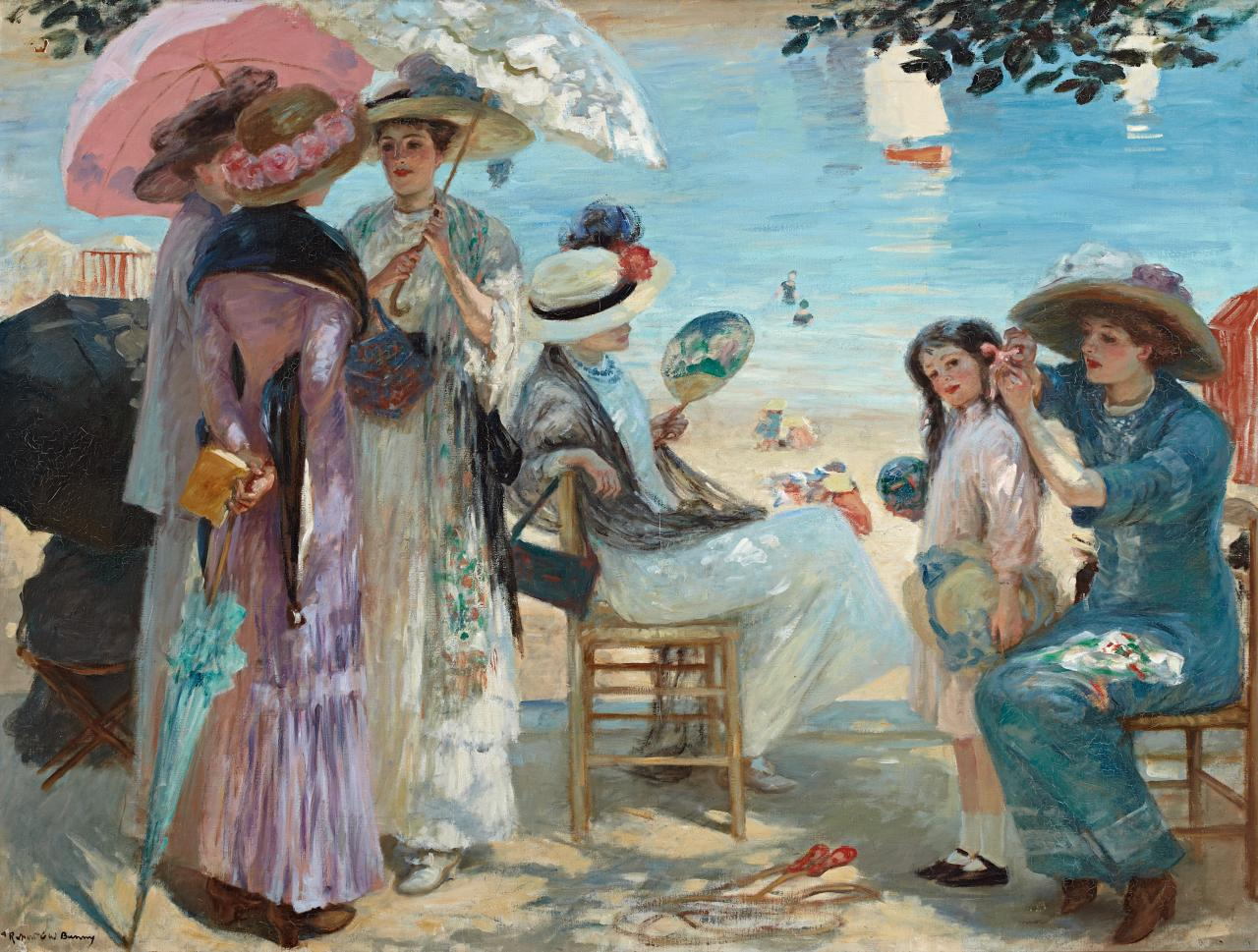
Beautiful afternoon in Royan (circa 1910)

In 1901 he left the Salon de la Société des Artistes Français for the Société Nationale des Beaux-Arts. This saw a change in Bunny's style. With growing critical and financial success, Bunny began exploring modernity in his works such as In the Luxembourg Gardens (circa 1909). The leisure and languor of the belle-epoque pervaded his paintings, which almost exclusively depicted beautiful women. Bunny married Morel in 1902, and, in both style and sensibility, his works became distinctively more French.

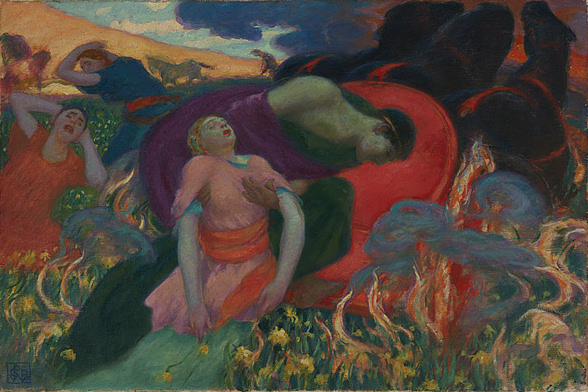
The Rape of Persephone (L'enlèvement de Perséphone) (circa 1913)

Back in Australia in 1912, Bunny joined a group of professional painters who broke from the Victorian Artists' Society over its inclusion of amateurs as members to create the Australian Art Association. Other founders included Louis McCubbin (elected as President in 1912, Norman Macgeorge (second president), James Ranalph Jackson, Leslie Wilkie, William Dunn Knox (from 1919, Norman Macgeorge, Alexander Colquhoun, Napier Waller, Charles Wheeler, Henry Bromilow ('Harry') Harrison, and Charles Web Gilbert, W. B. McInnes, Leslie Wilkie, Edward Officer (Secretary in 1914). Clara Southern became the first woman to join the Association and the first to serve on its committee. George Bell joined the committee in 1922.

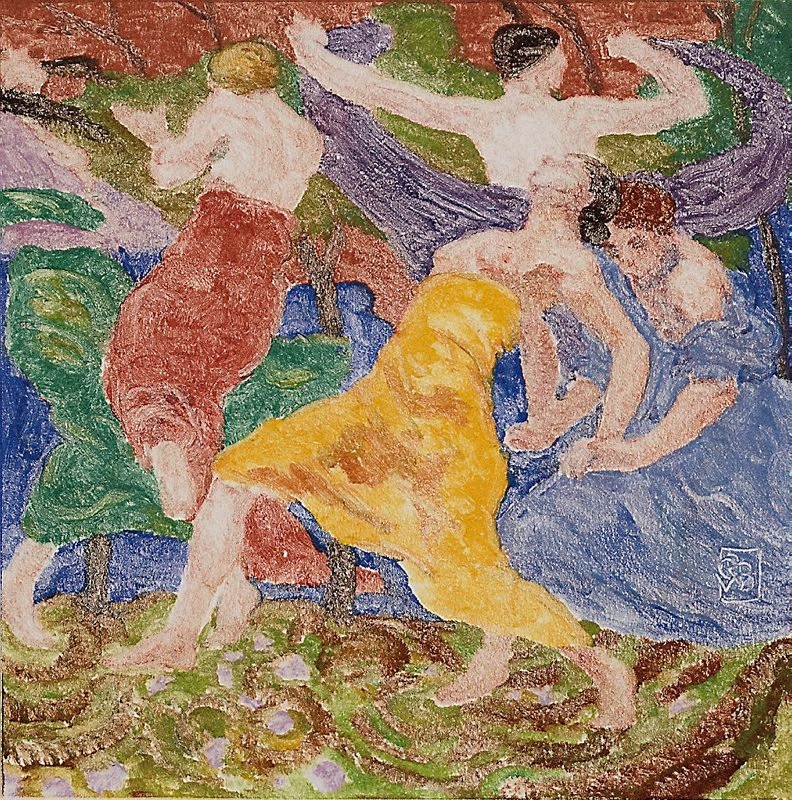
Fresque (1921)

Continually adjusting his oeuvre to reflect the changing styles seen in Europe, especially Paris during the early 20th century, Bunny's artistic style changed again. Sydney Morning Herald art critic John McDonald opined that Bunny "was not a painter of timeless masterpieces, but a versatile professional, ever alert to the changing currents of art fashion." Particularly influenced by Matisse and Sergei Diaghilev's Ballets Russes, Bunny's works developed into compositions with "heightened colour and abstracted, rhythmical forms". This is seen in many works including Salomé (circa 1919), Bell Dance (circa 1920) and Fresque (circa 1921). His painting The Rape of Persephone (circa 1913) was described by artist and critic George Bell as "a glorious riot of colour from the finest imaginative Australia has produced". Towards the 1920s, Bunny revisited mythology as his subject, this time in a modernist style.

In the late 1920s, Bunny painted many landscapes, including Waterfront, Bandol (1929) and Cemetery, South of France (1920s).

Music was a significant influence over Bunny's art. His mother was a "talented" piano player, and friend of Clara Schumann and Bunny has been described as an "exceptional" piano player himself. In his career, he painted many portraits of notable musicians, including Nellie Melba, Percy Grainger and Ada Crossley. He also produced works such as Nocturne [The Distant Song] (circa 1908), The Sonata (circa 1910), and Moonlight Sonata (circa 1907), with obvious allusions to music.

Bunny's art continually spoke to a cosmopolitan, cultured audience. His subject matter which portrays mythology, musical and literary allusions and modern dance are suited to "a leisured class of viewers". This was a meditated choice, and is evidence of Bunny's understanding of the market his artworks targeted, namely the middle and upper classes.

Like many artists living and working in Paris during the early 20th century, Bunny had an interest in the Orient. He painted a portrait of Japanese actress Madame Sadayakko, titled Madame Sada Yakko as Kesa (circa 1900), which depicted the actress in character from Kesa, an adaptation of a Kabuki play entitled Endo Musha. The portrait was praised by Le Figaro's critic for its accurate tone. "By employing a lexicon of orientalism and Japonisme, Bunny tapped into a timeless, borderless belle époque mood".

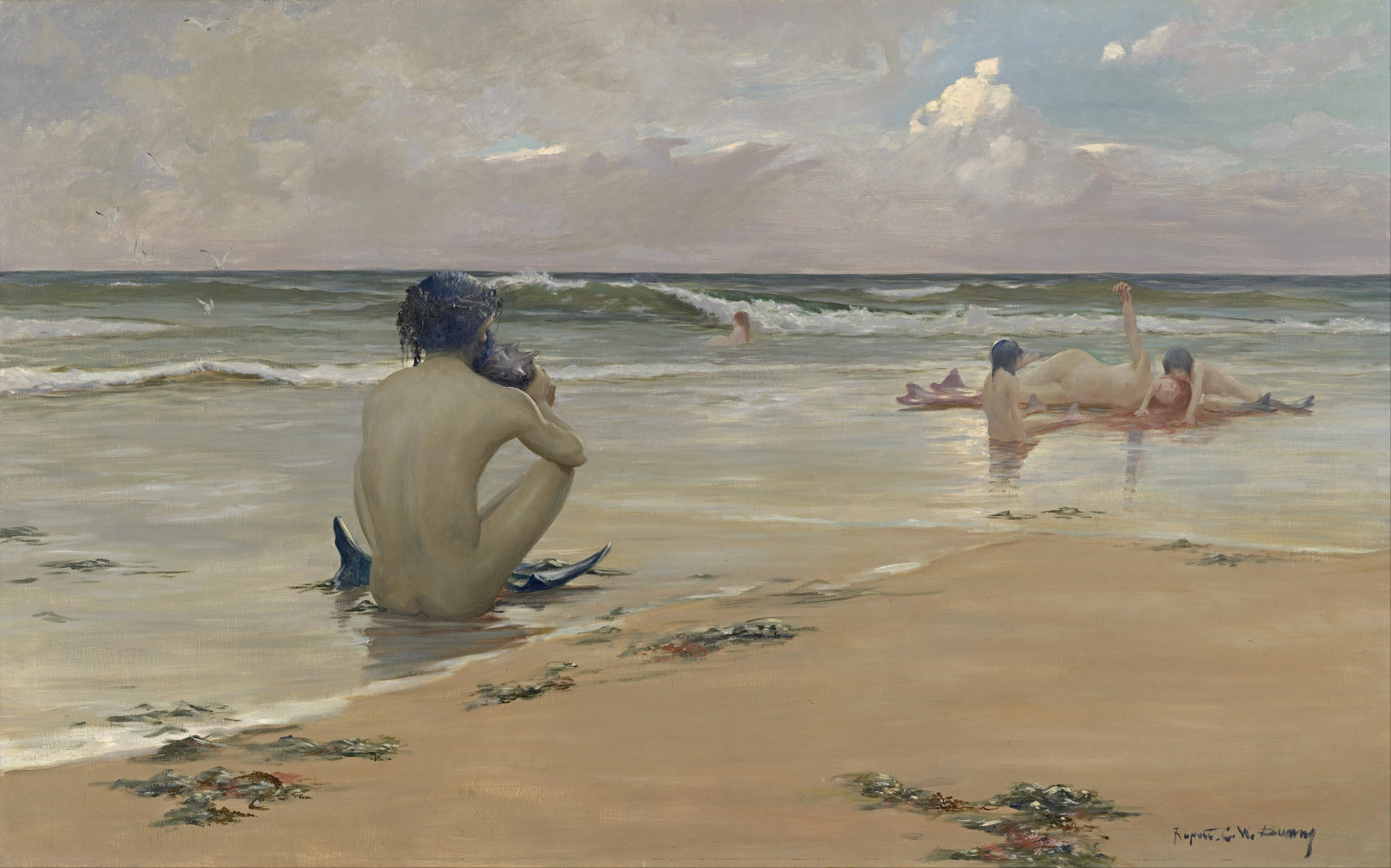
Sea idyll

== Later life ==
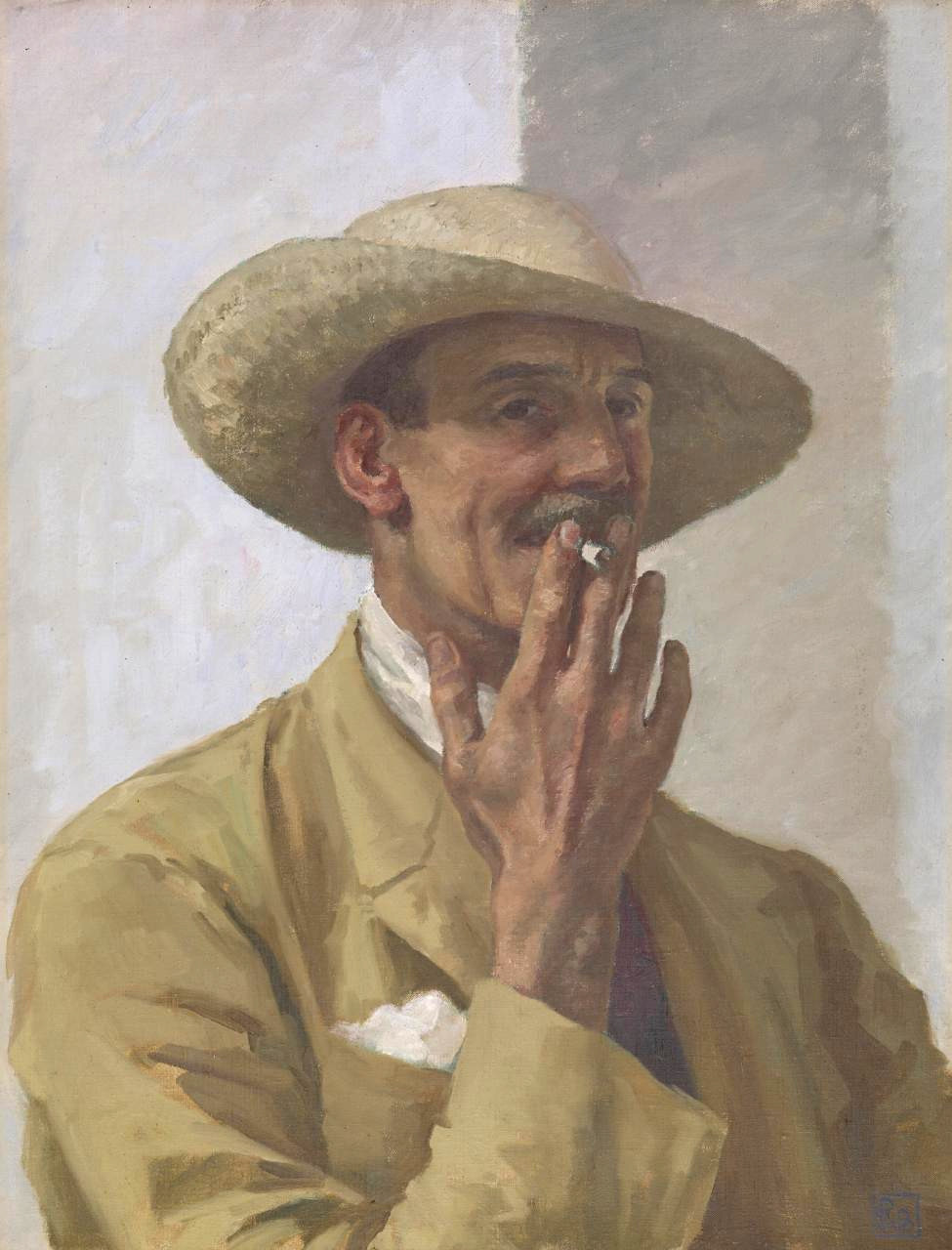
Self Portrait (1920)

In 1895, Bunny met his wife Jeanne Morel, a fellow art student, who he married in 1902, at age 38. Deborah Edwards states that Bunny was a homosexual, however, as she explicates, "the fin de siecle's two most famous homosexual men, Oscar Wilde and Marcel Proust, demonstrated liaisons with and love of women do not exclude homosexuality." The happiness of his relationship with his wife is unknown. "Some say it was terrible, others are highly romantic."

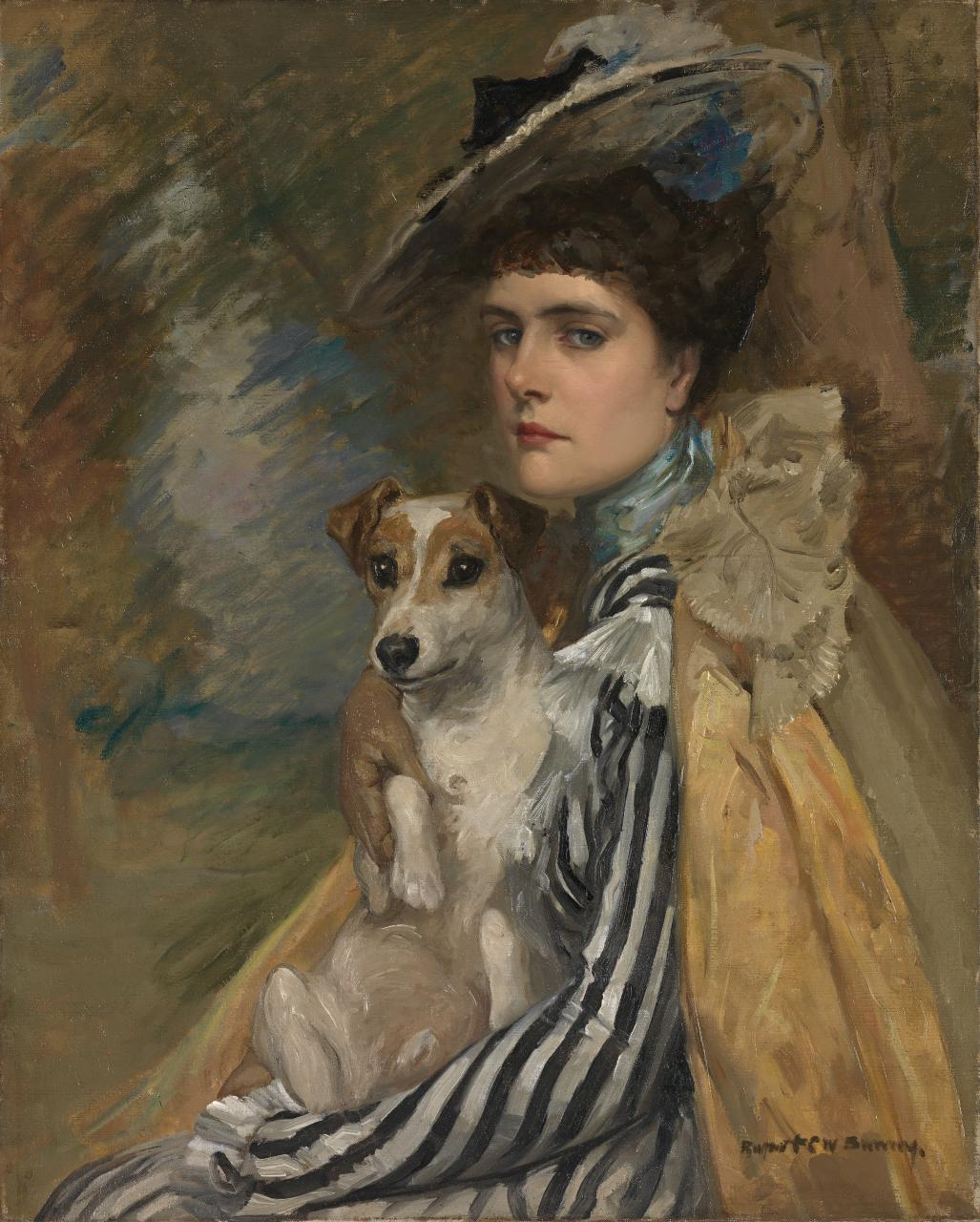
Jeanne (1902)

Bunny led a cosmopolitan lifestyle in Paris, mixing with artists and musicians such as Claude Debussy, Auguste Rodin, Nellie Melba, and Sarah Bernhardt. Sharing his studio with Alastair Cary-Elwes, the grandson of an English baronet, Bunny was continually networking. While still studying under Laurens, Bunny continually attended his teacher's open studios, which allowed him to meet many 'high-society figures'. Additionally, he attended the salons of the well connected artist Jacques-Émile Blanche, Emmi de Némethy and her grandmother the Countess Schärffenberg, the Hungarian poet József Kiss' wife and Madame Ayem, a collector of Gustave Moreau. Thus, Bunny was well connected and supported in Paris. In 1911, Bunny visited Australia with his wife. For many years afterwards, Bunny travelled back and forth between Australia and France. Morel died in 1933. Following almost 50 years living overseas, Bunny moved back to Australia permanently in 1933. He lived on Toorak Road in South Yarra, Victoria. The Depression, his own economic hardship and his wife's death were factors in his relocation to Australia.

Bunny assimilated into the art scene in Melbourne easily, and continued to show his work. This included an annual exhibition in the Macquarie Gallery. He rejected Robert Menzies' invitation to join the Australian Academy of Art in 1939. Instead he became the Vice-President of the Contemporary Art Society established in 1939 in Melbourne.

Bunny died in a private hospital on 25 May 1947, at age 82.

== Accolades and achievements ==
Deborah Edwards, curator of Rupert Bunny: Artist in Paris, said Bunny is "unquestionably the most successful artist we (Australia) had in Paris". He regularly exhibited works in Parisian salons. Incomparable to other expatriates, he had a deep intimacy and familiarity with the Parisian art scene. As Australian art critic John McDonald stated, "It is no exaggeration to say that Bunny had the greatest international reputation of any Australian-born painter". He began exhibiting works in the Salon de la Société des Artistes Français in 1888. Bunny also exhibited in the New Salon, the Old Salon and the Salon D'Automne. He was the first Australian to receive an honourable mention in 1890 at the Salon de la Société des Artistes Français for the painting Tritons (circa 1890). He also exhibited works internationally, including in Australia, America and England. Sea Idlyll, exhibited in the Royal Academy, was bought by Alfred Felton, who gave it to the National Gallery of Victoria in 1892. This was to be the first painting of Bunny's that an Australian gallery obtained.

In 1894 Bunny became a member of the Royal Society of British Artists. Engaging in many 'transnational' relationships with other expatriates and cosmopolitans, Bunny extensively networked, particularly with Americans, who formed the majority of expatriates in Paris. Thus, in 1900, he became a member of the American Art Association of Paris. He also frequented the American Club. Also in 1900, his work Burial of St Catherine of Alexandria was awarded a bronze medal in the Exposition Universelle, Paris. In 1901, Bunny exhibited two paintings in the Victorian Gold Jubilee Exhibition 1851–1901 in Bendigo, in which he was awarded the gold medal for Best Painting. In 1904 the French government bought his work titled Aprés le Bain from the New Salon exhibition for the Musee de Luxembourg, Paris. He was the first Australian artist to have works acquired by the French government. Throughout his career, the government acquired 13 of his works, the most acquired from a foreign artist living in Paris by the government. This included Endormies (circa 1904), now exhibited in the National Gallery of Victoria, Summertime (circa 1907) and A Summer Morning (circa 1908), both now exhibited in the Art Gallery of New South Wales.

In 1905 he became a membre associe of the Société Nationale des Beaux-Arts. In 1906, the French government purchased its second painting, Endormies. In 1910, he was on the jury of the Salon d'Automne, which accepted Matisse's Danse and Musique. Major art critic Gustave Geffroy was a 'prestigious critical admirer' of Bunny's work. In 1939 he became Artist Vice-President of the Contemporary Art Society in Melbourne. The National Gallery of Victoria held a retrospective exhibition of Bunny's works, curated by Mary Eagle, which was the first exhibition to honour a living artist in this way. Since his death, there have been several major retrospectives of Bunny's work including Rupert Bunny: Artist in Paris, curated by Deborah Edwards, which travelled from the Art Gallery of New South Wales to many galleries including the National Gallery of Victoria and the Art Gallery of South Australia in 2010. It showed over 100 of Bunny's works, including monotypes, paintings and drawings. Some of which had never been exhibited in Australia before. Rupert Bunny: Last Fine Days, A focus exhibition was curated to complement Edwards’ Rupert Bunny: Artist in Paris in the regional Newcastle Art Gallery.

== Exhibitions ==
Date(s)	Gallery/Exhibition	Location
1883	School of Painting Student's exhibition	Melbourne, Australia
1887	Royal Institute of Painters in Watercolour	London, England
1888–90; 1892–1900	Salon de la Société des Artistes Francais	Paris, France
1890–98; 1902–04; 1906–07; 1910	Royal Academy	London, England
1893	Royal Society of British Artists	London, England
1893	New Gallery	London, England
1893	Manchester Academy Autumn Exhibition	Manchester, England
1897; 1899; 1904–09; 1914; 1920; 1924–25	Annual Exhibitions of the Carnegie Institute	Pittsburg, USA
1898	Fine Art Society's Galleries	London, England
1901–14; 1919–26; 1929–32	Salon de la Société Nationale des Beaux-Arts	Paris, France
1901	Victorian Gold Jubilee Exhibition 1851–1901.	Melbourne, Australia
1903	Galerie Silberberg	Paris, France
1903; 1905; 1909; 1913; 1919–25; 1927 and 1931	Salon d'Automne	Paris, France
1904; 1911; 1937; 1939; 1940 and 1942–44	Victorian Artists Society	Melbourne, Australia
1905	Galerie Henry Graves	Paris, France
1906	Cercle des Arts, Union Artistique Internationale	Paris, France
1911	Baillie Gallery	London, England
1911; 1927–28; 1932; 1934–41	Athenaeum Gallery	Melbourne, Australia
1911	Messrs. Lawson and Little	Sydney, Australia
1917; 1921; 1922; 1929	Galeries Georges Petit	Paris, France
1922	Fine Arts Society's Gallery	Melbourne, Australia
1923; 1925; 1928	Anthony Hordern Galleries	Sydney, Australia
1926	New Gallery	Melbourne, Australia
1930	Twenty One Gallery	London, England
1933	Everyman's Library	Melbourne, Australia
1934–37	Contemporary Art Group	Melbourne, Australia
1936–38	Hogan's Art Gallery	Melbourne, Australia
1938	150 Years of Australian Art	Sydney, Australia
1939	Contemporary Art Society exhibition	Melbourne, Australia
1940–46	Macquarie Galleries	Sydney, Australia
1946	National Gallery of Victoria	Melbourne, Australia

== Gallery ==
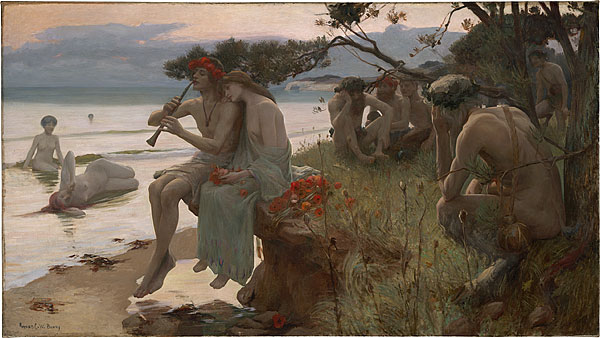
Pastorale (1893)

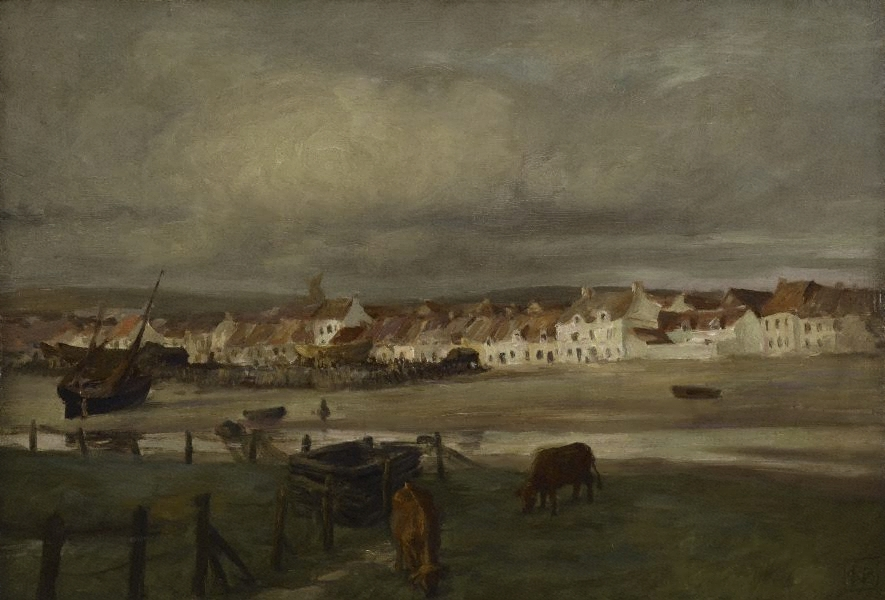
Étaples (1902)

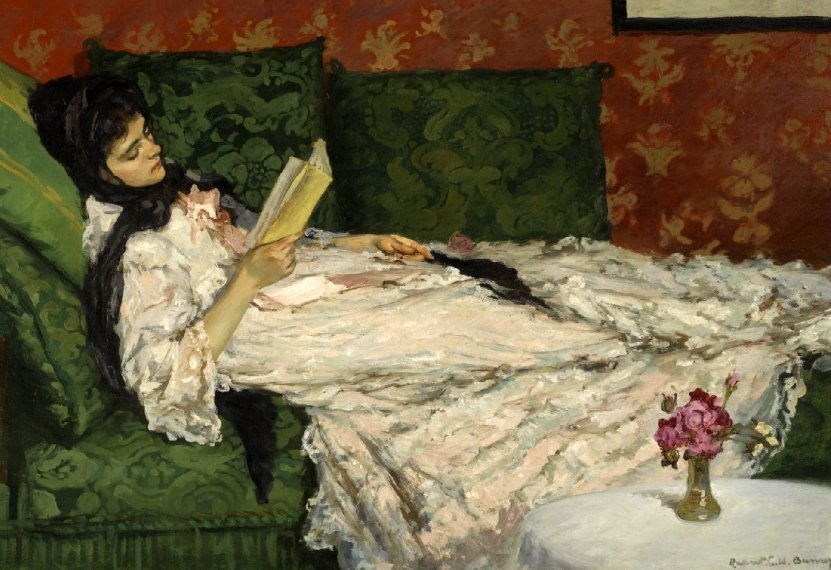
Jeanne Reading (circa 1902)

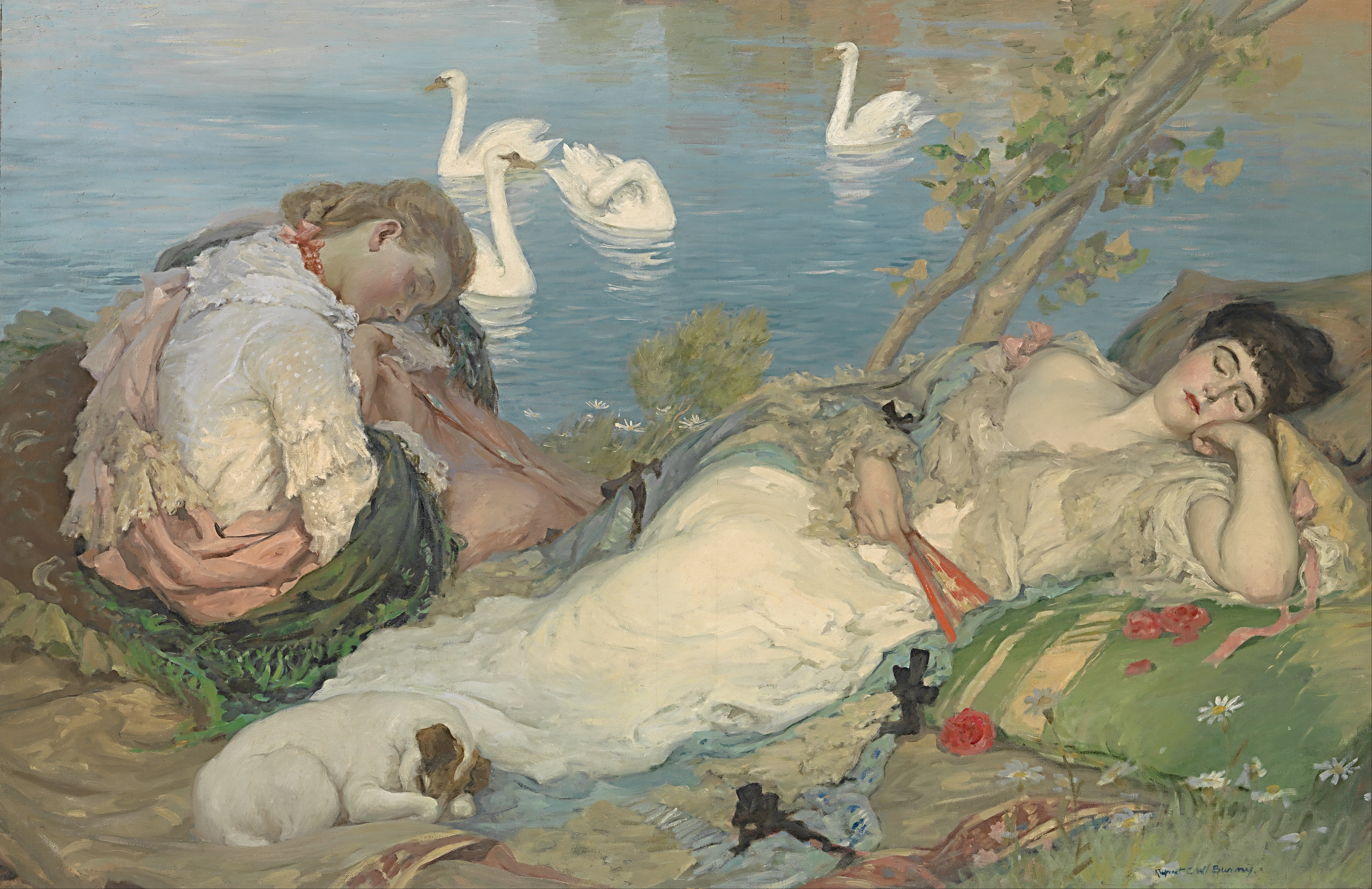
Endormies (circa 1904)

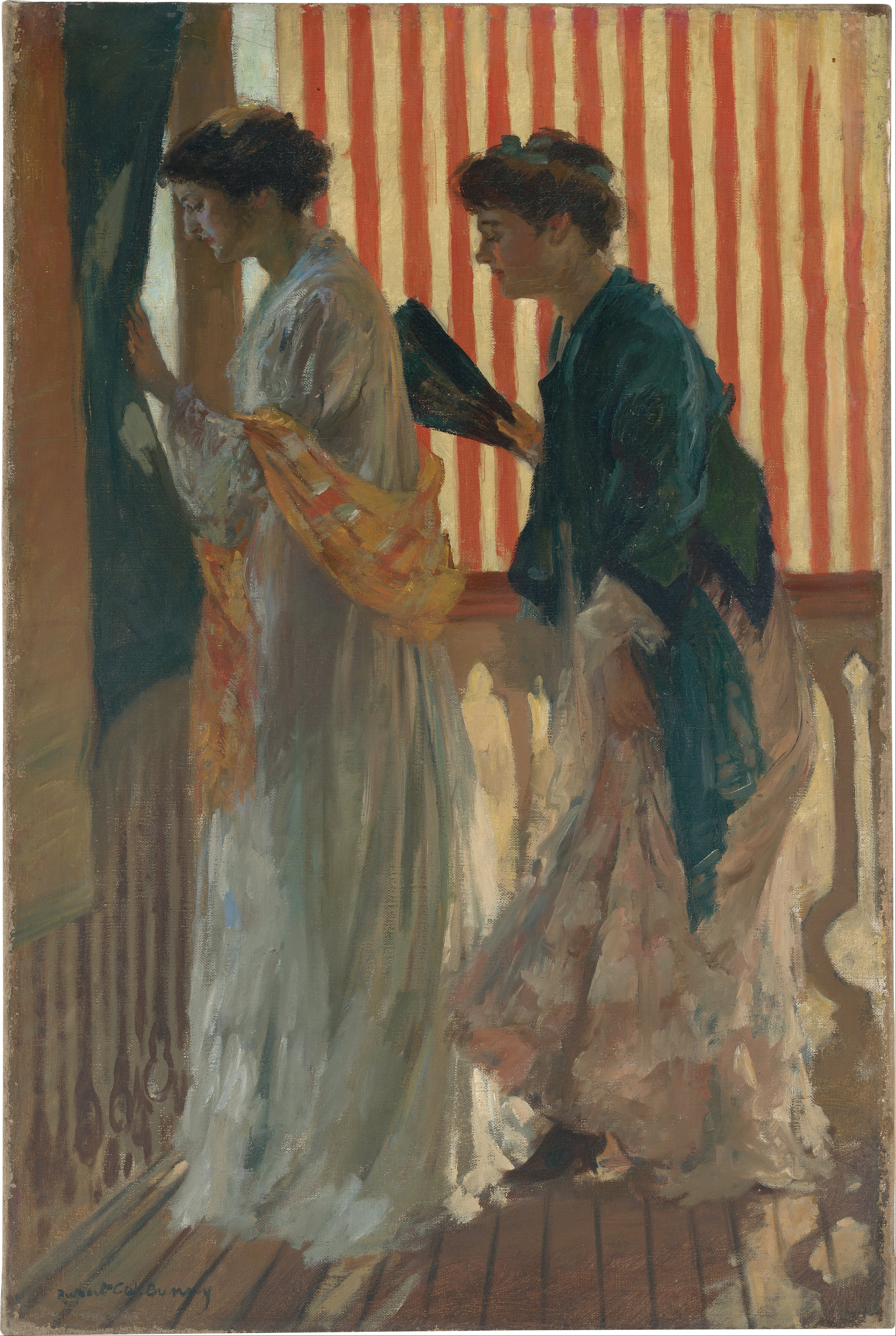
Who comes? (circa 1908)

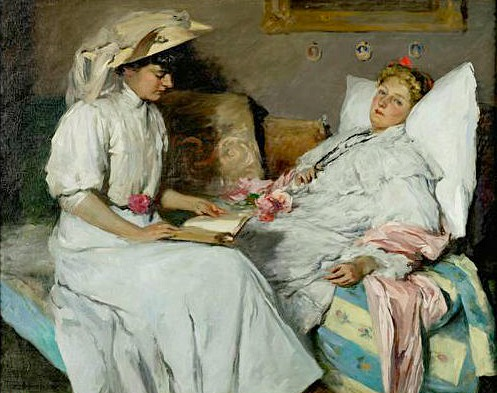
La Convalescente (The Convalescent) 1910

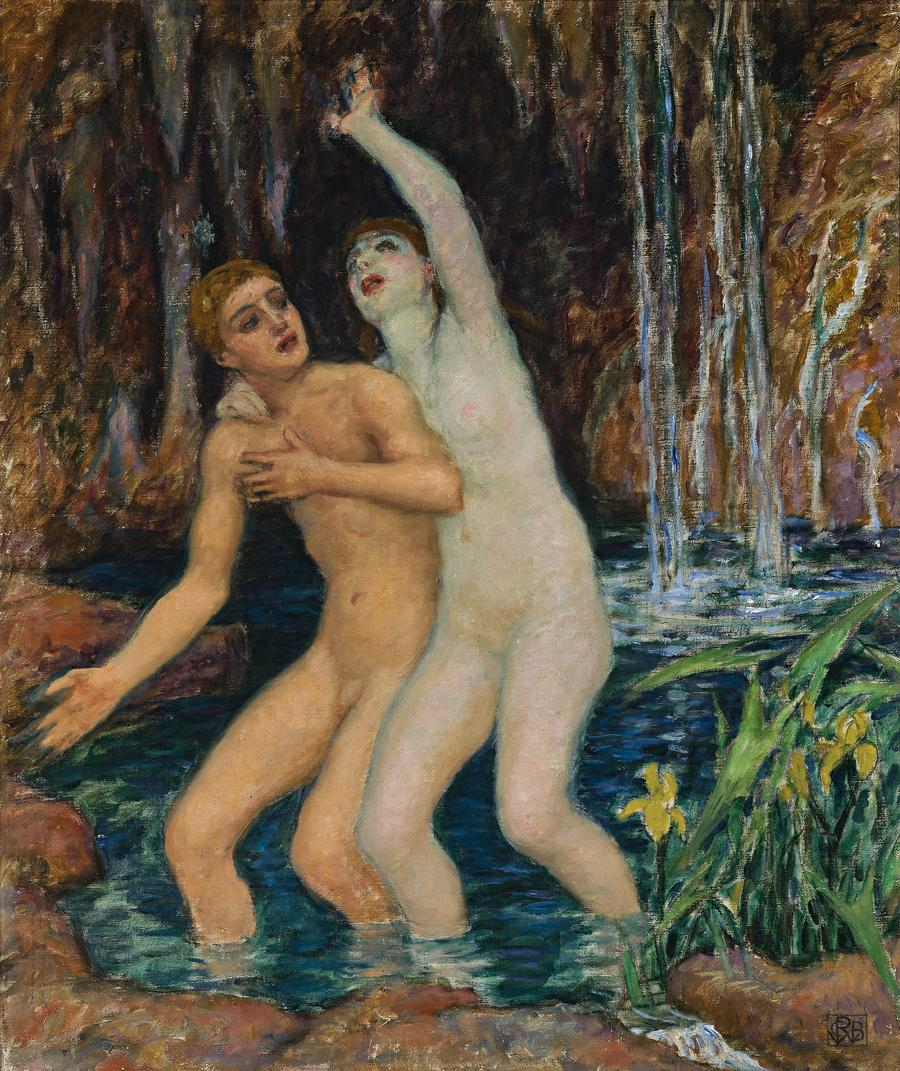
The Nymph of Salmacis (1919)

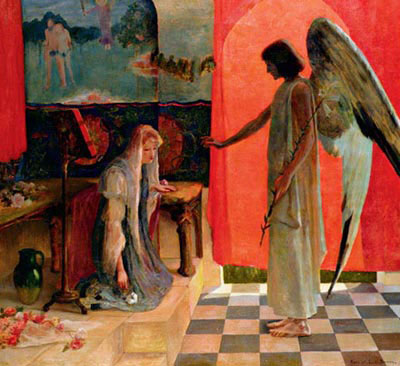
Annunciation (circa 1920s)
