= The Gallic Women: Episode from the Roman Invasion =

Painting by Auguste-Barthélemy Glaize

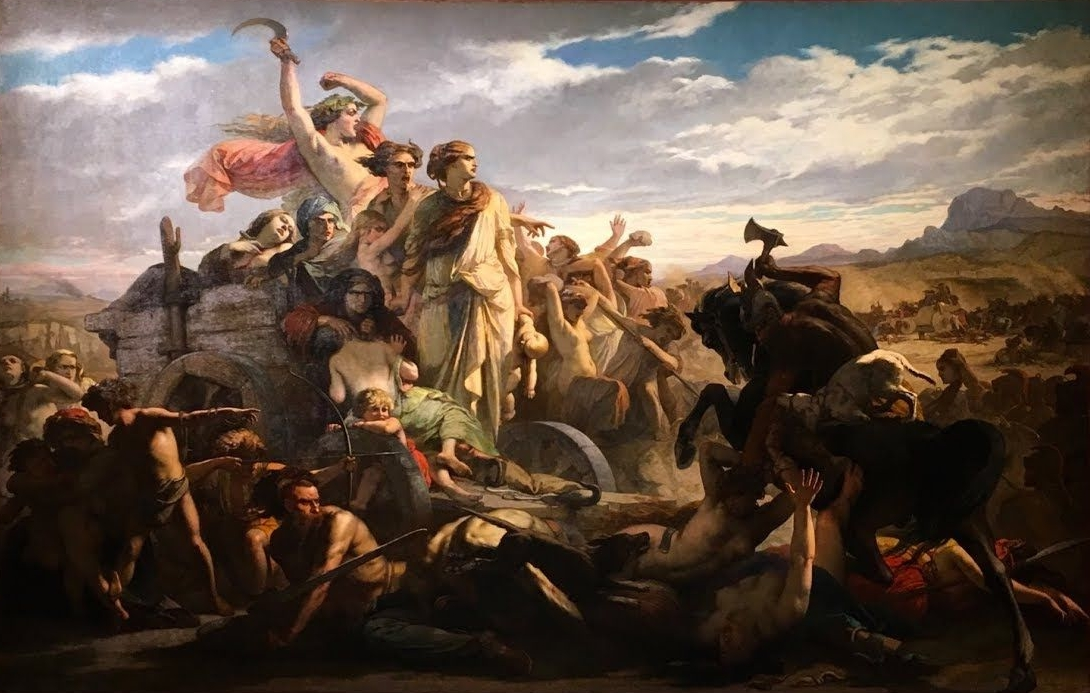
The Gallic Women: Episode from the Roman Invasion (1851) by Auguste-Barthélemy Glaize

The Gallic Women: Episode from the Roman Invasion (French: Les Femmes Gauloises: épisode de l'invasion romaine) is a painting by Auguste-Barthélemy Glaize, from 1851. It is a very large oil on canvas work, with a height of 424 cm and a width of 651 cm. It was exhibited at the Salon of 1852 and purchased by the French state in 1853.

== Description ==
The painting illustrates the siege of Gergovie, at which Julius Caesar established Roman rule over Gaul. According to Caesar's own account, Gallic women harangued and insulted the Romans. In the foreground on the right, a Roman horseman attacked by dogs, strikes women who have fallen to the ground. Dead or wounded Gallic soldiers lie on the left, and a woman is suffocating her children. Behind her, a group of Gallic women on a chariot stands at the centre of the composition. An old mother hides her daughter in her arms; another shakes her golden sickle while shouting; a third, implacable in her anger and in her hatred, holds the child she has just slaughtered to save him from the victors. Behind them, women gesticulate on a cart drawn by an ox. On the right, the Romans continue their bloodthirsty and pitiless advance. In the background, fighting continues in the Auvergne mountains.

The painting is a work of rehabilitation. Classical authors mostly considered that the outstanding trait of Gallic women as that they showed great fighting spirit; they were thought of as wild and dishevelled, hence typically barbaric. In contrast, Julius Caesar, in his Commentarii de Bello Gallico emphasised the submissiveness of the woman of Gergovie, who had begged the Romans to spare them. Glaize’s work portrayed them as neither barbaric nor suppliant but bold and defiant. The theatrical postures and athletic bodies depicted recall the famous The Intervention of the Sabine Women by Jacques-Louis David.

== History ==
The painting was a new departure for Glaize who usually exhibited pieces dealing with mythological themes executed in a conventional and poetic manner. It was acquired by the state because of its patriotic qualities - Glaize had transformed a historic defeat into an act of bravery that appealed greatly to the newly-proclaimed emperor Napoleon III. It was sent to the Musée Rolin in Autun, near the site of this historic battle of Alesia, where it remained until 1982. It was then assigned to the Louvre and put on display at the Musée d'Orsay. The Musée Rolin retains Glaize’s smaller scale study for the work (69.3 cm x 97.7 cm).

== Critical reception ==
Commenting on the works exhibited at the 1852 Salon, Marie-Noemi Cadiot remarked on the energy, character and grand scale of the painting, but felt the composition was let down by Glaize’s lack of skill as a colourist. L'Artiste agreed, though it did praise the quality of light that was projected onto the figures, comparing it to the work of Le Sueur and Poussin. Some however felt that rough cries and belligerent expressions of the women were excessively brutal. fr:Alphonse Grün commented that Glaize had almost risen to the level of his subject; like others, he felt that the powerful subject and dramatic composition were let down by the poverty of colour, the facial expressions of the women, and some elements of the drawing.

== Restoration ==
In 2016 the painting underwent extensive conservation and restoration work while remaining on public view. A glass barrier was erected around it so that the public could watch the conservators working on it.
