= Auguste-Barthélemy Glaize =

French painter

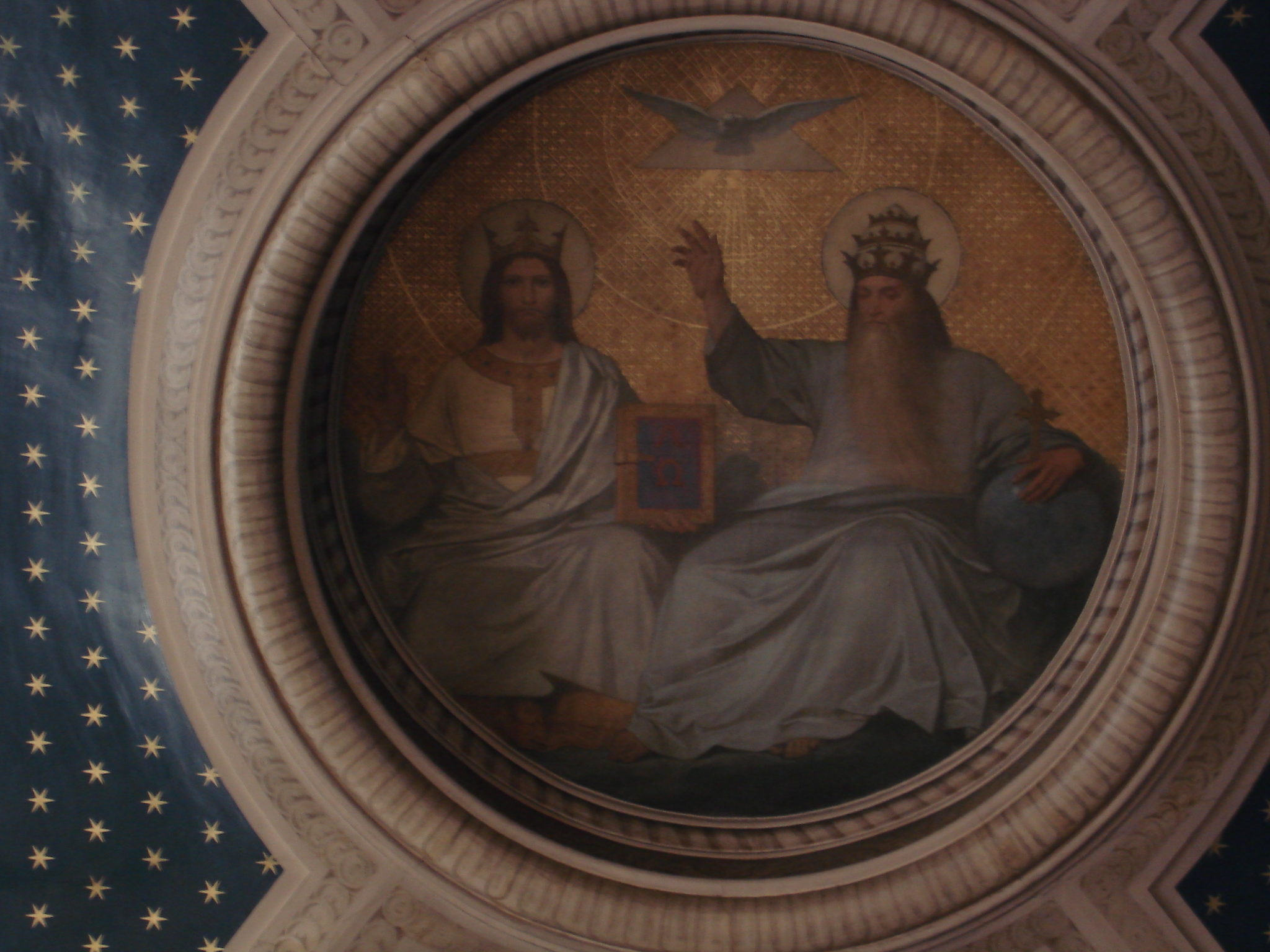
Auguste Glaize, The Trinity, 1868, Painting on the ceiling of the choir in the Église Saint-Jacques-du-Haut-Pas, Paris

Auguste-Barthélemy Glaize (1807–1893) was a French Romantic painter of history paintings and genre paintings.

== Career ==
He studied under the painters Achille Devéria and Eugène Devéria and taught Paul-Maurice Duthoit and his son Pierre-Paul-Léon Glaize.

Born in Montpellier, Auguste Glaize was one of the great French Romantic painters of the early 19th century, marking his career with important history paintings and cycles of monumental religious paintings in several churches in Paris and the provinces. He was most well known for painting beautiful mythological or historical scenes, often containing nude females and the humanity he portrayed in his subjects faces. The painting conserved in the church at Quesnoy-sur-Airaines is considered one of his masterworks.

The sometimes anti-establishment themes in his paintings, earned criticism from religious leaders at the time. For example, while praising the beauty and originality of his painting Alfred Des Essarts criticised what he saw as a 'profane' way to treat religious subjects. This was typical of religious criticism of romantic art at the time.

== Some works ==
- Amiens, musée de Picardie : Les Écueils, Salon de 1864.
- Autun, musée Rolin : Les Femmes gauloises, épisode de l'invasion romaine, esquisse pour le tableau conservé à Paris au musée d'Orsay.
- Avignon, musée Calvet : Luca Signorelli se disposant à peindre son fils tué en duel à Cortone.
- Béziers, musée des beaux-arts : Les Amours à l'encan.
- Brest, musée des beaux-arts : L'immaculée conception entre saint François de Sales et sainte Jeanne de Chantal, 1853, huile sur toile, 252,5 x 202 cm.
- Lodève, cathédrale Saint-Fulcran : L'humilité de Sainte Élisabeth de Hongrie, 1843.
- Marseille, musée des beaux-arts : Le Pilori.
- Montpellier:
  - musée Fabre :
    - Le Sang de Vénus, 1845;
    - Portrait d'Alfred Bruyas, dit Le Burnous, 1849;
    - Portrait de Bruyas;
    - Intérieur du cabinet de Bruyas, 1848;
    - Souvenir des Pyrénées, 1851.
  - Chapelle de la Miséricorde :
    - Les Dames de la Miséricorde
- Nogent-sur-Seine, église paroissiale Saint-Laurent : Conversion de Marie-Madeleine, 1844.
- Paris :
  - église Saint-Eustache, chapelle de la Rédemption :
    - La Naissance du Christ;
    - La Mort de Jésus-Christ;
    - Adam et Ève chassés du paradis;
    - La Captivité de Babylone.
  - église Saint-Jacques-du-Haut-Pas : La Trinité (1868), plafond.
  - musée du Louvre : Héliodore chassé du temple.
  - musée d'Orsay : Les Femmes gauloises, épisode de l'invasion romaine.
- Pantin, église paroissiale Saint-Germain-l'Auxerrois : Sainte Elisabeth de Hongrie
- Rouen, musée des beaux-arts : La Pourvoyeuse de misère.
- Vicdessos, église paroissiale Notre-Dame-de-l'Assomption : L'Adoration des Bergers, en collaboration avec Louis Mercadier.

== Gallery ==
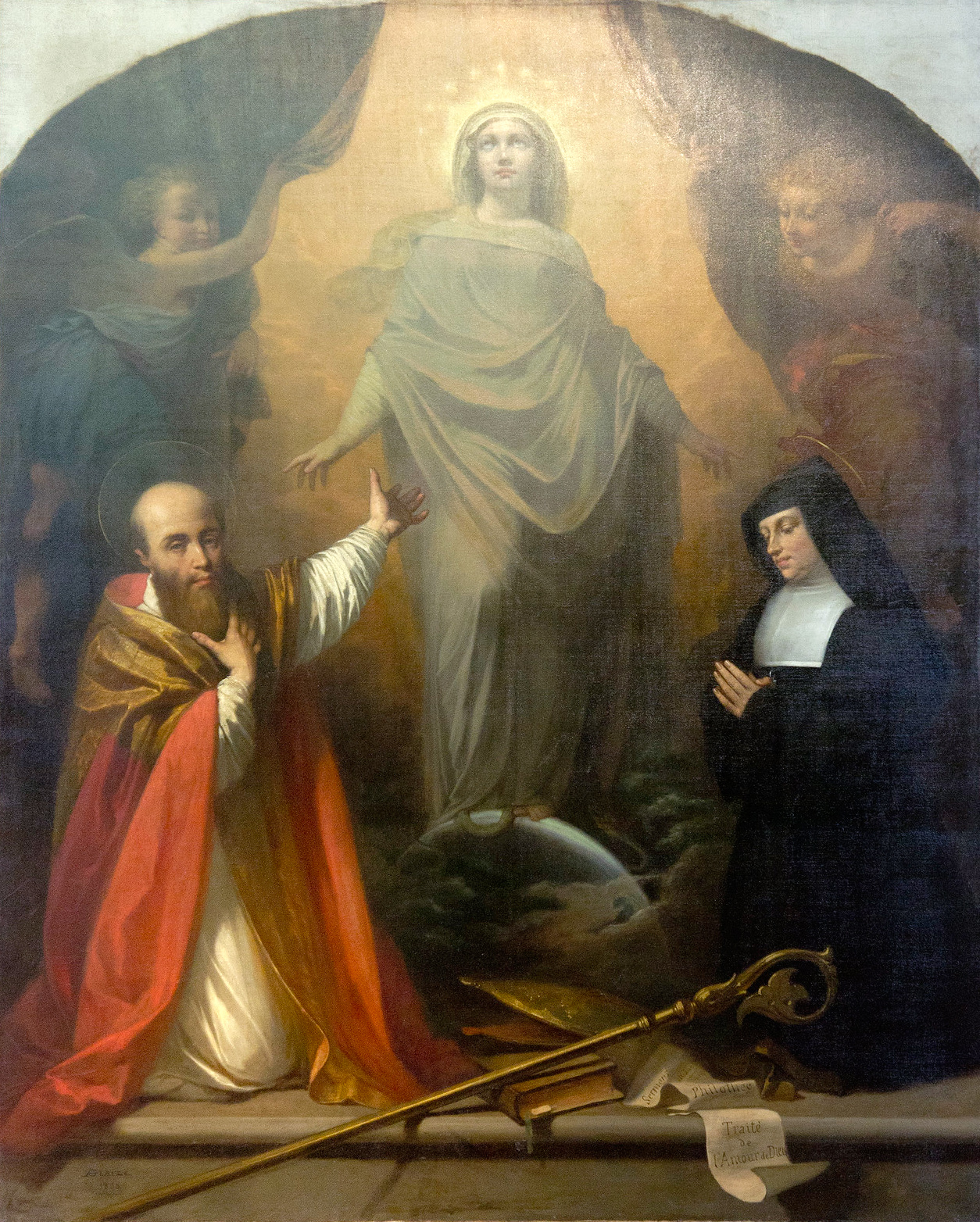
L'Immaculée Conception, 1853

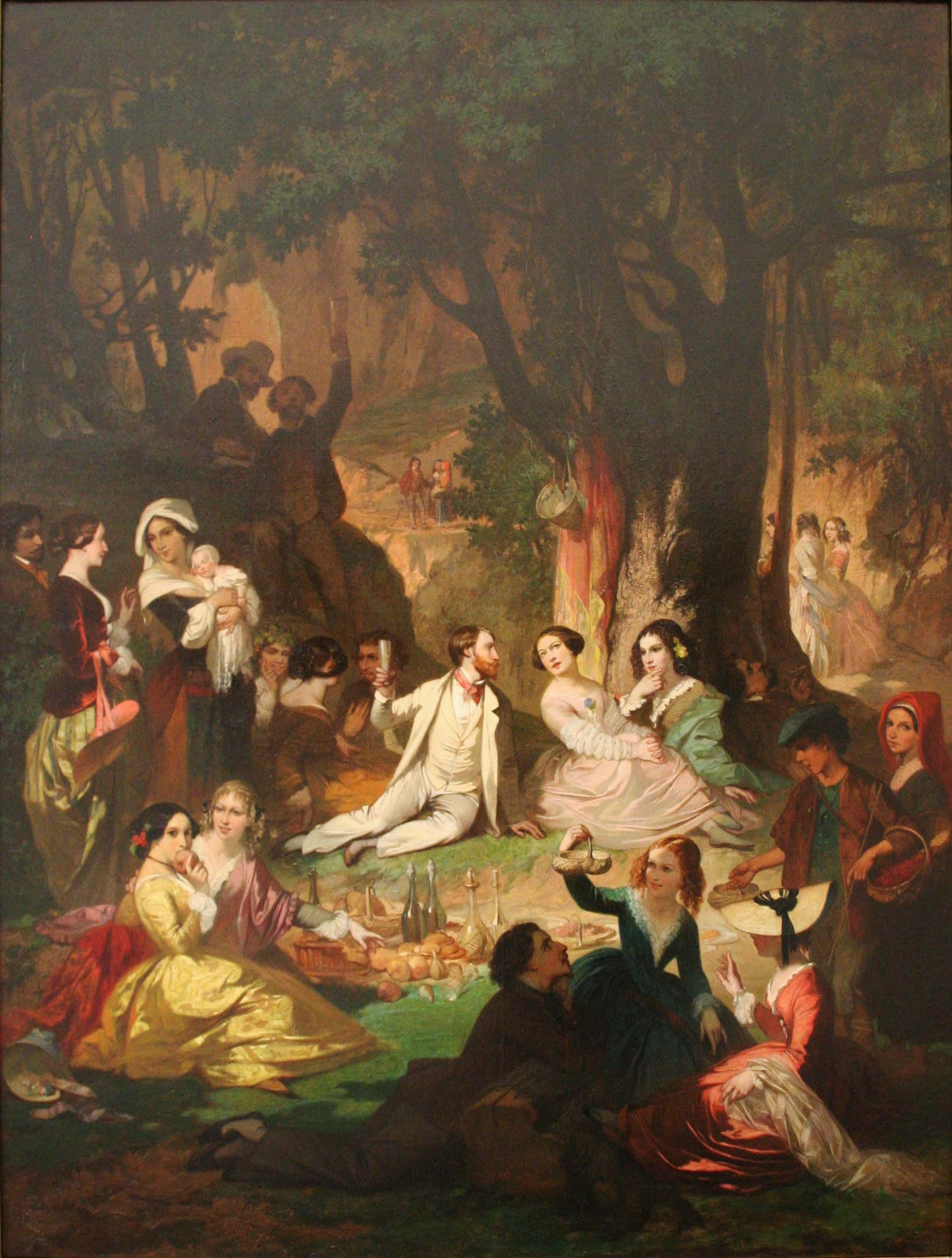
Souvenir of the Pyrenees, 1851

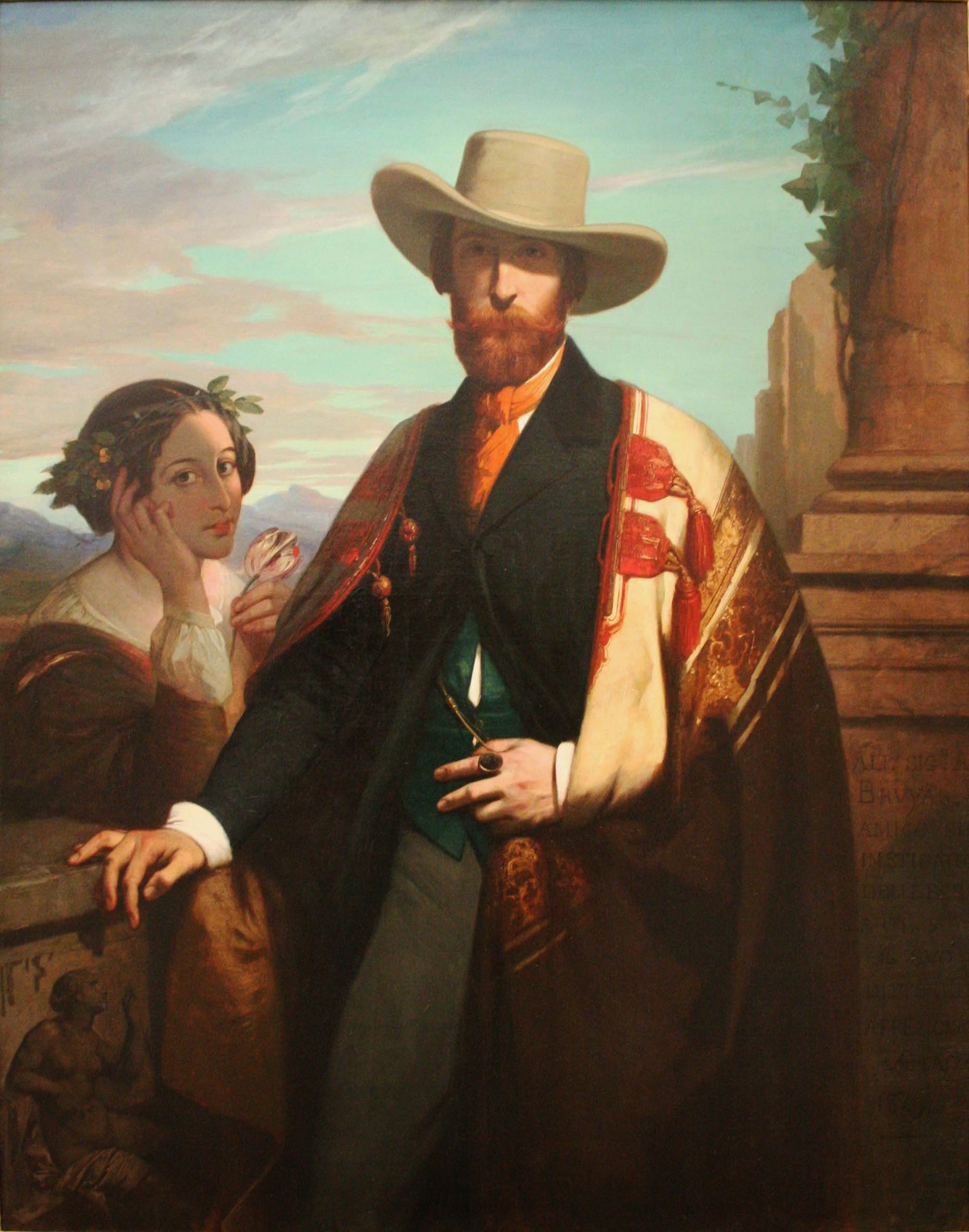
Portrait d'Alfred Bruyas, 1849
