= Léon Glaize =

French painter (1842–1931)

Pierre Paul-Léon Glaize

Léon Glaize (Paris, February 3, 1842 - Paris, July 7, 1931) was a French painter.

Although he lived in the second half of the 1800s and the first thirty years of the 1900s, he never abandoned the neoclassical and romantic concept and technique that he had learned from his father and his teacher Jean-Léon Gérôme. Every new tendency, idea and technique of art that in those fertile years alternated and overlapped were foreign to him. He painted portraits, religious scenes, celebratory scenes and especially genre scenes.

== Biography ==
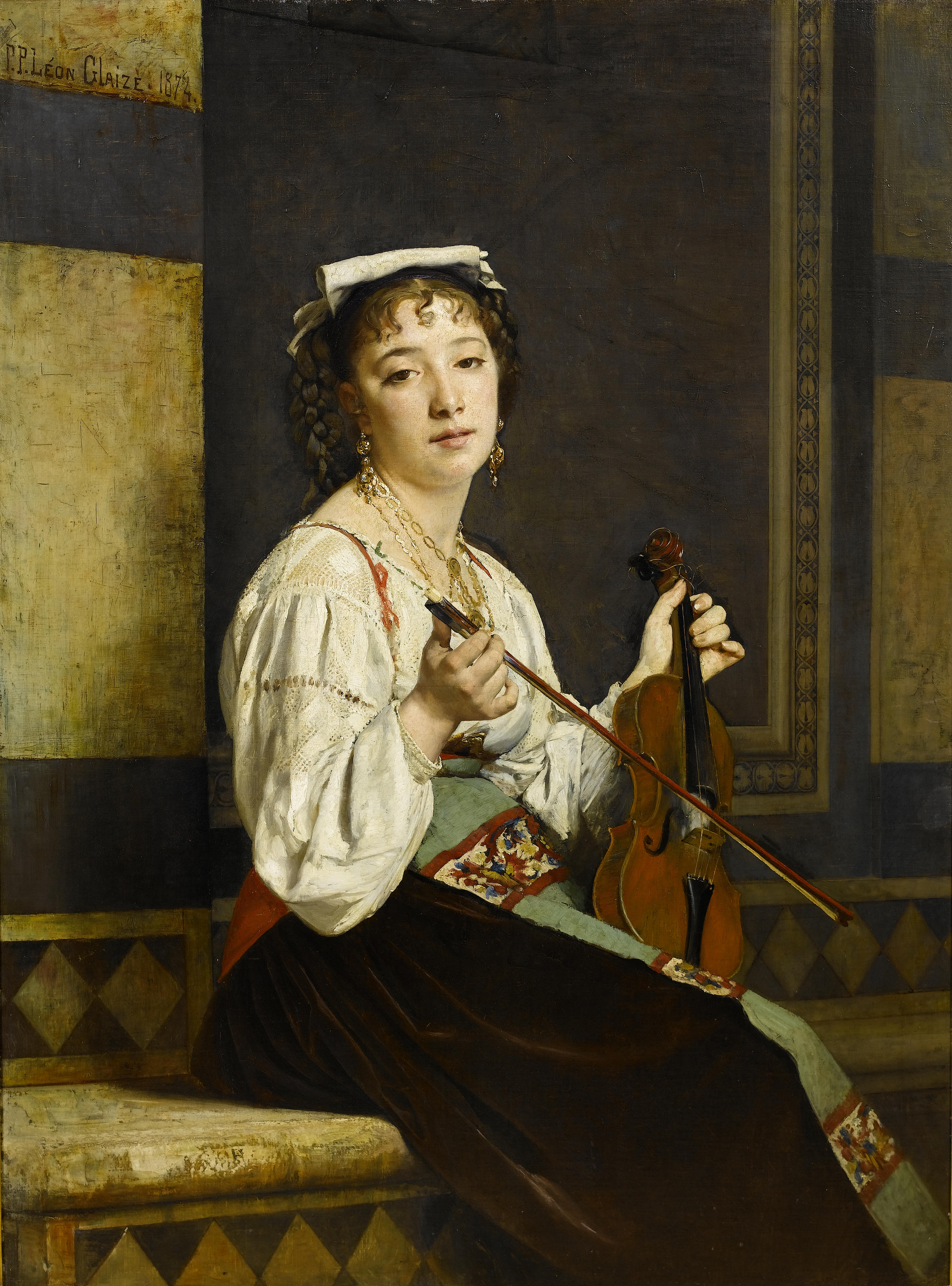
Pierre Paul-Léon Glaize - La musicienne Italienne (1874)

Pierre-Paul-Léon Glaize (more briefly called "Léon") was born into a family of artists. His father, the painter Auguste-Barthélemy Glaize initiated him into art and was his first teacher. At the age of 21 (1863) he enrolled at the École des beaux-arts in Paris and was assigned to the atelier of Jean-Léon Gérôme. He worked profitably and three years later attempted the Prix de Rome in painting, but only got the second prize. He thus began his professional career in the shadow of his father and in 1869 he debuted at the Salon. He exhibited there for several years, obtaining numerous awards and medals, but never shone, although he worked hard and received several commissions.

Léon Glaize participated in the decoration of the hall of arts of the City Hall of Paris and the wedding hall of the twentieth "arrondissement".

In 1890, the issuing institute of the Bank of France contacted him and commissioned him to study and then create the designs of the banknotes destined for the colonies. His paintings were accepted, along with those of others, and passed to the Bank of Madagascar, transformed into engravings by Charles-Jules Robert.

He was called to serve on the jury of the Salon of the "Society of French Artists" and in 1906 was promoted to Officer of the Legion d'honneur.

Léon Glaize died at the age of 89, presumably in Paris, and was buried in the Père-Lachaise cemetery.

== Works ==
List of works included in public collections.

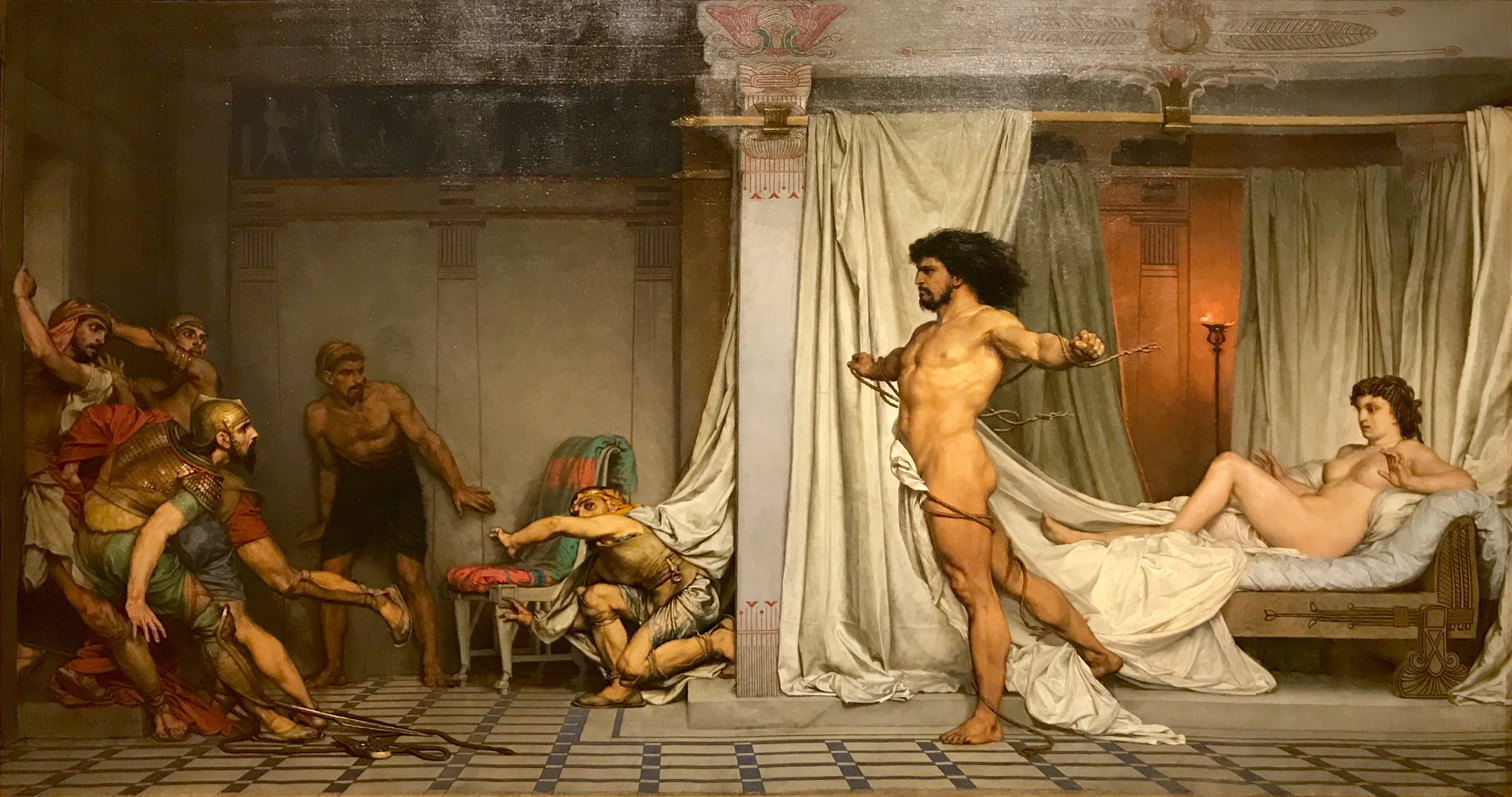
Samson déchirant ses liens, Mulhouse

- New York :
  - Metropolitan Museum of Art, "Face au miroir" (1873), oil on canvas, 101 x 76 cm.
- Mulhouse :
  - Musée des Beaux-Arts: Samson déchirant ses liens, 1864.
- Paris :
  - Church of Saint-Merri : decoration of a chapel of the south side of the ambulatory.
  - City Hall of the XX "arrondissement" of Paris: City hall of the XX arrondissement of Paris
    - Les Grands Hommes de la Révolution devant la Postérité, 1889.
    - La Famille et le Travail
    - Le Mariage, fresco in the wedding hall.
    - Le Triomphe de la République, 1891.
- Rouen :
  - Rouen Opera House: L'Apothéose de Corneille, 1882, work destroyed during world war II.

== Salon ==
- Une conjuration aux premiers temps de Rome, Salon of 1875, (work destroyed during world war II)
- Le Christ aux limbes, Salon in1900.
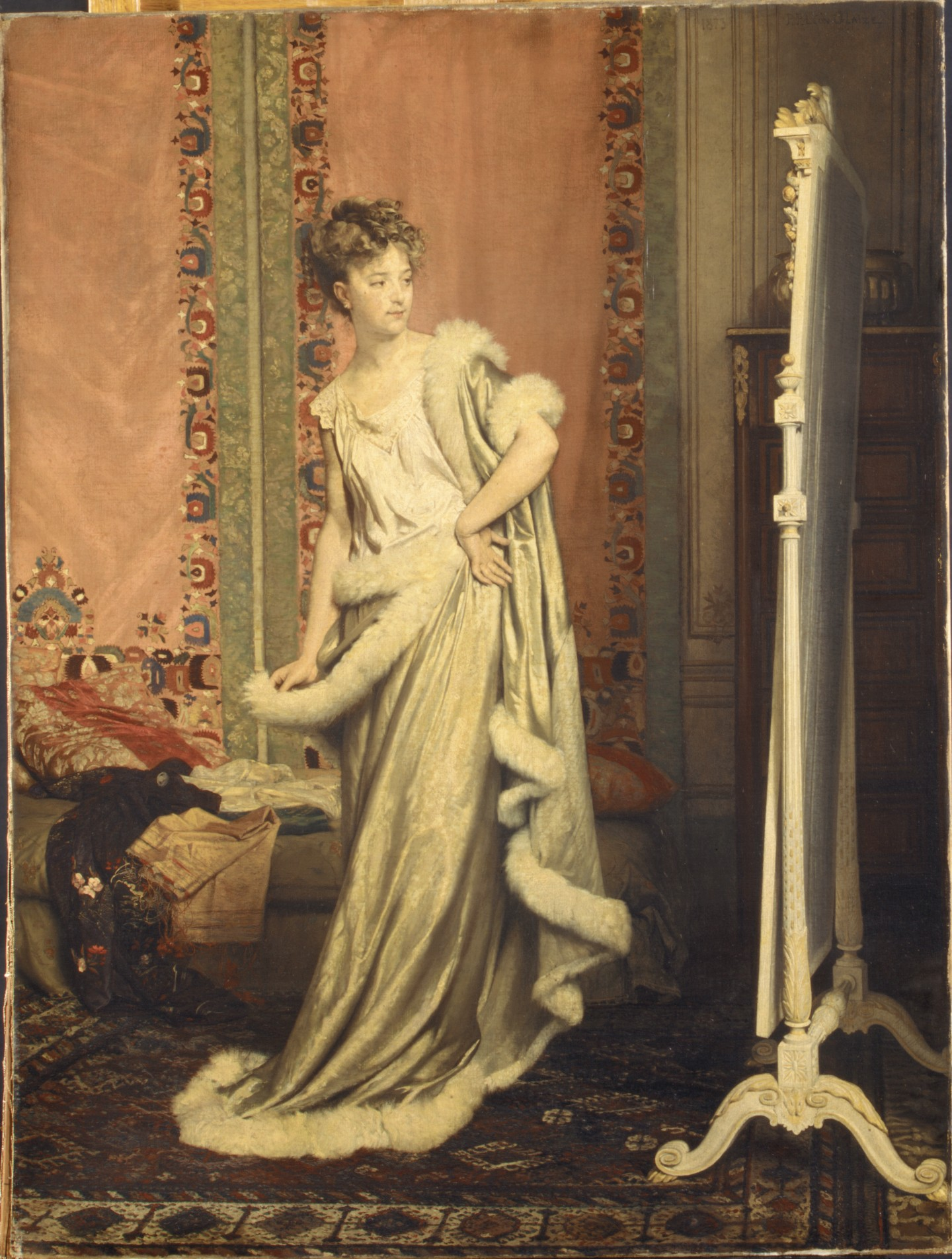
Davanti allo specchio

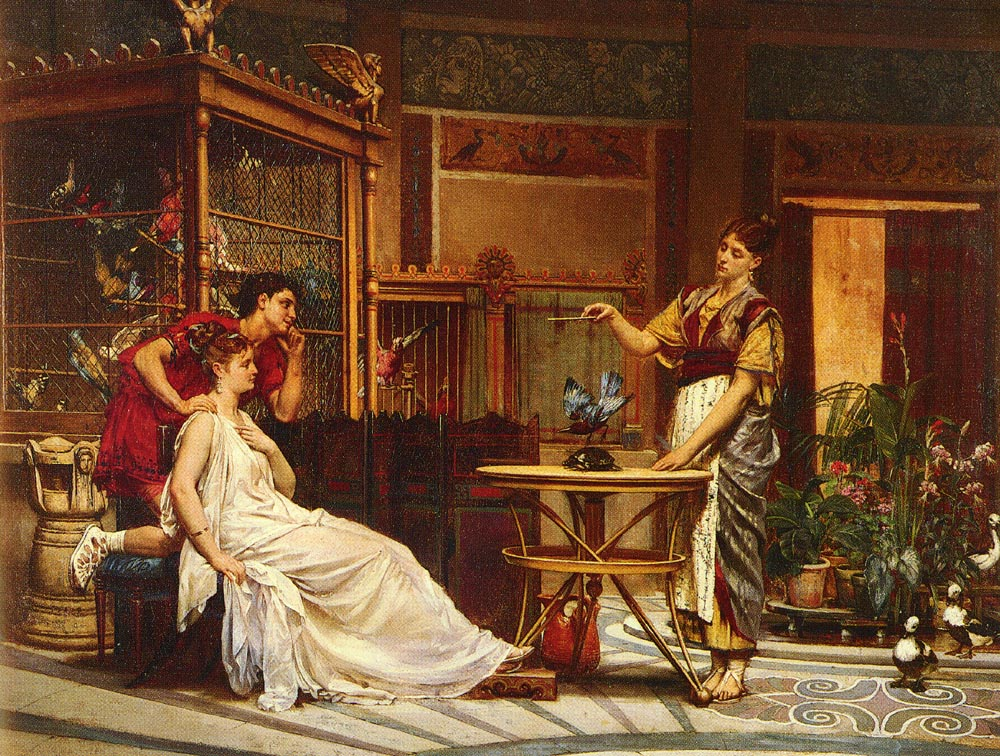
L'incantatrice di uccelli

== Bibliography ==
- Dictionnaire Bénézit, ediz. Gründ 1999. Volume 6 - ISBN 2700030168

== Other projects ==
- Wikimedia Commons contiene immagini o altri file su Léon Glaize
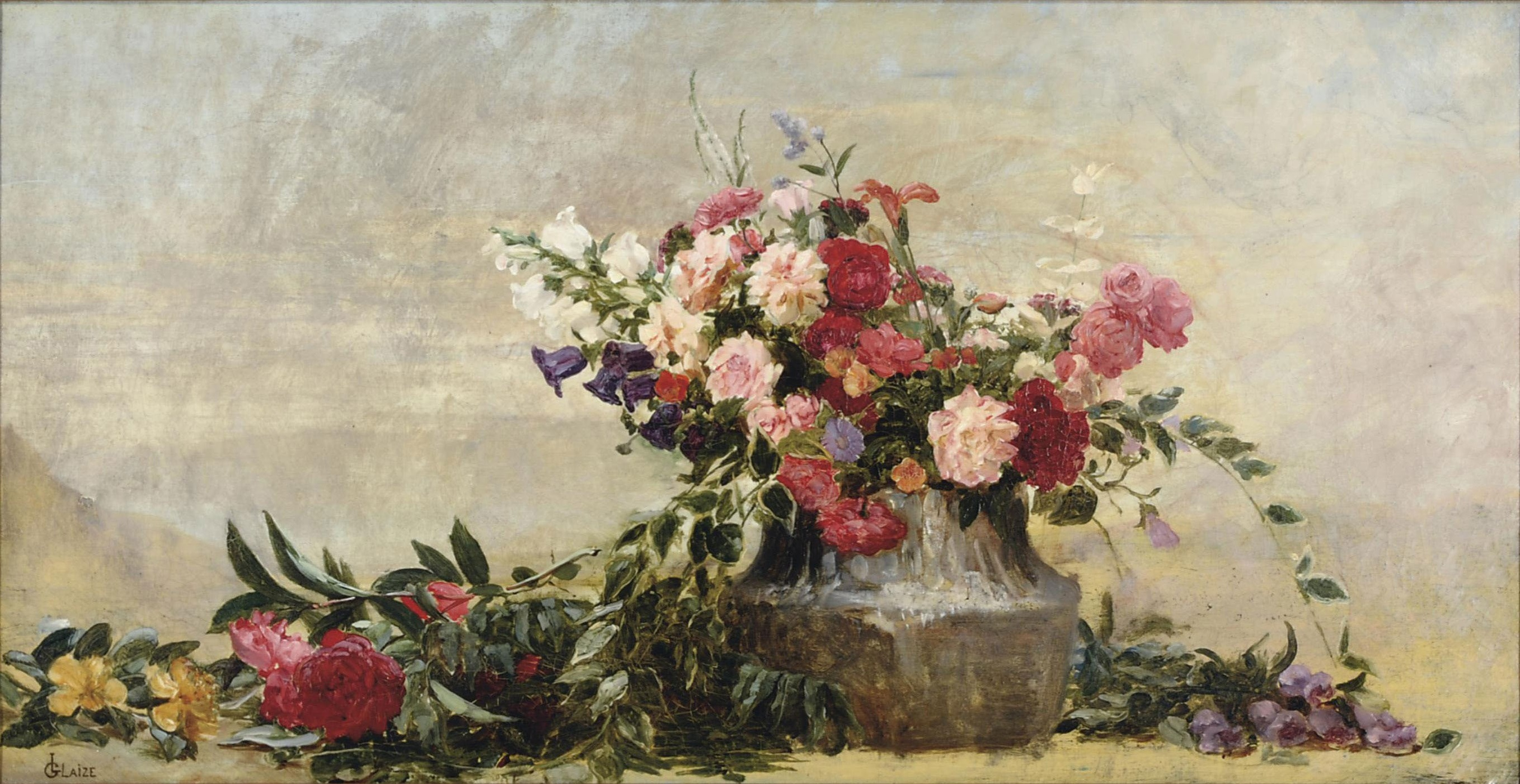
Fiori
