= List of rural localities in Karachay-Cherkessia =

Map of Russia with Karachay-Cherkessia highlighted

This is a list of rural localities in Karachay-Cherkessia. Karachay-Cherkessia (Russian: Карача́ево-Черке́сская Респу́блика, Karachayevo-Cherkesskaya Respublika; Karachay-Balkar: Къарачай-Черкес Республика, Qaraçay-Çerkes Respublika; Kabardian: Къэрэшей-Шэрджэс Республикэ, Ķêrêšei-Šêrdžês Respublikê, Nogai: Қарашай-Шеркес Республикасы, Qaraşay-Şerkes Respublikası) or Karachay-Cherkessia (Russian: Карача́ево-Черке́сия, Karachayevo-Cherkesiya) is a federal subject (a republic) of Russia. It is geographically located in the North Caucasus region of Southern Russia and is administratively part of the North Caucasian Federal District. Karachay-Cherkessia has a population of 477,859 (2010 Census). 477,859 (2010 Census);

== Abazinsky District ==
Rural localities in Abazinsky District:

- Inzhich-Chukun
- Psyzh

== Adyge-Khablsky District ==
Rural localities in Adyge-Khablsky District:

- Abaza Khabl
- Adyge-Khabl

== Khabezsky District ==
Rural localities in Khabezsky District:

- Abazakt
- Khabez

== Malokarachayevsky District ==
Rural localities in Malokarachayevsky District:

- Uchkeken

== Nogaysky District, Karachay-Cherkess Republic ==
Rural localities in Nogaysky District, Karachay-Cherkess Republic:

- Erken-Shakhar

== Prikubansky District, Karachay-Cherkess Republic ==
Rural localities in Prikubansky District, Karachay-Cherkess Republic:

- Kavkazsky

== Urupsky District ==
Rural localities in Urupsky District:

- Pregradnaya

== Zelenchuksky District ==
Rural localities in Zelenchuksky District:

- Arkhyz
- Zelenchukskaya

== See also ==
- Lists of rural localities in Russia
