= Administrative divisions of Karachay-Cherkessia =

Administrative districts of Russian federal subject

Karachay-Cherkess Republic Russia
- Capital: Cherkessk

Administrative structure (as of 2014)
- Districts: 10
- Cities/towns: 4
- Urban-type settlements: 7
- Selsovets: 0

Municipal structure (as of 2002)
- Rural settlements: 139 (inhabited)

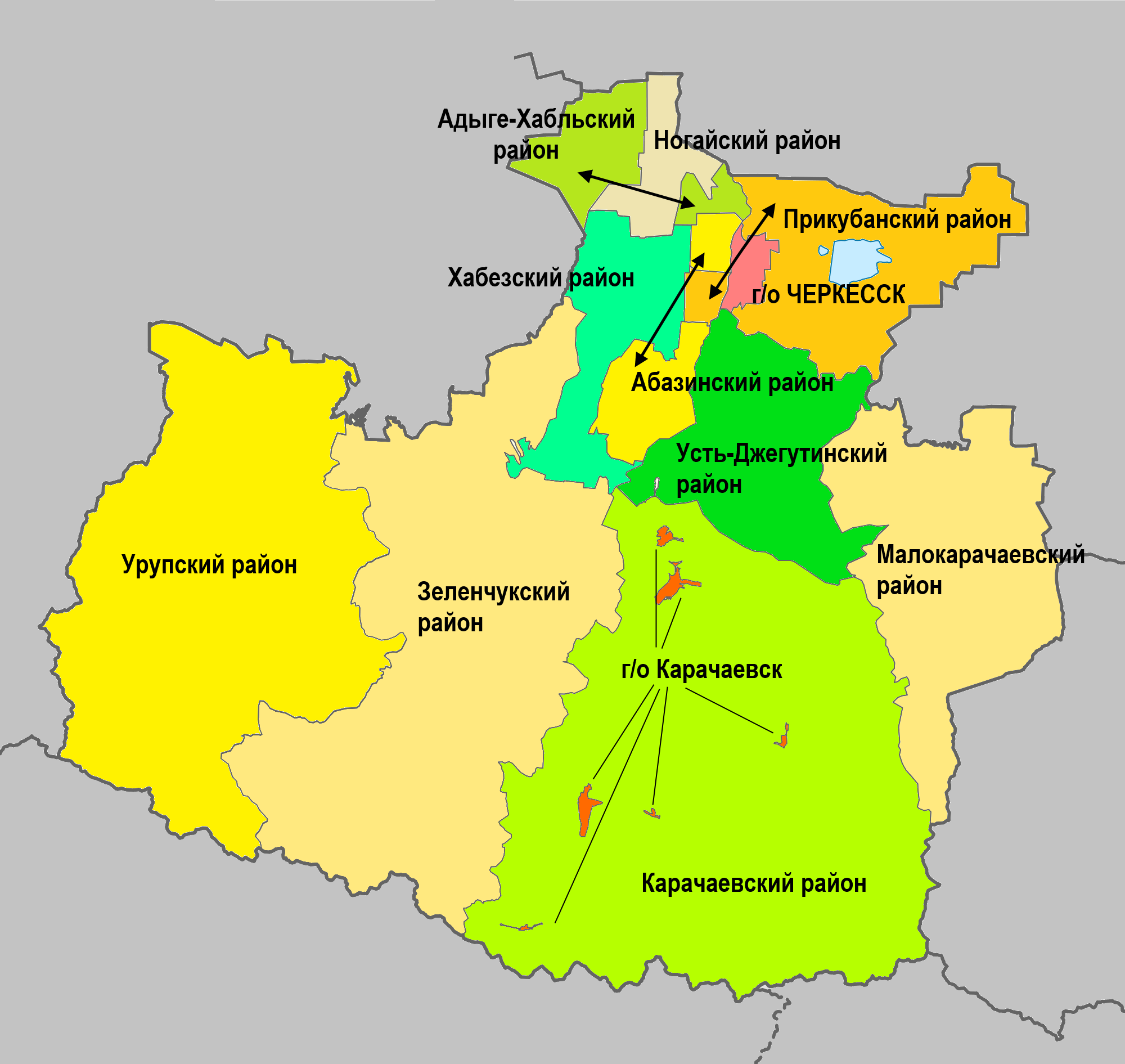
Map of Karachay-Cherkessia

Karachay-Cherkessia is a federal subject of Russia.

== Administrative and municipal divisions ==
- Cities and towns under republic's jurisdiction
  - Cherkessk (Черкесск) (capital)
  - Karachayevsk (Карачаевск)
    - Towns under the town's jurisdiction:
      - Teberda (Теберда)
    - Urban-type settlements under the town's jurisdiction:
      - Dombay resort settlement (Домбай)
      - Elbrussky (Эльбрусский)
      - Ordzhonikidzevsky (Орджоникидзевский)
- Districts:
  - Abazinsky (Абазинский)
  - Adyge-Khablsky (Адыге-Хабльский)
  - Karachayevsky (Карачаевский)
    - Urban-type settlements under the district's jurisdiction:
      - Novy Karachay (Новый Карачай)
      - Pravokubansky (Правокубанский)
  - Khabezsky (Хабезский)
  - Malokarachayevsky (Малокарачаевский)
  - Nogaysky (Ногайский)
  - Prikubansky (Прикубанский)
    - Urban-type settlements under the district's jurisdiction:
      - Udarny (Ударный)
  - Urupsky (Урупский)
    - Urban-type settlements under the district's jurisdiction:
      - Mednogorsky (Медногорский)
  - Ust-Dzhegutinsky (Усть-Джегутинский)
    - Towns under the district's jurisdiction:
      - Ust-Dzheguta (Усть-Джегута)
  - Zelenchuksky (Зеленчукский)
