= Simargl Air Company =

Russian airline

- Founded: 1997
- Ceased operations: 28 April 2017
- Hubs: Nalchik, Khabez
- Secondary hubs: Tyrnyauz
- Fleet size: 10
- Headquarters: Stavropol

Simargl Air provided charter passenger VIP, sightseeing and crop-spraying flights in the Caucasus region of Russia. It ceased operations on 28 April 2017.

== Destinations ==
- Sightseeing flights
  - Flying around on a circular route in Nalchik
  - Circled area of the Blue Lakes
  - Circled area Tyrnyauz
  - Circled area Adiyuh Palace (n.p. Habez, KCR) on a circular route
  - Circled area Dombai
  - Circled area Arkhyz
- Shuttle flights (Excursions)
  - Nalchik, Nalchik Chegem waterfalls, without landing
  - Nalchik, Nalchik, Blue Lakes, without boarding
  - Nalchik, Nalchik Bezengi gorge, without landing
  - Nalchik-area Tyrnyauz (rest), Nalchik
  - Tyrnyauz-V. Baksana-Tyrnyauz, without landing
  - Nalchik, Nalchik V.Baksan, without landing
  - Nalchik-Khabazi (CBD), Nalchik, without landing
  - Nalchik-Khabez (KCR), Nalchik, landing in Khabez
  - Khabez-Dombai (rest 2–3 hours) Khabez
  - Khabez-Arkhyz (rest 2–3 hours) Khabez
  - Khabez-mineral water-Khabez
  - Khabez-Stavropol-Khabez
  - Khabez-Nevynomysk-Khabez
  - Khabez-Armavir-Khabez
  - Nchk-Teberda/Dombay-Nalchik

== Fleet ==
Aircraft type	Active	Notes
Antonov An-2	3	
Mil Mi-2	5	
Mil Mi-8	2	
