= HAT-P-3b =

Jovian-sized exoplanet orbiting HAT-P-3

HAT-P-3b / Teberda
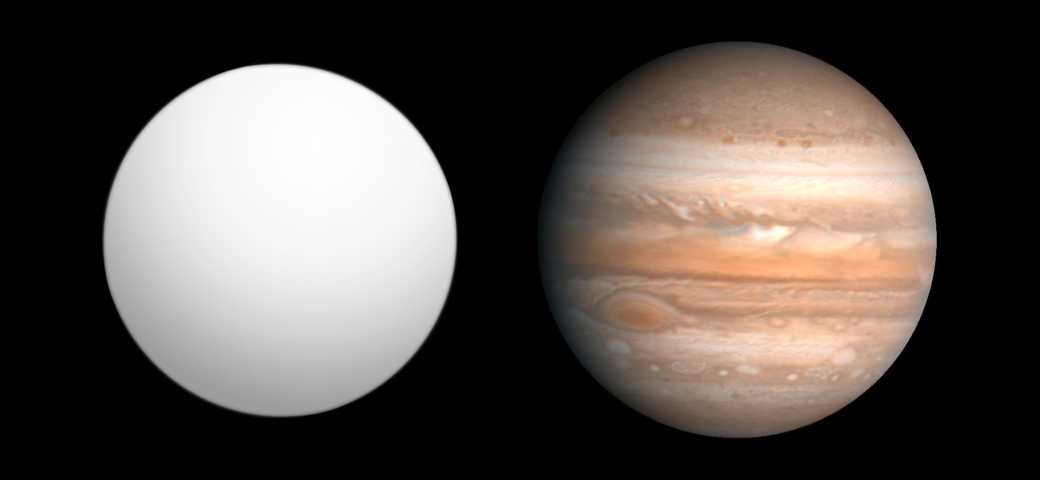
- Size comparison of HAT-P-3b (Teberda) with Jupiter

Discovery
- Discovered by: HATNet Project
- Discovery date: 28 July 2007
- Detection method: Transit

Orbital characteristics
- Semi-major axis: 0.03899+0.00062 −0.00065 AU
- Eccentricity: <0.0100
- Orbital period (sidereal): 2.8997360±0.0000020 d
- Inclination: 87.24
- Time of periastron: 2454218.7598 ± 0.0029
- Semi-amplitude: 89.1 ± 2.0
- Star: HAT-P-3

Physical characteristics
- Mean radius: 0.890 ± 0.046 R_{J}
- Mass: 0.609+0.021 −0.022 M_{J}
- Mean density: 1.06 ± 0.17 g/cm^{3}
- Surface gravity: 12.3 m/s^{2} (40 ft/s^{2})

HAT-P-3b, also named Teberda, is an extrasolar planet that orbits the star HAT-P-3 approximately 450 light-years away in the constellation of Ursa Major. It was discovered by the HATNet Project via the transit method and confirmed with Doppler spectroscopy, so both its mass and radius are known quite precisely. Based on these figures it is predicted that the planet has about 75 Earth masses' worth of heavy elements in its core, making it similar to the planet HD 149026 b.

The planet HAT-P-3b is named Teberda. The name was selected in the NameExoWorlds campaign by Russia, during the 100th anniversary of the IAU. Teberda is a mountain river in Dombay region (name of HAT-P-3).

In 2013, this planet was photometrically observed by Spitzer Space Telescope which characterized its near-zero eccentricity and low albedo.

== Discovery ==
In 2007 the HATNet Project reported the discovery of HAT-P-3b transiting the metal-rich early K dwarf star HAT-P-3 with an orbital period of 2.9 days. It was found with the 11 cm aperture HAT-5 telescope, located at the Fred Lawrence Whipple Observatory on Mount Hopkins in Arizona. Follow up radial velocity observations to confirm the planet were made with the 1.5 m Tillinghast reflector in order to rule out the possibility that the observed decrease in brightness was caused by an eclipsing binary. Final confirmation was made at the W. M. Keck Observatory using the HIRES spectrograph to measure the mass and orbital parameters of the planet.
