= Karachayevsky =

Karachayevsky (masculine), Karachayevskaya (feminine), or Karachayevskoye (neuter) may refer to:

- Karachayevsky District, a district of the Karachay-Cherkess Republic, Russia
- Karachayevsky Urban Okrug, a municipal formation in the Karachay-Cherkess Republic, Russia, which the Town of Republic Significance of Karachayevsk is incorporated as
