= Ust-Dzhegutinsky =

Ust-Dzhegutinsky (masculine), Ust-Dzhegutinskaya (feminine), or Ust-Dzhegutinskoye (neuter) may refer to:

- Ust-Dzhegutinsky District, a district of the Karachay-Cherkess Republic, Russia
- Ust-Dzhegutinskoye Urban Settlement, a municipal formation which the town of Ust-Dzheguta in Ust-Dzhegutinsky District of the Karachay-Cherkess Republic is incorporated as
