= Akhmat Salpagarov =

Russian politician (born 1962)

- Ахмат Салпагаров
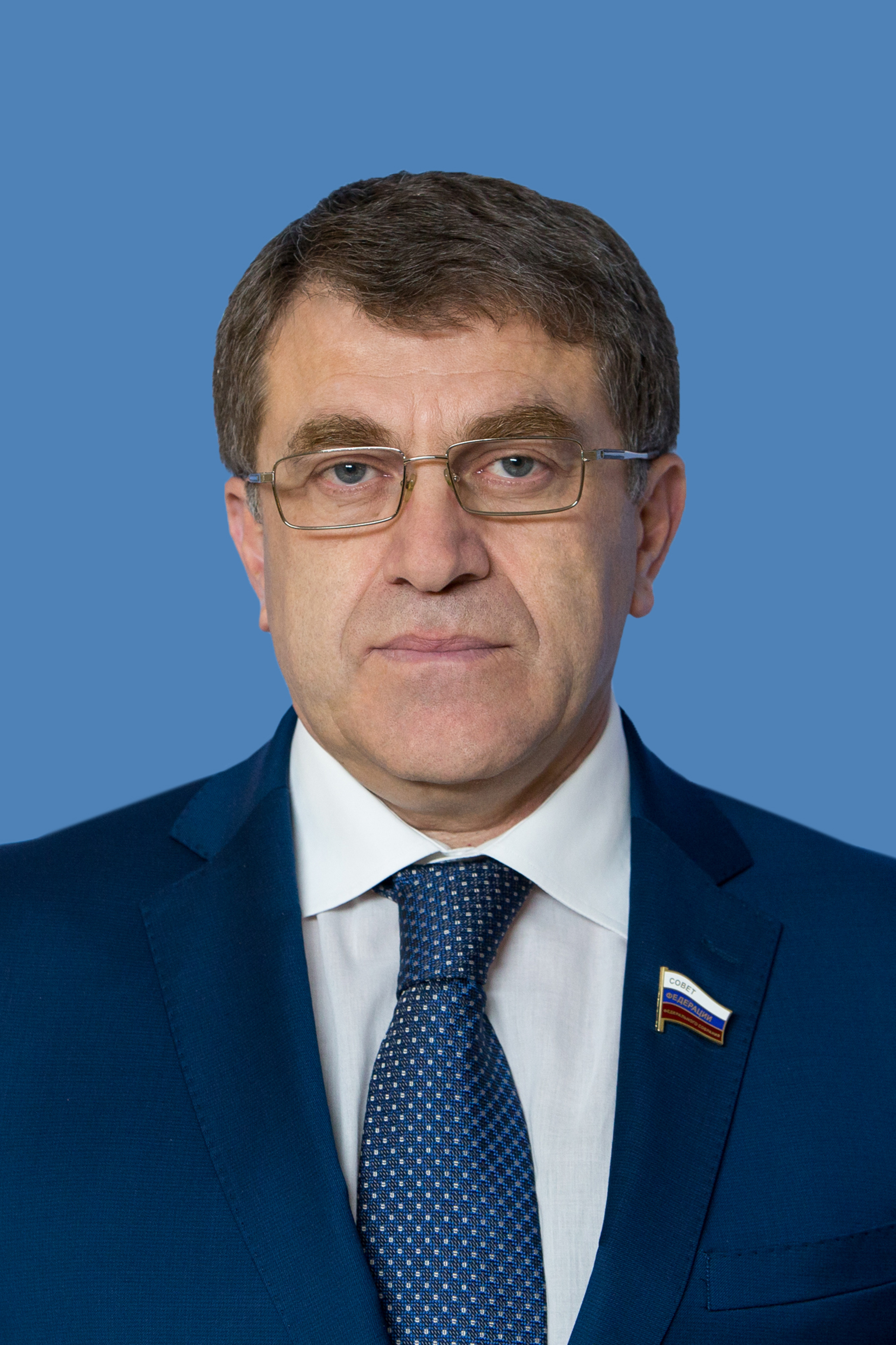

Senator from Karachay-Cherkessia
- Incumbent
- Assumed office 25 September 2019
- Preceded by: Murat Suyunchev

Personal details
- Born: Akhmat Salpagarov; 13 January 1962 (age 64) Novy Karachay, Karachayevsky District, Karachay-Cherkess Autonomous Oblast, Stavropol Krai, Russian Soviet Federative Socialist Republic, Soviet Union
- Party: United Russia
- Education: Stavropol State Agrarian University

Akhmat Anzorovich Salpagarov (Russian: Ахмат Анзорович Салпагаров; born 13 January 1962) is a Russian politician serving as a senator from Karachay-Cherkessia since 25 September 2019.

== Biography ==
Salpagarov was born on 13 January 1962 in Novy Karachay, Karachayevsky District. In 1984, he graduated from the Stavropol State Agrarian University. In 2005, Salpagarov also received a degree from the Russian State Social University. From 1978 to 2014, he occupied various positions in the private sector as commercial director, deputy head, and acting manager. In September 2014, he was elected deputy of the People's Assembly of Karachay-Cherkessia from the United Russia party. On 9 June 2015, he became the Senator from the People's Assembly of Karachay-Cherkessia. On 24 September 2019, he was re-elected.

Salpagarov is under personal sanctions introduced by the European Union, the United Kingdom, the USA, Canada, Switzerland, Australia, Ukraine, New Zealand, for ratifying the decisions of the "Treaty of Friendship, Cooperation and Mutual Assistance between the Russian Federation and the Donetsk People's Republic and between the Russian Federation and the Luhansk People's Republic" and providing political and economic support for Russia's annexation of Ukrainian territories.
