= Dombay =

Dombay (Russian: Домбай) is the name of several inhabited localities in Russia.

== Urban localities ==
- Dombay, Karachay-Cherkess Republic, a resort settlement under the administrative jurisdiction of the city of republic significance of Karachayevsk, Karachay-Cherkess Republic

== Rural localities ==
- Dombay, Omsk Oblast, an aul in Moskalensky Rural Okrug of Maryanovsky District of Omsk Oblast

== See also ==
- HAT-P-3, a star also named Dombay
