= Ordzhonikidzevsky District, Russia =

Location of the Republic of Khakassia

Ordzhonikidzevsky District is the name of several administrative and municipal districts in Russia, named after Sergo Ordzhonikidze, a Soviet statesman.

== Districts of the federal subjects ==
- Ordzhonikidzevsky District, Republic of Khakassia, an administrative and municipal district of the Republic of Khakassia

== City divisions ==
- Ordzhonikidzevsky City District, Magnitogorsk, a city district of Magnitogorsk, a city in Chelyabinsk Oblast
- Ordzhonikidzevsky City District, Novokuznetsk, a city district of Novokuznetsk, a city in Kemerovo Oblast
- Ordzhonikidzevsky City District, Perm, a city district of Perm, the administrative center of Perm Krai
- Ordzhonikidzevsky City District, Ufa, a city district of Ufa, the capital of the Republic of Bashkortostan
- Ordzhonikidzevsky City District, Yekaterinburg, a city district of Yekaterinburg, the administrative center of Sverdlovsk Oblast
Cities in Russia with a city division called "Ordzhonikidzevsky"

== Renamed districts ==
- Ordzhonikidzevsky District, name of Khangalassky District of the Sakha Republic until 1992

== See also ==
- Ordzhonikidzevsky (disambiguation)
- Ordzhonikidze (disambiguation)
