= Khumar (disambiguation) =

Khumar may refer to:

- Khumar, a ruined fortress in Northern Caucasus
- Khumar Barabankvi, an Urdu poet and lyricist from Barabanki, Uttar Pradesh, India
- Khumara Church, an early 10th-century church sited on the Kuban River, Russia
