= Zuhra Bayramkulova =

Farmer in the USSR

- Зухра Байрамкулова
- Born: 30 August 1940; Kislovodsk, Soviet Union
- Died: April 10, 2013 (aged 72); Uchkeken, Russia
- Occupation: Farmer
- Awards: Order of Lenin

Zuhra Abdurakhmanovna Bayramkulova (Russian: Зухра Абдурахмановна Байрамкулова; 30 August 1940 – 10 April 2013) was a farmer and politician from Karachay-Cherkessia.

== Biography ==
Bayramkulova was born on 30 August 1940 in the city of Kislovodsk in the Stavropol Krai. From 1956 to 1963 she held various jobs including at a cotton factory, on a construction site and as a farm worker. She joined the Communist Party in 1960.

== Career ==
In 1963 she became closely involved with dairy production at the Uchkekensky State Farm in Malokarachaevsky District. As a result of the developments she led at the Uchkekensky farm, Bayramkulova was awarded the title Hero of Socialist Labour with the Order of Lenin and the "Hammer & Sickle" medal. These improvements included agricultural production and the implementation of a five-year-plan for the sale of agricultural products to the state. She also represented the region and the state at agricultural competitions. She worked at the farm for thirty years and retired in the 1990s.

In 1976 she was a delegate at the 26th Congress of the CPSU. From 1978 to 1984 she was Deputy to the Supreme Soviet of the USSR. From 1990 she was a member of the Central Committee of the CPSU, defending the interests of Karachay-Cherkessia. In 2011 she travelled to St Petersberg with Patiy Shidakova and Datka Kishaev, who were both Socialist Labour Heroes to take part in the All-Russian Congress “Labour is the basis of life”, which was held on April 18.

Bayramkulova died on 10 April 2013. Her funeral was attended by representatives from across the Caucasus Republics, as well as faith leaders.

== Legacy ==
On what would have been Bayramkulova's 85th birthday in 2017, Rashid Temrezov the political leader of Karachay-Cherkessia, led tributes to her life. A street in her home village of Uchkeken was named after her.
