= Ordzhonikidzevsky =

Ordzhonikidzevsky (masculine), Ordzhonikidzevskaya (feminine), or Ordzhonikidzevskoye (neuter) may refer to several places named after Soviet political leader Grigoriy Ordzhonikidze:

- Ordzhonikidzevsky District, name of several districts in the former Soviet Union, preserved in Russian Federation
- Ordzhonikidzevsky (inhabited locality) (Ordzhonikidzevskaya, Ordzhonikidzevskoye), name of several inhabited localities in Russia

== See also ==
- Ordzhonikidze (disambiguation)
