= House of Tkhaghapseu =

Circassian house of peasant origin

House of Tkhaghapseu Тхьагъэпсэу Лъэпкъ
- Circassian house of peasant origin
- Parent house: House of Nartyzh
- Country: Shapsugia (formerly); Kabardia (formerly); Circassia (formerly); Russian Empire (formerly); Mountainous Republic of the Northern Caucasus (formerly); Soviet Union (formerly); Confederation of Mountain Peoples of the Caucasus(formerly); Russia; Turkey; Jordan
- Etymology: Tkhaghapseu (Тхьагъапсэу) meaning "God bless them" in Circassian
- Origin: Tkhaghapsh, Shapsugia, Circassia (present-day Tkhagapsh, Lazarevsky City District, Krasnodar Krai, Russia)
- Founded: Unknown
- Members: Tkhagapsov Medzhid Makhmudovich; Tkhagapsov Iskhan Amerzyanovich; Tkhagapsov Magchi M.; Tkhagapsov Mukhab Shukhambovich; Tkhagapsov Maskhud Pshigusovich; Tkhagapsov Magamet Indrisovich; Tkhagapsov Khasan Matuevich; Tkhagapsov Barasbiy Mudorovich; Tkhagapsov Zhamaldin Makhmudovich; Tkhagapsov Aves Shegubovich; Tkhagapsov Mukhat Shlubovich; Tkhagapsov Amin Uvzhukovich; Tkhagapsov Panu Zaramukovich; Tkhagapsov Murid Matovich; Tkhagapso Rashid Ibragimovich; Tkhagapso Garun Bicovich; Tkhagapso Yusuf Saferovich; Tkhagapso Mose Amerzanovich; Tkhagapso Madin Shumafovich; Tkhagapso Khachimzan Iskhakovich; Tkhagapso Yakhya Karbechevich; Tkhagapso Makhmud Yakhyavich; Tkhagapso Tuchek Moiseevich
- Traditions: Khabzeism; Sunni Islam
- Cadet branches: House of Aze

House of Tkhaghapseu (or Tkhagapso) (Adyghe: Тхьагъэпсэу Лъэпкъ, Russian: Тхагапсо or Тхагапсов, Turkish: Thağapsow Sülalesi) is a Circassian house of peasant (Adyghe: фэкъолӀ) origin of Shapsug tribe of Circassia. They are said to be one of the four largest houses of Circassians in terms of population. They are found all over the historical Circassia in the present day, in Adygea, Krasnodar Krai, Karachay-Cherkessia and Kabardino-Balkaria; as well as in Republic of Turkey and Hashemite Kingdom of Jordan due to Circassian genocide.

== Etymology ==
There are two distinct explanations of the roots of the surname.

The first and the less famous explanation is that the word Тхьагъэпсэу comes from two different roots, Тхьагъапщ and псэу - Тхьагъапщ being the name of the village where the house had emerged and псэу literally meaning "to live" - translating as "Those who live in Tkhaghapsh".

The widely accepted translation simply means "God bless them" in Circassian.

It tells about the story of three brothers of House of Nartyzh living in the village of Tkhaghapsh, (present-day Tkhagapsh, Lazarevsky City District, Krasnodar Krai, Russia) where a tyrannical feudal prince ruled over the region. The three brothers decided that the reign of the prince must end and he must pay for the atrocities he had committed with his life. They ambushed the prince and killed him, therefore the residents of the region praised them with words "may God bless them, may God bless them" and it stuck with them as a nickname, later to become their surname. The three brothers later fled the region, each leaving for different parts of Circassia in order to avoid the vengeance of the relatives of the tyrannical prince who they had killed. One of them fled to Takhtamukay in present-day Adygea, one of them fled to Khabez in present-day Karachay-Cherkessia and the last one fled to the village of Kuba in present-day Kabardino-Balkaria.

== Historical references ==
In 1856, in Bzhedugia, in the vicinity of the village of Ponezhukai, the peasants raised an uprising against the nobles and princes, called in Circassian history as "Pshchy-ork zau" (Пщы-оркъ зау). During the battle, Tkhagapso Azoko-Khadzhi is mentioned, who fought on the side of the peasants.

"...The Hanahoko troops entered the battle, but while they were in time for reinforcements from neighboring auls, the enemies, armed to the teeth, exterminated the people's militia. The prudent enemy destroyed the bridges over the Psekups River. Separate Tfekotl troops that broke through entered into a bon with them. The Tkhagapso - Azoko-Khadzhi detachment especially distinguished itself in it."
