= Ordzhonikidzevsky (inhabited locality) =

Ordzhonikidzevsky (Russian: Орджоники́дзевский; masculine), Ordzhonikidzevskaya (Орджоники́дзевская; feminine), or Ordzhonikidzevskoye (Орджоники́дзевское; neuter) is the name of several inhabited localities in Russia named after Soviet political leader Grigoriy Ordzhonikidze:

== Urban localities ==
- Ordzhonikidzevsky (urban-type settlement) under the administrative jurisdiction of the town of Karachayevsk in the Republic of Karachay–Cherkessia

== Rural localities ==
- Ordzhonikidzevskoye, a selo in Ordzhonikidzevsky District of the Republic of Khakasia
- Sunzha, fmr. Ordzhonikidzevskaya, a stanitsa in Sunzhensky District of the Republic of Ingushetia
