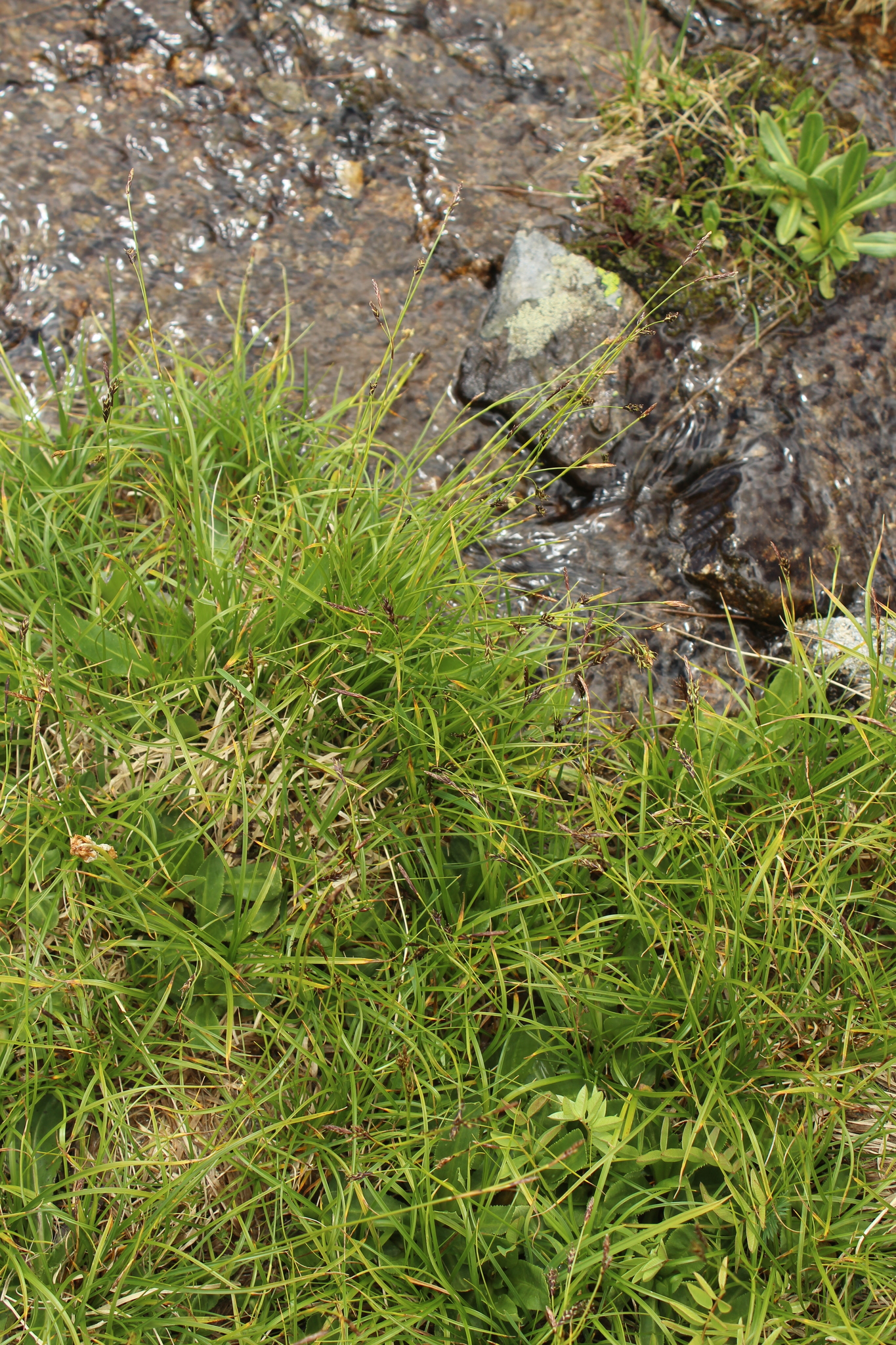
- In Teberda Nature Reserve

Scientific classification
- Kingdom: Plantae
- Clade: Tracheophytes
- Clade: Angiosperms
- Clade: Monocots
- Clade: Commelinids
- Order: Poales
- Family: Cyperaceae
- Genus: Carex
- Species: C. tristis

Binomial name
- Carex tristis M.Bieb.

Synonyms
- Carex aladagensis Kük. ex J.Schultze-Motel; Carex ferruginea Steven; Carex ferruginea subsp. tristis (M.Bieb.) Nyman; Carex hispidula subsp. karaczaica E.A.Busch; Carex meinshauseniana V.I.Krecz.; Carex schottii Boiss.; Carex sempervirens subsp. tristis (M.Bieb.) Kük.

= Carex tristis =

Species of flowering plant

Carex tristis is a species of sedge (family Cyperaceae), native to the Caucasus Mountains and adjoining areas. It is the most abundant plant species found on summits.
