= Eduard Baychora =

Russian football player

Personal information
- Full name: Eduard Muratovich Baychora
- Date of birth: 4 February 1992 (age 34)
- Place of birth: Uchkeken, Russia
- Height: 1.94 m (6 ft 4 1/2 in)
- Position: Goalkeeper

Senior career*
Years	Team	Apps	(Gls)
2009	FC Dynamo Krasnodar		
2010–2014	FC Kuban Krasnodar	0	(0)
2015–2017	FC Tosno	11	(0)
2017	FC Khimki	4	(0)
2018	FC Dynamo Stavropol	13	(1)
2018–2019	FC Mashuk-KMV Pyatigorsk	2	(0)
2019	FC Inter Cherkessk	10	(0)
2020	Qizilqum Zarafshon		
- * Club domestic league appearances and goals

Eduard Muratovich Baychora (Russian: Эдуард Муратович Байчора; born 4 February 1992) is a Russian former football player.

== Biography ==
Pupil of the reserve school of FC Kuban, first coach Andrey Viktorovich Yudin. In 2011 he was included in the official application of Kuban, played for the club in the tournament of the youth teams of the RFPL. In 2013 he was transferred to the main team. in the main squad of Kuban made his debut on October 31, 2013 in the cup match against the Ryazan "star". In the 2015/16 season, he moved to FC Tosno (St. Petersburg) with which he became the silver medalist of the FNL championship of the 2016/17 season. Member of the Europa League with FC Kuban (Krasnodar) of the 2013/14 season. March 31, 2018 scored a goal in the last minutes for FC Dynamo (Stavropol) against FC Afips (Afipsky)

== Club career ==
He made his debut in the Russian Football National League for FC Tosno on 21 September 2015 in a game against FC Luch-Energiya Vladivostok.

He played one game for the main squad of FC Kuban Krasnodar in the Russian Cup game against FC Zvezda Ryazan on 31 October 2013.

On 31 March 2018, he scored a late equalizer for FC Dynamo Stavropol against FC Afips Afipsky.
