= Abazakt =

Abazakt Абазакт Еджыбокъуей Гьабакъвайкыт
- Aul
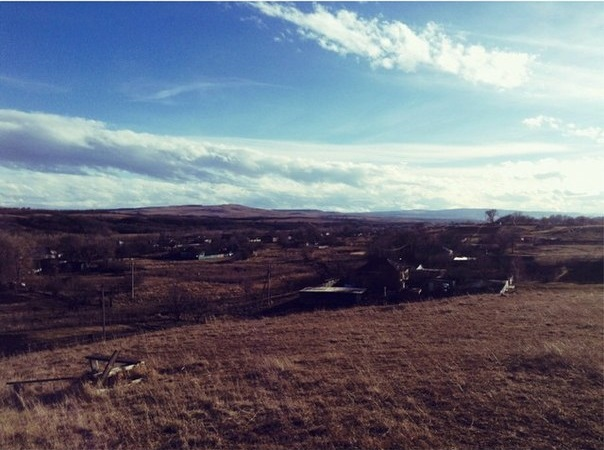

- Location within Karachay-Cherkessia Location within Russia
- Coordinates: 44.253333°N 41.901111°E
- Country: Russia
- Region: Karachay-Cherkessia
- District: Khabezsky District

Population
  - Total: 418
- Time zone: UTC+3:00

Abazakt (Russian: Абазакт; Kabardian: Еджыбокъуей; Abaza: Гьабакъвайкыт) is a rural locality (an aul) in Psauchye-Dakhskoye Rural Settlement of Khabezsky District, Russia. The population was 423 as of 2010.

== History ==
Its history dates back to 1862 when it was founded in its current location. Prior to this, the village was known as Yegibokovsky and was situated between the Urup and Kyafar rivers.

In 1929, the village of Yegibokovsky was officially renamed Abazakt by a decree of the Presidium of the All-Russian Central Executive Committee. The name is derived from the ethnonym "abaza" and the word "kyt" meaning village.

In 1957, the village was transferred to the jurisdiction of the Psauche-Dakhsky village council.

== Geography ==
The aul is located on the left bank of the Maly Zelenchuk River, 29 km north of Khabez (the district's administrative centre) by road. Novo-Khumarinsky is the nearest rural locality.

== Streets ==
- Dzhambekova
- Kalmykova
- Podgornaya
- Pushkina
- SKP Abazakt Uchastok
- Central'naya
- A.Dzhilakanova
- Novaya Ulica
