= Teberda (river) =

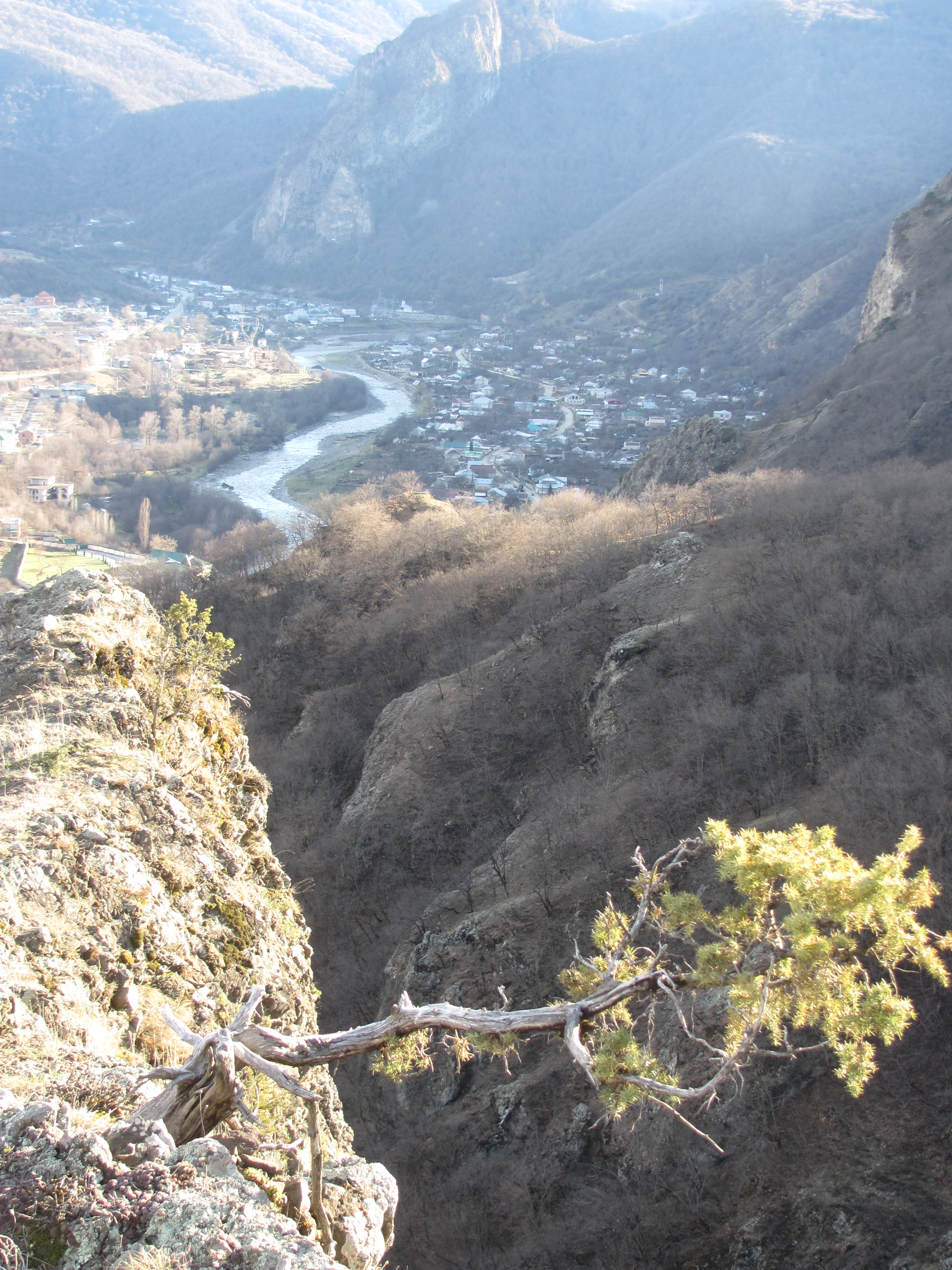
- The Teberda near Karachayevsk

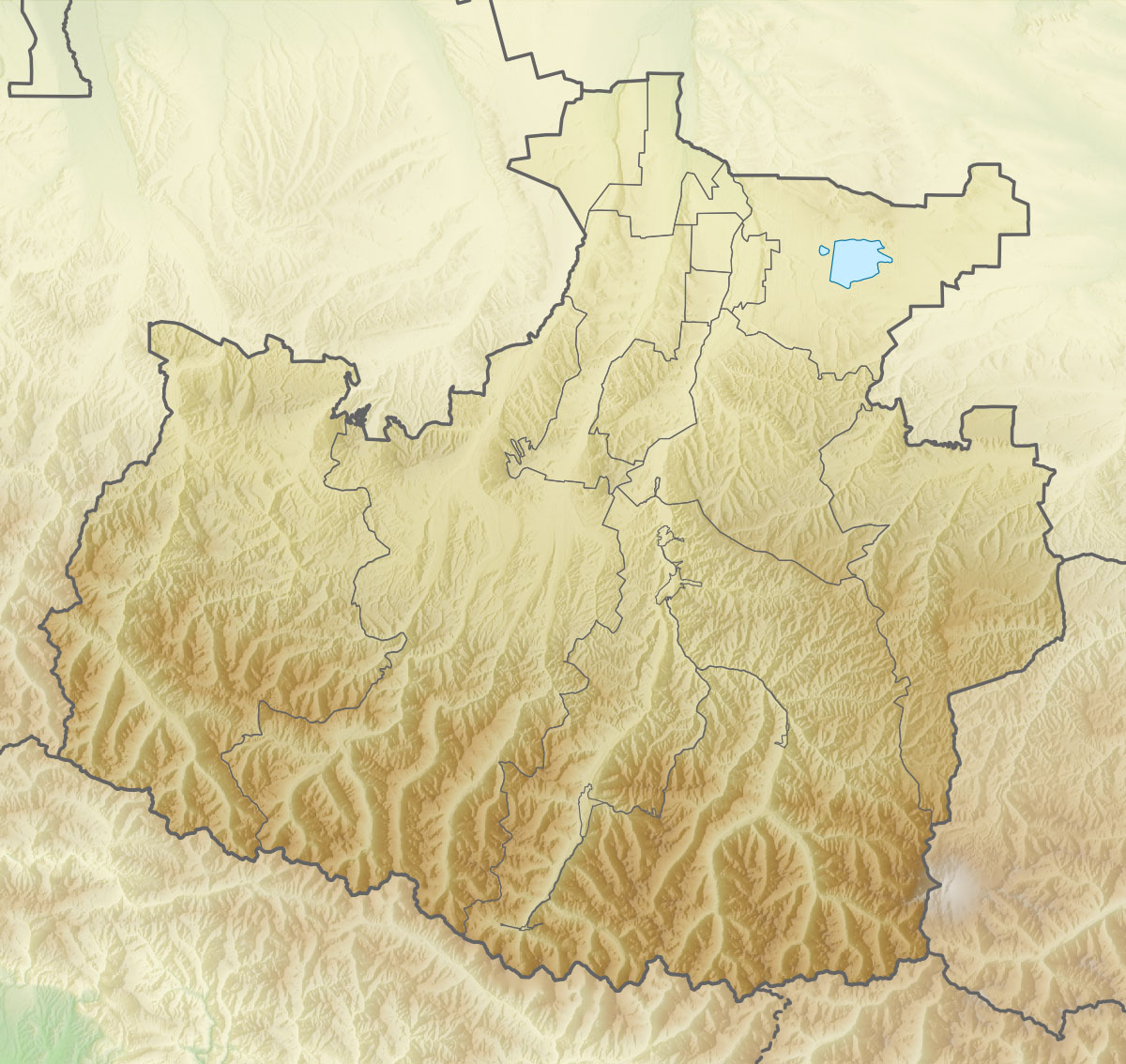
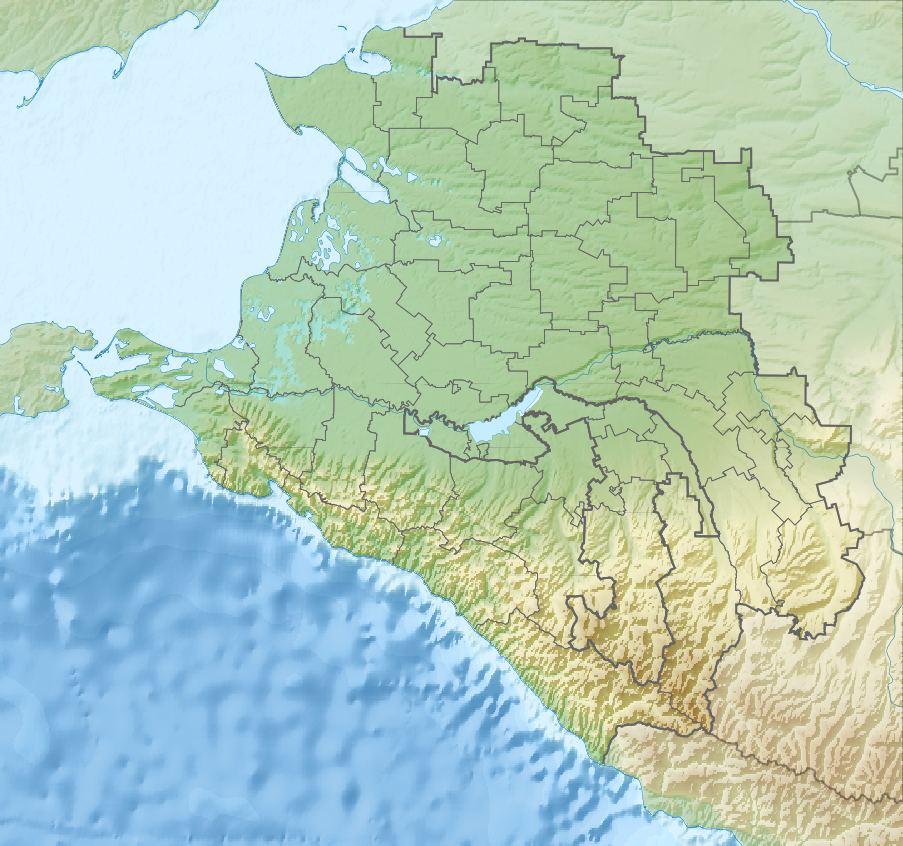
- Location within Karachay-Cherkessia Location within Krasnodar Krai Location within Caucasus Mountains Location within European Russia

Physical characteristics
- Mouth: Kuban
  - coordinates: 43°46′38″N 41°55′00″E
- Length: 60 km (37 mi)
- Basin size: 1,080 km^{2} (420 sq mi)

Basin features
- Progression: Kuban→ Sea of Azov

The Teberda (Russian: Теберда́) is a river in the North Caucasus. It is a left tributary of the Kuban. It flows past the Teberda Nature Reserve, through the town Teberda and terminates at Karachayevsk. It is 60 kilometres (37 mi) long, and has a drainage basin of 1,080 square kilometres (420 sq mi).

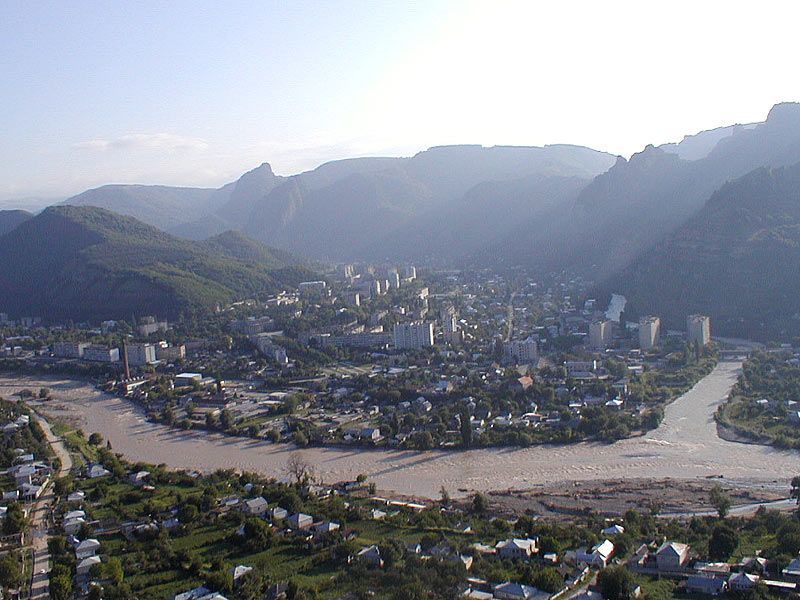
Mouth of the Teberda at Karachayevsk
