= Khumar =

Coordinates: 43°52′4.87″N 41°55′26.35″E

Fortifications of the Khumarin settlement by Bidjiev H. H.

Khumarinskoye gorodishche (Russian: Хумаринское городище) or Khumar is a ruined medieval fortress on the top of Mount Kalezh above the Kuban Gorge in the Greater Caucasus, near Khumara village, Karachaevsky district, Karachay–Cherkessia, Russia.

The site was investigated in 1960 and 1962 by V.A. Kuznetsov after the slabs with runic inscriptions were found, but without excavations. In 1963 and 1964 archaeological expedition of Karachaevo-Cherkessky research institute, led by E.P. Alekseeva, conducted excavations in the site. She found out that under medieval strata lay those of 8-6 centuries BC. A. Gadlo and Kh. Bidjiev discovered in 1974 remains of defense system - towers, walls.

The fortress, situated 11 km (7 mi) downstream from Karachaevsk and formerly accessed only by ladder, occupies some forty hectares on top of a large plateau. The 18-foot (5.5 m) high walls, with twelve bastions, were pierced by a single 5-metre-wide gate. The fortifications are supposed to have been constructed either by the Khazars or by the Bulgars in connection with the Khazar-Arab Wars.

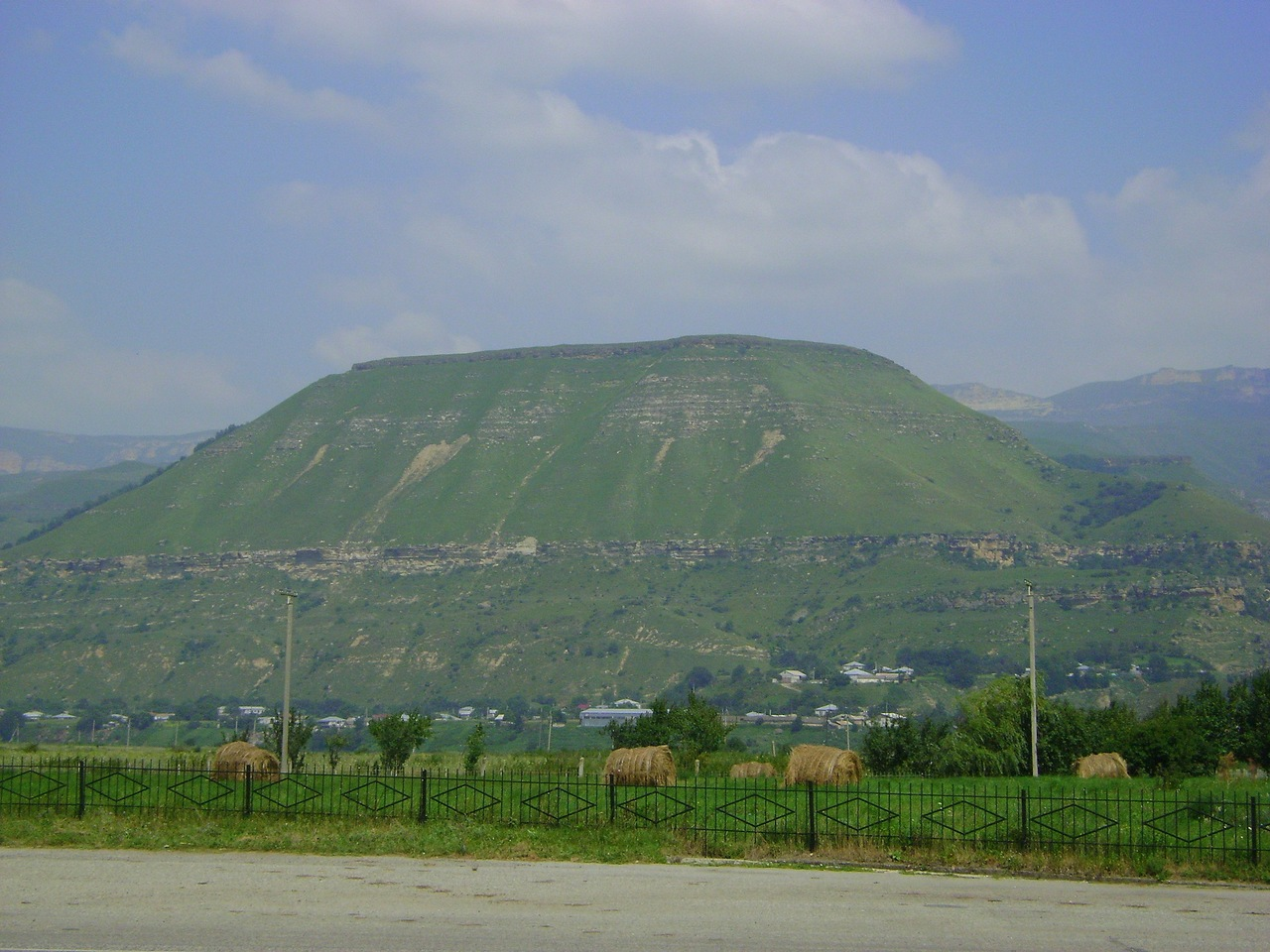
Mount Kalezh

The site is rich in pseudo-runic inscriptions, an evidence of early medieval Turkic occupation by tribes of the Saltovo-Mayaki cultural group. Most of the inscriptions were heavily damaged by locals and are illegible.

Among the more controversial finds from the site was a folding, modular altar unearthed in the area. Scholars at the archaeological museum in Rostov-on-Don asserted that the altar was part of a Khazar Jewish shrine built in imitation of the Biblical mishkan.

In the 9th and 10th centuries, it was the site of a populous town, mentioned in Byzantine and Georgian sources as Skhimar (Russian: Схимар). It is believed that St. Maximus the Confessor was held there during his exile to the Caucasus. Within four kilometers from the fortress stands the Shoana Church (ca. 925), first described by Abraham Firkovich in 1848.

The town was destroyed by Timur during his invasion of the Golden Horde in 1396.
