= HAT-P-3 =

Star in the constellation Ursa Major

HAT-P-3 / Dombay
Observation data Epoch J2000 Equinox ICRS
- Constellation: Ursa Major
- Right ascension: 13^{h} 44^{m} 22.5937^{s}
- Declination: +48° 01′ 43.206″
- Apparent magnitude (V): 11.577(67)

Characteristics
- Evolutionary stage: main sequence
- Spectral type: K5
- Apparent magnitude (B): 12.53(20)
- Apparent magnitude (V): 11.577(67)
- Apparent magnitude (I): 10.504(79)
- Apparent magnitude (J): 9.936(22)
- Apparent magnitude (H): 9.542(28)
- Apparent magnitude (K): 9.448(25)
- Variable type: planetary transit

Astrometry
| Radial velocity (R_{v}) | −23.8±0.1 km/s |
| Proper motion (μ) | RA: −19.619(12) mas/yr Dec.: −23.973(15) mas/yr |
| Parallax (π) | 7.4159±0.0143 mas |
| Distance | 439.8 ± 0.8 ly (134.8 ± 0.3 pc) |
| Absolute magnitude (M_{V}) | 5.87(15) |

Details
| Mass | 0.925+0.031 −0.0134 M_{☉} |
| Radius | 0.850+0.021 −0.010 R_{☉} |
| Luminosity | 0.435(53) L_{☉} |
| Surface gravity (log g) | 4.58(10) cgs |
| Temperature | 5,190(80) K |
| Metallicity [Fe/H] | 0.24(8) dex |
| Rotational velocity (v sin i) | 1.4(5) km/s |
| Age | 2.9+1.7 −3.7 Myr |

Other designations
- Dombay, TOI-1419, TIC 311035838, TYC 3466-819-1, GSC 03466-00819, 2MASS J13442258+4801432, HAT-P-3

Database references
| SIMBAD | data |
| Exoplanet Archive | data |

HAT-P-3, is a metal-rich K5 dwarf star located about 441 light-years away in the constellation Ursa Major. At a magnitude of about 11.5 it is not visible to the naked eye but is visible in a small to medium-sized amateur telescope. It is believed to be a relatively young star and has a slightly enhanced level of chromospheric activity.

The star HAT-P-3 is named Dombay. The name was selected in the NameExoWorlds campaign by Russia, during the 100th anniversary of the IAU. Dombay is a resort region in the North Caucasus mountains.

== Planetary system ==
This star is home to the extrasolar planet HAT-P-3b, later named Teberda, discovered by the HATNet Project using the transit method.

The HAT-P-3 planetary system
| Companion (in order from star) | Mass | Semimajor axis (AU) | Orbital period (days) | Eccentricity | Inclination (°) | Radius |
|---|---|---|---|---|---|---|
| b / Teberda | 0.609+0.021 −0.022 M_{J} | 0.03899+0.00062 −0.00065 | 2.8997360±0.0000020 | <0.0100 | 87.07 ± 0.55 | 0.827 ± 0.055 R_{J} |

== See also ==
- List of transiting extrasolar planets
