= Inzhich-Chukun =

Rural locality in Abazinsky District, Karachay-Cherkess Republic, Russia

Coordinates: 44°03′N 41°47′E

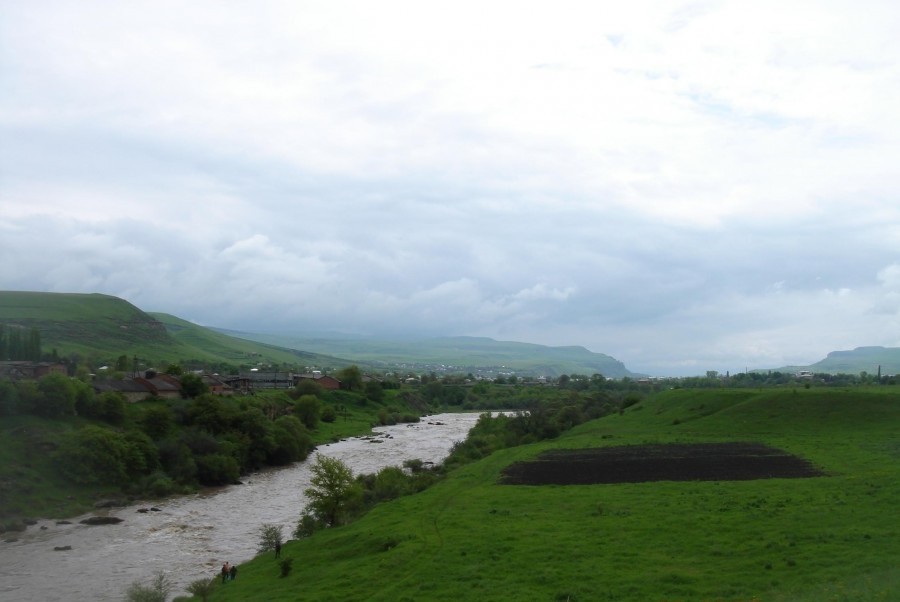
Landscape in Inzhick-Chukun

Inzhich-Chukun (Russian: Инжич-Чукун; Abaza: Йынджьыгь-Чӏкӏвын) is a rural locality (an aul) and the administrative center of Abazinsky District in the Karachay-Cherkess Republic, Russia, located on the banks of the Maly Zelenchuk River. Population: 2,592 (2010 census); mostly Abazins.

It was founded by Russians in 1861. In 1925, its original name Zelenchuksko-Loovsky (Зеленчукско-Лоовский) was changed to Inzhich-Chukun, the Russified local name of Maly Zelenchuk, as a part of a campaign to remove the names of nobility (Loovsky in this case) from the toponyms.

Inzhich-Chukun was a part of Khabezsky District prior to creation of Abazinsky District in 2006.
