= Ordzhonikidzevsky District =

Ordzhonikidzevsky District may refer to several places named after Soviet political leader Grigoriy Ordzhonikidze:

- Ordzhonikidzevsky District, Russia, name of several districts and city districts in Russia
- Ordzhonikidzivsky Raion, former name of a city district in Mariupol, Ukraine
- Ordzhonikidzivsky Raion, former name of a city district in Zaporizhzhia, Ukraine
