= Abaza-Khabl =

Abaza-Khabl Абаза-Хабль Абаза Хӏабла
- Village
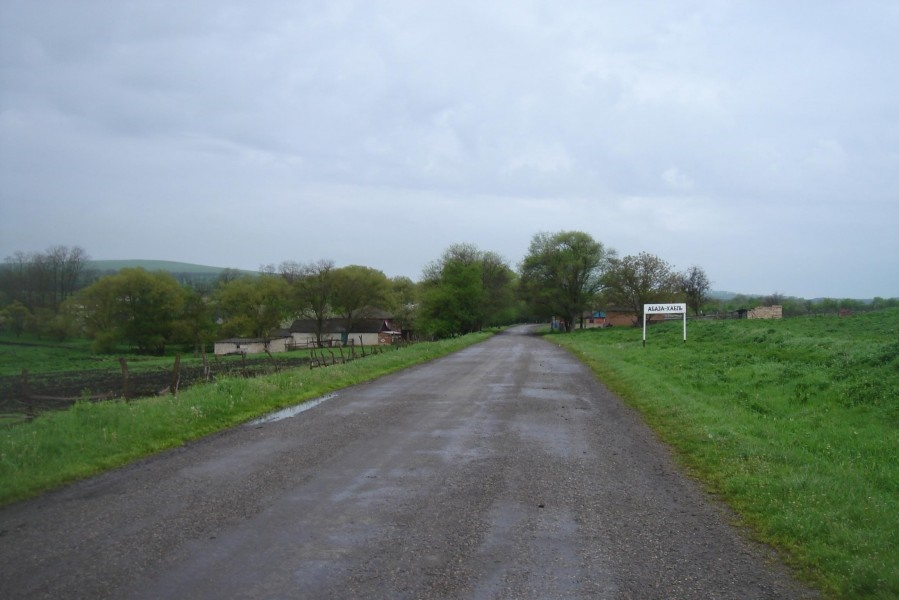
- Entrance to the village of Abaza-Khabl

- Location within Karachay-Cherkessia Location within Russia
- Coordinates: 44.370833°N 41.638889°E
- Country: Russia
- Region: Karachay-Cherkessia
- District: Adyge-Khablsky District
- Time zone: UTC+3:00

Abaza-Khabl (Russian: Абаза-Хабль; Abaza: Абаза Хӏабла) is a rural locality (an aul) in Grushkinskoye Rural Settlement of Adyge-Khablsky District, Russia. The population was 577 as of 2010.

== History ==
The village of Abaza-Khablin was established in 1928 by settlers from the village of Elburgan. The name of the settlement originates from the Abaza language, and it can be translated as "Abaza village". In 1929, it became part of the newly formed Grushkinsky Village Council.

== Geography ==
Abaza-Khabl is located in the southwestern part of the western zone of the Adyge-Khablsky district, situated on both banks of the Maly Shcheblonok River. The village is 42 km (by road) west of the regional center, Adyge-Khabl, and 60 km northwest of the city of Cherkessk. It borders the settlements of Grushka to the east, Tapanta to the southeast, and Novo-Urupsky to the west.

The village is located in the foothill forest-steppe zone of Dagestan and is situated on a plateau-like upland between the Urup and Big Zelenchuk rivers. The terrain is predominantly hilly with rolling plains and an average height of 644 meters above sea level. The soil cover is diverse, with pre-Caucasian and foothill chernozems and floodplain meadow soils in the floodplain.

The hydrographic network is primarily represented by the Maly Shcheblonok River and close-to-surface groundwater. The climate is moderately warm with an average annual air temperature of around +9 °C. The average July temperature is +20 °C, and the average January temperature is −2 °C, with a minimum of −32 °C and a maximum of +40 °C. The growing season lasts 210 days and the average annual rainfall is around 700 mm, mostly occurring from May to July. East and northeast winds, reaching speeds of 20–30 m/s, often dominate in winter and spring.

== Streets ==
- Oktyabrskaya
- Pervomayskaya
