= Pravokubansky =

Pravokubansky Правокубанский
- Settlement
- Interactive map of Pravokubansky
- Location of Pravokubansky Pravokubansky (Karachay-Cherkessia)
- Coordinates: 43°55′N 41°53′E
- Country: Russia
- Federal subject: Karachay-Cherkessia
- Administrative district: Karachayevsky District
- Founded: 1984
- Urban-type settlement status since: 1984

Population (2010 Census)
  - Total: 3,187
  - Estimate (2025): 3,330 (+4.5%)

Municipal status
  - Municipal district: Karachayevsky Municipal District
  - Urban settlement: Pravokubanskoye Urban Settlement
  - Capital of: Pravokubanskoye Urban Settlement
- Time zone: UTC+3 (MSK)
- Postal code: 369244
- OKTMO ID: 91615157051

Pravokubansky population
- 2010 Census: 3,187
- 2002 Census: 2,958
- 1989 Census: 3,627

Pravokubansky (Russian: Правокубанский) is an urban locality (a settlement) in Karachayevsky District of the Karachay-Cherkess Republic, Russia. As of the 2010 Census, its population was 3,187.

== History ==
It was granted urban-type settlement status in 1984.

== Administrative and municipal status ==
Within the framework of administrative divisions, the settlement of Pravokubansky is subordinated to Karachayevsky District. As a municipal division, Pravokubansky is incorporated within Karachayevsky Municipal District as Pravokubanskoye Urban Settlement.
