= Udarny, Karachay-Cherkess Republic =

Udarny Ударный
- Work settlement
- Interactive map of Udarny
- Location of Udarny Udarny (Karachay-Cherkessia)
- Coordinates: 44°21′N 42°31′E
- Country: Russia
- Federal subject: Karachay-Cherkessia
- Administrative district: Prikubansky District
- Founded: 1961
- Urban-type settlement status since: 1965

Population (2010 Census)
  - Total: 1,083
  - Estimate (2025): 1,006 (−7.1%)

Municipal status
  - Municipal district: Prikubansky Municipal District
  - Urban settlement: Udarnenskoye Urban Settlement
  - Capital of: Udarnenskoye Urban Settlement
- Time zone: UTC+3 (MSK)
- Postal code: 369114
- OKTMO ID: 91625158051

Udarny population
- 2010 Census: 1,083
- 2002 Census: 1,137
- 1989 Census: 1,221
- 1979 Census: 1,314

Udarny (Russian: Уда́рный) is an urban locality (a work settlement) in Prikubansky District of the Karachay-Cherkess Republic, Russia. As of the 2010 Census, its population was 1,083.

== History ==
It was established in 1961 and granted urban-type settlement status in 1965.

== Administrative and municipal status ==
Within the framework of administrative divisions, the work settlement of Udarny is subordinated to Prikubansky District. As a municipal division, Udarny is incorporated within Prikubansky Municipal District as Udarnenskoye Urban Settlement.
