= Prikubansky District, Karachay-Cherkess Republic =

Prikubansky District Прикубанский район (Russian)
- District

Other transcription(s)
  - Karachay-Balkar: Къобан район
  - Kabardian: Прикубанскэ район
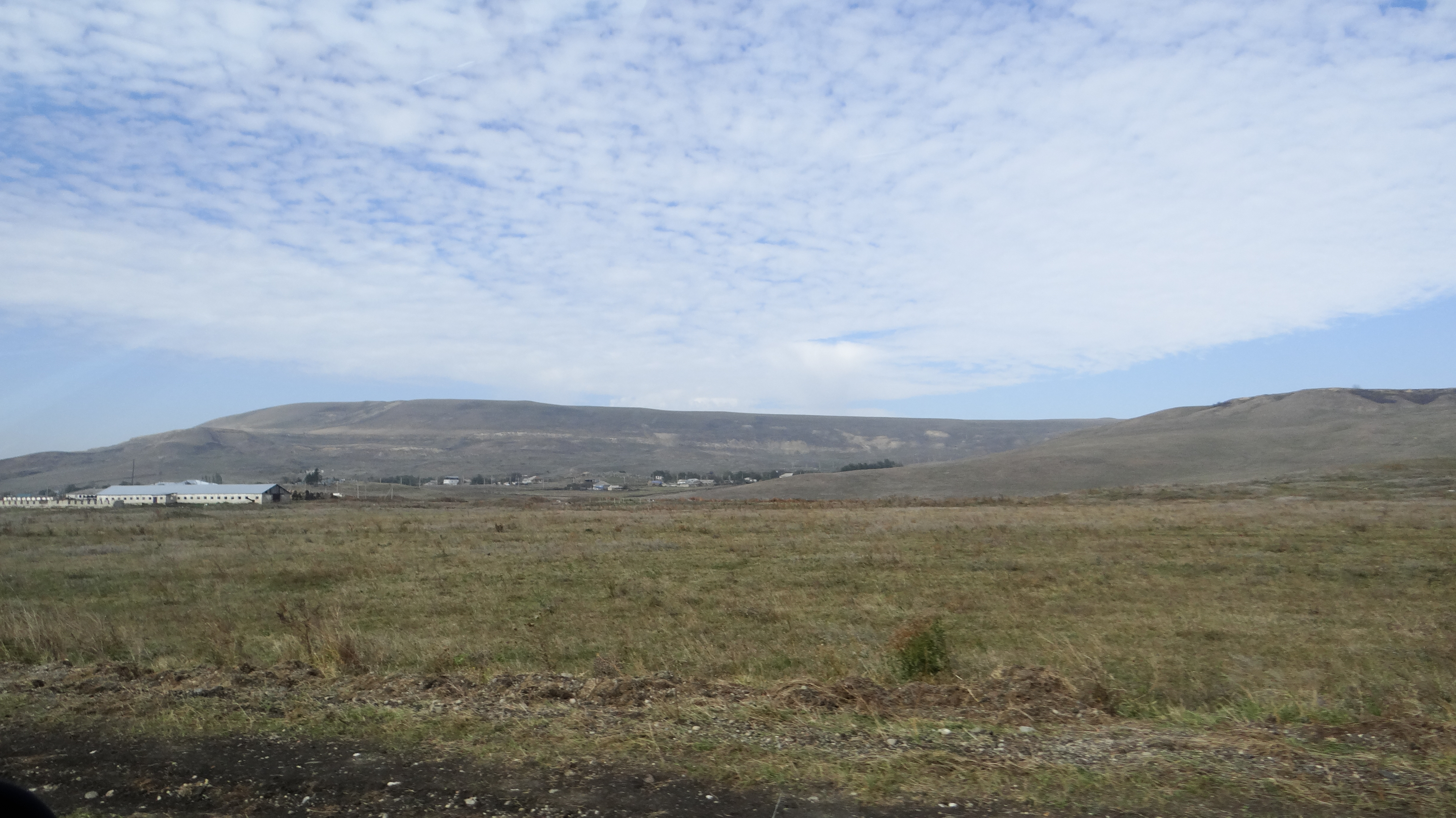
- Landscape in Prikubansky District
- Location of Prikubansky District in the Karachay-Cherkess Republic
- Coordinates: 44°16′N 42°14′E
- Country: Russia
- Federal subject: Karachay-Cherkess Republic
- Established: 1936
- Administrative center: Kavkazsky

Area
  - Total: 960 km^{2} (370 sq mi)

Population (2010 Census)
  - Total: 29,343
  - Density: 31/km^{2} (79/sq mi)
  - Urban: 3.7%
  - Rural: 96.3%

Administrative structure
  - Inhabited localities: 1 urban-type settlements, 23 rural localities

Municipal structure
  - Municipally incorporated as: Prikubansky Municipal District
  - Municipal divisions: 1 urban settlements, 11 rural settlements
- Time zone: UTC+3 (MSK)
- OKTMO ID: 91625000
- Website: http://www.admprik.ru

Population of Prikubansky District
- 2010 Census: 29,343
- 2002 Census: 35,547
- 1989 Census: 32,693
- 1979 Census: 31,353

Prikubansky District (Russian: Прикуба́нский райо́н; Karachay-Balkar: Къобан район, Qoban rayon; Kabardian: Прикубанскэ район) is an administrative and a municipal district (raion), one of the ten in the Karachay-Cherkess Republic, Russia. It is located in the northeast of the republic. The area of the district is 960 square kilometers (370 sq mi). Its administrative center is the rural locality (a settlement) of Kavkazsky. As of the 2010 Census, the total population of the district was 29,343, with the population of Kavkazsky accounting for 10.3% of that number.

== Administrative and municipal status ==
Within the framework of administrative divisions, Prikubansky District is one of the ten in the Karachay-Cherkess Republic and has administrative jurisdiction over one urban-type settlement (Udarny) and twenty-three rural localities. As a municipal division, the district is incorporated as Prikubansky Municipal District. The urban-type settlement of Udarny is incorporated into an urban settlement, while the twenty-three rural localities are incorporated into eleven rural settlements within the municipal district. The settlement of Kavkazsky serves as the administrative center of both the administrative and municipal district.
