= Kavkazsky, Karachay-Cherkess Republic =

Rural locality in Karachay-Cherkessia, Russia

Coordinates: 44°15′59″N 42°13′55″E

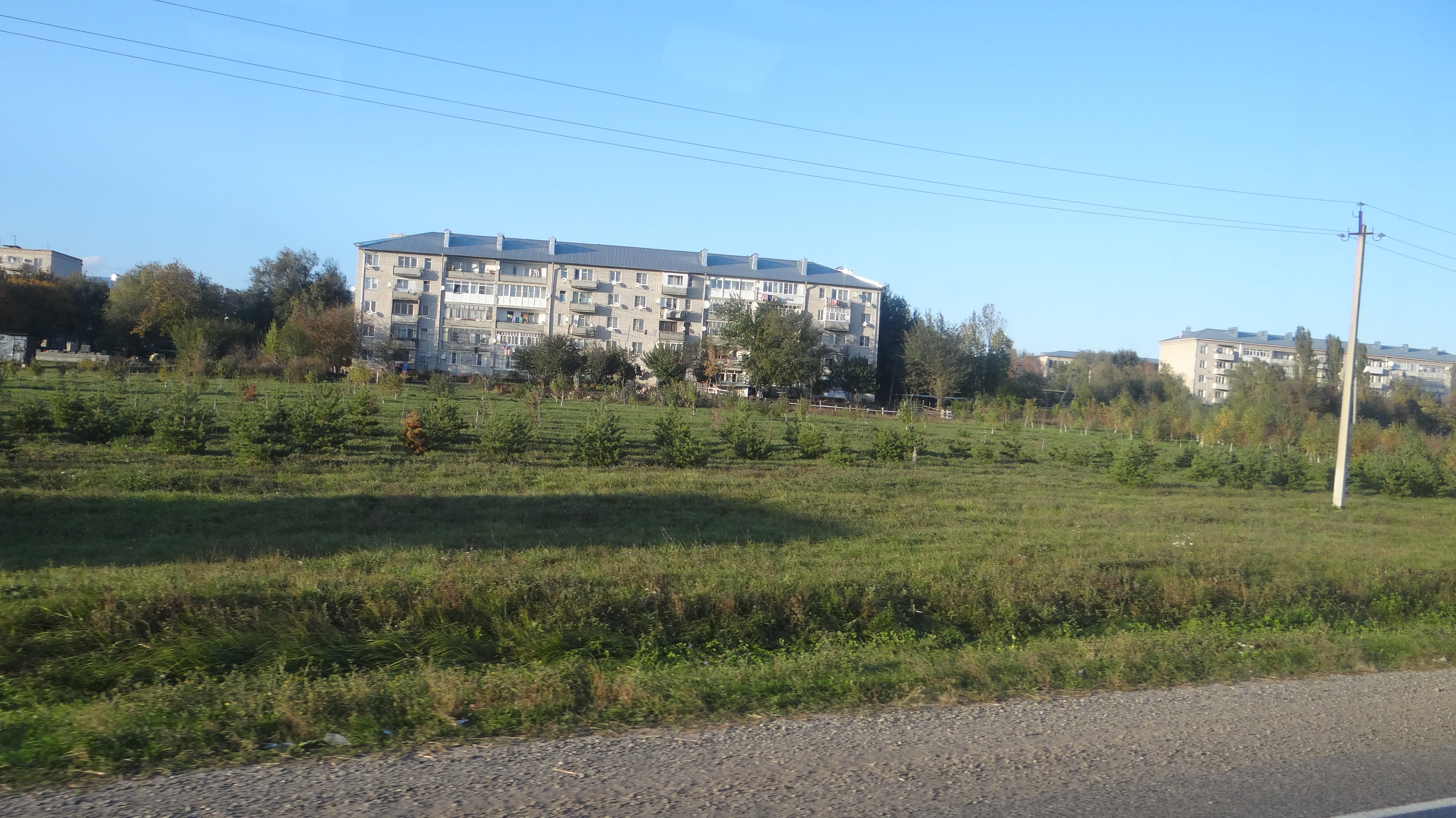

Kavkazsky (Russian: Кавказский, Karachay-Balkar: Кавказский) is a rural locality (a settlement) and the administrative center of Prikubansky District of the Karachay-Cherkess Republic, Russia. Population: 3,022 (2010 census); 3,039 (2002 census); 3,771 (1989 Soviet census).
