= Mednogorsky =

Mednogorsky Медногорский
- Work settlement
- Interactive map of Mednogorsky
- Location of Mednogorsky Mednogorsky (Karachay-Cherkessia)
- Coordinates: 43°55′N 41°11′E
- Country: Russia
- Federal subject: Karachay-Cherkessia
- Administrative district: Urupsky District
- Founded: 1961
- Urban-type settlement status since: 1981
- Elevation: 870 m (2,850 ft)

Population (2010 Census)
  - Total: 5,960
  - Estimate (2025): 5,459 (−8.4%)

Municipal status
  - Municipal district: Urupsky Municipal District
  - Urban settlement: Mednogorskoye Urban Settlement
  - Capital of: Mednogorskoye Urban Settlement
- Time zone: UTC+3 (MSK)
- Postal code: 369281
- OKTMO ID: 91630158051

Mednogorsky population
- 2010 Census: 5,960
- 2002 Census: 4,309
- 1989 Census: 5,516

Mednogorsky (Russian: Медного́рский) is an urban locality (a work settlement) in Urupsky District of the Karachay-Cherkess Republic, Russia. As of the 2010 Census, its population was 5,960.

== History ==
It was established in 1961 and granted urban-type settlement status in 1981.

== Administrative and municipal status ==
Within the framework of administrative divisions, the work settlement of Mednogorsky is subordinated to Urupsky District. As a municipal division, Mednogorsky is incorporated within Urupsky Municipal District as Mednogorskoye Urban Settlement.
