= Ust-Dzhegutinsky District =

Ust-Dzhegutinsky District Усть-Джегутинский район (Russian)
- District

Other transcription(s)
  - Karachay-Balkar: Джёгетей Аягъы район
  - Abaza: Усть-Джьгваты район
  - Kabardian: Жэгуэтэныпэ куей
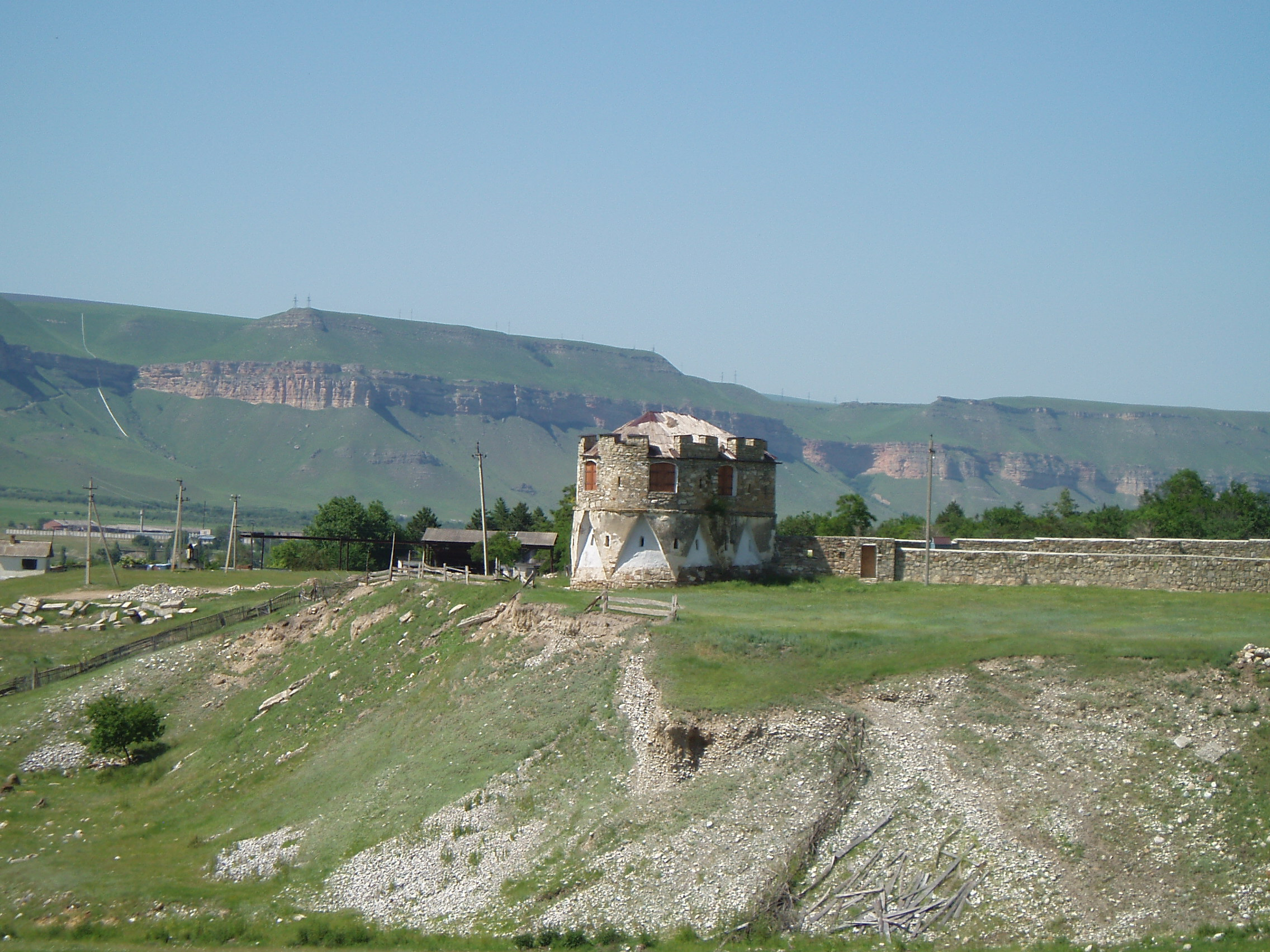
- Remains of the former Krasnogorsk Fortress in the stanitsa of Krasnogorskaya in Ust-Dzhegutinsky District
- Location of Ust-Dzhegutinsky District in the Karachay-Cherkess Republic
- Coordinates: 44°06′N 41°59′E
- Country: Russia
- Federal subject: Karachay-Cherkess Republic
- Established: 1957
- Administrative center: Ust-Dzheguta

Area
  - Total: 992 km^{2} (383 sq mi)

Population (2010 Census)
  - Total: 50,641
  - Density: 51.0/km^{2} (132/sq mi)
  - Urban: 60.4%
  - Rural: 39.6%

Administrative structure
  - Inhabited localities: 1 cities/towns, 9 rural localities

Municipal structure
  - Municipally incorporated as: Ust-Dzhegutinsky Municipal District
  - Municipal divisions: 1 urban settlements, 7 rural settlements
- Time zone: UTC+3 (MSK)
- OKTMO ID: 91635000
- Website: http://udmunicipal.ru/

Ust-Dzhegutinsky District (Russian: Усть-Джегути́нский райо́н; Karachay-Balkar: Джёгетей Аягъы район, Cögetey Ayağı rayon; Abaza: Усть-Джьгваты район; Kabardian: Жэгуэтэныпэ куей) is an administrative and a municipal district (raion), one of the ten in the Karachay-Cherkess Republic, Russia. It is located in the northeast of the republic. The area of the district is 992 square kilometers (383 sq mi). Its administrative center is the town of Ust-Dzheguta. As of the 2010 Census, the total population of the district was 50,641, with the population of Ust-Dzheguta accounting for 60.4% of that number.

== Administrative and municipal status ==
Within the framework of administrative divisions, Ust-Dzhegutinsky District is one of the ten in the Karachay-Cherkess Republic and has administrative jurisdiction over one town (Ust-Dzheguta) and nine rural localities. As a municipal division, the district is incorporated as Ust-Dzhegutinsky Municipal District. The town of Ust-Dzheguta is incorporated into an urban settlement, while the nine rural localities are incorporated into seven rural settlements within the municipal district. The town of Ust-Dzheguta serves as the administrative center of both the administrative and municipal district.

Historical population
Year	Pop.	±%
1979	37,699	—
1989	46,136	+22.4%
2002	52,196	+13.1%
2010	50,641	−3.0%
2021	50,736	+0.2%
Source: Census data
