= Elbrussky (urban-type settlement) =

Elbrussky Эльбрусский
- Urban-type settlement
- Interactive map of Elbrussky
- Location of Elbrussky Elbrussky (Karachay-Cherkessia)
- Coordinates: 43°34′N 42°09′E
- Country: Russia
- Federal subject: Karachay-Cherkessia
- Founded: 1891
- Urban-type settlement status since: 1953
- Elevation: 1,180 m (3,870 ft)

Population (2010 Census)
  - Total: 320
  - Estimate (2025): 301 (−5.9%)

Administrative status
  - Subordinated to: town of republic significance of Karachayevsk

Municipal status
  - Urban okrug: Karachayevsky Urban Okrug
- Time zone: UTC+3 (MSK)
- Postal code: 369238
- OKTMO ID: 91705000066

Elbrussky population
- 2010 Census: 320
- 2002 Census: 242
- 1989 Census: 328
- 1979 Census: 386

Elbrussky (Russian: Эльбру́сский) is an urban locality (an urban-type settlement) under the administrative jurisdiction of the town of republic significance of Karachayevsk in the Karachay-Cherkess Republic, Russia. As of the 2010 Census, its population was 320.

== History ==
Urban-type settlement status was granted to Elbrussky in 1953.

== Administrative and municipal status ==
Within the framework of administrative divisions, the urban-type settlement of Elbrussky is subordinated to the town of republic significance of Karachayevsk. Within the framework of municipal divisions, Elbrussky is a part of Karachayevsky Urban Okrug.
