= Ordzhonikidze =

Ordzhonikidze was the surname of Soviet political leader Grigoriy Ordzhonikidze, after whom several places in the USSR were named.

Ordzhonikidze may refer to:

== People ==
- Ordzhonikidze (surname)

== Places ==
=== Armenia ===
- Vahan, Armenia, formerly, Ordzhonikidze, a town

=== Azerbaijan ===
- Orconikidze, Beylagan, Azerbaijan, formerly Ordzhonikidze, a village
- Nərimankənd, Gadabay, Azerbaijan, also known as Ordzhonikidze, a village and municipality
- Orconikidze, Shaki, Azerbaijan, also called Ordzhonikidze, a village

=== Russia ===
- Ordzhonikidze, former name of the city of Vladikavkaz, the capital of North Ossetia-Alania

=== Kazakhstan ===
- former name of the village of Denisovka, Kazakhstan

=== Ukraine ===
- former name of the city of Yenakiieve, Ukraine, from 1937 to 1943 (as Ordzhonikidze, Stalino Oblast)
- former name of the city of Pokrov, Ukraine
- Ordzhonikidze, Crimea, an urban settlement of Feodosiya, Crimea (since the 2014 Russian annexation of Crimea fully controlled by Russia)

=== Georgia ===
- Bambora, formerly Ordzhonikidze, a village in the Gudauta District of Abkhazia (status of Abkhazia is disputed)

== Other uses ==
- Ordzhonikidze, a Sverdlov-class cruiser
- Ordzhonikidze Yard, another name for Baltic Shipyard in Leningrad

== See also ==
- Ordzhonikidzevsky (disambiguation)
