= Urupsky District =

Urupsky District Урупский район (Russian)
- District

Other transcription(s)
  - Karachay-Balkar: Уруп район
  - Kabardian: Уэрп къедзыгъуэ
  - Abaza: Уарп район
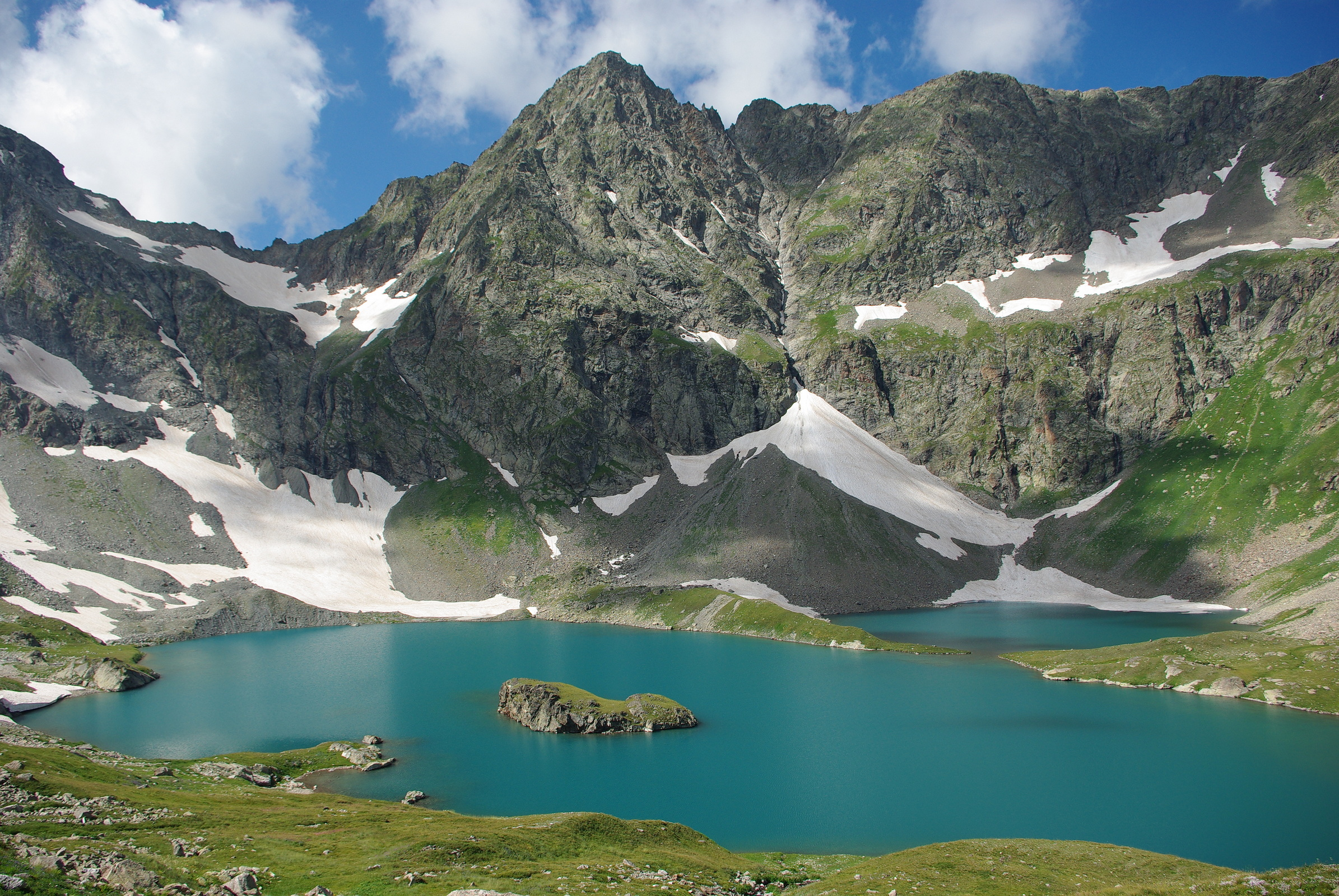
- Lake Bezmolviya, a protected area of Russia in Urupsky District
- Location of Urupsky District in the Karachay-Cherkess Republic
- Coordinates: 43°57′N 41°11′E
- Country: Russia
- Federal subject: Karachay-Cherkess Republic
- Established: 1938
- Administrative center: Pregradnaya

Area
  - Total: 2,782 km^{2} (1,074 sq mi)

Population (2010 Census)
  - Total: 24,404
  - Density: 8.772/km^{2} (22.72/sq mi)
  - Urban: 24.4%
  - Rural: 75.6%

Administrative structure
  - Inhabited localities: 1 urban-type settlements, 15 rural localities

Municipal structure
  - Municipally incorporated as: Urupsky Municipal District
  - Municipal divisions: 1 urban settlements, 6 rural settlements
- Time zone: UTC+3 (MSK)
- OKTMO ID: 91630000
- Website: http://urupadm.ru

Population of Urupsky District
- 2010 Census: 24,404
- 2002 Census: 18,654
- 1989 Census: 21,824
- 1979 Census: 22,213

Urupsky District (Russian: Уру́пский райо́н; Karachay-Balkar: Уруп район, Urup rayon; Kabardian: Уэрп къедзыгъуэ; Abaza: Уарп район) is an administrative and a municipal district (raion), one of the ten in the Karachay-Cherkess Republic, Russia. It is located in the west of the republic. The area of the district is 2,782 square kilometers (1,074 sq mi). Its administrative center is the rural locality (a stanitsa) of Pregradnaya. As of the 2010 Census, the total population of the district was 24,404, with the population of Pregradnaya accounting for 30.6% of that number.

== Administrative and municipal status ==
Within the framework of administrative divisions, Urupsky District is one of the ten in the Karachay-Cherkess Republic and has administrative jurisdiction over one urban-type settlement (Mednogorsky) and fifteen rural localities. As a municipal division, the district is incorporated as Urupsky Municipal District. The urban-type settlement of Mednogorsky is incorporated into an urban settlement, while the fifteen rural localities are incorporated into six rural settlements within the municipal district. The stanitsa of Pregradnaya serves as the administrative center of both the administrative and municipal district.
