= Pregradnaya =

Rural locality in Karachay-Cherkessia, Russia

Coordinates: 43°57′07″N 41°11′30″E

Pregradnaya (Russian: Преградная, Karachay-Balkar: Преградна) is a rural locality (a stanitsa) and the administrative center of Urupsky District of the Karachay-Cherkess Republic, Russia. Population: 7,466 (2010 census); 6,566 (2002 census); 6,853 (1989 Soviet census).
