= Ust-Dzheguta =

Town in the Karachay-Cherkess Republic, Russia

Ust-Dzheguta Усть-Джегута
- Town

Other transcription(s)
  - Karachay-Balkar: Джёгетей Аягъы
  - Abaz: Усть-Джьгваты
  - aKabardian: Жэгуэтэныпэ
- Interactive map of Ust-Dzheguta
- Location of Ust-Dzheguta Ust-Dzheguta (Karachay-Cherkessia)
- Coordinates: 44°05′14″N 41°58′24″E
- Country: Russia
- Federal subject: Karachay-Cherkessia
- Administrative district: Ust-Dzhegutinsky District
- 1861
- Town status since: 1975
- Elevation: 620 m (2,030 ft)

Population (2010 Census)
  - Total: 30,566
  - Estimate (2025): 31,685 (+3.7%)

Administrative status
  - Capital of: Ust-Dzhegutinsky District

Municipal status
  - Municipal district: Ust-Dzhegutinsky Municipal District
  - Urban settlement: Ust-Dzhegutinskoye Urban Settlement
  - Capital of: Ust-Dzhegutinsky Municipal District, Ust-Dzhegutinskoye Urban Settlement
- Time zone: UTC+3 (MSK)
- Postal code: 369300
- OKTMO ID: 91635101001
- Website: u-dzheguta.ru

Ust-Dzheguta (Russian: Усть-Джегута; Karachay-Balkar: Джёгетей Аягъы, Cögetey Ayağı; Abaza: Усть-Джьгваты; Kabardian: Жэгуэтэныпэ) is a town and the administrative center of Ust-Dzhegutinsky District of the Karachay–Cherkess Republic, Russia, located north of the Caucasus Mountains on the right bank of the Kuban River 15 kilometers (9.3 mi) south of Cherkessk. Population: 31,137 (2021 census); The dam here is the start of the Great Stavropol Canal.

== History ==
It was founded in 1861 as the stanitsa of Dzhegutinskaya (Джегутинская) by the Cossacks. Town status was granted to it in 1975.

== Administrative and municipal status ==
Within the framework of administrative divisions, Ust-Dzheguta serves as the administrative center of Ust-Dzhegutinsky District, of which it is a part. As a municipal division, the town of Ust-Dzheguta is incorporated within Ust-Dzhegutinsky Municipal District as Ust-Dzhegutinskoye Urban Settlement.

== Demographics ==
Population: 31,137 (2021 census); 30,566 (2010 census); 32,903 (2002 census); 29,225 (1989 Soviet census).

Historical population
Year	Pop.	±%
1939	6,398	—
1959	11,490	+79.6%
1970	16,670	+45.1%
1979	19,231	+15.4%
1989	29,225	+52.0%
2002	32,903	+12.6%
2010	30,566	−7.1%
2021	31,137	+1.9%
Source: Census data

=== Ethnic composition ===
As of the 2021 Census, the ethnic distribution of the population was:

- Karachays: 58.9%
- Russians: 30.3%
- Abazins: 5.0%
- Cherkess: 2.0%
- Other ethnicities: 3.8%

== Notable people ==
Russian singer Dima Bilan was born here.
