= Novy Karachay =

Novy Karachay Новый Карачай
- Settlement

Other transcription(s)
  - Karachay-Balkar: Джангы Къарачай
- Interactive map of Novy Karachay
- Location of Novy Karachay Novy Karachay (Karachay-Cherkessia)
- Coordinates: 43°49′N 41°54′E
- Country: Russia
- Federal subject: Karachay-Cherkessia
- Administrative district: Karachayevsky District
- Founded: 1909
- Urban-type settlement status since: 1958

Population (2010 Census)
  - Total: 3,035
  - Estimate (2025): 3,191 (+5.1%)

Municipal status
  - Municipal district: Karachayevsky Municipal District
  - Urban settlement: Novo-Karachayevskoye Urban Settlement
  - Capital of: Novo-Karachayevskoye Urban Settlement
- Time zone: UTC+3 (MSK)
- Postal code: 369228
- OKTMO ID: 91615154051

Novy Karachay population
- 2010 Census: 3,035
- 2002 Census: 2,163
- 1989 Census: 2,138
- 1979 Census: 2,135

Novy Karachay (Russian: Но́вый Карача́й; Karachay-Balkar: Джангы Къарачай, Cangı Qaraçay) is an urban locality (a settlement) in Karachayevsky District of the Karachay-Cherkess Republic, Russia. As of the 2010 Census, its population was 3,035.

== History ==
It was established in 1909 and was originally called Vorontsovo-Karachayevsky (Воронцово-Карачаевский). Urban-type settlement status was granted to it in 1958.

== Administrative and municipal status ==
Within the framework of administrative divisions, the settlement of Novy Karachay is subordinated to Karachayevsky District. As a municipal division, Novy Karachay is incorporated within Karachayevsky Municipal District as Novo-Karachayevskoye Urban Settlement.
