= Ordzhonikidzevsky (urban-type settlement) =

Ordzhonikidzevsky Орджоникидзевский
- Urban-type settlement
- Interactive map of Ordzhonikidzevsky
- Location of Ordzhonikidzevsky Ordzhonikidzevsky (Karachay-Cherkessia)
- Coordinates: 43°50′N 41°54′E
- Country: Russia
- Federal subject: Karachay-Cherkessia
- Urban-type settlement status since: 1938
- Elevation: 819 m (2,687 ft)

Population (2010 Census)
  - Total: 3,039
  - Estimate (2025): 2,923 (−3.8%)

Administrative status
  - Subordinated to: town of republic significance of Karachayevsk

Municipal status
  - Urban okrug: Karachayevsky Urban Okrug
- Time zone: UTC+3 (MSK)
- Postal code: 369221
- OKTMO ID: 91705000061

Ordzhonikidzevsky population
- 2010 Census: 3,039
- 2002 Census: 3,232
- 1989 Census: 3,128
- 1979 Census: 3,340

Ordzhonikidzevsky (Russian: Орджоникидзевский) is an urban locality (an urban-type settlement) under the administrative jurisdiction of the town of republic significance of Karachayevsk in the Karachay-Cherkess Republic, Russia. As of the 2010 Census, its population was 3,039.

== History ==
The town of Elbrussky was granted the urban-type settlement status in 1938. The town was renamed after Soviet political leader Grigoriy Ordzhonikidze.

== Administrative and municipal status ==
Within the framework of administrative divisions, the urban-type settlement of Ordzhonikidzevsky is subordinated to the town of republic significance of Karachayevsk. Within the framework of municipal divisions, Ordzhonikidzevsky is a part of Karachayevsky Urban Okrug.
