= Teberda Nature Reserve =

Nature reserve in Karachay-Cherkessia, Russia

- Russian: Тебердинский заповедник (Also: Teberdinsky)
- IUCN category Ia (strict nature reserve)

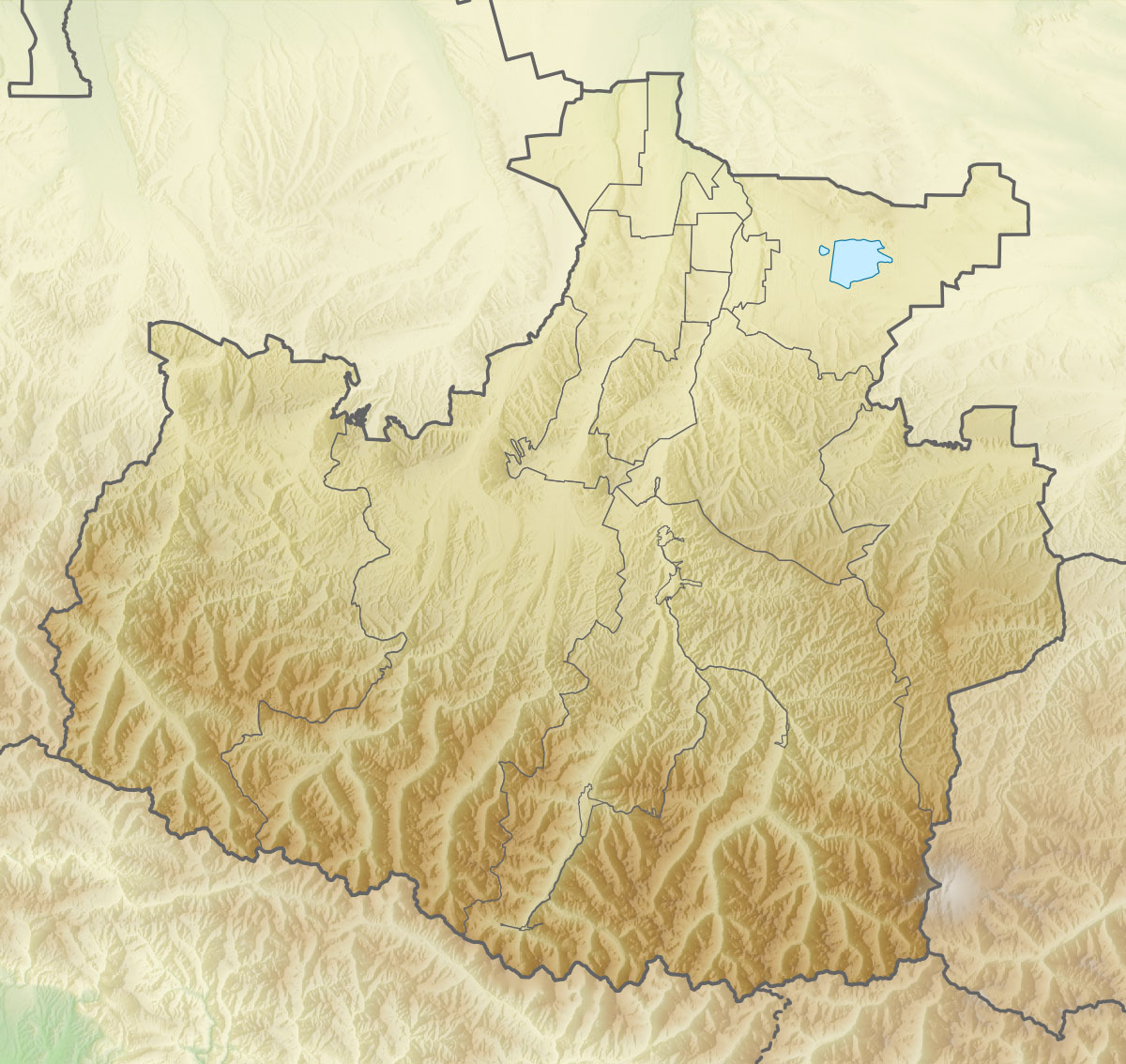
- Location within Karachay-Cherkessia Location within European Russia Location within Caucasus Mountains
- Location: Karachay-Cherkess Republic
- Nearest city: Teberda
- Coordinates: 43°21′0″N 41°42′0″E
- Area: 84,996 hectares (210,030 acres; 328 sq mi)
- Established: 1936
- Governing body: Ministry of Natural Resources and Environment (Russia)
- Website: http://teberda.org.ru/

Teberda Nature Reserve (Russian: Тебердинский) (also Teberdinsky) is a Russian 'zapovednik' (strict ecological reserve) located on the northern slopes of the western section of the Caucasus Mountains. It is the most visited nature reserve in the Russian Federation, with over 200,000 recorded in 2010. Included in the reserve are a popular tourist complex ("Dombay") and resorts in the surrounding areas. The terrain show extremes in variation: 31.7% forests, 20% meadows, 8.5% glaciers, 38.4% rock and scree, 0.7% water (there are 157 lakes and 109 glaciers). The reserve is divided into two sections - the Tebardinsky (65,792 hectares (162,580 acres)) to the east, and the Arkhyz (19,272 hectares (47,620 acres)) to the west. The two sections were connected in 2010 by a "biosphere polygon", the Caucasus State Nature Reserve. The two sectors are situated in the Karachayevsky District of the Karachay-Cherkess Republic. It is part of a UNESCO World Biosphere Reserve. The reserve was created in 1936, and covers an area of 84,996 ha (328.17 sq mi).

== Topography ==
The Teberda Reserve's southern border runs along the Main Caucasus ridge from the peak "Klukhori" to the peak "Herzog". The eastern section, Tebardinsky, covers the headwaters of the Tebarda River. The western section, Arkhyz, is the valley of the Kyzgych River. The altitude varies between 1,260 and 4,047 meters above sea level. The highest peaks in the area are Dombay-Ulgen (4042 m), Boo-Ulgen (3915 meters), Dzhalovchat (3870 meters), and Bela Kaya (3861 meters). The mountains were formed by tectonic forces, and the longitudinal valleys carved by two main periods of glaciation, one in the Jurassic, and the other the more recent.

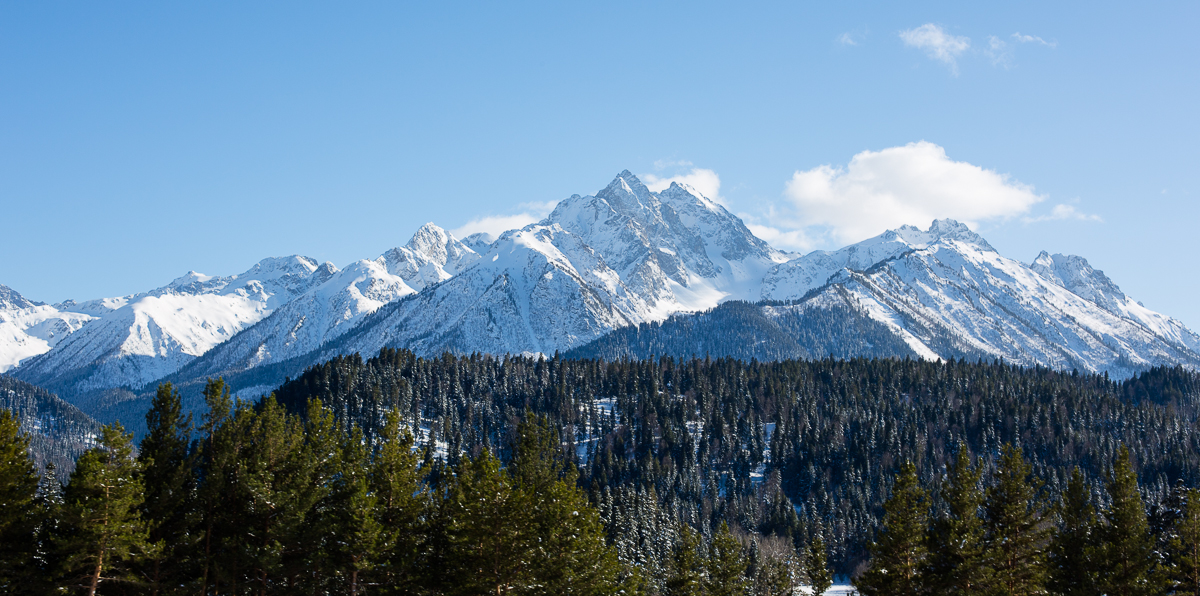
Mount Dombay

There are 109 glaciers, with a total area of 74.3 km2, and extensive snowfields on the mountains. Feeding streams on steep slopes, the glaciers form powerful rapids and waterfalls. There are 157 lakes are concentrated on the territory, with a maximum depth of 30–50 meters, and most above an altitude of 2,000 meters.

== Climate and Ecoregion ==
Teberda is located in the Caucasus mixed forests ecoregion. Located along the Caucasus Mountains between the Black Sea and the Caspian Sea. One of the highest levels of species endemism and diversity in the world: 23% of vascular species, and 10% of vertebrates.

The climate of Teberda is Humid continental climate, cool summer (Köppen climate classification (Dfc)). This climate is characterised by long cold winters, and short, cool summers. The average temperature in January is 2.9 °C, and in July is +15.5 °C. The average frost-free period is 126 days. Snow cover lasts from 21 to 122 days, an average of 73 days. As altitude increases, precipitation increases, and the temperature drops an average of 0.5 °C per 100 meters of ascent.

== Flora and fauna ==
Strong altitude zoning drives the plants in the reserve, with five levels (in ascending order): forest, sub-alpine (2,000 - 2,500 meters), alpine (2,500 - 3,000 meters), sub-nival, and nival (snow). The forest zone (34%) is dominated by pine, with an under story of juniper and rhododendron. The southern areas of the reserve are coniferous forest, and the lower floodplains of the Teberda River feature stands of alder. The alpine zones are alpine heath and meadow. There are 46 species of mammals living on the territory, with 1,300-1,600 of the Caucasian ibex, which have large saber horns reaching 1 meter in length on old males. Bison have been reintroduced into the area after being exterminated in 1926; the reserve's wild bison numbered 32 as of 2015. Recently, the jackal has penetrated the territory and is now the most common predator.

There are three fishes in the streams of the reserve: brown trout, common minnow and European loach. Teberda is an important bird area, with 226 species recorded. The near-threatened Caucasian black grouse is a resident of the reserve, and endemic to the Caucasus.

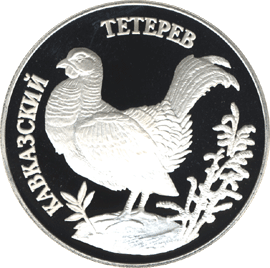
Caucasian black grouse, a resident of the Teberda Reserve. 1-Ruble silver coin, Russia, 1995

== Ecotourism ==
Much of the Teberda Reserve is a strictly protected nature zone, closed to the general public. There are many 'ecotourist' routes in the reserve, however, that are open to the public, with permits available for purchase the reserve offices or at the trail head of Dombay. There is an extensive tourist infrastructure on the entrance to the reserve, including hotels, restaurants, and conference facilities.

== See also ==
- List of Russian Nature Reserves (class 1a 'zapovedniks')
- National parks of Russia
- Protected areas of Russia
- Main Caucasian Range
