= Uchkeken =

Village in Malokarachayevsky District, Russia

Coordinates: 43°56′N 42°31′E

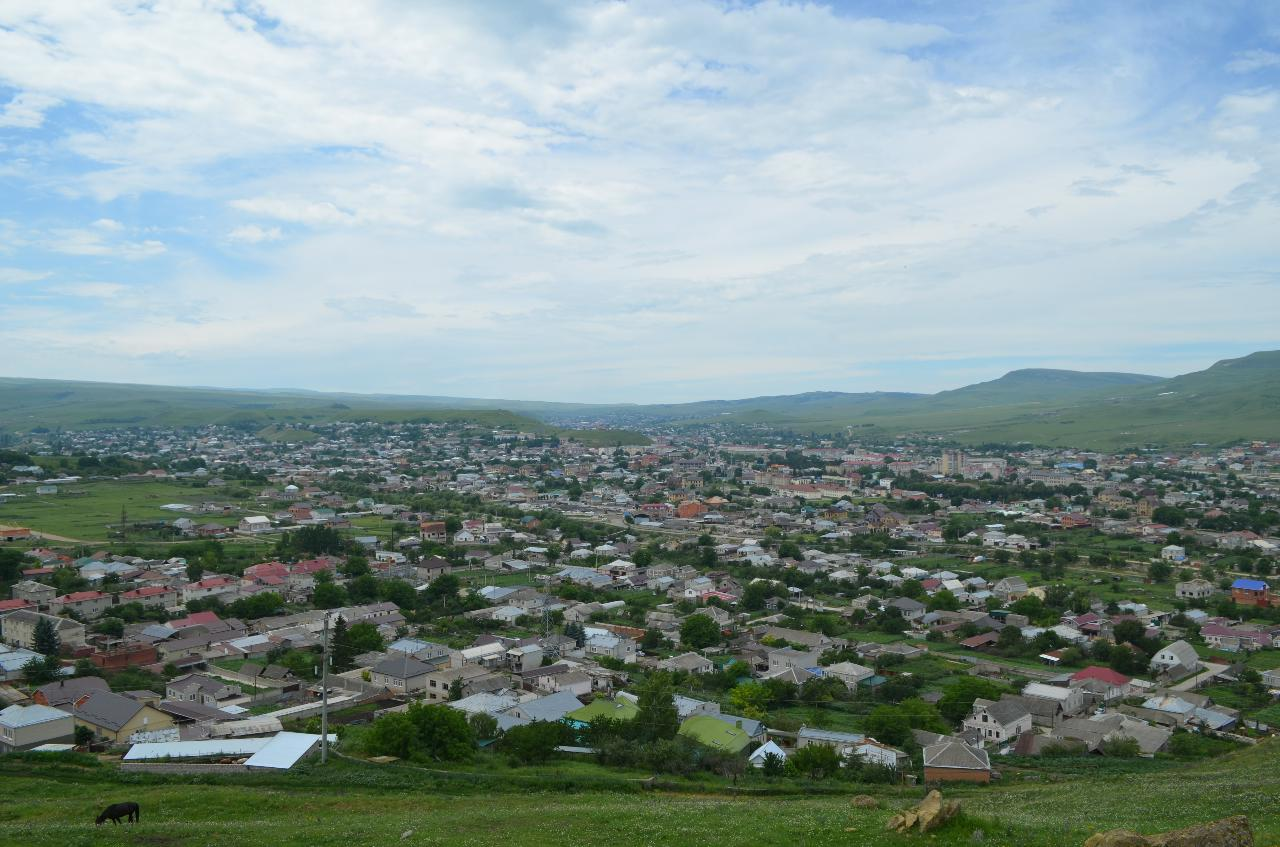
Uchkeken

Uchkeken (Russian: Учкекен; Karachay-Balkar: Ючкёкен, romanized: Üçköken, lit. 'three bushes') is a rural locality (a selo) and the administrative center of Malokarachayevsky District in the Karachay-Cherkess Republic, Russia. Population: 16,512 (2010 census); 15,052 (2002 census); 13,872 (1989 Soviet census).

== Demographics ==
In 2002, the main ethnic groups were:

- Karachays: 91.6%
- Russians: 3.9%

=== Notable people ===
Zuhra Bayramkulova - Hero of Socialist Labour has a street named after her in Uchkeken.
