= Malokarachayevsky District =

Malokarachayevsky District Малокарачаевский район (Russian)
- District

Other transcription(s)
  - Karachay-Balkar: Гитче Къарачай район
  - Abaza: Къарчачкӏвын район
  - kbd: Мало-Къэрэшей район / Мало-Къэрэшей куей
  - nog: Кишкей-Карашай район
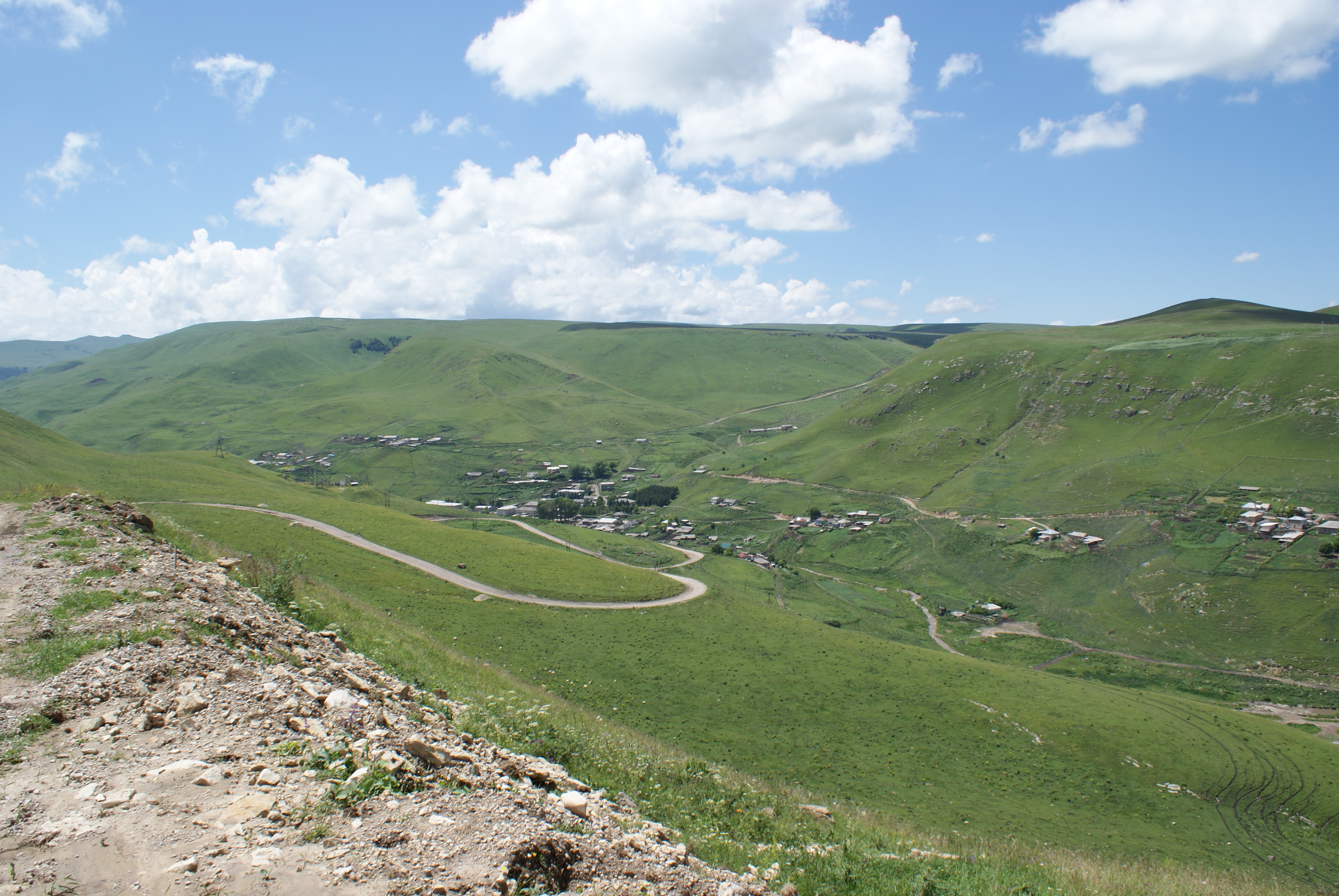
- The selo of Kichi-Balyk in Malokarachayevsky District

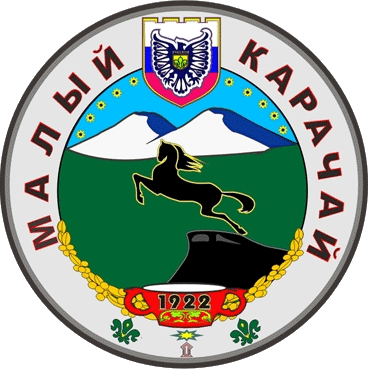
- Coat of arms
- Location of Malokarachayevsky District in the Karachay-Cherkess Republic
- Coordinates: 43°57′N 42°31′E
- Country: Russia
- Federal subject: Karachay-Cherkess Republic
- Established: 1922
- Administrative center: Uchkeken

Area
  - Total: 1,366 km^{2} (527 sq mi)

Population (2010 Census)
  - Total: 43,318
  - Density: 31.71/km^{2} (82.13/sq mi)
  - Urban: 0%
  - Rural: 100%

Administrative structure
  - Inhabited localities: 14 rural localities

Municipal structure
  - Municipally incorporated as: Malokarachayevsky Municipal District
  - Municipal divisions: 0 urban settlements, 10 rural settlements
- Time zone: UTC+3 (MSK)
- OKTMO ID: 91620000
- Website: http://mkarachay.ru/

Population of Malokarachayevsky District
- 2010 Census: 43,318
- 2002 Census: 39,456
- 1989 Census: 36,860
- 1979 Census: 31,790

Malokarachayevsky District (Russian: Малокарача́евский райо́н; Karachay-Balkar: Гитче Къарачай район, romanized: Gitçe Qaraçay rayon; Abaza: Къарчачкӏвын район; Kabardian: Мало-Къэрэшей район / Мало-Къэрэшей куей; Nogai: Кишкей-Карашай район, romanized: Kişkey-Qaraşay rayon) is an administrative and a municipal district (raion), one of the ten in the Karachay-Cherkess Republic, Russia. It is located in the east of the republic. The area of the district is 1,366 square kilometers (527 sq mi). Its administrative center is the rural locality (a selo) of Uchkeken. As of the 2010 Census, the total population of the district was 43,318, with the population of Uchkeken accounting for 38.1% of that number.

== Administrative and municipal status ==
Within the framework of administrative divisions, Malokarachayevsky District is one of the ten in the Karachay-Cherkess Republic and has administrative jurisdiction over all of its fourteen rural localities. As a municipal division, the district is incorporated as Malokarachayevsky Municipal District. Its fourteen rural localities are incorporated into ten rural settlements within the municipal district. The selo of Uchkeken serves as the administrative center of both the administrative and municipal district.
