= Teberda =

Town in the Karachay-Cherkess Republic, Russia

Teberda Теберда́ Теберди (Karachay-Balkar)
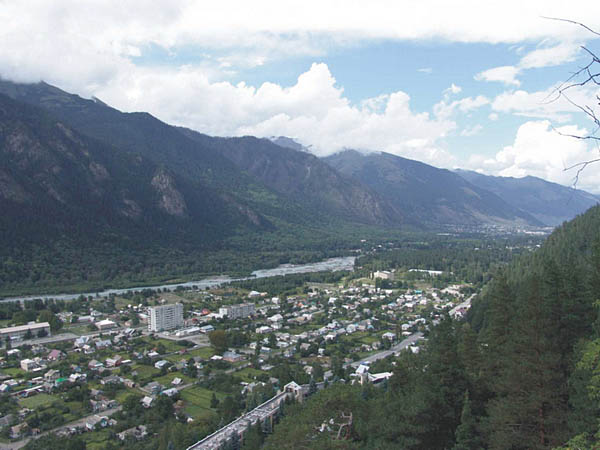
- View of Teberda
- Interactive map of Teberda
- Location of Teberda Teberda (Karachay-Cherkessia)
- Coordinates: 43°26′38″N 41°44′43″E
- Country: Russia
- Federal subject: Karachay-Cherkessia
- Founded: 1868
- Elevation: 1,280 m (4,200 ft)

Population
  - Estimate (2025): 8,963 )
- Time zone: UTC+3 (MSK)
- Postal code: 369210–369214
- OKTMO ID: 91705000006

Teberda (Russian: Теберда́, Karachay-Balkar: Теберди, Teberdi) is a town under the administrative jurisdiction of the town of republic significance of Karachayevsk in the Karachay–Cherkess Republic, Russia, located in the Caucasus Mountains 105 kilometers (65 mi) south of Cherkessk at the elevation of about 1,280 meters (4,200 ft). Population: 9,058 (2010 census); 7,827 (2002 census); 8,840 (1989 Soviet census). The Teberda River flows through the town. It is the gateway to the Teberda Nature Reserve, an area is known for its natural environment and hiking trails.

== History ==
It was founded in 1868 as a Karachay settlement, and was originally called Baychoralany-Kyabak. According to the 1926 census, it had a population of 909, 80.1% Karachay and 8.9% Russian.

During World War II, in 1942, hundreds of local Jews were murdered in mass executions perpetrated by Germans.

From 1944 till 1957 Teberda was part of Georgian Soviet Socialist Republic. Town status was granted in 1971.

== Demographics ==
In 2002, the population included:

- Karachays (64.0%)
- Russians (29.1%)
- Ossetians (1.1%)
- all other ethnicities comprising less than 1% of population each.
