= Abazinsky District =

Abazinsky District Абазинский район (Russian)
- District

Other transcription(s)
  - Abaza: Абаза район
  - Karachay-Balkar: Абаза район
  - Kabardian: Абазэ куей
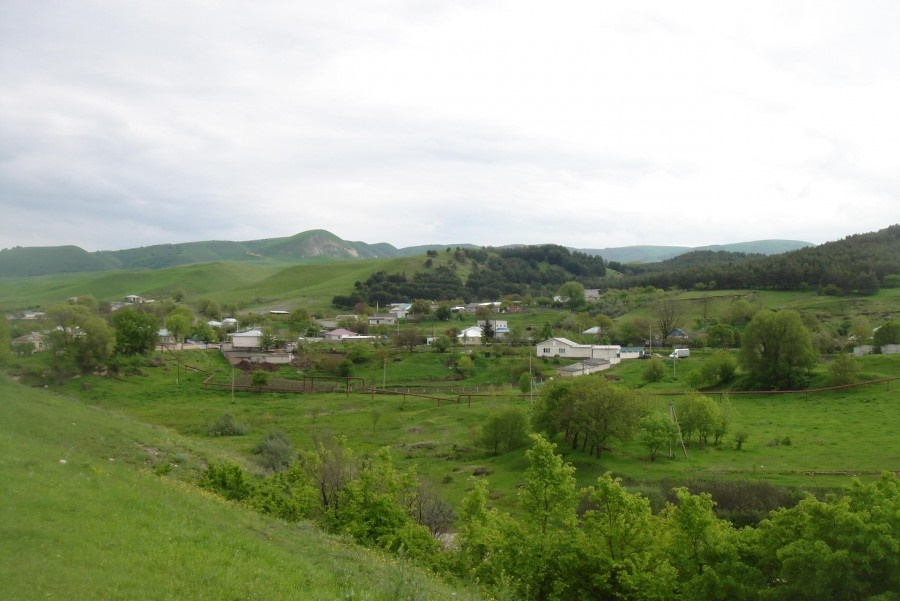
- Rural landscape, Abazinsky District

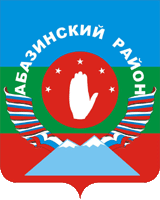
- Flag Coat of arms
- Location of Abazinsky District in the Karachay-Cherkess Republic
- Coordinates: 44°00′N 42°00′E
- Country: Russia
- Federal subject: Karachay-Cherkess Republic
- Established: 2006
- Administrative center: Inzhich-Chukun

Area
  - Total: 300 km^{2} (120 sq mi)

Population (2010 Census)
  - Total: 17,069
  - Density: 57/km^{2} (150/sq mi)
  - Urban: 0%
  - Rural: 100%

Administrative structure
  - Inhabited localities: 5 rural localities

Municipal structure
  - Municipally incorporated as: Abazinsky Municipal District
  - Municipal divisions: 0 urban settlements, 5 rural settlements
- Time zone: UTC+3 (MSK)
- OKTMO ID: 91601000
- Website: http://www.abaza-raion.ru

Abazinsky District (Russian: Абази́нский райо́н; Abaza: Абаза район; Karachay-Balkar: Абаза район; Kabardian: Абазэ куей) is an administrative and municipal district (raion), one of the ten in the Karachay-Cherkess Republic, Russia. It is located in the north of the republic. The area of the district is 300 square kilometers (120 sq mi). Its administrative center is the rural locality (an aul) of Inzhich-Chukun. As of the 2010 Census, the total population of the district was 17,069, with the population of Inzhich-Chukun accounting for 15.2% of that number.

== History ==
The district was established in 2006.

== Administrative and municipal status ==
Within the framework of administrative divisions, Abazinsky District is one of the ten in the Karachay-Cherkess Republic and has administrative jurisdiction over all of its five rural localities. As a municipal division, the district is incorporated as Abazinsky Municipal District. Its five rural localities are incorporated into five rural settlements within the municipal district. The aul of Inzhich-Chukun serves as the administrative center of both the administrative and municipal district.
