= Dombay, Karachay-Cherkess Republic =

Dombay Домбай
- Resort settlement

Other transcription(s)
  - Karachay-Balkar: Доммай
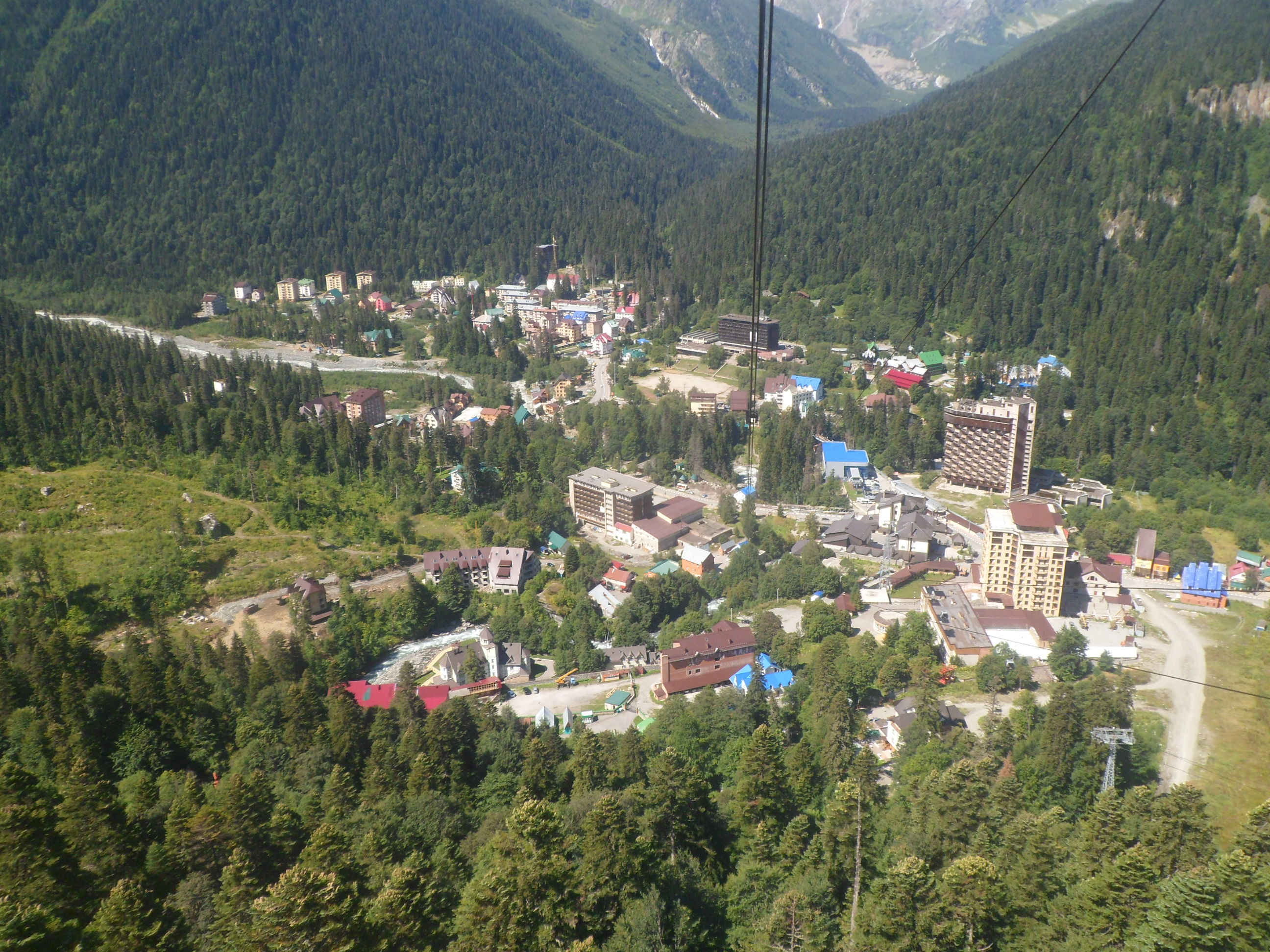
- View of Dombay in summer
- Interactive map of Dombay
- Location of Dombay Dombay (Karachay-Cherkessia)
- Coordinates: 43°18′N 41°38′E
- Country: Russia
- Federal subject: Karachay-Cherkessia
- Urban-type settlement status since: 1965
- Elevation: 1,600 m (5,200 ft)

Population (2010 Census)
  - Total: 657
  - Estimate (2025): 666 (+1.4%)

Administrative status
  - Subordinated to: town of republic significance of Karachayevsk

Municipal status
  - Urban okrug: Karachayevsky Urban Okrug
- Time zone: UTC+3 (MSK)
- Postal code: 369241
- OKTMO ID: 91705000056

Dombay population
- 2010 Census: 657
- 2002 Census: 403
- 1989 Census: 1,601
- 1979 Census: 1,730

Dombay (Russian: Домба́й; Karachay-Balkar: Доммай, Dommay) is an urban locality (a resort settlement) under the administrative jurisdiction of the town of republic significance of Karachayevsk in the Karachay-Cherkess Republic, Russia. As of the 2010 Census, its population was 657.

== Geography ==
Dombay is situated within the Teberda Nature Reserve (zapovednik) and is a tourist destination.

== History ==
Urban-type settlement status was granted to Dombay in 1965.

In January 2013, the ski resort made international headlines when a man died from a broken neck and another was badly injured when a Zorb rolled out of control down a mountain, hitting rocks and eventually coming to a stop 1 kilometer (0.62 mi) away on a frozen lake in Dombay. After the incident made international headlines, Russian authorities called for tougher safety laws.

== Administrative and municipal status ==
Within the framework of administrative divisions, the resort settlement of Dombay is subordinated to the town of republic significance of Karachayevsk. Within the framework of municipal divisions, Dombay is a part of Karachayevsky Urban Okrug.
