= Karachayevsk =

Karachayevsk Карачаевск
- Town

Other transcription(s)
  - Karachay-Balkar: Къарачай шахар
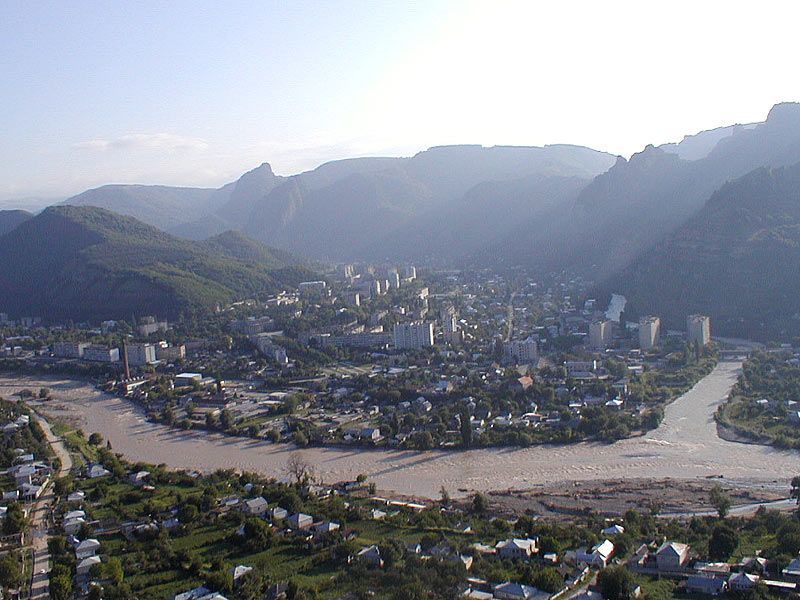
- Confluence of the Teberda and Kuban Rivers in Karachayevsk

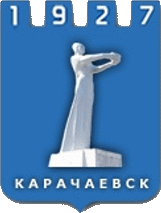
- Coat of arms
- Interactive map of Karachayevsk
- Location of Karachayevsk Karachayevsk (Karachay-Cherkessia)
- Coordinates: 43°46′23″N 41°55′01″E
- Country: Russia
- Federal subject: Karachay-Cherkessia
- Founded: 1929
- Elevation: 900 m (3,000 ft)

Population (2010 Census)
  - Total: 21,483
  - Estimate (2023): 23,728 (+10.5%)

Administrative status
  - Subordinated to: town of republic significance of Karachayevsk
  - Capital of: Karachayevsky District, town of republic significance of Karachayevsk

Municipal status
  - Urban okrug: Karachayevsky Urban Okrug
  - Capital of: Karachayevsky Urban Okrug, Karachayevsky Municipal District
- Time zone: UTC+3 (MSK)
- Postal codes: 369200–369202, 369204
- OKTMO ID: 91705000001
- Website: karachaevsk.info

Karachayevsk (Russian: Карача́евск; Karachay-Balkar: Къарачай шахар, Qaraçay şaxar) is a town in the Karachay-Cherkess Republic, Russia, located on the Kuban River in the Caucasus Mountains. Population: 21,483 (2010 census); 22,113 (2002 census); 21,582 (1989 Soviet census).

== History ==
It was founded in 1926 as Georgiyevskoye settlement and by the resolution of the All-Russian Central Executive Committee of August 26, 1929, the name of Mikoyan-Shahar was approved and the town was given the status of a city. During World War II, from August 1942 to January 1943, the area was occupied by the German forces. From October 5, 1944 to January 1, 1957, when the Karachays were in exile into the Central Asian deserts, by the decision of the Council of People's Commissars of the USSR of November 6, 1943, for alleged collaboration with the Germans, Mikoyan-Shahar was renamed Klukhori and the territory of the former Karachay Autonomous Region was assigned to the Georgian SSR.

The vicinity is rich in early medieval monuments, such as the ruins of the Khumar fortress and the early 10th-century Shoana Church.

== Administrative and municipal status ==
Within the framework of administrative divisions, Karachayevsk serves as the administrative center of Karachayevsky District, even though it is not a part of it. As an administrative division, it is, together with one town (Teberda), three urban-type settlements (Elbrussky, Ordzhonikidzevsky, and the resort settlement of Dombay), and two rural localities (the settlements of Mara-Ayagyy and Malokurganny), incorporated separately as the town of republic significance of Karachayevsk—an administrative unit with the status equal to that of the districts. As a municipal division, the town of republic significance of Karachayevsk is incorporated as Karachayevsky Urban Okrug.

== Demographics ==
In 2002, the population included:

- Karachays (72.7%)
- Russians (16.3%)
- Ossetians (3.0%)
- Cherkess (1.4%)
- Nogays (1.1%)
