= Khabezsky District =

Khabezsky District Хабезский район (Russian)
- District

Other transcription(s)
  - Abaza: Хӏабаз район
  - Nogai: Хабез район
  - Karachay-Balkar: Хабез район
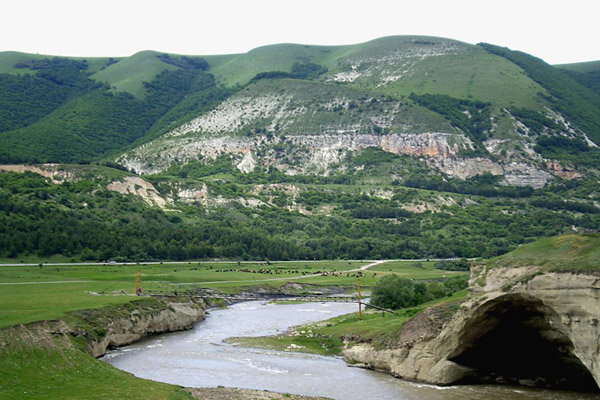
- The Zelenchuk River near the aul of Zeyuko in Khabezsky District

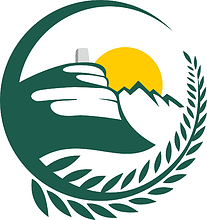
- Coat of arms
- Location of Khabezsky District in the Karachay-Cherkess Republic
- Coordinates: 44°02′N 41°46′E
- Country: Russia
- Federal subject: Karachay-Cherkess Republic
- Administrative center: Khabez

Area
  - Total: 565 km^{2} (218 sq mi)

Population (2010 Census)
  - Total: 30,356
  - Density: 53.7/km^{2} (139/sq mi)
  - Urban: 0%
  - Rural: 100%

Administrative structure
  - Inhabited localities: 13 rural localities

Municipal structure
  - Municipally incorporated as: Khabezsky Municipal District
  - Municipal divisions: 0 urban settlements, 10 rural settlements
- Time zone: UTC+3 (MSK)
- OKTMO ID: 91640000
- Website: http://xabez.ru

Population of Khabezsky District
- 2010 Census: 30,356
- 2002 Census: 31,885
- 1989 Census: 27,108
- 1979 Census: 25,938

Khabezsky District (Russian: Хабе́зский райо́н; Abaza: Хӏабаз район; Kabardian: Хьэбэз къедзыгъуэ; Nogai: Хабез район, romanized: Xabez rayon; Karachay-Balkar: Хабез район, romanized: Xabez rayon) is an administrative and a municipal district (raion), one of the ten in the Karachay-Cherkess Republic, Russia. It is located in the north of the republic. The area of the district is 565 square kilometers (218 sq mi). Its administrative center is the rural locality (an aul) of Khabez. As of the 2010 Census, the total population of the district was 30,356, with the population of Khabez accounting for 20.6% of that number.

== Administrative and municipal status ==
Within the framework of administrative divisions, Khabezsky District is one of the ten in the Karachay-Cherkess Republic and has administrative jurisdiction over all of its thirteen rural localities. As a municipal division, the district is incorporated as Khabezsky Municipal District. Its thirteen rural localities are incorporated into ten rural settlements within the municipal district. The aul of Khabez serves as the administrative center of both the administrative and municipal district.
