= Khabez =

Rural locality in Khabezsky District, Russia

Coordinates: 44°02′N 41°47′E

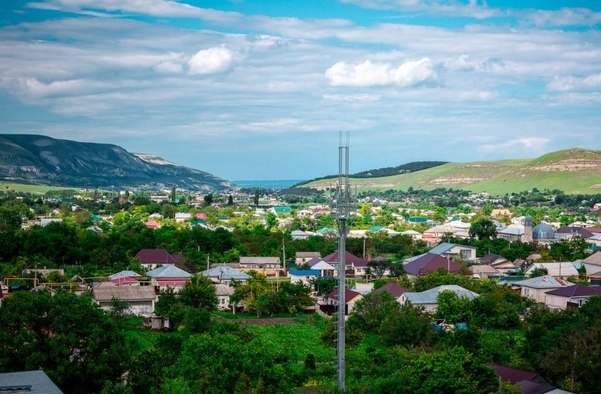
View of the village Khabez

Khabez (Russian: Хабез; Kabardian: Хьэбэз; Abaza: ХӀабаз) is a rural locality (an aul) and the administrative center of Khabezsky District of the Karachay-Cherkess Republic, Russia. Population: 6,240 (2010 census).

== Demographics ==
Population: 6,240 (2010 census); 5,781 (2002 census); 5,308 (1989 Soviet census).

In 2002, the ethnic composition of the population was as follows:

- Abazins (4.1%)
- Russians (1.2%)
- all other ethnicities comprising less than 1% of population each.
