= Karachayevsky District =

Karachayevsky District Карачаевский район (Russian)
- District

Other transcription(s)
  - Karachay-Balkar: Къарачай район
  - Kabardian: Къэрэшей район
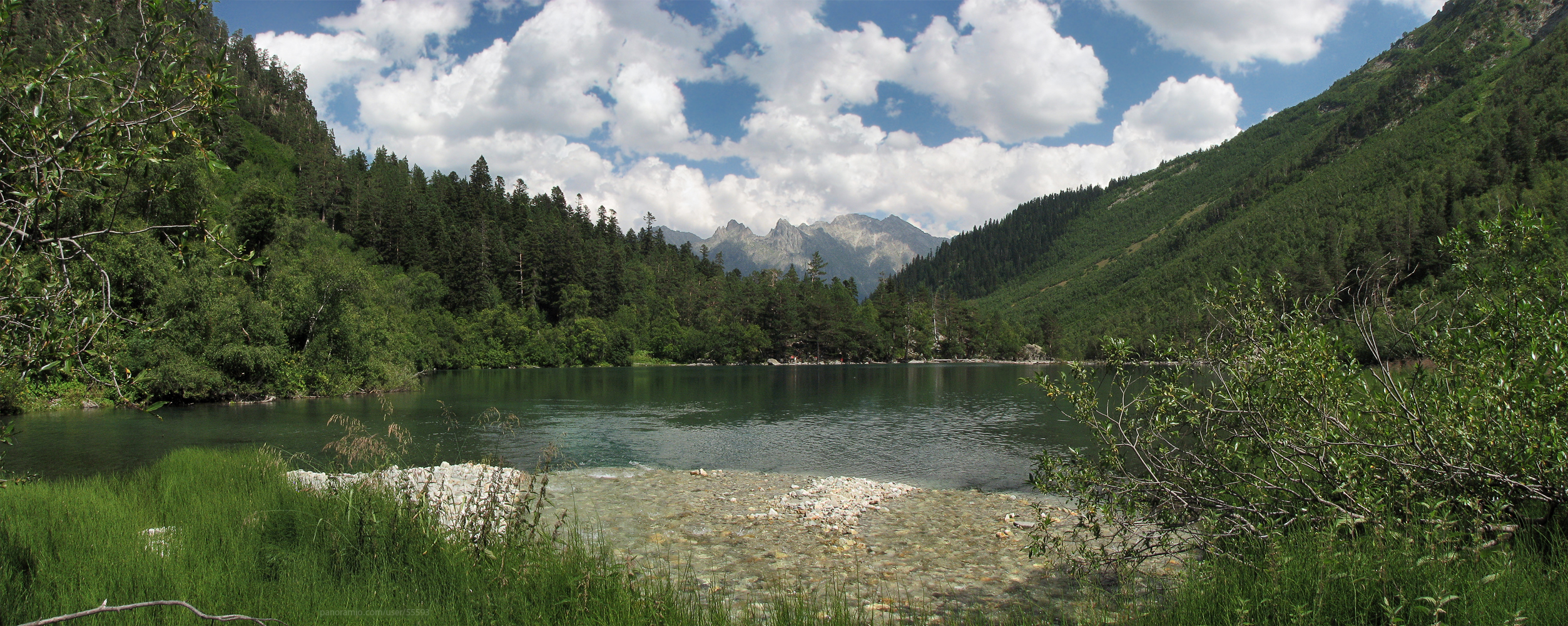
- Lake Tretye Badukskoye in Karachayevsky District

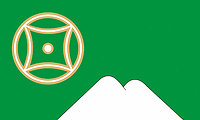
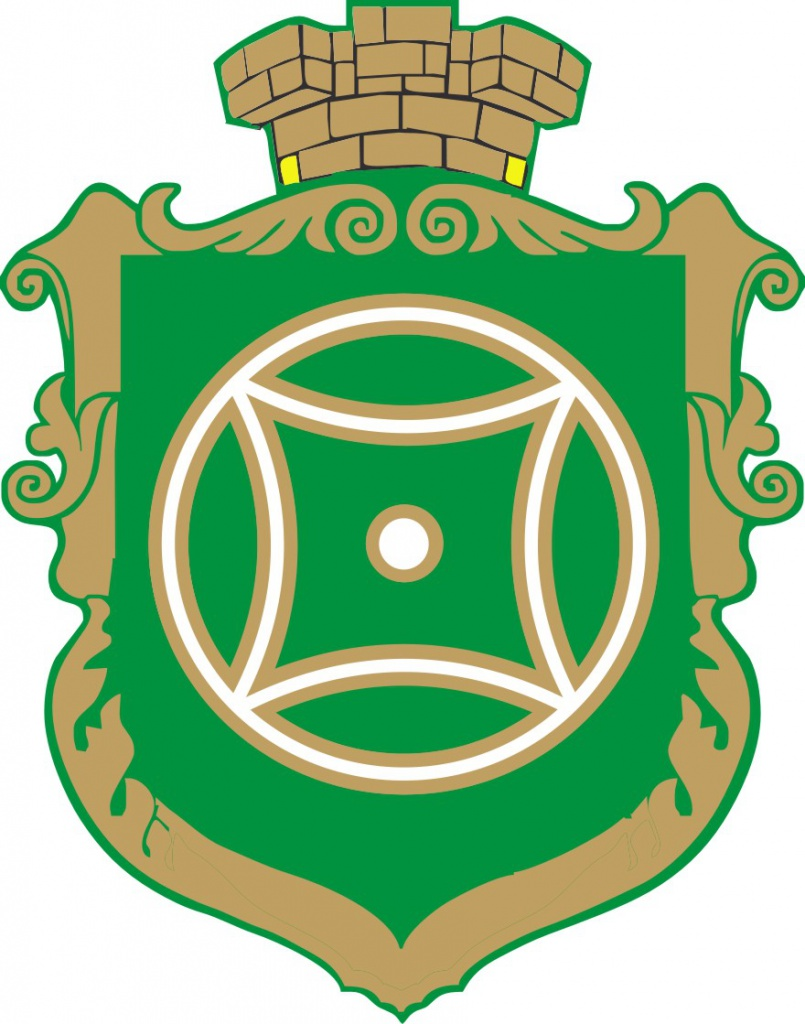
- Flag Coat of arms
- Location of Karachayevsky District in the Karachay-Cherkess Republic
- Coordinates: 43°46′N 41°54′E
- Country: Russia
- Federal subject: Karachay-Cherkess Republic
- Established: 12 January 1957
- Administrative center: Karachayevsk

Area
  - Total: 3,916 km^{2} (1,512 sq mi)

Population (2010 Census)
  - Total: 30,376
  - Density: 7.757/km^{2} (20.09/sq mi)
  - Urban: 20.5%
  - Rural: 79.5%

Administrative structure
  - Inhabited localities: 2 urban-type settlements, 17 rural localities

Municipal structure
  - Municipally incorporated as: Karachayevsky Municipal District
  - Municipal divisions: 2 urban settlements, 13 rural settlements
- Time zone: UTC+3 (MSK)
- OKTMO ID: 91615000
- Website: http://www.карачаевский-район.рф

Population of Karachayevsky District
- 2010 Census: 30,376
- 2002 Census: 26,255
- 1989 Census: 24,895
- 1979 Census: 22,360

Karachayevsky District (Russian: Карача́евский райо́н; Karachay-Balkar: Къарачай район, Qaraçay rayon; Kabardian: Къэрэшей район) is an administrative and a municipal district (raion), one of the ten in the Karachay-Cherkess Republic, Russia. It is located in the central and southern parts of the republic. The area of the district is 3,916 square kilometers (1,512 sq mi). Its administrative center is the town of Karachayevsk (which is not administratively a part of the district). As of 2010 Census, the total population of the district was 30,376.

== Administrative and municipal status ==
Within the framework of administrative divisions, Karachayevsky District is one of the ten in the Karachay-Cherkess Republic and has administrative jurisdiction over two urban-type settlements (Novy Karachay and Pravokubansky) and seventeen rural localities. The town of Karachayevsk serves as its administrative center, despite being incorporated separately as a town of republic significance—an administrative unit with the status equal to that of the districts.

As a municipal division, the district is incorporated as Karachayevsky Municipal District. The two urban-type settlements are incorporated into two urban settlements, while the seventeen rural localities are incorporated into thirteen rural settlements within the municipal district. The town of republic significance of Karachayevsk is incorporated separately from the district as Karachayevsky Urban Okrug, but serves as the administrative center of the municipal district as well.
