= Karachay-Cherkessia constituency =

Russian legislative constituency

Karachay-Cherkessia single-member constituency
- Constituency of the Russian State Duma

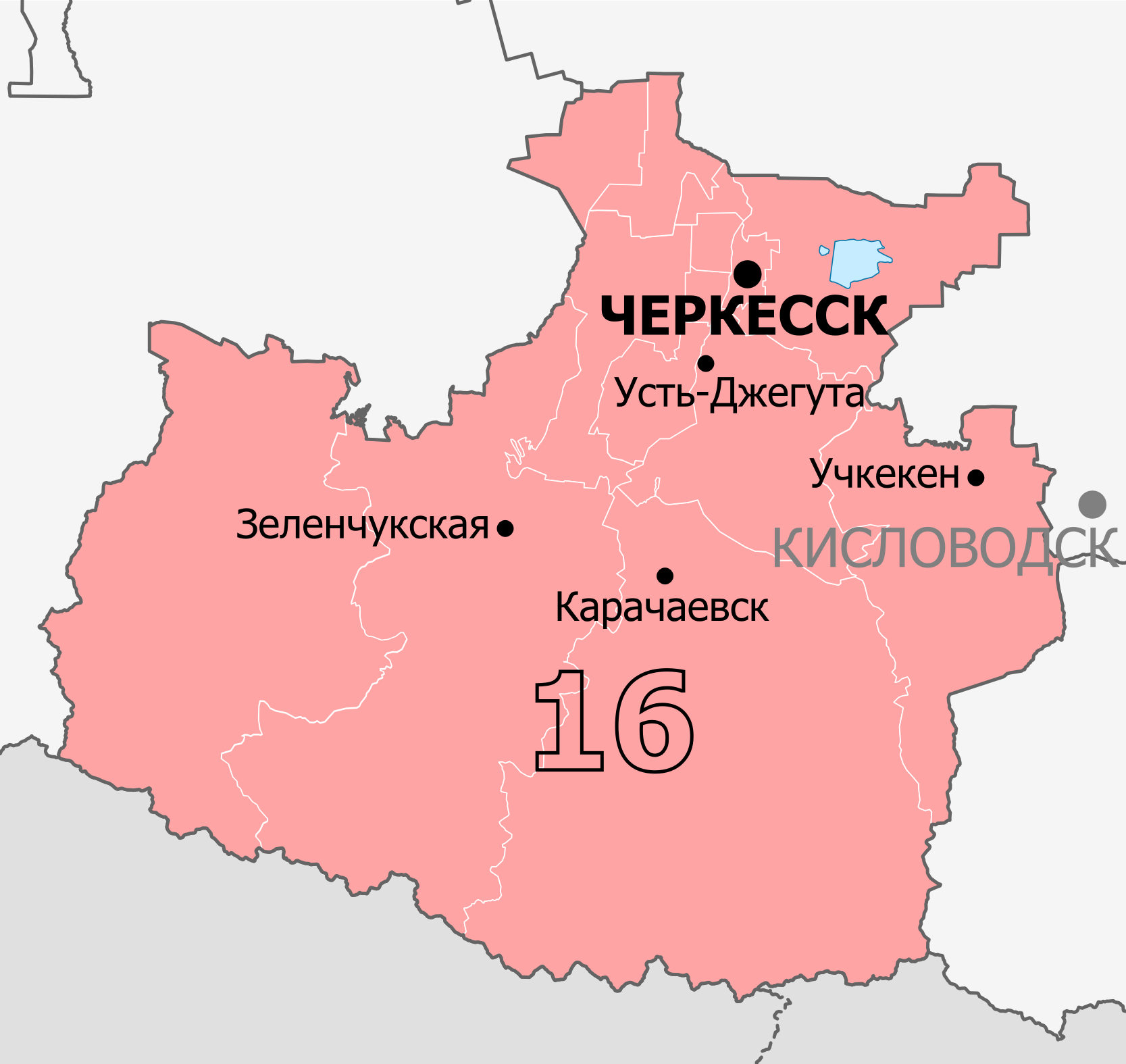
- Deputy: Soltan Uzdenov; United Russia
- Federal subject: Karachay-Cherkess Republic
- Districts: Abazinsky, Adyge-Khablsky, Cherkessk, Karachayevsk, Karachayevsky, Khabezsky, Malokarachayevsky, Nogaysky, Prikubansky, Urupsky, Ust-Dzhegutinsky, Zelenchuksky
- Voters: 298,428 (2026)

The Karachay-Cherkessia constituency (No.19 (Note: No.15 in 1993-2003, No.19 in 2016–2026)) is a Russian legislative constituency in Karachay-Cherkessia. The constituency encompasses the entire territory of Karachay-Cherkessia.

The constituency has been represented since 2023 by United Russia deputy Soltan Uzdenov, a businessman, who succeeded his father Dzhasharbek Uzdenov after his death in April 2023.

== Boundaries ==
1993–2007, 2016–present: Abazinsky District, Adyge-Khablsky District, Cherkessk, Karachayevsk, Karachayevsky District, Khabezsky District, Malokarachayevsky District, Nogaysky District, Prikubansky District, Urupsky District, Ust-Dzhegutinsky District, Zelenchuksky District
The constituency has been covering the entirety of the Karachay-Cherkessia since its initial creation in 1993.

== Members elected ==
Election	Member	Party
1993	Azret Akbayev	Independent
1995	Mikhail Yakush	Communist Party
1999	Boris Berezovsky (Note: resigned in July 2000)	Independent
2000	Magomet Tekeyev	Independent
2003	Nadezhda Maksimova	United Russia
2007	Proportional representation - no election by constituency	
2011	Proportional representation - no election by constituency	
2016	Rasul Botashev	United Russia
2021	Dzhasharbek Uzdenov (Note: died in April 2023)	United Russia
2023	Soltan Uzdenov	United Russia
2026	Soltan Uzdenov	United Russia

== Election results ==
=== 1993 ===
==== Declared candidates ====
- Azret Akbayev (Independent), chairman of the republican culture fund
- Valery Baskayev (BR–NI), Chairman of the Karachayevsk City Committee on Youth
- Boris Ebzeyev (Independent), Judge of the Constitutional Court of Russia (1991–present)
- Umar Khubiyev (Independent), businessman (previously ran as BR–NI candidate)
- Aleksandr Kobanov (Independent), insurance businessman
- Aleksandr Malykhin (Choice of Russia), economist

==== Results ====
Summary of the 12 December 1993 Russian legislative election in the Karachay-Cherkessia constituency
Candidate	Party	Votes	%
Azret Akbayev	Independent	78,774	39.09%
Aleksandr Kobanov	Independent	–	27.30%
Valery Baskayev	Future of Russia–New Names	–	–
Boris Ebzeyev	Independent	–	–
Umar Khubiyev	Independent	–	–
Vladimir Malykhin	Choice of Russia	–	–
Total		201,535	100%

=== 1995 ===
==== Declared candidates ====
- Mussa Abaikhanov (Independent), painter
- Zaur Adzhiyev (FDD), Deputy Head of the State Committee on Antimonopoly Policy Regional Office
- Azret Akbayev (BIR), incumbent Member of State Duma (1994–present)
- Nazir Alakayev (Independent), lecturer
- Ismail Aliyev (Independent), former Member of Supreme Council of Karachay-Cherkessia (1990–1995), electrical engineering associate professor
- Khasan Bayramukov (APR), Member of People's Assembly of the Karachay-Cherkess Republic (1995–present), sovkhoz director
- Magomet Bytdayev (Independent), pensioner
- Alik Chotchayev (PGL), businessman
- Vladimir Davydov (LDPR), coordinator of the party regional office
- Emma Kardanova (Derzhava), chairwoman of the party regional office
- Asiyat Khabicheva (DVR–OD), businesswoman
- Anatoly Khaldzhiyev (Independent), chief doctor of the Karachay-Cherkess republican hospital
- Pilyal Khasanov (Independent), businessman
- Akhmed Kitov (NDR), Karachay-Cherkess State Technological Institute department of management and marketing head, retired Soviet Army colonel
- Aleksandr Kobanov (PPR–ST), insurance businessman, 1993 candidate for this seat
- Aiguf Kubanov (Independent), chairman of the regional lawyers' union
- Pyotr Plesheshnikov (Independent), Mayor of Ust-Dzheguta
- Vladimir Strigin (Independent), Member of Federation Council (1994–present), Chairman of the Zelenchuksky District Court (1988–present)
- Dalkhat Sultanov (Independent), agriculture executive
- Abubakir Tambiyev (Independent), businessman
- Alik Tekeyev (Independent), unemployed
- Alimurat Tekeyev (Independent), chief state sanitary doctor of Karachayevsky District
- Rashid Teunayev (AAR), attorney
- Mikhail Yakush (CPRF), Member of People's Assembly of the Karachay-Cherkess Republic (1995–present)
- Nikolay Zalepukhin (Bloc of Independents), bankruptcy specialist (previously ran as BIR candidate)

==== Withdrawn candidates ====
- Vladimir Dekkushev (Duma-96), businessman
- Bilyal Kubekov (Independent), journalist

==== Results ====
Summary of the 17 December 1995 Russian legislative election in the Karachay-Cherkessia constituency
Candidate	Party	Votes	%
Mikhail Yakush	Communist Party	55,985	31.54%
Akhmed Kitov	Our Home – Russia	25,049	14.11%
Vladimir Strigin	Independent	15,413	8.68%
Emma Kardanova	Derzhava	13,761	7.75%
Ismail Aliyev	Independent	9,160	5.16%
Abubakir Tambiyev	Independent	6,776	3.82%
Vladimir Davydov	Liberal Democratic Party	6,167	3.47%
Aleksandr Kobanov	Trade Unions and Industrialists – Union of Labour	5,488	3.09%
Pyotr Pleshennikov	Independent	5,066	2.85%
Khasan Bayramukov	Agrarian Party	4,728	2.66%
Anatoly Khaldzhiyev	Independent	3,643	2.05%
Rashid Teunayev	Russian Lawyers' Association	2,989	1.68%
Azret Akbayev (incumbent)	Ivan Rybkin Bloc	2,474	1.39%
Nikolay Zalepukhin	Bloc of Independents	2,119	1.19%
Alimurat Tekeyev	Independent	1,897	1.07%
Alik Chotchayev	Pamfilova–Gurov–Lysenko	1,208	0.68%
Dalkhat Sultanov	Independent	1,109	0.62%
Aiguf Kubanov	Independent	1,046	0.59%
Asiyat Khabicheva	Democratic Choice of Russia – United Democrats	1,041	0.59%
Nazir Alakayev	Independent	752	0.42%
Mussa Abaikhanov	Independent	661	0.37%
Pilyal Khasanov	Independent	596	0.34%
Magomet Bytdayev	Independent	466	0.26%
against all		5,549	3.13%
Total		177,478	100%

=== 1999 ===
==== Declared candidates ====
- Boris Berezovsky (Independent), former Deputy Secretary of the Security Council of Russia (1996–1997), billionaire businessman
- Magomed Borlakov (RPP), economist
- Vladimir Davydov (LDPR), aide to State Duma member, 1995 candidate for this seat
- Leonid Kaplin (DN), prorector of South Russian State University of Economics and Service
- Emma Kardanova (OVR), chairwoman of the Fatherland party regional office, 1995 Derzhava candidate for this seat
- Ruslan Kochkarov (Independent), Judge of the Cherkessk City Court (1992–present)
- Yury Krivobokov (NDR), prorector of Karachay-Cherkess State Technological Institute
- Vladimir Malykhin (Yabloko), Member of Cherkessk City Duma, economist, 1993 Choice of Russia candidate for this seat
- Muratkhan Mikhailovich (CPRF), electrical engineer
- Baylyk Shidakov (Independent), condensers plant director
- Ansar Tebuyev (Independent), First Deputy Minister of Internal Affairs of Karachay-Cherkessia (1996–present), militsiya colonel

==== Withdrawn candidates ====
- Viktor Savelyev (RSP), Member of People's Assembly of the Karachay-Cherkess Republic (1995–present), businessman

==== Did not file ====
- Ismail Khachirov (Independent), former People's Deputy of the Soviet Union (1989–1991)

==== Declined ====
- Mikhail Yakush (CPRF), incumbent Member of State Duma (1996–present), 1999 head candidate

==== Results ====
Summary of the 19 December 1999 Russian legislative election in the Karachay-Cherkessia constituency
Candidate	Party	Votes	%
Boris Berezovsky	Independent	79,752	40.95%
Muratkhan Mikhailovich	Communist Party	46,688	23.97%
Ruslan Kochkarov	Independent	12,472	6.40%
Magomed Borlakov	Party of Pensioners	10,475	5.38%
Emma Kardanova	Fatherland – All Russia	9,152	4.70%
Yury Krivobokov	Our Home – Russia	7,669	3.94%
Vladimir Malykhin	Yabloko	6,615	3.40%
Vladimir Davydov	Liberal Democratic Party	4,810	2.47%
Ansar Tebuyev	Independent	1,811	0.93%
Leonid Kaplin	Spiritual Heritage	1,796	0.92%
Bailyk Shidakov	Independent	914	0.47%
against all		8,281	4.25%
Total		194,774	100%

=== 2000 ===
Results by district: Magomet Tekeyev: 40–50% 50–60% 60–70%; Vasily Neshchadimov: 40–50% 50–60%; Muratkhan Mikhailovich: 20–30% 50–60%

==== Declared candidates ====
- Emma Kardanova (Independent), chairwoman of the Fatherland party regional office, 1995 and 1999 candidate for this seat
- Baydymat Kicherukova (Independent), poet, Karachay-Balkar translator
- Muratkhan Mikhailovich (CPRF), electrical engineer, 1999 candidate for this seat
- Vasily Neshchadimov (Independent), former Premier of Karachay-Cherkessia (1999–2000)
- Vladimir Panov (Independent), journalist
- Vladimir Poluboyarenko (Independent), entrepreneur, former prosecutor
- Magomet Tekeyev (Independent), journalist

==== Withdrawn candidates ====
- Azret-Ali Dzhukayev (Independent), prosecutor
- Ansar Tebuyev (Independent), First Deputy Minister of Internal Affairs of Karachay-Cherkessia (1996–present), militsiya colonel, 1999 candidate for this seat

==== Failed to qualify ====
- Ismail Khachirov (Independent), former People's Deputy of the Soviet Union (1989–1991), 1999 candidate for this seat

==== Did not file ====
- Boris Batchayev (Independent), law firm director
- Viktor Skorikov (Independent)

==== Results ====
Summary of the 10 December 2000 by-election in the Karachay-Cherkessia constituency
Candidate	Party	Votes	%
Magomet Tekeyev	Independent	41,103	29.32%
Vasily Neshchadimov	Independent	39,341	28.07%
Muratkhan Mikhailovich	Communist Party	31,648	22.58%
Emma Kardanova	Independent	10,805	7.71%
Vladimir Poluboyarenko	Independent	7,256	5.18%
Vladimir Panov	Independent	2,138	1.53%
Baidymat Kicherukova	Independent	933	0.67%
against all		3,942	2.81%
Total		140,171	100%

=== 2003 ===
==== Declared candidates ====
- Azret Akbayev (Independent), former Member of State Duma (1994–1995)
- Khalit Bairamkulov (Independent), farmer
- Boris Batchayev (Independent), former Secretary of the Security Council of Karachay-Cherkessia, 2000 candidate for this seat
- Anatoly Bogdanov (ORP Rus'), manager
- Osman Botashev (Independent), businessman
- Zagirat Dzhetuganova (Independent), hospital head nurse
- Fatima Dzhogan (Rodina), education union leader
- Azret-Ali Dzhukayev (Independent), prosecutor, 2000 candidate for this seat
- Fyodor Ferisov (RPP-PSS), businessman
- Aleksandr Gorin (Independent), FSB Border Service officer
- Vladimir Grinko (Independent), businessman
- Andrey Gudimov (NRPR), secretary of the party regional office
- Asiyat Khabicheva (SPS), aide to State Duma member, 1995 candidate for this seat
- Sagit Khubiyev (Independent), former Member of People's Assembly of the Karachay-Cherkess Republic (1995–1999), Head of the Department of Federal Postal Service Regional Office
- Oleg Kodzhakov (VR–ES), pensioner
- Nadezhda Maksimova (United Russia), former Deputy Minister of Finance of Russia (2002–2003)
- Muratkhan Mikhailovich (CPRF), electrical engineer, 1999 and 2000 candidate for this seat
- Yevgeny Shramko (DPR), security guard
- Viktor Skorikov (Independent), pensioner, 2000 candidate for this seat
- Alimurat Tekeyev (NPRF), chief state sanitary doctor of Karachayevsk and Karachayevsky District
- Magomet Tekeyev (Independent), incumbent Member of State Duma (2000–present), 2003 presidential candidate
- Igor Timofeyev (Independent), medical executive
- Shagaban Totorkulov (Independent), Ministry of Property Relations of Karachay-Cherkessia official

==== Withdrawn candidates ====
- Akhmat Katchiyev (Independent), construction businessman
- Pyotr Mostovoy (Independent), former Head of the Federal Service for Insolvency and Financial Recovery (1995–1997), attorney

==== Results ====
Summary of the 7 December 2003 Russian legislative election in the Karachay-Cherkessia constituency
Candidate	Party	Votes	%
Nadezhda Maksimova	United Russia	82,529	50.78%
Muratkhan Mikhailovich	Communist Party	13,600	8.37%
Boris Batchayev	Independent	10,634	6.54%
Igor Timofeyev	Independent	7,128	4.39%
Sagit Khubiyev	Independent	7,020	4.32%
Magomet Tekeyev (incumbent)	Independent	5,711	3.51%
Osman Botashev	Independent	4,748	2.92%
Zagirat Dzhegutanova	Independent	2,575	1.58%
Alimurat Tekeyev	People's Party	2,433	1.50%
Fyodor Ferisov	Russian Pensioners' Party-Party of Social Justice	2,300	1.42%
Vladimir Grinko	Independent	1,591	0.98%
Oleg Kodzhakov	Great Russia – Eurasian Union	1,169	0.72%
Azret Akbayev	Independent	872	0.54%
Yevgeny Shramko	Democratic Party	855	0.53%
Viktor Skorikov	Independent	809	0.50%
Azret-Ali Dzhukayev	Independent	685	0.42%
Anatoly Bogdanov	United Russian Party Rus'	669	0.41%
Andrey Gudimov	People's Republican Party	594	0.37%
Shagaban Totorkulov	Independent	571	0.31%
Asiyat Khabicheva	Union of Right Forces	504	0.31%
Khalit Bairamkulov	Independent	490	0.30%
Fatima Dzhogan	Rodina	453	0.28%
against all		5,447	3.35%
Total		162,562	100%

=== 2016 ===
==== Declared candidates ====
- Akhmed Abazov (Yabloko), chairman of the party regional office
- Valery Ayubov (A Just Russia), physical education associate professor
- Rasul Botashev (United Russia), Member of People's Assembly of the Karachay-Cherkess Republic (2009–present), sanatorium director
- Kemal Bytdayev (CPRF), first secretary of the party regional committee
- Muradin Dzhantemirov (The Greens), sanitary doctor
- Alim Kasayev (LDPR), consulting businessman
- Oleg Kodzhakov (Patriots of Russia), Member of People's Assembly of the Karachay-Cherkess Republic (2014–present), 2003 VR–ES candidate for this seat
- Eduard Marshankulov (CPCR), tourism businessman
- Inna Nasheva (Party of Growth), unemployed

==== Withdrawn candidates ====
- Azret Karayev (Rodina), nonprofit director
- Kazim Khubiyev (GP), former People's Assembly of the Karachay-Cherkess Republic (2004–2009), businessman

==== Failed to qualify ====
- Aliy Totorkulov (Independent), businessman, community activist

==== Did not file ====
- Umar Laipanov (Independent), Member of People's Assembly of the Karachay-Cherkess Republic (2009–present)
- Aslanbek Uzdenov (Independent), businessman
- Aleksandr Vedeneyev (Independent), businessman

==== Declined ====
- Akhmat Erkenov (United Russia), Member of State Duma (2007–present) (lost the primary, ran on the party list)
- Mikhail Starshinov (United Russia), Member of State Duma (2007–present) (lost the primary, ran on the party list)
- Murat Suyunchev (United Russia), former Senator from Karachay-Cherkessia (2011–2015) (lost the primary)

==== Results ====
Summary of the 18 September 2016 Russian legislative election in the Karachay-Cherkessia constituency
Candidate	Party	Votes	%
Rasul Botashev	United Russia	151,556	53.03%
Eduard Marshankulov	Communists of Russia	71,517	25.02%
Kemal Bytdayev	Communist Party	19,670	6.88%
Oleg Kodzhakov	Patriots of Russia	8,830	3.09%
Valery Ayubov	A Just Russia	8,266	2.89%
Muradin Dzhantemirov	The Greens	7,982	2.79%
Inna Nasheva	Party of Growth	7,121	2.49%
Akhmed Abazov	Yabloko	5,977	2.09%
Alim Kasayev	Liberal Democratic Party	4,277	1.50%
Total		285,784	100%

=== 2021 ===
==== Declared candidates ====
- Akhmed Abazov (Yabloko), chairman of the party regional office, 2016 candidate for this seat
- Sharifutdin Bostanov (New People), former Member of Electoral Commission of Karachay-Cherkessia (2008–2012), lawyer
- Kemal Bytdayev (CPRF), Member of People's Assembly of Karachay-Cherkessia (2019–present), 2016 candidate for this seat
- Azamat Dudov (SR–ZP), construction foreman
- Muradin Dzhantemirov (The Greens), Member of Erken-Shakhar Council (2017–present), epidemiologist, 2016 candidate for this seat
- Zaur Tekeyev (CPCR), construction executive, perennial candidate
- Dzhasharbek Uzdenov (United Russia), Minister of Natural Resources and Ecology of Karachay-Cherkessia (2020–present)
- Oleg Zhedyayev (LDPR), Member of People's Assembly of Karachay-Cherkessia (2014–present)

==== Withdrawn candidates ====
- Farida Bakhitova (RPPSS), Ministry of Natural Resources and Ecology of Karachay-Cherkessia staffer

==== Failed to qualify ====
- Vera Svetlysheva (Independent), pensioner

==== Declined ====
- Rasul Botashev (United Russia), incumbent Member of State Duma (2016–present)

==== Results ====
Summary of the 17-19 September 2021 Russian legislative election in the Karachay-Cherkessia constituency
Candidate	Party	Votes	%
Dzhasharbek Uzdenov	United Russia	210,632	78.60%
Kemal Bytdayev	Communist Party	28,917	10.79%
Oleg Zhedyayev	Liberal Democratic Party	10,948	4.09%
Azamat Dudov	A Just Russia — For Truth	6,108	2.28%
Zaur Tekeyev	Communists of Russia	3,602	1.34%
Muradin Dzhantemirov	The Greens	3,352	1.25%
Sharifutdin Bostanov	New People	1,960	0.73%
Akhmed Abazov	Yabloko	1,359	0.51%
Total		267,967	100%

=== 2023 ===
==== Declared candidates ====
- Akhmed Abazov (Yabloko), chairman of party regional office, 2016 and 2021 candidate for this seat
- Zaur Akbashev (SR–ZP), businessman, former chairman of Patriots of Russia regional office (2021)
- Kemal Bytdayev (CPRF), Member of People's Assembly of Karachay-Cherkessia (2019–present), 2016 and 2021 candidate for this seat
- Soltan Uzdenov (United Russia), Member of Cherkessk City Duma (2022–present), son of former State Duma member Dzhasharbek Uzdenov
- Oleg Zhedyayev (LDPR), Member of People's Assembly of Karachay-Cherkessia (2009–present), 2021 candidate for this seat

==== Declined ====
- Igor Gonov (United Russia), Member of the People's Assembly of Karachay-Cherkessia (2019–present) (lost the primary)
- Vladimir Umalatov (United Russia), Member of the People's Assembly of Karachay-Cherkessia (2004–present) (lost the primary)

==== Results ====
Summary of the 8–10 September 2023 by-election in the Karachay-Cherkessia constituency
Candidate	Party	Votes	%
Soltan Uzdenov	United Russia	148,692	71.16%
Kemal Bytdayev	Communist Party	27,216	13.03%
Zaur Akbashev	A Just Russia – For Truth	16,280	7.79%
Oleg Zhedyayev	Liberal Democratic Party	13,180	6.31%
Akhmed Abazov	Yabloko	3,213	1.54%
Total		208,947	100%

=== 2026 ===
==== Declared candidates ====
- Akhmed Abazov (Yabloko), chairman of party regional office, 2016, 2021 and 2023 candidate for this seat
- Zaur Akbashev (A Just Russia), agricultural executive, 2023 candidate for this seat
- Farida Bakhitova (RPPSS), Ministry of Natural Resources and Ecology of Karachay-Cherkessia staffer, 2021 candidate for this seat
- Kemal Bytdayev (CPRF), Member of People's Assembly of Karachay-Cherkessia (2019–present), 2016, 2021 and 2023 candidate for this seat
- Aleksandr Chayka (LDPR), Member of People's Assembly of the Karachay-Cherkess Republic (2019–present)
- Muradin Dzhantemirov (The Greens), Member of Erken-Shakhar Council (2017–present), epidemiologist, 2016 and 2021 candidate for this seat
- Zaur Tekeyev (CPCR), Member of Karachayevsk Duma (2022–present), construction executive, 2021 candidate for this seat
- Soltan Uzdenov (United Russia), incumbent Member of State Duma (2023–present)

==== Declined ====
- Tatyana Chernyayeva (United Russia), Member of People's Assembly of Karachay-Cherkessia (2019–present) (lost the primary, running on the party list)
- Valery Deduk (United Russia), Head of Cherkessk – Chairman of the City Duma (2022–present) (lost the primary, running on the party list)
- Aleksey Ganshin (United Russia), Member of People's Assembly of Karachay-Cherkessia (2014–present) (lost the primary, running on the party list)
- Sergey Smorodin (United Russia), Member of Cherkessk City Duma (2022–present), former Deputy Premier of Karachay-Cherkessia – Minister of Construction and Housing Utilities (2011–2020) (lost the primary, running on the party list)

==== Results ====
Summary of the 18-20 September 2026 Russian legislative election in the Karachay-Cherkessia constituency
Candidate	Party	Votes	%
Soltan Uzdenov (incumbent)	United Russia	185,713	73.28%
Kemal Bytdayev	Communist Party	33,327	13.15%
Aleksandr Chayka	Liberal Democratic Party	17,868	7.05%
Zaur Akbashev	A Just Russia	6,159	2.43%
Akhmed Abazov	Yabloko	3,523	1.39%
Zaur Tekeyev	Communists of Russia	2,585	1.02%
Muradin Dzhantemirov	The Greens	1,901	0.75%
Farida Bakhitova	Party of Pensioners	1,293	0.51%
Total		253,440	100%
