= By-elections to the 8th Russian State Duma =

Russian election

By-elections to the 8th Russian State Duma will be held to fill vacancies in the State Duma between the 2021 election and the 2026 election.

According to article 97 of the Federal Law "On elections of deputies of the State Duma", by-elections are appointed on the second Sunday of September (single voting day), but not less than 85 days before the day of voting. This means that if a vacant seat occurs before a single voting day, but less than 85 days before it, the election will be scheduled for next year. Also, by-elections are not appointed and are not held if, as a result of these elections, a Deputy can not be elected for a term of more than one year before the end of the constitutional term for which the State Duma was elected.

== Overview ==
Constituency	Date	Former MP	Party	Cause	Winner	Party	Retained
Simferopol	8–10 September 2023	Alexey Chernyak	United Russia	Resigned	Yury Nesterenko	United Russia	Yes
Lipetsk	8–10 September 2023	Nikolay Bortsov	United Russia	Death	Dmitry Averov	United Russia	Yes
Karachay-Cherkessia	8–10 September 2023	Dzhasharbek Uzdenov	United Russia	Death	Soltan Uzdenov	United Russia	Yes
Divnogorsk	8–10 September 2023	Viktor Zubarev	United Russia	Death	Sergey Yeryomin	United Russia	Yes
Khakassia	6–8 September 2024	Sergey Sokol	United Russia	New Post	Nikolay Shulginov	Independent	No (Note: Shulginov eventually joined United Russia faction in the State Duma)
Southern	6–8 September 2024	Vitaly Kushnarev	United Russia	New Post	Viktoria Abramchenko	United Russia	Yes
Unecha	6–8 September 2024	Nikolay Alekseyenko	United Russia	Resigned	Oleg Matytsin	United Russia	Yes
Biysk	14 September 2025	Aleksandr Prokopyev	United Russia	New Post	By-election cancelled		
Skopin	14 September 2025	Dmitry Khubezov	United Russia	New Post	By-election cancelled		
Krasnodar	14 September 2025	Yevgeny Pervyshov	United Russia	New Post	By-election cancelled		
Samara	14 September 2025	Alexander Khinshtein	United Russia	New Post	By-election cancelled		
Magadan	14 September 2025	Anton Basansky	United Russia	New Post	By-election cancelled		
Prokopyevsk	14 September 2025	Dmitry Islamov	United Russia	New Post	By-election cancelled		
Ufa	14 September 2025	Pavel Kachkayev	United Russia	Death	By-election cancelled		
Engels	14 September 2025	Alexander Strelyukhin	United Russia	New Post	By-election cancelled		
Volzhsky	14 September 2025	Oleg Savchenko	United Russia	Resigned	By-election cancelled		

== 8–10 September 2023 ==
=== Simferopol ===
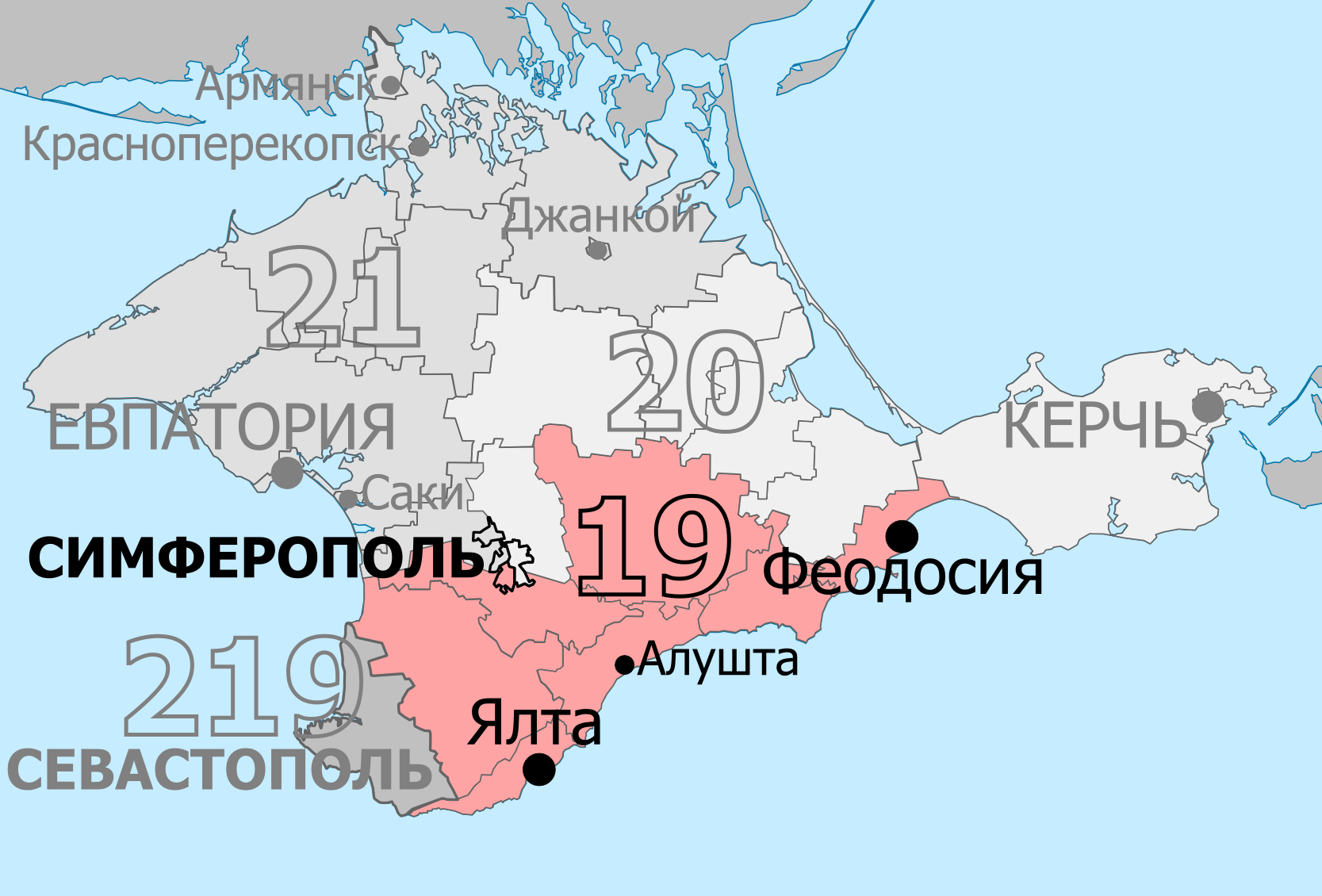
Map of Simferopol constituency

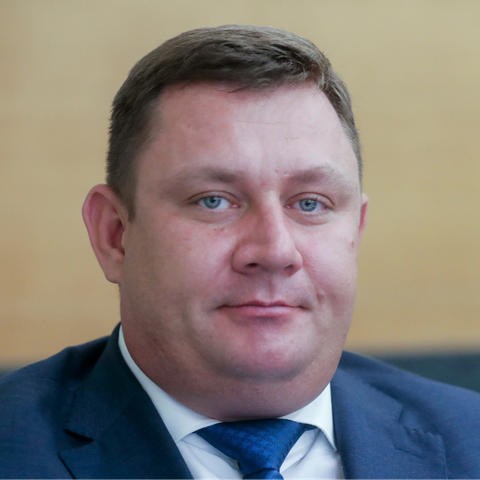
Elected Deputy Yury Nesterenko

On 3 September 2022, Deputy Alexey Chernyak of Simferopol constituency asked for his resignation from the State Duma to focus on work in Crimea. The request was approved on 13 September, however, the by-election was scheduled for next single election day, 10 September 2023, 372 days after the resignation. On 10 September 2023, Simferopol City Council member Yury Nesterenko won the by-election.

==== Registered candidates ====
- Dmitry Fridman (LDPR), Member of Alushta City Council (2019–present)
- Stepan Kiskin (SR–ZP), former Member of Simferopol City Council (2014–2019)
- Yury Nesterenko (United Russia), Member of Simferopol City Council (2014–2023)
- Vasily Sayenko (CPRF), Member of Simferopol City Council (2019–present)
- Aleksandr Turov (Communists of Russia), pensioner

==== Did not file ====
- Sait Umerov (Independent), security specialist, United Russia primary candidate

==== Eliminated in United Russia primary ====
- Olga Pavolotskaya, unemployed
- Alik Palakyan, unemployed
- Maxim Pinayev, entrepreneur
- Igor Savchenko, unemployed
- Alexander Stolbov, Sergeant of the Russian Armed Forces
- Sait Umerov, controller of Crocus International JSC (running as an independent)
- Alexander Chuvakov, Commander of the 6th department of the Fire and Rescue Unit of Simferopol

==== Declined ====
- Viktor Bout (LDPR), entrepreneur, arms dealer, convicted in 2012 in the United States for 25 years in prison for intending to illegally carry out arms trafficking and exchanged in 2022

==== Results ====
Summary of the 8–10 September 2023 by-election in the Simferopol constituency
Candidate	Party	Votes	%
Yury Nesterenko	United Russia	97,343	68.71%
Stepan Kiskin	A Just Russia – For Truth	10,589	7.47%
Vasily Sayenko	Communist Party	10,472	7.39%
Aleksandr Turov	Communists of Russia	9,233	6.52%
Dmitry Fridman	Liberal Democratic Party	9,167	6.47%
Total		141,679	100%

=== Lipetsk ===
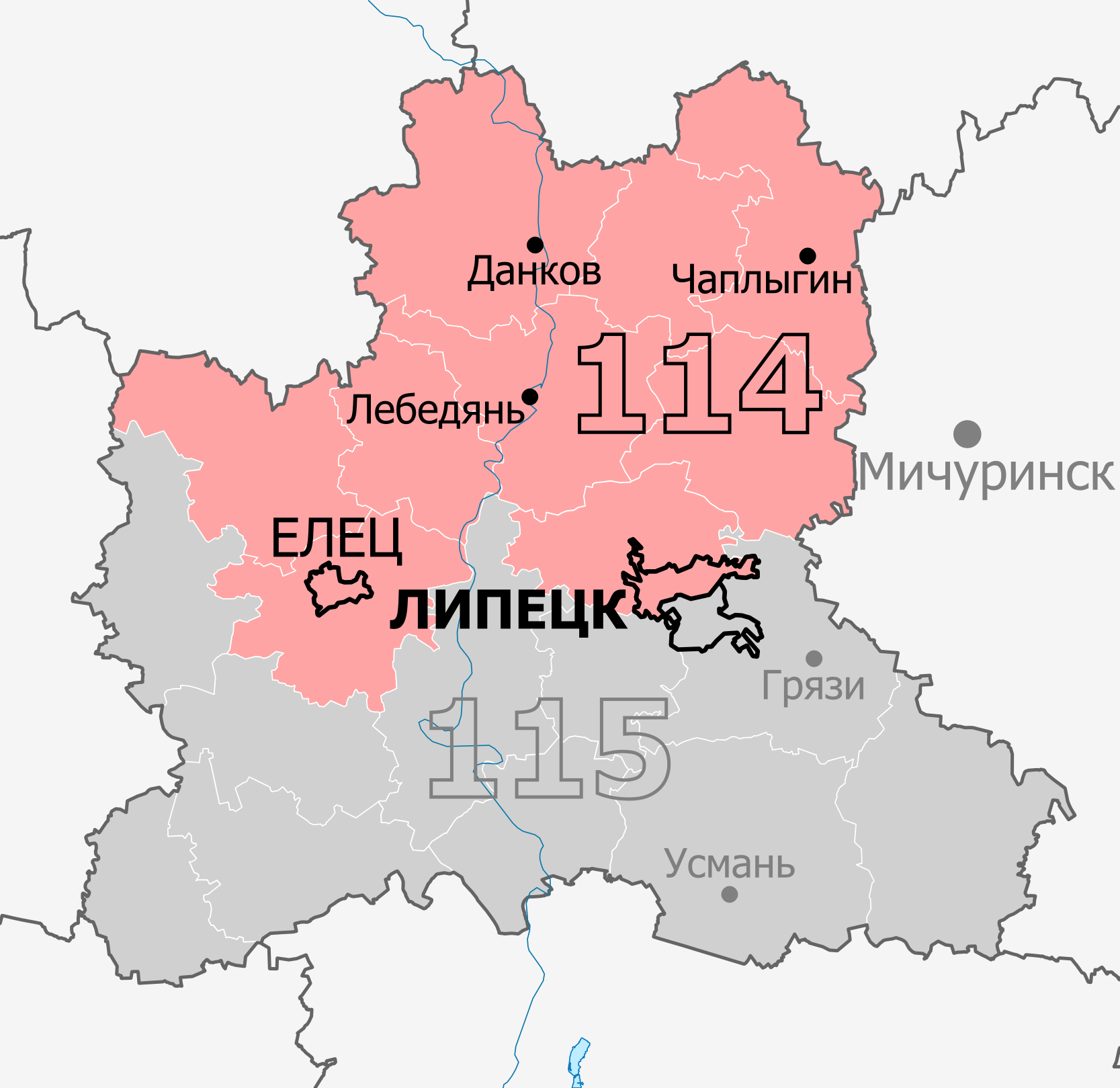
Map of Lipetsk constituency

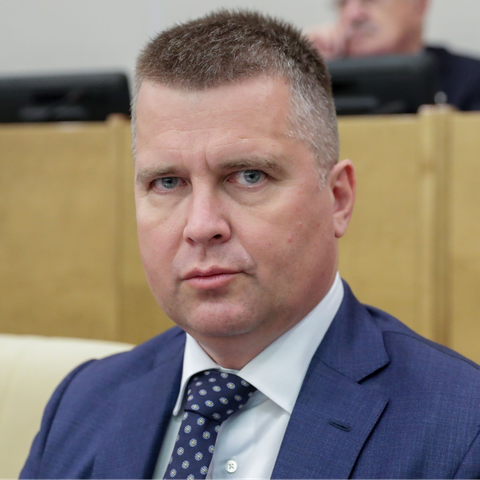
Elected Deputy Dmitry Averov

Longtime Deputy Nikolay Bortsov, a wealthy agribusinessman who represented Lipetsk Oblast in the State Duma for nearly 20 years, died on 23 April 2023 at the age of 77. A by-election was held on the nearest single election day, 10 September 2023. On 10 September 2023, Lipetsk Oblast Council of Deputies chairman Dmitry Averov won the by-election.

==== Registered candidates ====
- Dmitry Averov (United Russia), Chairman of the Lipetsk Oblast Council of Deputies (2021–2023), former Senator from Lipetsk Oblast (2021)
- Larisa Ksenofontova (SR–ZP), Member of Lipetsk Oblast Council of Deputies (2011–present), 2019 gubernatorial candidate
- Oleg Tokarev (Communists of Russia), former Member of Lipetsk Oblast Electoral Commission (2021–2023)
- Sergey Tokarev (CPRF), Member of Lipetsk Oblast Council of Deputies (2011–present), 2019 gubernatorial candidate
- Anatoly Yemelyanov (LDPR), Member of Lipetsk Oblast Council of Deputies (2021–present), 2021 candidate for this seat

==== Did not file ====
- Anton Rychkov (Yabloko), shooting instructor

==== Eliminated in United Russia primary ====
- Nikolay Golosov, Director of the Center for the Development of Children's Recreation
- Leonid Gusev, retired Captain 1st rank of the Russian Navy, Chairman of the Lipetsk Branch of the All-Russian Fleet Support Movement
- Margarita Zhirova, Head of the Department of the Youth Center
- Vladimir Khabibullin, Head of the Department for Physical Culture, Sports and Youth Policy of the Yelets City Administration

==== Declined ====
- Nikolay Bykovskikh (CPRF), Member of Lipetsk Oblast Council of Deputies (2021–present), 2021 runner-up for this seat

==== Results ====
Summary of the 8–10 September 2023 by-election in the Lipetsk constituency
Candidate	Party	Votes	%
Dmitry Averov	United Russia	106,525	58.78%
Sergey Tokarev	Communist Party	25,305	13.96%
Anatoly Yemelyanov	Liberal Democratic Party	17,553	9.69%
Larisa Ksenofontova	A Just Russia – For Truth	15,618	8.62%
Oleg Tokarev	Communists of Russia	11,783	6.50%
Total		181,222	100%

=== Karachay-Cherkessia ===
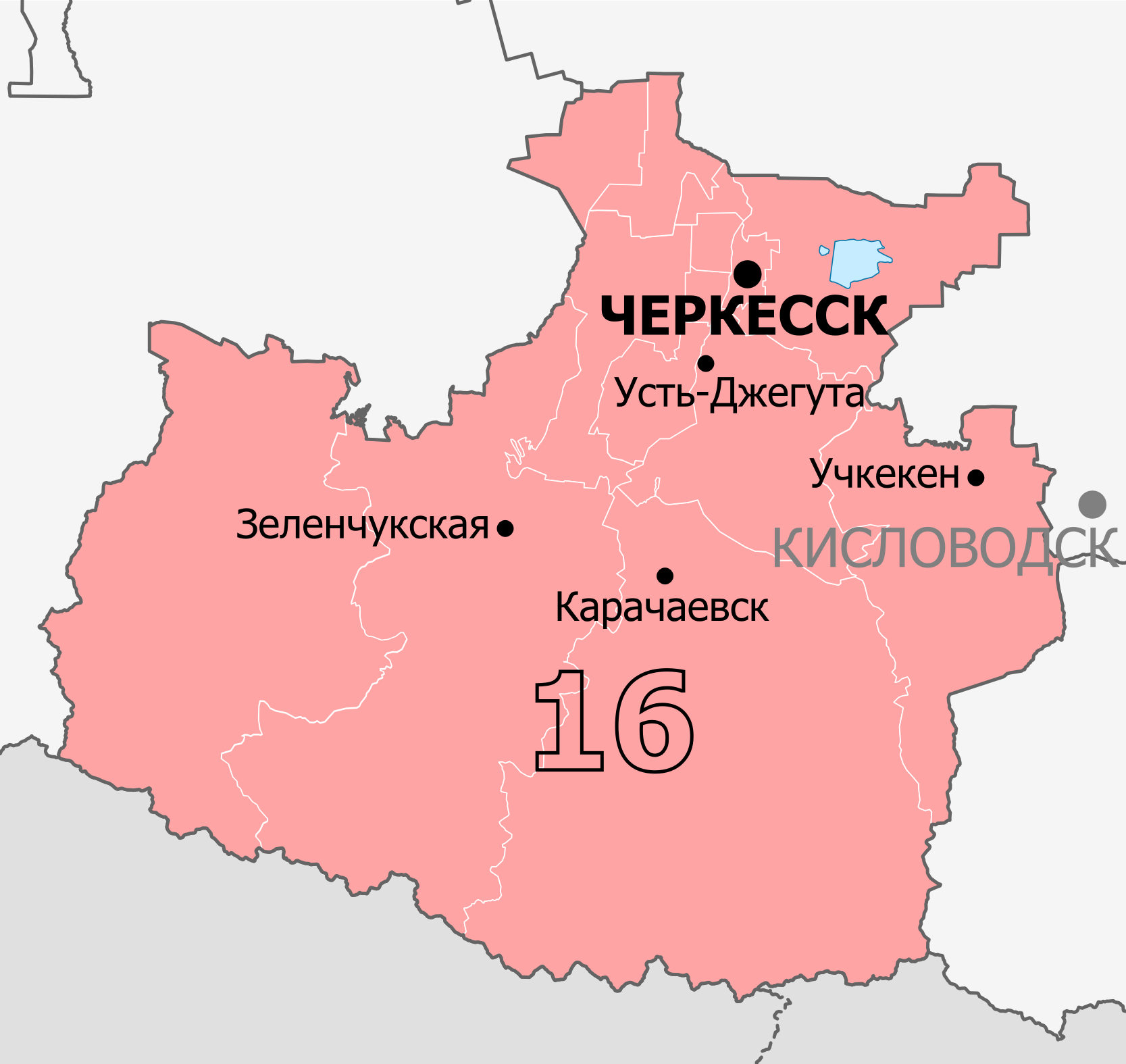
Map of Karachay-Cherkessia constituency

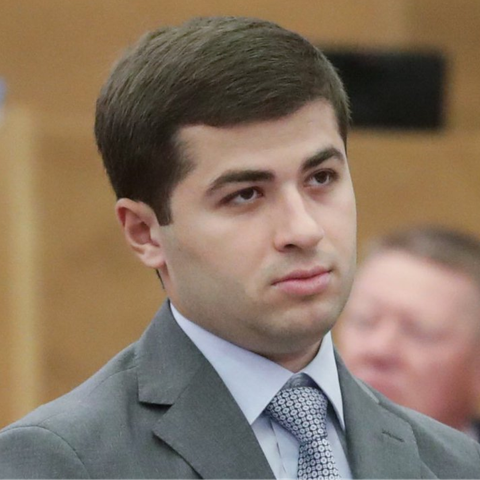
Elected Deputy Soltan Uzdenov

Freshman State Duma member Dzhasharbek Uzdenov from Karachay-Cherkessia died on 23 April 2023 after battling with a severe illness since his initial election in 2021. A by-election will be held on the nearest single election day, 10 September 2023. On 10 September 2023, Cherkessk City Duma member and son of the previous late incumbent Soltan Uzdenov won the by-election.

==== Registered candidates ====
- Akhmed Abazov (Yabloko), chairman of Yabloko regional office, 2016 and 2021 candidate for this seat
- Zaur Akbashev (SR–ZP), businessman, former chairman of Patriots of Russia regional office (2021)
- Kemal Bytdayev (CPRF), Member of People's Assembly of Karachay-Cherkessia (2019–present), 2016 and 2021 candidate for this seat
- Soltan Uzdenov (United Russia), Member of Cherkessk City Duma (2022–2023), son of Dzhasharbek Uzdenov
- Oleg Zhedyayev (LDPR), Member of People's Assembly of Karachay-Cherkessia (2009–present), 2021 candidate for this seat

==== Eliminated in United Russia primary ====
- Ahmed Baterbiyev, Member of Cherkessk City Duma (2002–present)
- Igor Gonov, Member of the People's Assembly of Karachay-Cherkessia (2019–present)
- Tatyana Ivakhnova, Member of Cherkessk City Duma (2022–present)
- Elena Lyashova, Director of the Education Center No. 11
- Vladimir Umalatov, Member of the People's Assembly of Karachay-Cherkessia (2004–present)

==== Results ====
Summary of the 8–10 September 2023 by-election in the Karachay-Cherkessia constituency
Candidate	Party	Votes	%
Soltan Uzdenov	United Russia	148,692	71.16%
Kemal Bytdayev	Communist Party	27,216	13.03%
Zaur Akbashev	A Just Russia – For Truth	16,280	7.79%
Oleg Zhedyayev	Liberal Democratic Party	13,180	6.31%
Akhmed Abazov	Yabloko	3,213	1.54%
Total		208,947	100%

=== Divnogorsk ===
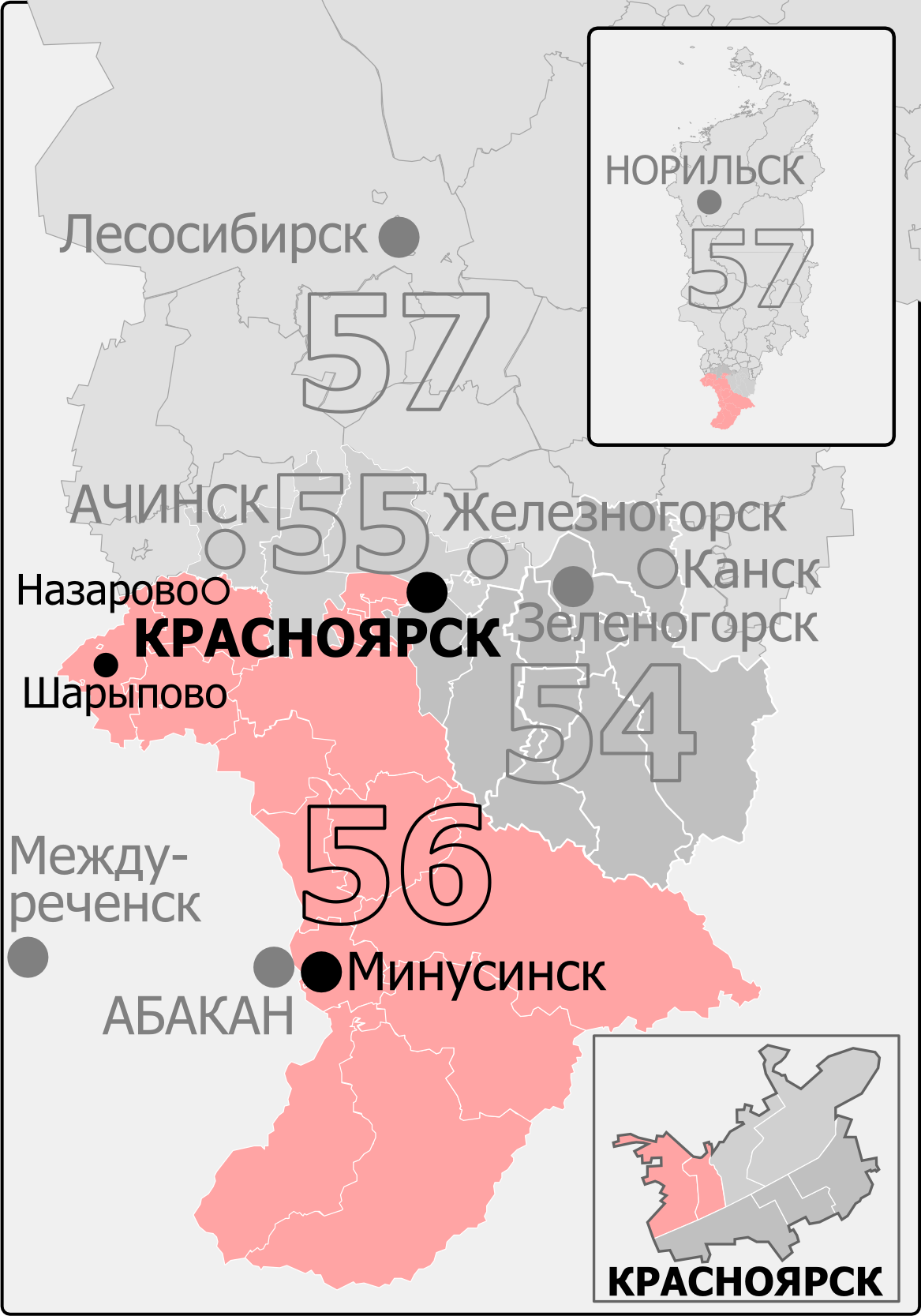
Map of Divnogorsk constituency

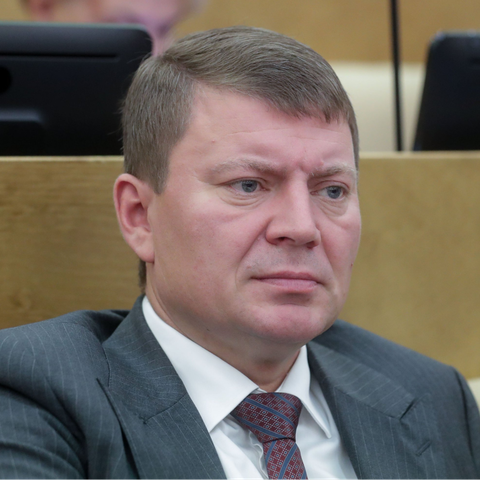
Elected Deputy Sergey Yeryomin

Four-term State Duma member Viktor Zubarev from Krasnoyarsk Krai died on 31 May 2023 in Moscow. A by-election was held on the nearest single election day, 10 September 2023. On 10 September 2023, Krasnoyarsk Krai Deputy Governor Sergey Yeryomin won the by-election.

==== Registered candidates ====
- Grigory Gavrilov (LDPR), Member of Divnogorsk City Council of Deputies (2023–present), aide to State Duma member Sergey Karginov
- Ksenia Kadakina (SR–ZP), personnel manager
- Andrey Kucheryavy (Yabloko), retired police colonel
- Dmitry Semirenko (CPRF), Deputy Chairman of Shushensky District Council of Deputies (2020–present), businessman, veteran of the Russian invasion of Ukraine
- Ivan Serebryakov (Rodina), former Member of Legislative Assembly of Krasnoyarsk Krai (2016–2021), 2014, 2018 and 2023 gubernatorial candidate
- Sergey Yeryomin (United Russia), Deputy Governor of Krasnoyarsk Krai (2022–2023), former mayor of Krasnoyarsk (2017–2022)

==== Eliminated in United Russia primary ====
- Denis Dudalev, Deputy Chief Engineer of Krasnoyarsk Regional Energy Company JSC;
- Andrey Birikh, CEO of Marininskoye CJSC;
- Anna Okladnikova, Chief Specialist of the Krasnoyarsk Krai Tourism Agency;
- Vera Sakova, Director of the Integrated Center for Social Services of the population "Nadezhda".

==== Declined ====
- Maksim Markert (SR–ZP), Member of Legislative Assembly of Krasnoyarsk Krai (2011–2016, 2018–present) (running for Governor)
- Boris Melnichenko (CPRF), Member of Legislative Assembly of Krasnoyarsk Krai (2007–2016, 2021–present), agribusinessman, 2021 runner-up for this seat

==== Results ====
Summary of the 8–10 September 2023 by-election in the Divnogorsk constituency
Candidate	Party	Votes	%
Sergey Yeryomin	United Russia	111,032	57.54%
Dmitry Semirenko	Communist Party	20,352	10.55%
Grigory Gavrilov	Liberal Democratic Party	19,732	10.23%
Ivan Serebryakov	Rodina	14,849	7.70%
Ksenia Kadakina	A Just Russia – For Truth	12,159	6.30%
Andrey Kucheryavy	Yabloko	5,665	2.94%
Total		192,967	100%

== 6–8 September 2024 ==
=== Khakassia ===
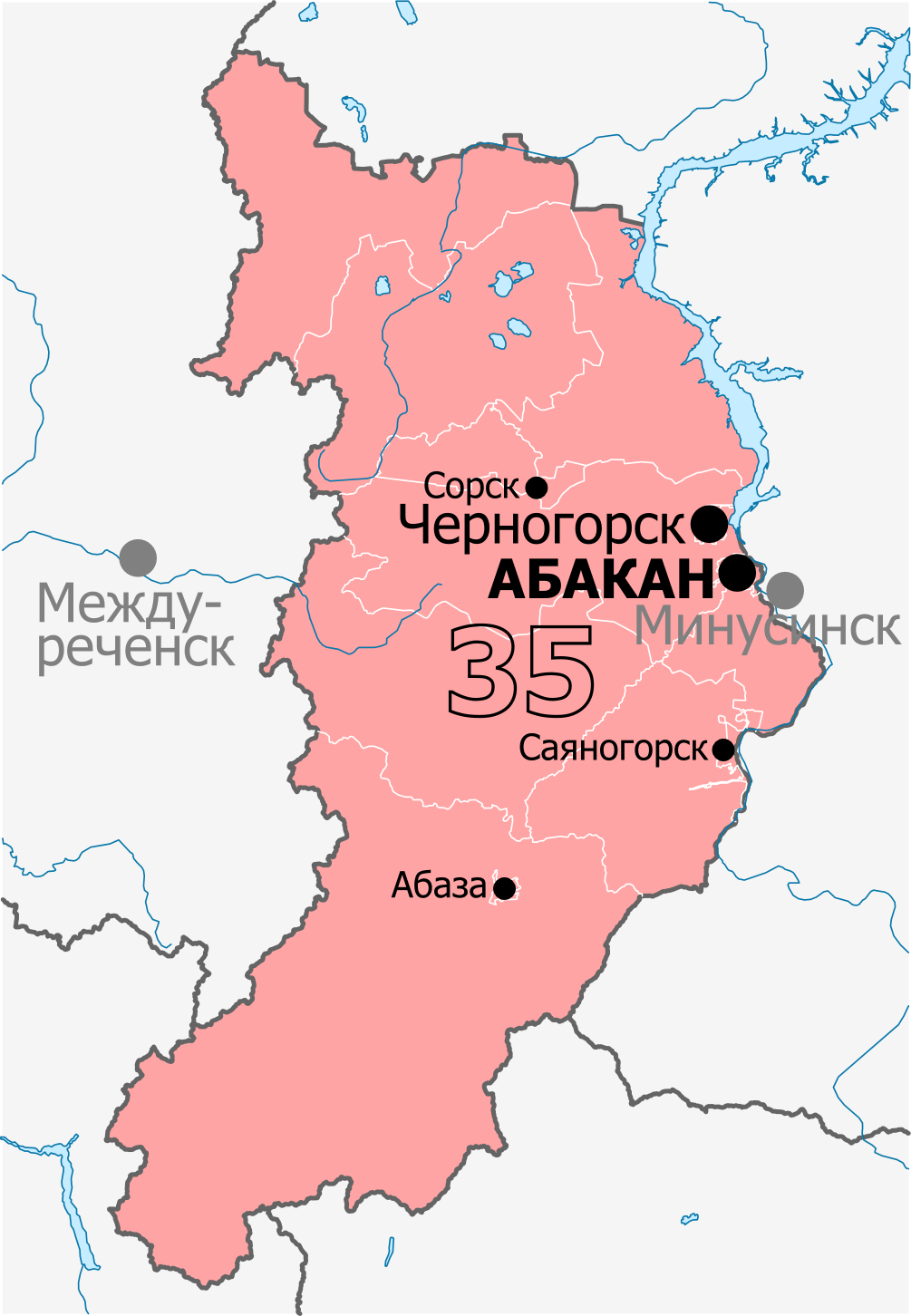
Map of Khakassia constituency

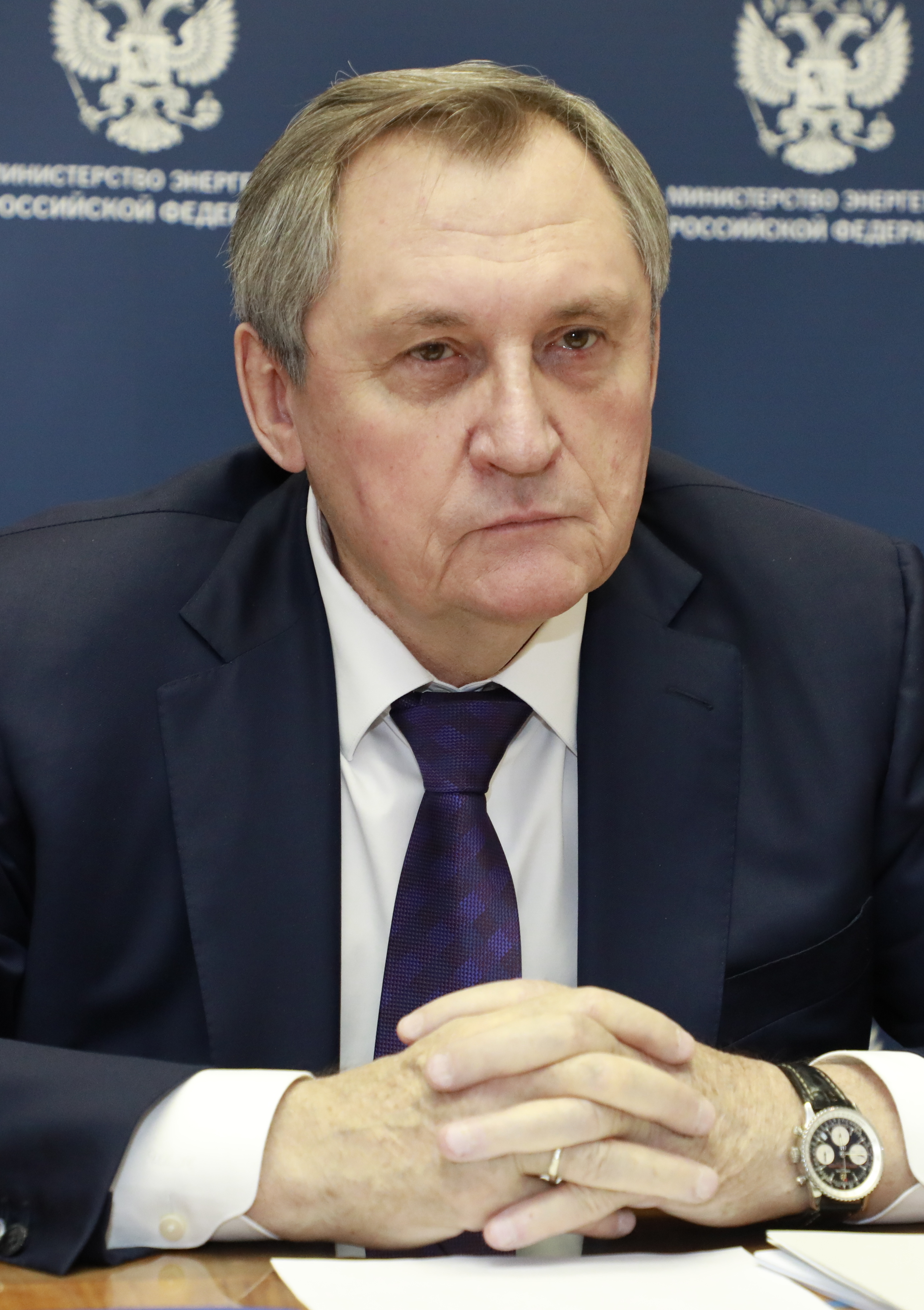
Elected Deputy Nikolay Shulginov

First-term State Duma member Sergey Sokol was elected to the Supreme Council of the Republic of Khakassia on 10 September 2023 and decided to resigned from the State Duma in preparation to assume the speakership of the regional parliament. A by-election was held on the nearest single election day, 8 September 2024, which was won by former Minister of Energy of Russia Nikolay Shulginov.

After candidates had already filed for the United Russia primary, former deputy for this seat and secretary of the United Russia regional office Sergey Sokol suggested the party not standing its own candidate and supporting a "united candidate from all political forces in Khakassia", which was endorsed by Senator Sergey Perminov, Deputy Secretary General of United Russia. The United Russia primary for the seat was ultimately cancelled.

Vitaly Minakov, a professional MMA fighter and four-time World Sambo champion who ran in the Unecha constituency in 2021 from A Just Russia – For Truth, was initially reported as potential unity candidate, supported by Rusal – a major enterprise in the republic. Later the role of a consensus candidate was left for former Deputy Prime Minister of Russia Viktoria Abramchenko, a Chernogorsk native, who was not reappointed to the Mikhail Mishustin's Second Cabinet, however, in late May 2024 she was announced as United Russia candidate in a Southern constituency by-election. Among other mentioned candidates were Moscow City Duma member and cosmonaut Oleg Artemyev and even Head of Khakassia Valentin Konovalov. On June 10, 2024, Konovalov and Sokol held a joint meeting with former Minister of Energy of Russia Nikolay Shulginov, where they offered Shulginov to run for State Duma with their support, which Shulginov accepted.

==== Registered candidates ====
- Mikhail Gayday (ZA!), party press secretary
- Sergey Izmaylov (Civic Platform), businessman
- Anton Palyulin (PPD), attorney
- Nikolay Shulginov (Independent), former Minister of Energy of Russia (2020–2024)
- Georgy Slyvus (The Greens), individual entrepreneur
- Vladimir Smyshlyayev (SR–ZP), Member of Council of Chernogorsk (2017–present), road safety manager

==== Withdrawn candidates ====
- Vyacheslav Baltsevich (United Russia), Russian Army Lieutenant, community activist
- Gennady Ishchenko (United Russia), United Russia regional party office chief agitator
- Aleksey Izmestyev (United Russia), Russian Army soldier
- Tatyana Kozhina (United Russia), legal counsel
- Vitaly Malinovsky (United Russia), Moscow Oblast administration staffer
- Aleksey Salnikov (United Russia), nonprofit director
- Andrey Shulbayev (United Russia), Commissioner for Human Rights of the Republic of Khakassia (2019–present)
- Igor Shulgin (United Russia), entrepreneur
- Vera Ushakova (United Russia), fire department dispatcher
- Kirill Zagorulko (United Russia), municipal official
- Vadim Zamarayev (United Russia), senior lecturer
- Anton Zhdanov (United Russia), disinfector

==== Declined ====
- Viktoria Abramchenko (United Russia), former Deputy Prime Minister of Russia (2020–2024) (running in the Southern constituency)
- Oleg Artemyev (United Russia), Member of Moscow City Duma (2019–present), cosmonaut
- Yevgeny Cheltygmashev (Independent), Member of Supreme Council of Khakassia (2019–present), 2021 candidate for this seat
- Oleg Golovchenko (CPRF), entrepreneur (running for Mayor of Abakan)
- Oleg Ivanov (Independent), Member of Supreme Council of Khakassia (2009–present), 2013 PARNAS head candidate, 2016 Yabloko candidate for this seat, 2018 RPPSS head candidate
- Valentin Konovalov (CPRF), Head of the Republic of Khakassia (2018–present), former Member of Supreme Council of Khakassia (2018) (endorsed Shulginov)
- Nina Leonchenko (CPRF), Head of Ust-Abakan (2018–present)
- Igor Mamontov, advisor to Head of the Republic of Khakassia Valentin Konovalov, former head of United Russia regional office executive committee (2015–2021)
- Vitaly Minakov (Independent), professional MMA fighter, 2008–2011 World Sambo champion
- Mikhail Molchanov (LDPR), Member of Supreme Council of Khakassia (2022–present), 2021 candidate for this seat, 2023 head candidate
- Grigory Nazarenko (CPRF), Deputy Chairman of the Supreme Council of Khakassia (2023–present), Member of the Supreme Council (2018–present)
- Vladimir Shtygashev (CPRF), Member of Supreme Council of Khakassia (1990–present), former Chairman of the Supreme Council of Khakassia (1990–1992, 1992–2023), former Deputy Chairman of the Supreme Soviet of the Russian SFSR (1985–1990)
- Valery Starostin (CPRF), Member of Supreme Council of Khakassia (2009–present), 2021 candidate for this seat

==== Results ====
Summary of the 6–8 September 2024 by-election in the Khakassia constituency
Candidate	Party	Votes	%
Nikolay Shulginov	Independent	59,730	55.30%
Vladimir Smyshlyayev	A Just Russia – For Truth	32,189	29.80%
Mikhail Gayday	Green Alternative	3,332	3.09%
Sergey Izmaylov	Civic Platform	2,539	2.35%
Anton Palyulin	Party of Direct Democracy	1,938	1.79%
Georgy Slyvus	The Greens	1,783	1.65%
Total		108,002	100%

=== Southern ===
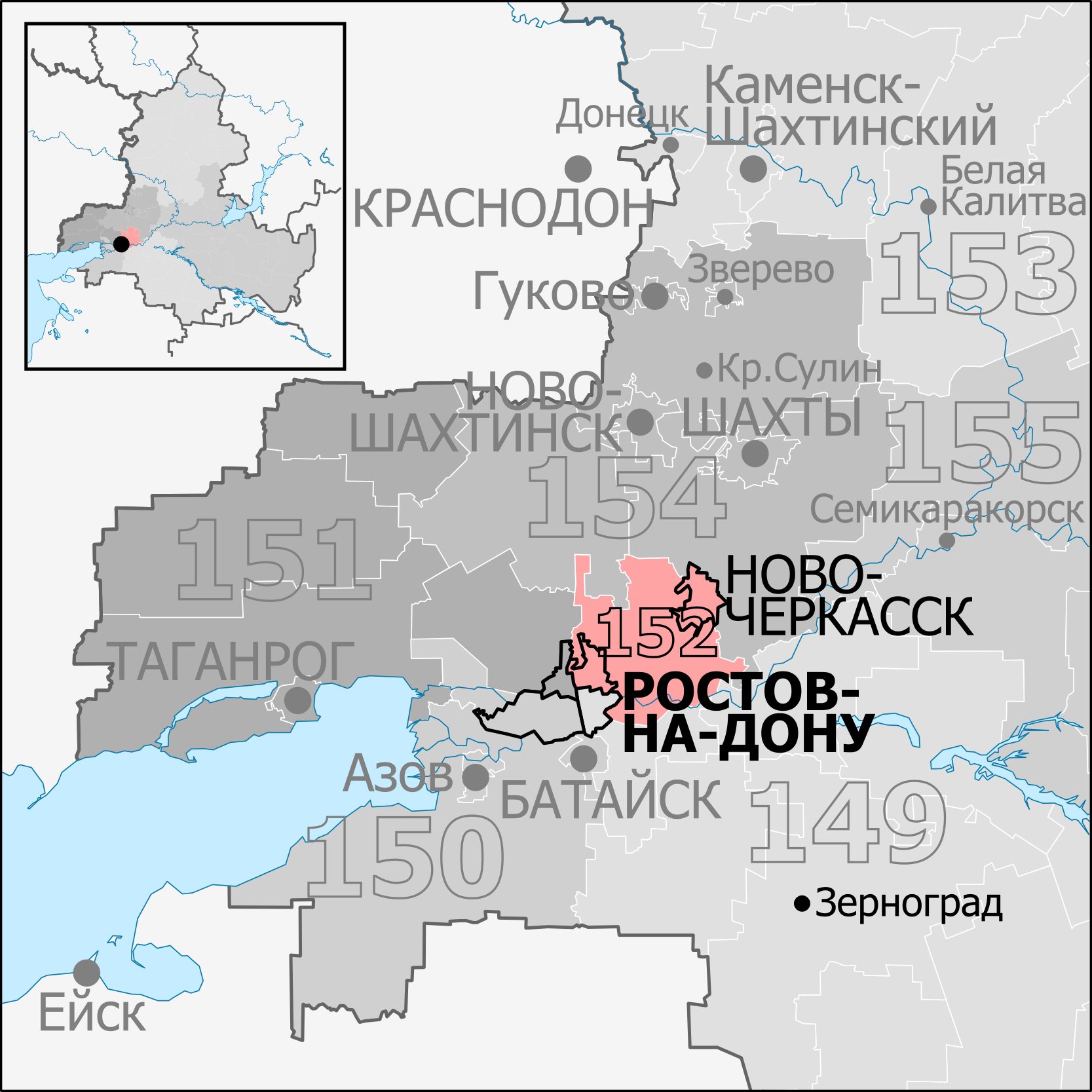
Map of Southern constituency

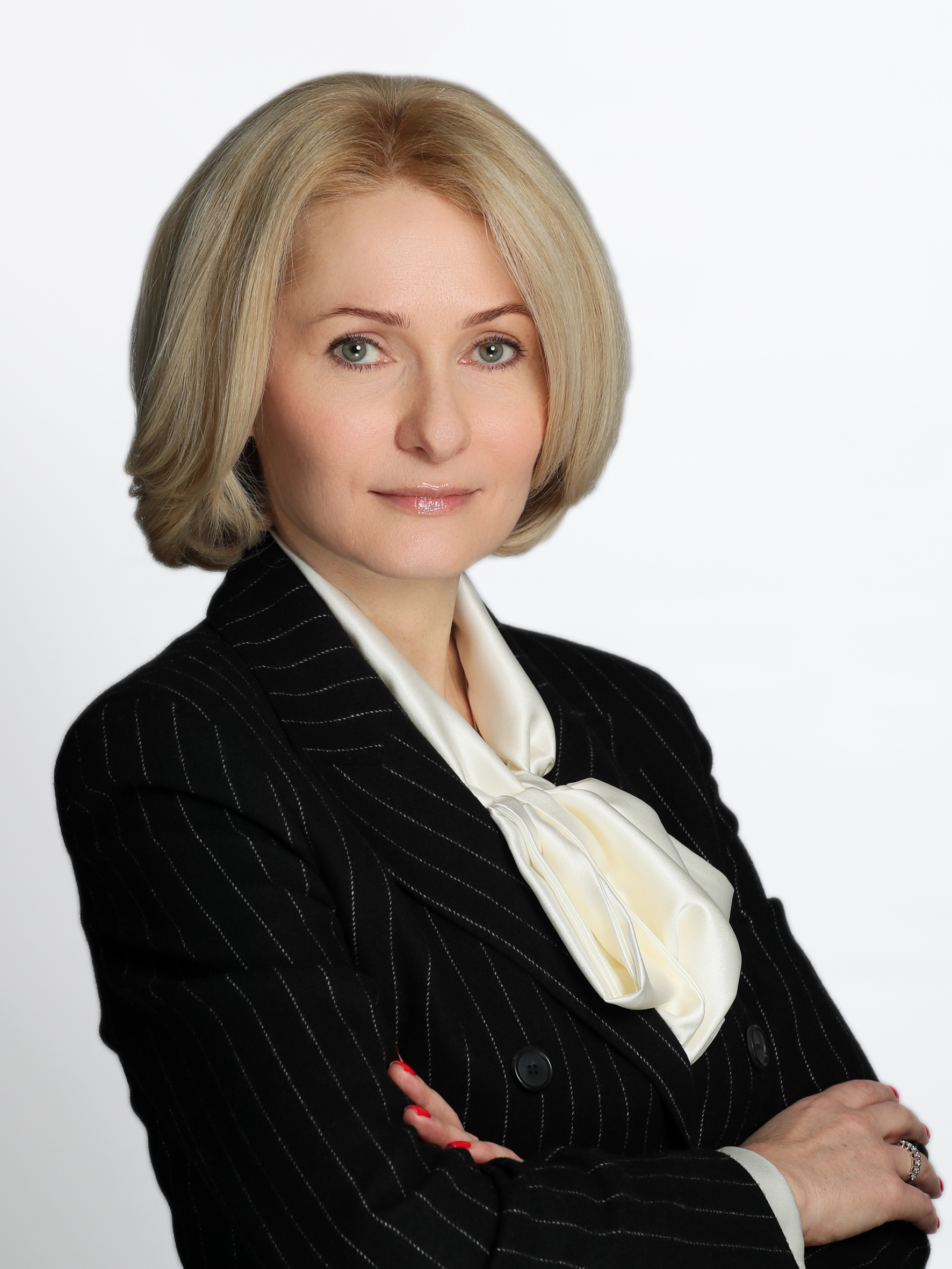
Elected Deputy Viktoria Abramchenko

Vitaly Kushnarev, first-term State Duma member and former mayor of Rostov-on-Don, announced his intention to resign his seat in the Duma after he was appointed Deputy Governor of Rostov Oblast – Minister of Transport of Rostov Oblast on May 23, 2024. A by-election was held on the nearest single election day, 8 September 2024, which was won by former Deputy Prime Minister of Russia Viktoria Abramchenko.

==== Registered candidates ====
- Viktoria Abramchenko (United Russia), former Deputy Prime Minister of Russia (2020–2024)
- Maksim Fyodorov (SR–ZP), Member of Rassvet Council of Deputies (2021–present), Almighty Don Host cossack druzhinnik
- Roman Klimov (LDPR), Member of Legislative Assembly of Rostov Oblast (2023–present), transportation businessman
- Natalya Oskina (CPRF), Member of Rostov-on-Don City Duma (2020–present), individual entrepreneur
- Dmitry Velichko (New People), former Member of Legislative Assembly of Rostov Oblast (2018–2023), businessman
- Aleksandr Yefimov (Yabloko), businessman

==== Declined ====
- Nikolay Shulginov (United Russia), former Minister of Energy of Russia (2020–2024) (running in the Khakassia constituency)

==== Results ====
Summary of the 6–8 September 2024 by-election in the Southern constituency
Candidate	Party	Votes	%
Viktoria Abramchenko	United Russia	154,908	75.73%
Natalya Oskina	Communist Party	23,069	11.28%
Maksim Fyodorov	A Just Russia – For Truth	9,075	4.44%
Dmitry Velichko	New People	6,827	3.34%
Roman Klimov	Liberal Democratic Party	5,693	2.78%
Aleksandr Yefimov	Yabloko	2,972	1.45%
Total		204,566	100%

=== Unecha ===
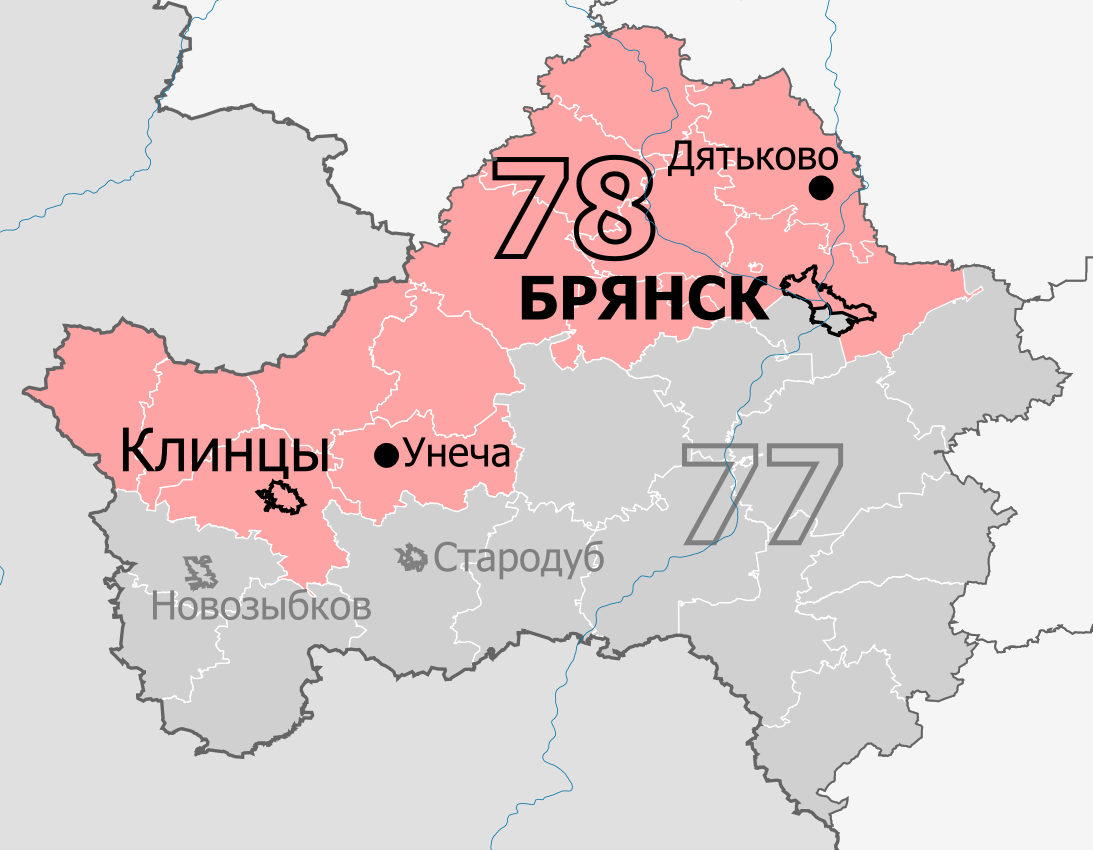
Map of Unecha constituency

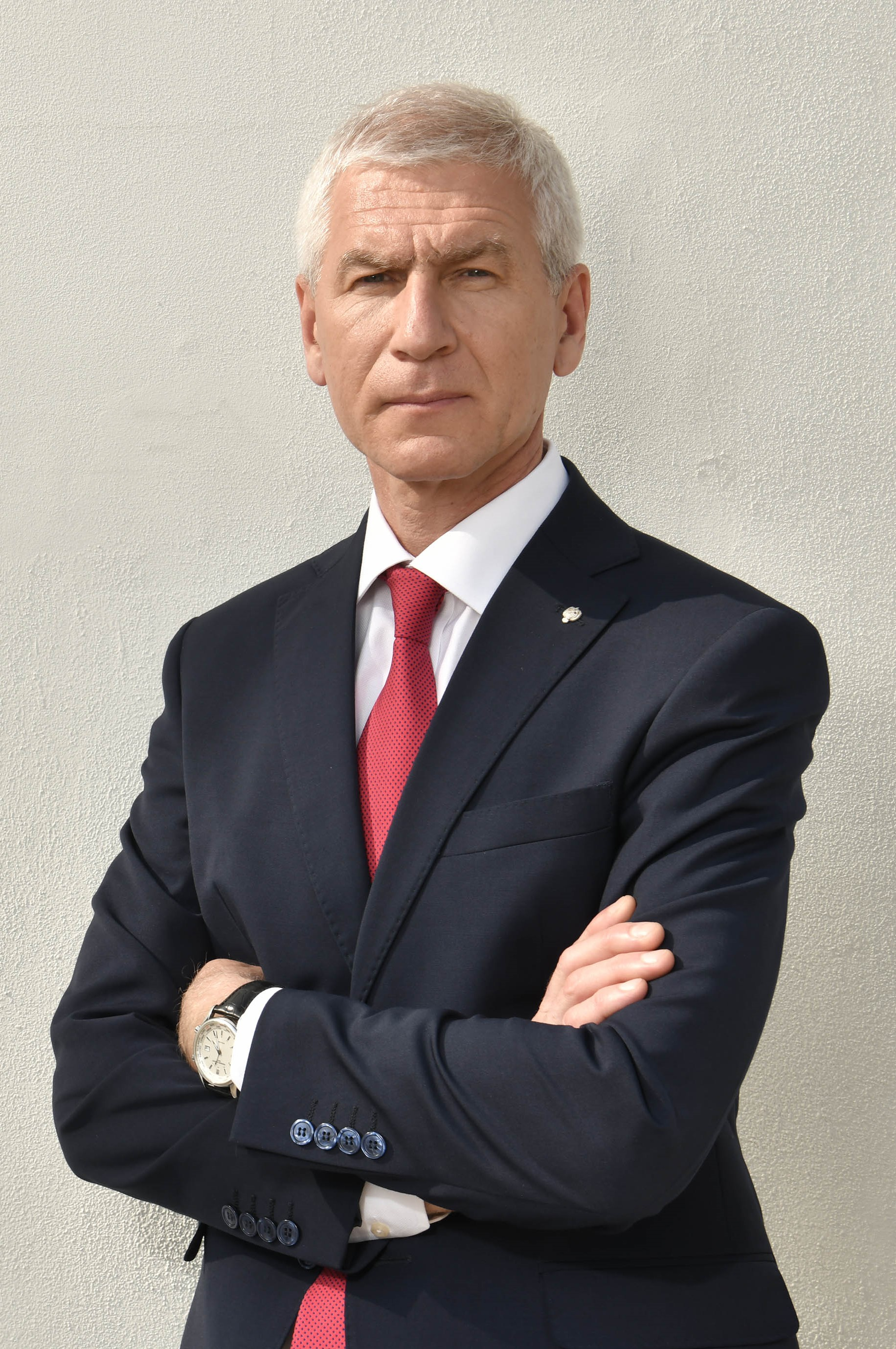
Elected Deputy Oleg Matytsin

First-term State Duma member Nikolay Alekseyenko announced his intention to resign his seat in the Duma on May 27, 2024. A by-election will be held on the nearest single election day, 8 September 2024, which was won by former Minister of Sport of Russia Oleg Matytsin.

==== Registered candidates ====
- Andrey Arkhitsky (CPRF), Member of Bryansk Oblast Duma (2009–2014, 2019–present), 2016 and 2021 runner-up for this seat, 2020 gubernatorial candidate
- Sergey Gorelov (New People), businessman, 2016 Party of Growth candidate for this seat
- Oleg Matytsin (United Russia), former Minister of Sport of Russia (2020–2024)
- Aleksey Timoshkov (SR–ZP), individual entrepreneur
- Ruslan Titov (LDPR), former Member of Steklyannaya Raditsa Rural Council of People's Deputies (2018–2023), park chief engineer

==== Results ====
Summary of the 6–8 September 2024 by-election in the Unecha constituency
Candidate	Party	Votes	%
Oleg Matytsin	United Russia	180,650	68.01%
Andrey Arkhitsky	Communist Party	32,432	12.21%
Ruslan Titov	Liberal Democratic Party	20,626	7.76%
Aleksey Timoshkov	A Just Russia – For Truth	13,721	5.17%
Sergey Gorelov	New People	13,541	5.10%
Total		204,566	100%

== 14 September 2025 ==
Nine State Duma constituencies that became vacant in late 2024 – early 2025 were initially scheduled to hold by-elections on September 14, 2025, however, in February 2025 a group of senators and deputies led by Andrey Klishas introduced a bill banning all by-elections to federal, regional and municipal legislatures during two years prior to the regular election (current law prevents holding by-elections only during the last year of the convocation). On May 20, 2025, State Duma adopted amendments to the electoral law, including the banning of by-elections two years prior to the regular election by a 327–54 vote. On May 21 Federation Council approved the amendments and on May 23 President Vladimir Putin signed the bill into law. Following the bill passage all 2025 State Duma by-elections were cancelled and the seats would remain vacant until 2026 Russian legislative election.

=== Biysk ===
Three-term State Duma member Aleksandr Prokopyev resigned on June 25, 2024, after he was appointed Deputy Chairman of the Government – Minister of Economic Development of the Altai Republic by acting Head Andrey Turchak.

==== Rumoured candidates ====
- Denis Goloborodko (United Russia), Deputy Chairman of the Altai Krai Legislative Assembly (2021–present), Member of the Legislative Assembly (2016–present)
- Sergey Prib (United Russia), Member of Altai Krai Legislative Assembly (2016–present), energy executive
- Artyom Shamkov (United Russia), former Member of Altai Krai Legislative Assembly (2020–2021), businessman, son of former Senator Yury Shamkov
- Vadim Smagin (United Russia), Member of Altai Krai Legislative Assembly (2021–present), brewery owner

=== Skopin ===
First-term State Duma member and former Chairman of the Duma Committee on Health (2021–2023) Dmitry Khubezov resigned on October 8, 2024, after he was appointed Deputy Chairman of the Government – Minister of Health of the Altai Republic by republic Head Andrey Turchak. He became the second 8th State Duma member to step down from the parliament and leave for the Siberian republic after Aleksandr Prokopyev 3 month earlier.

=== Krasnodar ===
First-term State Duma member and former Mayor of Krasnodar Yevgeny Pervyshov resigned on November 4, 2024, after he was appointed acting Head of Tambov Oblast.

==== Rumoured candidates ====
- Sergey Klimov (New People), Member of Severskaya Village Council (2024–present), community activist
- Yury Kostomakha (United Russia), Member of Krasnodar City Duma (2023–present)
- Vadim Kulkov (New People), Member of Timashevsk City Council (2024–present), entrepreneur
- Yevgeny Naumov (United Russia), Mayor of Krasnodar (2022–present)

=== Samara ===
Five-term State Duma member and Chairman of the Duma Committee on Information Policy, Information Technologies and Communications Alexander Khinshtein resigned on December 5, 2024, after he was appointed acting Governor of Kursk Oblast.

=== Magadan ===
First-term State Duma member Anton Basansky resigned on March 4, 2025, after he was appointed State Secretary – Deputy Minister for the Development of the Russian Far East and Arctic.

=== Prokopyevsk ===
Two-term State Duma member Dmitry Islamov resigned March 10, 2025, after he was appointed State Secretary – Deputy Minister of Energy of Russia.

=== Ufa ===
Three-term State Duma member and former Ufa mayor Pavel Kachkayev died unexpectedly May 5, 2025, after suffering a heart attack in his house near Ufa.

=== Engels ===
First-term State Duma member and former Chairman of the Government of Saratov Oblast was announced as new Deputy Chairman of the Government of Saratov Oblast on May 19, 2025, by Governor Roman Busargin.

=== Volzhsky ===
Four-term State Duma member Oleg Savchenko filed paperwork to resign from the Duma on May 20, 2025.
