= Zelenchuksky =

Zelenchuksky (masculine), Zelenchukskaya (feminine), or Zelenchukskoye (neuter) may refer to:

- Zelenchuksky District, a district of the Karachay–Cherkess Republic, Russia
- Zelenchukskaya, a rural locality (stanitsa) in the Karachay–Cherkess Republic, Russia
- Special Astrophysical Observatory of the Russian Academy of Science, sometimes referred to as "Zelenchuksky"
