= Viktoria Abramchenko =

Russian politician (born 1975)

- Виктория Абрамченко
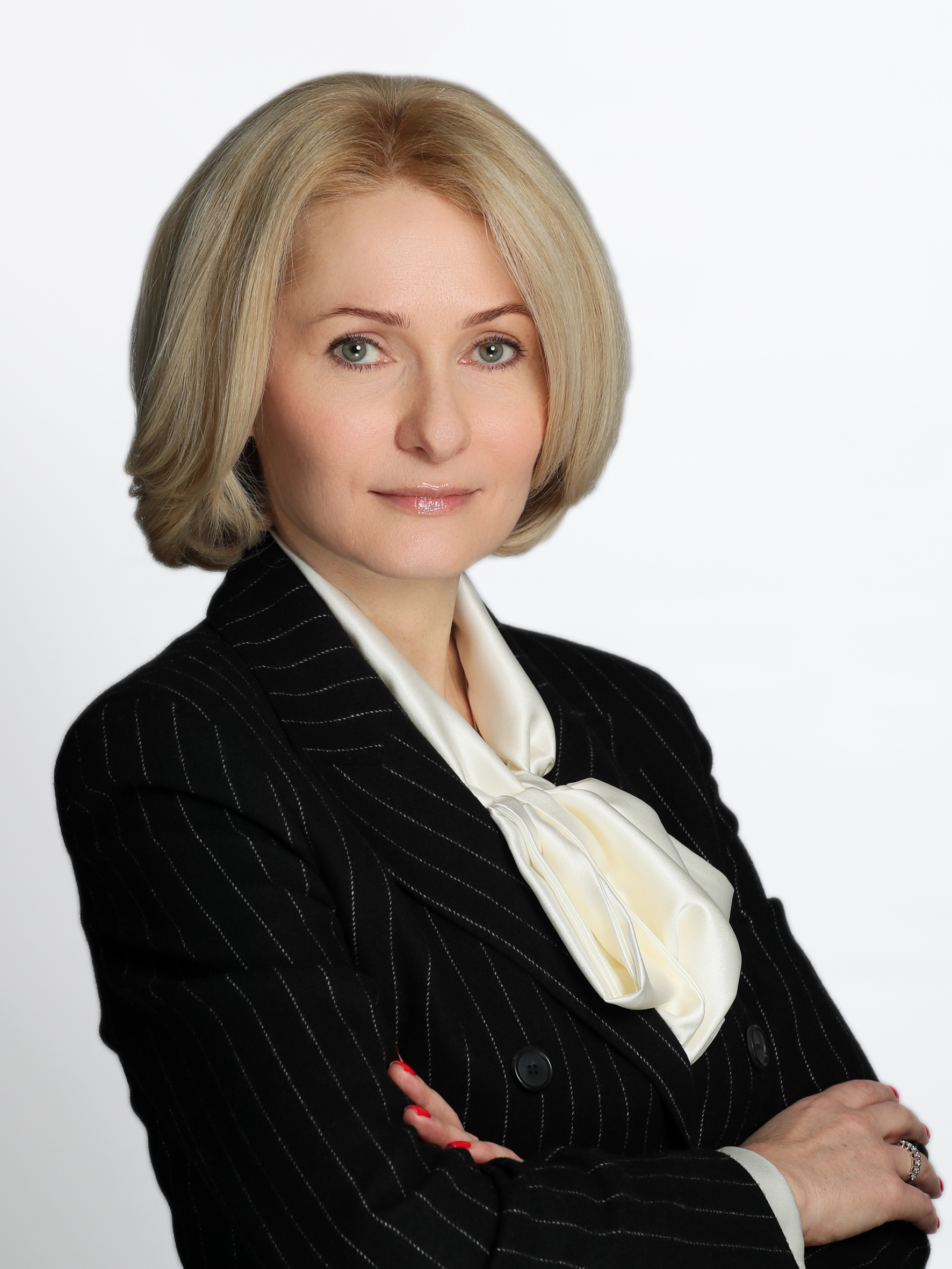
- Official portrait, 2020

Deputy Chairwoman of the State Duma
- Incumbent
- Assumed office 17 September 2024
- Chairman: Vyacheslav Volodin
- Preceded by: Sergey Neverov

Member of State Duma
- Incumbent
- Assumed office 8 September 2024
- Preceded by: Vitaly Kushnarev
- Constituency: Southern (No.152)

Deputy Prime Minister of Russia for Agro-Industrial Complex, Natural Resources and Ecology
- In office 21 January 2020 – 12 May 2024
- Prime Minister: Mikhail Mishustin
- Preceded by: Alexey Gordeyev
- Succeeded by: Dmitry Patrushev

Head of Rosreestr
- In office 11 October 2016 – 21 January 2020
- Prime Minister: Dmitry Medvedev
- Preceded by: Igor Vasilyev
- Succeeded by: Oleg Skufinsky

Personal details
- Born: 22 May 1975 (age 51) Chernogorsk, Khakas AO Krasnoyarsk Krai, Russian SFSR, Soviet Union (now Russia)
- Party: United Russia
- Education: Krasnoyarsk State Agrarian University; RANEPA

Victoria Valeriyevna Abramchenko (Russian: Виктория Валерьевна Абрамченко; born 22 May 1975) is a Russian politician and economist serving as a Deputy Chairwoman of the State Duma since September 2024. She served as Deputy Prime Minister of the Russian Federation with responsibility for Agro-Industrial Complex, Natural Resources and Ecology from January 2020 until May 2024.

== Early life and education ==
Victoria Valeriyevna Abramchenko was born on 22 May 1975, in the city of Chernogorsk, Khakas Autonomous Oblast, Krasnoyarsk Krai, in what was then the Russian Soviet Federative Socialist Republic of the Soviet Union.

In 1998 she graduated from the Institute of Land Management, Cadastres and Environmental Engineering in the structure of the Krasnoyarsk State Agrarian University. In 2004, she graduated from the Russian Academy of Public Administration under the President of the Russian Federation.

== Career ==
Between 1998 and 2000 she worked in the Committee on Land Resources and Land Management of Russia (Roskomzem).

From 2000 to 2001 she was employed by the Federal State Institution "Land Cadastral Chamber".

From 2001 to 2005 she worked in various positions, including as Deputy Head of the Department in Roszemkadastra and Rosnedvizhimost.

Since 2005, she has held various positions in the Ministry of Economic Development of Russia, including the position of Deputy Director of the Real Estate Department of the Ministry of Economic Development of Russia. In 2011, she was appointed Deputy Head of the Federal Service for State Registration, Cadastre and Cartography.

From 2012 to 2015 she was Director of the Department of Land Policy, Property Relations and State Property of the Ministry of Agriculture of the Russian Federation.

From 2015 to 2016, she was Deputy Minister of Agriculture of the Russian Federation.

From 11 October 2016 to 21 January 2020, she was Deputy Minister of Economic Development of the Russian Federation and head of the Federal Service for State Registration, Cadastre and Cartography.

On 21 January 2020, she was appointed to Deputy Prime Minister of the Russian Federation in Mikhail Mishustin's Cabinet. During her tenure as Deputy Prime Minister Abramchenko was in charge of agriculture and agro-industrial complex, fisheries, biotechnology, forestry, natural resources and environment, ecology, as well as Siberian Federal Okrug.

In May 2024 Abramchenko was rumoured to leave the Government of Russia, which was discussed since at least 2023, and potentially appointed Chairwoman of the Accounts Chamber of Russia. Abramchenko eventually was not re-appointed to the Mikhail Mishustin's Second Cabinet and was replaced as Deputy Prime Minister by Minister of Agriculture Dmitry Patrushev.

After her departure from the Government Abramchenko, a Khakassia native, was rumoured to be a consensus candidate between United Russia and CPRF in the upcoming Khakassia constituency by-election to the State Duma. However, Abramchenko was announced as United Russia candidate in the Southern constituency by-election in Rostov Oblast and simultaneously was appointed advisor to Governor of Rostov Oblast Vasily Golubev. Abramchenko won the by-election with 75.73% of the vote.

Even before her election to the State Duma Abramchenko was rumoured to become Deputy Chairwoman of the chamber, the talk intensified after the resignation of Deputy Chairman Sergey Neverov from his position in July 2024. On 16 September 2024, Abramchenko, along with fellow freshmen and former Mikhail Mishustin's Cabinet ministers Oleg Matytsin and Nikolay Shulginov, was unanimously accepted to the United Russia faction in the State Duma. On 17 September 2024, Abramchenko was elected Deputy Chairwoman of the State Duma, replacing Neverov, with 424 votes (Communist Nikolay Kolomeytsev was the only deputy to vote against).

She is a member of the United Russia political party.

== Awards ==
- 2017 — Medal of the Order “For Merit to the Fatherland”, 2nd Class
- 2024 — Order of Honour
- Certificate of Honour of the Government of the Russian Federation
- Certificate of Honour of the Ministry of Economic Development of the Russian Federation
- Commendation from the Minister of Economic Development and Trade of the Russian Federation

== Sanctions ==
In December 2022 the EU sanctioned Viktoria Abramchenko in relation to the 2022 Russian invasion of Ukraine.

== Family ==
Viktoria Abramchenko is legally married and has a son. Her husband, Igor Pogorelov, born in 1962, works at the State Budgetary Institution "Mosgorgeotrest" as an advisor on general affairs. This organization is involved, among other things, in the Moscow Mayor’s Office renovation program. The family was allocated a luxury apartment on preferential terms in the so-called “officials’ nest” on Balchug Island in central Moscow.

== Electoral history ==
=== 2024 ===
Summary of the 6–8 September 2024 by-election in the Southern constituency
Candidate	Party	Votes	%
Viktoria Abramchenko	United Russia	154,908	75.73%
Natalya Oskina	Communist Party	23,069	11.28%
Maksim Fyodorov	A Just Russia – For Truth	9,075	4.44%
Dmitry Velichko	New People	6,827	3.34%
Roman Klimov	Liberal Democratic Party	5,693	2.78%
Aleksandr Yefimov	Yabloko	2,972	1.45%
Total		204,566	100%
