= Kushnarev =

Kushnarev (feminine: Kushnareva), or Kushnaryov (feminine:Kushnaryova), is a Russian and Ukrainian surname (Russian: Кушнарёв, f. Кушнарёва; Ukrainian: Кушнарьов, f. Кушнарьова). Notable people with the surname include:

- Khristofor Kushnaryov (1890–1960), Armenian Soviet composer, musicologist, professor
- Vitaly Kushnarev (born 1975), Russian politician
- Yuri Kushnarev (born 1985), Russian rugby union player
- Yevhen Kushnaryov (1951–2007), Ukrainian politician
