= Soltan Uzdenov =

Russian politician (born 1997)

- Солтан Узденов
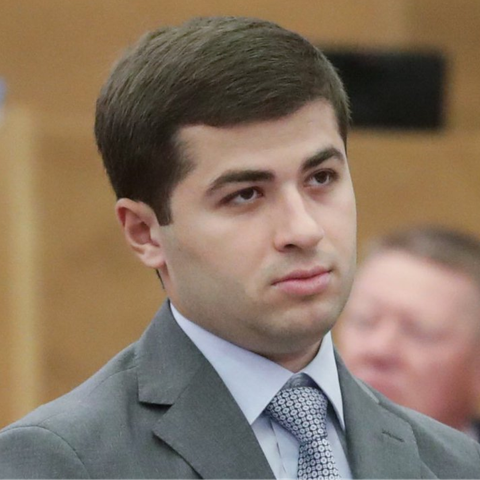
- Uzdenov in 2023

Member of the State Duma
- Incumbent
- Assumed office 10 September 2023
- Preceded by: Dzhasharbek Uzdenov
- Constituency: Karachay-Cherkessia (No. 16)

Personal details
- Born: 9 October 1997 (age 29) Kyzyl-Oktyabr, Zelenchuksky District, Karachay-Cherkessia, Russia
- Party: United Russia
- Parent: Dzhasharbek Uzdenov (father)
- Education: Moscow State University

Soltan Dzhasharbekovich Uzdenov (Russian: Солтан Джашарбекович Узденов; born 9 October 1997) is a Russian politician of the United Russia party.

In September 2023, he was elected to the State Duma in a by-election in Karachay-Cherkessia constituency, replacing his father Dzhasharbek Uzdenov who died in office earlier that year.

In the 2026 Russian legislative election, he was re-elected to his seat with 73.28% of the vote; defeating Communist Party of the Russian Federation candidate Kemal Bytdayev and Liberal Democratic Party candidate Aleksandr Chayka.

== See also ==
- 8th State Duma
- 9th State Duma
