= Dzhasharbek Uzdenov =

Russian politician (1967–2023)

- Джашарбек Узденов
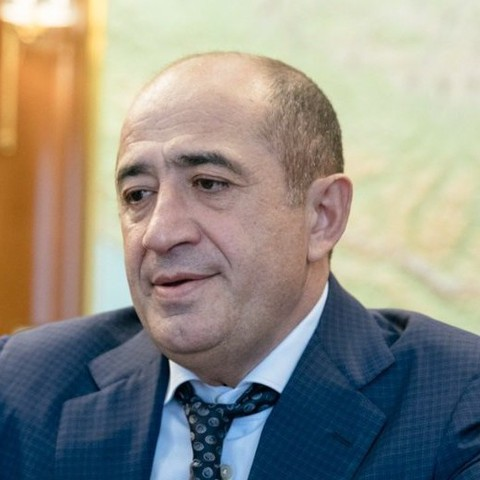

Member of the State Duma for Karachay-Cherkessia
- In office 12 October 2021 – 23 April 2023
- Preceded by: Rasul Botashev
- Succeeded by: Soltan Uzdenov
- Constituency: Karachay-Cherkessia-at-large (No. 16)

Personal details
- Born: 25 January 1967 Kızıl-Oktyabr, Stavropol Krai, RSFSR, USSR
- Died: 23 April 2023 (aged 56)
- Party: United Russia
- Children: Soltan Uzdenov
- Education: Rostov State University of Economics

Dzhasharbek Borisovich Uzdenov (Russian: Джашарбек Борисович Узденов; 25 January 1967 – 23 April 2023) was a Russian politician who served as a deputy in the 8th State Duma.

From 1985 to 1987, Uzdenov served at the Soviet–Afghan War. From 2009 to 2013, he was the deputy of the People's Assembly of Karachay-Cherkessia of the 4th convocation. From 2020 to 2021, Uzdenov was the Minister of Natural Resources and Ecology of Karachay-Cherkessia. In the 2021 Russian legislative election he was elected deputy of the 8th State Duma for the Karachay-Cherkessia constituency.

According to Kommersant, Uzdenov missed all 23 Duma sessions carried out in the autumn of 2021.

Uzdenov died on 23 April 2023, at the age of 56. He was replaced in the State Duma in a by-election by his son Soltan Uzdenov.

== See also ==
- List of members of the State Duma of Russia who died in office
