= Novocherkassk constituency =

Russian legislative constituency

Novocherkassk single-member constituency
- Constituency of the Russian State Duma
- Deputy: Sergey Medvedev; United Russia
- Federal subject: Rostov Oblast
- Districts: Aksaysky, Bagayevsky, Novocherkassk, Rostov-on-Don (Pervomaysky, Voroshilovsky)
- Voters: 524,143 (2026)

The Novocherkassk constituency (No.153 (Note: Rostov-Pervomaysky constituency No.144 in 1993-1995, Proletarsky constituency No.145 in 1995-2007, Southern constituency No.152 in 2016–2026)) is a Russian legislative constituency in Rostov Oblast. The constituency covers north-eastern Rostov-on-Don, major industrial city Novocherkassk as well as suburbs and exurbs between them.

The constituency has been represented since the 2026 by United Russia deputy Sergey Medvedev, former United Aircraft Corporation executive, who won the open seat after one-term United Russia incumbent Viktoria Abramchenko successfully sought re-election on the party list.

== Boundaries ==
1993–1995 Rostov-Pervomaysky constituency: Rostov-on-Don (Kirovsky, Leninsky, Pervomaysky, Proletarsky, Voroshilovsky, Zheleznodorozhny)
The constituency covered central and eastern Rostov-on-Don, including the city centre.

1995–2007 Proletarsky constituency: Aksaysky District, Bataysk, Rostov-on-Don (Pervomaysky, Proletarsky, Voroshilovsky)
After the 1995 redistricting Rostov Oblast gained the seventh constituency, so all other districts were redrawn. The constituency was renamed as "Proletarsky constituency" and retained only eastern Rostov-on-Don, losing the rest of the city to Rostov constituency. This seat instead gained suburban Aksaysky District to its east from Taganrog constituency as well satellite city Bataysk to the south from Rostov-Sovetsky constituency.

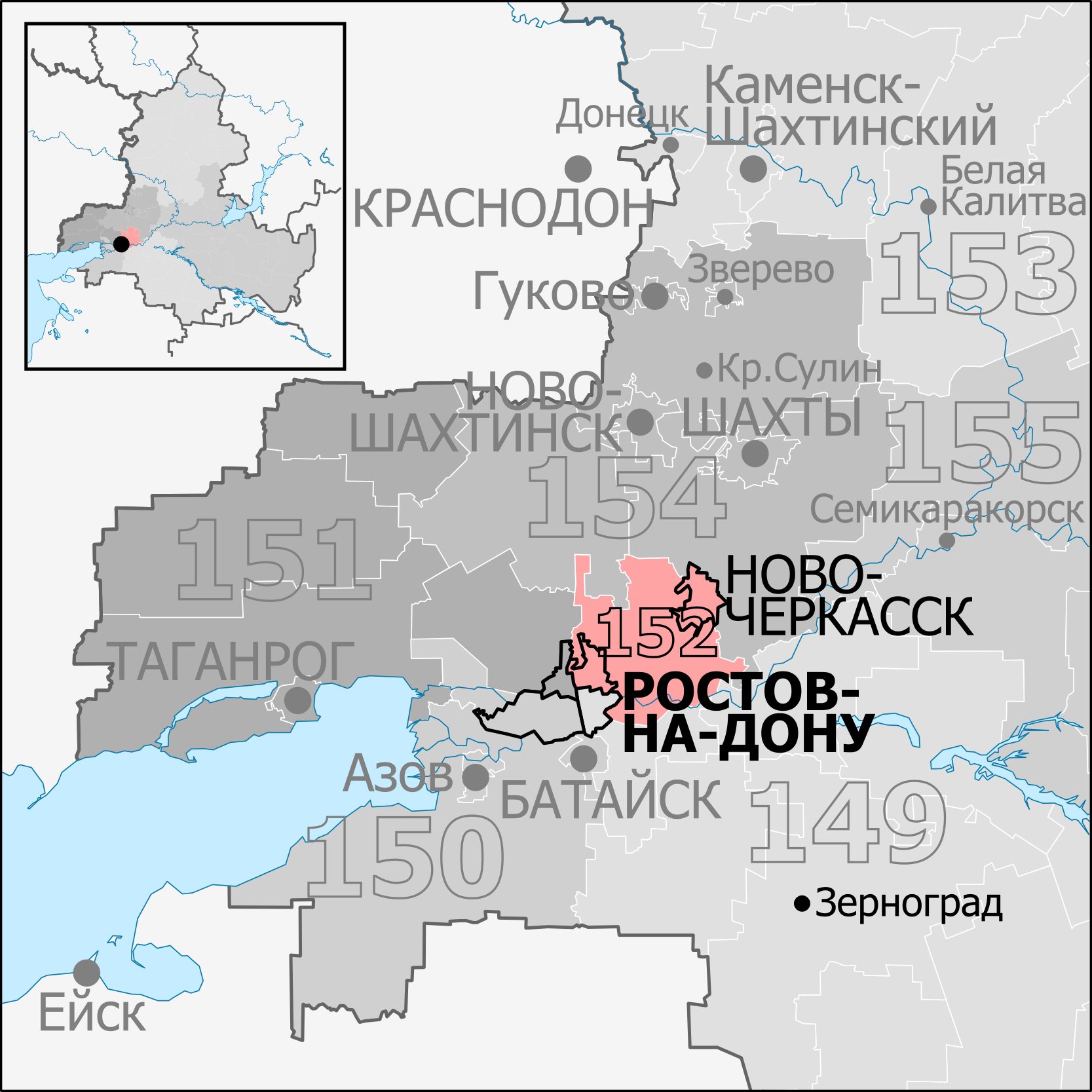
Constituency boundaries from 2016 to 2026

2016–2026 Southern constituency: Aksaysky District (Aksay, Bolshelogskoye, Grushevskoye, Mishkinskoye, Rassvetovskoye, Shchepkinskoye, Starocherkasskoye), Novocherkassk, Rostov-on-Don (Pervomaysky, Voroshilovsky)
The constituency was re-created for the 2016 election under the name "Southern constituency" and retained most of its territory, losing Proletarsky City District and southern Aksaysky District to Rostov constituency, and Bataysk – to new Nizhnedonskoy constituency. This seat instead gained industrial city Novocherkassk from the former Belaya Kalitva constituency.

2026–present: Aksaysky District, Bagayevsky District, Novocherkassk, Rostov-on-Don (Pervomaysky, Voroshilovsky)
Following the 2025 redistricting Rostov Oblast lost one of its seven constituencies, so all the remaining seats saw major changes. The constituency took the name "Novocherkassk constituency" and retained all of its former territory, gaining the rest of Aksaysky District and Bagayevsky District from Rostov constituency.

== Members elected ==
| Election | Member | Party |
|---|---|---|
| 1993 | Alla Amelina | Independent |
| 1995 | Sergey Shakhray (Note: appointed Plenipotentiary Representative of President of Russia to the Constitutional Court in December 1996) | Party of Russian Unity and Accord |
| 1997 | Nikolay Kolomeytsev | Independent |
| 1999 | Nikolay Kolomeytsev | Communist Party |
| 2003 | Zoya Stepanova | Independent |
| 2007 | Proportional representation - no election by constituency | |
| 2011 | Proportional representation - no election by constituency | |
| 2016 | Mikhail Chernyshyov | United Russia |
| 2021 | Vitaly Kushnarev (Note: appointed Deputy Governor of Rostov Oblast – Minister of Transport of Rostov Oblast in May 2024) | United Russia |
| 2024 | Viktoria Abramchenko | United Russia |
| 2026 | Sergey Medvedev | United Russia |

== Election results ==
=== 1993 ===
Summary of the 12 December 1993 Russian legislative election in the Rostov-Pervomaysky constituency
| Candidate | Party | Votes | % |
|---|---|---|---|
| Alla Amelina | Independent | 61,168 | 22.79% |
| Aleksandr Mayboroda | Yavlinsky–Boldyrev–Lukin | 25,413 | 9.47% |
| Vitaly Linnik | Independent | 22,361 | 8.33% |
| Aleksandr Chernenko | Independent | 17,329 | 6.46% |
| Igor Rozhkov | Independent | 17,308 | 6.45% |
| Vladimir Vukolev | Independent | 16,891 | 6.29% |
| Sergey Zbrailov | Independent | 15,162 | 5.65% |
| Viktor Povalyayev | Communist Party | 14,927 | 5.56% |
| Natalya Serdyukova | Future of Russia–New Names | 8,178 | 3.05% |
| Boris Sturov | Independent | 3,855 | 1.44% |
| against all | | 46,586 | 17.35% |
| Total | | 268,451 | 100% |

=== 1995 ===
Summary of the 17 December 1995 Russian legislative election in the Proletarsky constituency
| Candidate | Party | Votes | % |
|---|---|---|---|
| Sergey Shakhray | Party of Russian Unity and Accord | 87,036 | 27.91% |
| Nikolay Kolomeytsev | Communist Party | 61,305 | 19.67% |
| Alla Amelina (incumbent) | Democratic Choice of Russia – United Democrats | 28,656 | 9.19% |
| Viktor Petrov | Congress of Russian Communities | 13,807 | 4.43% |
| Vladimir Titarenko | Derzhava | 10,679 | 3.43% |
| Valentin Khmelevsky | Communists and Working Russia - for the Soviet Union | 10,387 | 3.33% |
| Valentin Gerbach | Independent | 9,684 | 3.11% |
| Anatoly Ryzhakov | Party of Workers' Self-Government | 8,879 | 2.85% |
| Viktor Gorbatko | Power to the People | 8,806 | 2.83% |
| Aleksandr Grinberg | Liberal Democratic Party | 8,513 | 2.73% |
| Anatoly Smirnov | Independent | 7,591 | 2.44% |
| Vladimir Vukolov | Independent | 5,325 | 1.71% |
| Aleksandr Nikolayev | Independent | 3,778 | 1.21% |
| Boris Sturov | Russian Party | 2,083 | 0.67% |
| Raisa Grishechkina | Democratic Alternative | 1,832 | 0.59% |
| Sergey Gorshkov | Independent | 1,423 | 0.46% |
| Gennady Eskin | Frontier Generation | 880 | 0.28% |
| against all | | 31,816 | 10.21% |
| Total | | 311,666 | 100% |

=== 1997 ===
Summary of the 1 June 1997 by-election in the Proletarsky constituency
| Candidate | Party | Votes | % |
|---|---|---|---|
| Nikolay Kolomeytsev | Independent | 60,457 | 39.50% |
| Gennady Melikyan | Independent | 28,695 | 18.75% |
| Anatoly Stankov | Independent | 11,679 | 7.63% |
| Boris Grinberg | Independent | 6,258 | 4.09% |
| Sergey Sleptsov | Independent | 4,441 | 2.90% |
| Erlen Yemelyanov | Independent | 2,412 | 1.58% |
| Igor Lyubitsky | Independent | 2,365 | 1.55% |
| Albert Taranenko | Independent | 2,248 | 1.47% |
| Vladimir Dek | Independent | 2,199 | 1.44% |
| Aleksandr Ivanov | Independent | 1,952 | 1.28% |
| Sergey Apatenko | Independent | 1,824 | 1.19% |
| Aleksandr Kasyanov | Independent | 1,632 | 1.07% |
| Gennady Shupikov | Independent | 1,555 | 1.02% |
| Igor Rozhkov | Independent | 1,520 | 0.99% |
| against all | | 16,518 | 10.79% |
| Total | | 153,070 | 100% |

=== 1999 ===
Summary of the 19 December 1999 Russian legislative election in the Proletarsky constituency
| Candidate | Party | Votes | % |
|---|---|---|---|
| Nikolay Kolomeytsev (incumbent) | Communist Party | 139,218 | 44.19% |
| Yury Vertiy | Independent | 87,673 | 27.83% |
| Konstantin Denisenko | Andrei Nikolayev and Svyatoslav Fyodorov Bloc | 16,711 | 5.30% |
| Eduard Kaporikov | Spiritual Heritage | 6,741 | 2.14% |
| against all | | 57,334 | 18.20% |
| Total | | 315,014 | 100% |

=== 2003 ===
Summary of the 7 December 2003 Russian legislative election in the Proletarsky constituency
| Candidate | Party | Votes | % |
|---|---|---|---|
| Zoya Stepanova | Independent | 88,589 | 32.09% |
| Nikolay Kolomeytsev (incumbent) | Communist Party | 85,088 | 30.82% |
| Vladimir Shcherbakov | Independent | 53,306 | 19.31% |
| Viktor Alekhin | Independent | 7,541 | 2.73% |
| against all | | 34,075 | 12.34% |
| Total | | 276,517 | 100% |

=== 2016 ===
Summary of the 18 September 2016 Russian legislative election in the Southern constituency
| Candidate | Party | Votes | % |
|---|---|---|---|
| Mikhail Chernyshyov | United Russia | 103,751 | 48.59% |
| Vladimir Bessonov | Communist Party | 39,750 | 18.62% |
| Yegor Kolesnikov | Liberal Democratic Party | 21,172 | 9.92% |
| Gennady Zubov | Rodina | 11,230 | 5.26% |
| Aleksey Lyashchenko | A Just Russia | 10,373 | 4.86% |
| Andrey Kutyrev | Independent | 5,007 | 2.35% |
| Vakhtang Kozayev | Communists of Russia | 3,858 | 1.81% |
| Vladimir Ignatkin | Yabloko | 3,690 | 1.73% |
| Vladimir Bazarov | Patriots of Russia | 3,093 | 1.45% |
| Tatyana Cherepanova | Civic Platform | 3,006 | 1.41% |
| Stanislav Avramenko | People's Freedom Party | 2,931 | 1.37% |
| Total | | 213,507 | 100% |

=== 2021 ===
Summary of the 17-19 September 2021 Russian legislative election in the Southern constituency
| Candidate | Party | Votes | % |
|---|---|---|---|
| Vitaly Kushnarev | United Russia | 70,682 | 37.08% |
| Andrey Kutyrev | Communist Party | 50,059 | 26.26% |
| Aleksandr Khurudzhi | New People | 21,430 | 11.24% |
| Boris Valter | A Just Russia — For Truth | 18,591 | 9.75% |
| Denis Karasev | Liberal Democratic Party | 14,107 | 7.40% |
| Nikolay Larin | The Greens | 5,561 | 2.92% |
| Kirill Surenko | Party of Growth | 2,964 | 1.56% |
| Total | | 190,606 | 100% |

=== 2024 ===
Summary of the 6–8 September 2024 by-election in the Southern constituency
| Candidate | Party | Votes | % |
|---|---|---|---|
| Viktoria Abramchenko | United Russia | 154,908 | 75.73% |
| Natalya Oskina | Communist Party | 23,069 | 11.28% |
| Maksim Fyodorov | A Just Russia – For Truth | 9,075 | 4.44% |
| Dmitry Velichko | New People | 6,827 | 3.34% |
| Roman Klimov | Liberal Democratic Party | 5,693 | 2.78% |
| Aleksandr Yefimov | Yabloko | 2,972 | 1.45% |
| Total | | 204,566 | 100% |

=== 2026 ===
Summary of the 18-20 September 2026 Russian legislative election in the Novocherkassk constituency
| Candidate | Party | Votes | % |
|---|---|---|---|
| Sergey Medvedev | United Russia | 215,030 | 60.32% |
| Evgeny Bessonov | Communist Party | 56,228 | 15.77% |
| Lyubov Rumyantseva | Liberal Democratic Party | 29,687 | 8.33% |
| German Zaporozhchenko | New People | 28,518 | 8.00% |
| Maksim Fyodorov | A Just Russia | 15,206 | 4.27% |
| Oleg Kobyakov | Communists of Russia | 8,639 | 2.42% |
| Total | | 356,496 | 100% |
