= Zelenchukskaya =

Human settlement in Zelenchuksky District, Karachay-Cherkess Republic, Russia

Coordinates: 43°51′N 41°36′E

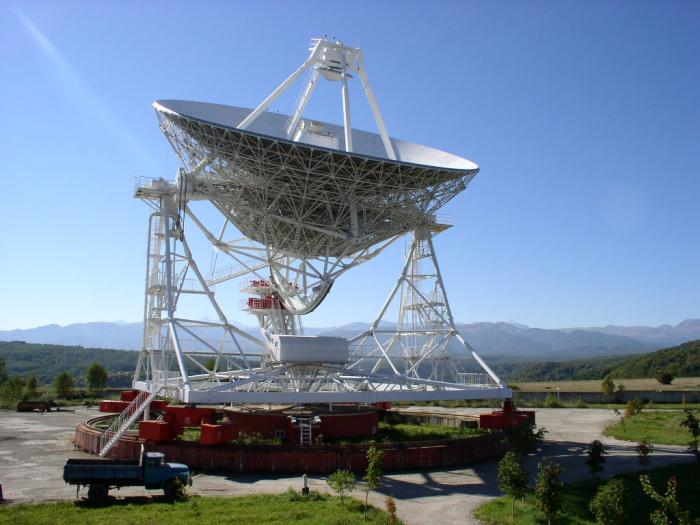
RT-32 radio telescope in Zelenchukskaya

Zelenchukskaya (Russian: Зеленчу́кская; Karachay-Balkar: Зеленчук, Джаланджюк, romanized: Zelençuk, Calancük, Abaza: Зеленчыкв, Зеленчукская, Nogai: Зеленчукский, romanized: Zelençukskiy) is a rural locality (a stanitsa) and the administrative center of Zelenchuksky District of the Karachay–Cherkess Republic, Russia, located on the Bolshoy Zelenchuk River.

== Rural locality ==
Population: 19,449 (2010 census); 21,025 (2002 census); 20,455 (1989 Soviet census). In terms of population, it is the most populous rural locality in the republic.

The Special Astrophysical Observatory of the Russian Academy of Science is located to the south of the stanitsa.

== History ==
The stanitsa was founded on May 1, 1859 and named after the river on which it stands. On December 8-9, 1942, approximately 180 Jews were murdered in a mass execution perpetrated by German troops in a trench dug 2-3 km out of the village.

== Demographics ==
In 2002, the population included:

- Russians (77.1%)
- Karachays (17.4%)
- all other ethnicities comprising less than 1% of population each

== Climate ==
Zelenchukskaya has a warm-summer humid continental climate (Köppen climate classification: Dfb) with moderately warm and very humid summers and cold, dry winters.

Climate data for Zelenchukskaya (Зеленчукская)
Month	Jan	Feb	Mar	Apr	May	Jun	Jul	Aug	Sep	Oct	Nov	Dec	Year
Mean daily maximum °C (°F)	3.9 (39.0)	5.1 (41.2)	9.5 (49.1)	15.3 (59.5)	19.6 (67.3)	22.5 (72.5)	25.0 (77.0)	24.8 (76.6)	21.0 (69.8)	16.3 (61.3)	10.9 (51.6)	5.9 (42.6)	15.0 (59.0)
Mean daily minimum °C (°F)	−9.0 (15.8)	−7.9 (17.8)	−3.4 (25.9)	2.1 (35.8)	6.2 (43.2)	9.2 (48.6)	11.7 (53.1)	10.9 (51.6)	6.8 (44.2)	2.1 (35.8)	−2.4 (27.7)	−6.4 (20.5)	1.7 (35.0)
Average precipitation mm (inches)	17 (0.7)	16 (0.6)	31 (1.2)	68 (2.7)	102 (4.0)	139 (5.5)	111 (4.4)	95 (3.7)	65 (2.6)	40 (1.6)	28 (1.1)	21 (0.8)	733 (28.9)
Mean monthly sunshine hours	125	141	161	169	211	216	251	250	205	168	137	110	2,144
Source: Climatebase.ru
