= Nikolay Kolomeitsev =

Russian politician

Nikolay Kolomeitsev MP
- Николай Коломейцев
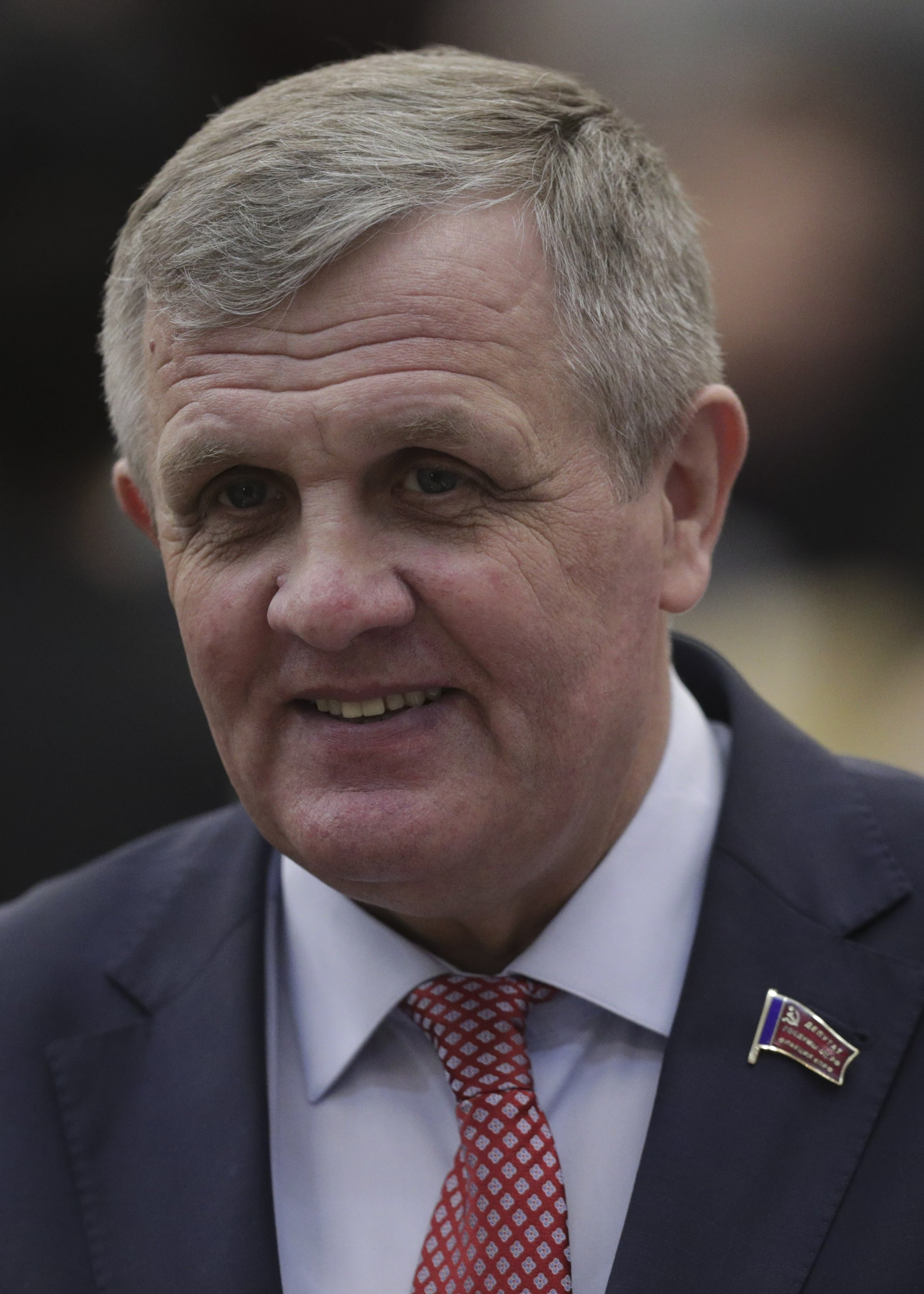

Member of the State Duma (Party List Seat)
- Incumbent
- Assumed office 24 December 2007
- In office 18 January 2000 – 29 December 2003

Member of the State Duma for Rostov Oblast
- In office 17 January 1996 – 18 January 2000
- Preceded by: Sergey Shakhray
- Succeeded by: Zoya Stepanova
- Constituency: Proletarsky (No. 145)

Personal details
- Born: 1 September 1956 (age 69) Protsikov, Vesyolovsky District, Rostov Oblast, Russian SFSR, USSR
- Party: CPRF
- Education: Rostov-on-Don Institute of Agricultural Engineering; Russian Academy of National Economy

Nikolay Vasilyevich Kolomeitsev (Russian: Николай Васильевич Коломейцев; born 1 September 1956) is a Russian political figure and a deputy of the 2nd, 3rd, 5th, 6th, 7th, and 8th State Dumas.

In the 1980s-1990s, he was an instructor in the industrial and transport and socio-economic departments of the Rostov City Committee of the Communist Party of the Soviet Union. From 1994 to 1997, he was the deputy of the Legislative Assembly of the Rostov Oblast. From 1997 to 1999, he was the deputy of the 2nd State Duma. From 1999 to 2003, he was the deputy of the 3rd State Duma. In 2007, he was re-elected for the 5th State Duma. On March 2, 2008, he was elected to the Legislative Assembly of the Rostov Oblast of the 4th convocation. From 2011 to 2016, he was the deputy of the 6th State Duma. In 2016 and 2021, he was elected deputy for the 7th and 8th State Dumas, respectively.

== Legislative Activity ==
From 1995 to 2019, during his tenure as a deputy of the State Duma of the II, III, V, VI, and VII convocations, he served as a co-author of 184 legislative initiatives and amendments to draft federal laws.

== Awards ==
- Commendation of the President of the Russian Federation (12 June 2013) — for a significant contribution to the development of Russian parliamentarism and active legislative activity.
- Commendation of the Government of the Russian Federation (20 July 2019) — for a significant contribution to the development of Russian parliamentarism and active legislative activity.
