= Erken-Shakhar =

Rural locality in Karachay-Cherkessia, Russia

Coordinates: 44°22′26″N 41°57′19″E

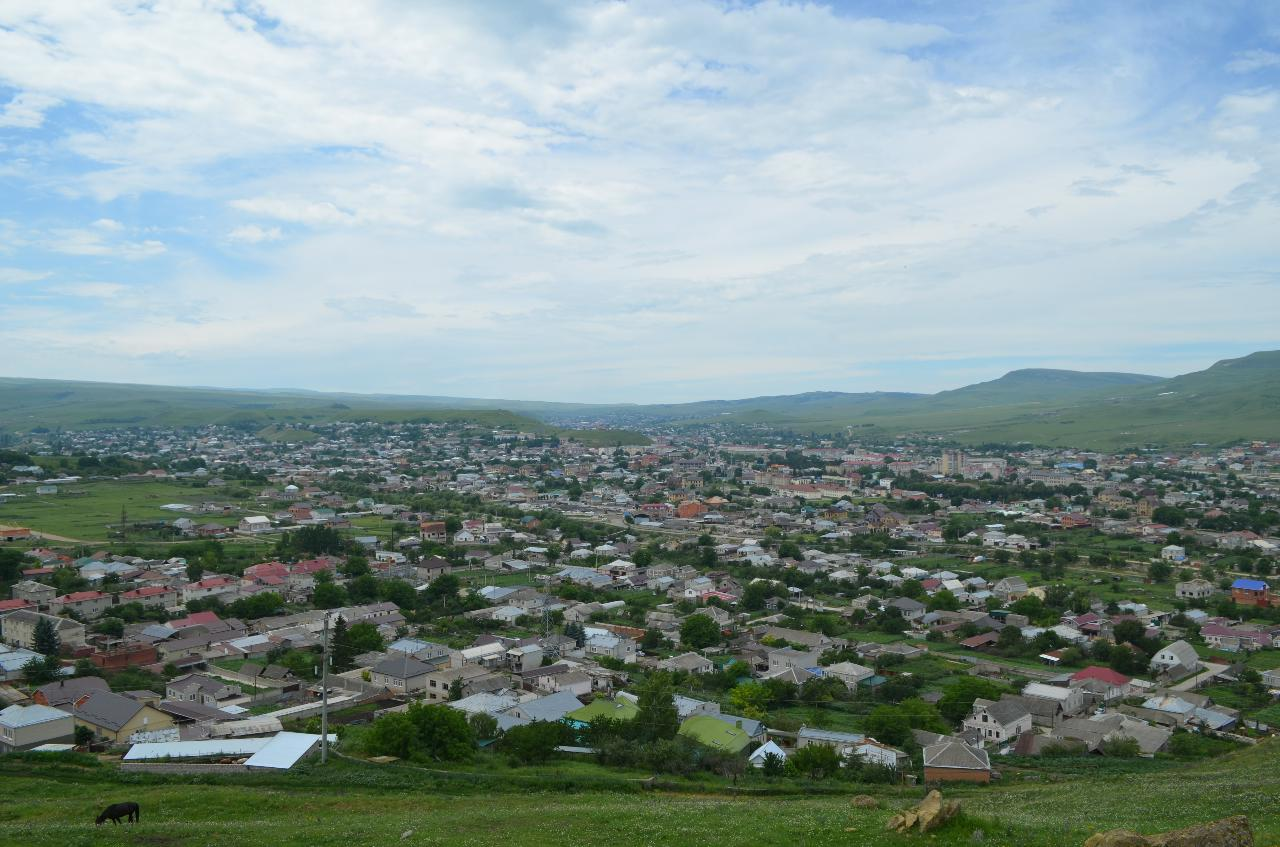

Erken-Shakhar (Russian: Эркен-Шахар, Nogai: Эркин-Шахар, Erkin-Şaxar) is a rural locality (a settlement) and the administrative center of Nogaysky District of the Karachay-Cherkess Republic, Russia. Population: 4,184 (2010 census); 4,152 (2002 census); 4,974 (1989 Soviet census).
