= Nogaysky District, Karachay-Cherkess Republic =

Nogaysky District Ногайский район (Russian)
- District

Other transcription(s)
  - Nogay: Ногай районы
  - Kabardian: Нэгъуей куей
  - Karachay-Balkar: Ногъай район
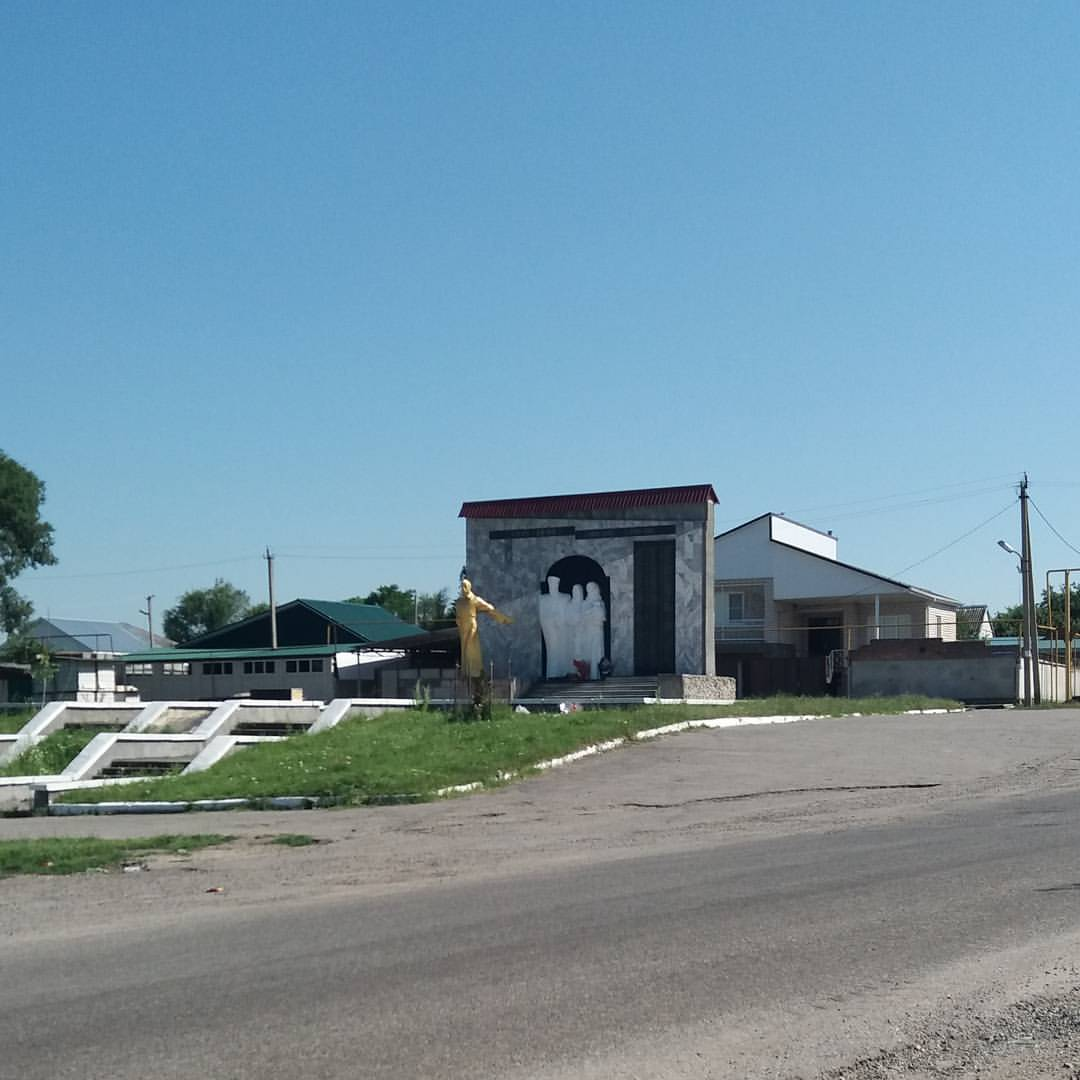
- Street scene in Nogasky District

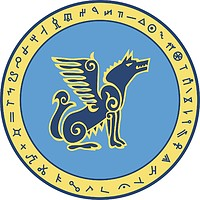
- Coat of arms
- Location of Nogaysky District in the Karachay-Cherkess Republic
- Coordinates: 44°22′N 41°57′E
- Country: Russia
- Federal subject: Karachay-Cherkess Republic
- Established: 2007
- Administrative center: Erken-Shakhar

Area
  - Total: 202 km^{2} (78 sq mi)

Population (2010 Census)
  - Total: 15,659
  - Density: 77.5/km^{2} (201/sq mi)
  - Urban: 0%
  - Rural: 100%

Administrative structure
  - Inhabited localities: 8 rural localities

Municipal structure
  - Municipally incorporated as: Nogaysky Municipal District
  - Municipal divisions: 0 urban settlements, 5 rural settlements
- Time zone: UTC+3 (MSK)
- OKTMO ID: 91623000
- Website: http://noghay-rayon.ru

Nogaysky District (Russian: Нога́йский райо́н; Nogay: Ногай районы, Noğay rayonı; Kabardian: Нэгъуей куей; Karachay-Balkar: Ногъай район, Noğay rayon) is an administrative and a municipal district (raion), one of the ten in the Karachay-Cherkess Republic, Russia. It is located in the north of the republic. The area of the district is 202 square kilometers (78 sq mi). Its administrative center is the rural locality (a settlement) of Erken-Shakhar. As of the 2010 Census, the total population of the district was 15,659, with the population of Erken-Shakhar accounting for 26.7% of that number.

== History ==
The district was established in 2007.

== Administrative and municipal status ==
Within the framework of administrative divisions, Nogaysky District is one of the ten in the Karachay-Cherkess Republic and has administrative jurisdiction over all of its eight rural localities. As a municipal division, the district is incorporated as Nogaysky Municipal District. Its eight rural localities are incorporated into five rural settlements within the municipal district. The settlement of Erken-Shakhar serves as the administrative center of both the administrative and municipal district.
