= Vitaly Kushnarev =

Russian politician

- Виталий Кушнарёв
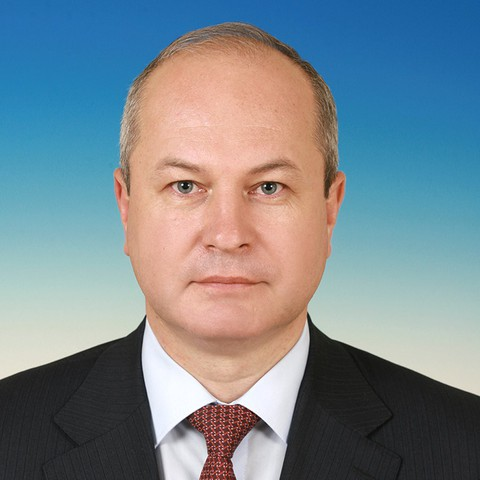
- official portrait, circa 2021

Member of the State Duma for Rostov Oblast
- Incumbent
- Assumed office 12 October 2021
- Preceded by: Mikhail Chernyshyov
- Constituency: Southern Rostov (No. 152)

Head of administration, Rostov-on-Don
- In office 2016–2019

Personal details
- Born: 1 May 1975 (age 51) Mikhailov, Tatsinsky District, Rostov Oblast, RSFSR, USSR
- Party: United Russia
- Education: South Russian State Polytechnic University

Vitaly Vasilievich Kushnarev (Russian: Виталий Васильевич Кушнарёв; 1 May 1975, Mikhailov, Tatsinsky District) is a Russian political figure and deputy of the 8th State Duma.

From 1998 to 2003, Kushnarev was the chief specialist on restructuring the coal industry and, later, head of the investment Group at the administration of Belaya Kalitva. In 2004-2010, he headed the coal industry restructuring department, then the industry and construction department in the administration of the Belokalitvinsky District. He left the post to become the assistant to the governor of the Rostov Oblast Vasily Golubev. In 2014, he was appointed Minister of Transport of the Rostov Oblast. From 2016 to 2019, Kushnarev headed the administration of Rostov-on-Don. Since September 2021, he has served as deputy of the 8th State Duma.

== Sanctions ==
He was sanctioned by Canada under the Special Economic Measures Act (S.C. 1992, c. 17) in relation to the Russian invasion of Ukraine for Grave Breach of International Peace and Security, and by the UK government in 2022 in relation to Russo-Ukrainian War.
