= Zelenchuksky District =

Zelenchuksky District Зеленчукский район (Russian)
- District

Other transcription(s)
  - Karachay-Balkar: Зеленчук район
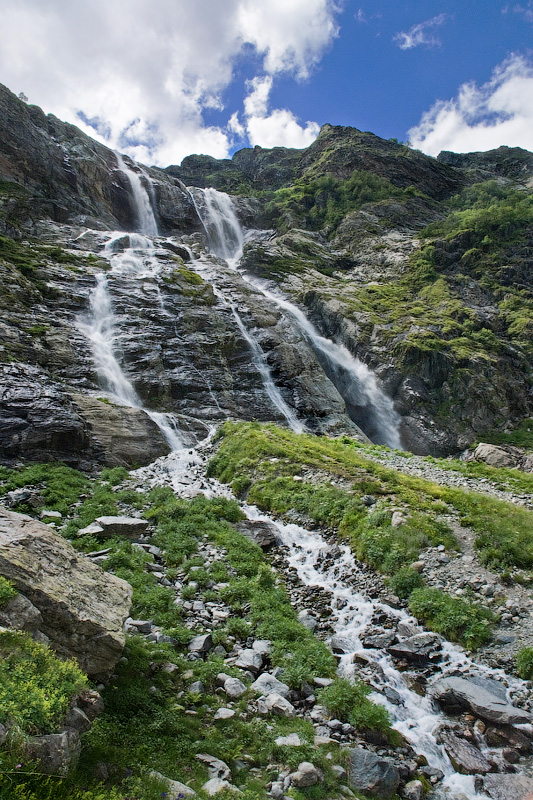
- A waterfall near the selo of Arkhyz in Zelenchuksky District

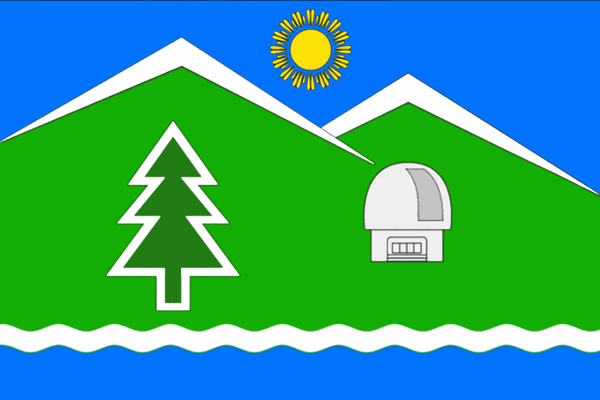
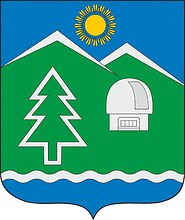
- Flag Coat of arms
- Location of Zelenchuksky District in the Karachay-Cherkess Republic
- Coordinates: 43°51′N 41°36′E
- Country: Russia
- Federal subject: Karachay-Cherkess Republic
- Established: 1922
- Administrative center: Zelenchukskaya

Area
  - Total: 2,931 km^{2} (1,132 sq mi)

Population (2010 Census)
  - Total: 51,780
  - Density: 17.67/km^{2} (45.76/sq mi)
  - Urban: 0%
  - Rural: 100%

Administrative structure
  - Inhabited localities: 17 rural localities

Municipal structure
  - Municipally incorporated as: Zelenchuksky Municipal District
  - Municipal divisions: 0 urban settlements, 9 rural settlements
- Time zone: UTC+3 (MSK)
- OKTMO ID: 91610000
- Website: http://zelenchukadmin.ru

Population of Zelenchuksky District
- 2010 Census: 51,780
- 2002 Census: 53,414
- 1989 Census: 52,692
- 1979 Census: 51,865

Zelenchuksky District (Russian: Зеленчу́кский райо́н; Karachay-Balkar: Зеленчук район, Zelençuk rayon) is an administrative and municipal district (raion), one of the ten in the Karachay-Cherkess Republic, Russia. It is located in the western central part of the republic. The area of the district is 2,931 square kilometers (1,132 sq mi). Its administrative center is the rural locality (a stanitsa) of Zelenchukskaya. As of the 2010 Census, the total population of the district was 51,780, with the population of Zelenchukskaya accounting for 37.6% of that number.

== Administrative and municipal status ==
Within the framework of administrative divisions, Zelenchuksky District is one of the ten in the Karachay-Cherkess Republic and has administrative jurisdiction over all of its seventeen rural localities. As a municipal division, the district is incorporated as Zelenchuksky Municipal District. Its seventeen rural localities are incorporated into nine rural settlements within the municipal district. The stanitsa of Zelenchukskaya serves as the administrative center of both the administrative and municipal district.
