= People's Assembly of Karachay-Cherkessia =

Regional parliament of Karachay-Cherkessia, Russia

People's Assembly of Karachay-Cherkessia Народное собрание Карачаево-Черкесской Республики
- 7th legislature

Type
- Type: Unicameral

Leadership
- Chairman: Alexander Ivanov, United Russia since 11 February 2010

Structure
- Seats: 50
- Political groups: United Russia (34); CPRF (6); SRZP (6); Civic Platform (2); LDPR (2)

Elections
- Last election: 8 September 2024
- Next election: 2029

Meeting place
- 54 Krasnoarmeyskaya Street, Cherkessk

Website
- http://parlament09.ru

The People's Assembly (Parliament) of the Karachay-Cherkess Republic (Russian: Народное Собрание (Парламент) Карачаево-Черкесской Республики, romanized: Narodnoye Sobraniye (Parlament) Karachayevo-Cherkesskoy Respubliki) is the regional parliament of Karachay-Cherkessia, a federal subject of Russia. It consists of 50 deputies who are elected for five-year terms.

== Overview ==
The deputies are elected on the basis of universal and direct suffrage by secret ballot.

The Chairman of the Government (prime minister) is appointed by the Head of Karachay-Cherkessia with the consent of the People's Assembly.

The presiding officer is the Chairman of the People's Assembly of Karachay–Cherkessia.

== Elections ==
=== 2019 ===
Party	%	Seats
United Russia	65.04	34
Communist Party of the Russian Federation	12.17	6
A Just Russia	6.19	3
Patriots of Russia	5.93	3
Civic Platform	5.13	2
Liberal Democratic Party of Russia	5.04	2
Registered voters/turnout	68.07	

=== 2024 ===
Party	%	Seats
United Russia	65.14	34
Communist Party of the Russian Federation	12.74	6
A Just Russia	11.80	6
Liberal Democratic Party of Russia	5.11	2
Civic Platform	5.05	2
Registered voters/turnout	69.07	

== Chairmen ==
=== Supreme Soviet ===
Name	Entered office	Left office
Vladimir Khubiyev	1990	June 13, 1992
?	1992	1995

=== People's Assembly of Karachay–Cherkessia ===
Name	Entered/left office
Igor Ivanov	1995–1999
Janibek Sunuyov	1999–2004
Sergey Smorodin	2004–2008
Zurab Dokshokov	2008–2009
Alexander Ivanov	2009–Present

== Sources ==
- Kommersant - Russian Daily Online
