= Novaya Kosa =

Novaya Kosa Новая Коса Янъы-Атав
- Selo
- Location within Republic of Dagestan Location within Russia
- Coordinates: 43°33′N 47°21′E
- Country: Russia
- Region: Republic of Dagestan
- District: Babayurtovsky District
- Time zone: UTC+3:00

Novaya Kosa (Russian: Новая Коса; Nogai: Янъы-Атав, Yañı-Atav) is a rural locality (a selo) and the administrative centre of Novokosinsky Selsoviet, Babayurtovsky District, Republic of Dagestan, Russia. The population was 664 as of 2010. There are 6 streets.

== Geography ==
Novaya Kosa is located 53 km east of Babayurt (the district's administrative centre) by road. Babayurt is the nearest rural locality.
