= Gemetyube =

Gemetyube Геметюбе Кеме-Тоьбе
- Selo
- Location within Republic of Dagestan Location within Russia
- Coordinates: 43°34′N 46°54′E
- Country: Russia
- Region: Republic of Dagestan
- District: Babayurtovsky District
- Time zone: UTC+3:00

Gemetyube (Russian: Геметюбе; Nogai: Кеме-Тоьбе, Keme-Töbe) is a rural locality (a selo) in Gemetyubinsky Selsoviet, Babayurtovsky District, Republic of Dagestan, Russia. The population was 1,516 as of 2010. There are 12 streets. Selo was founded in 1862.

== Geography ==
Gemetyube is located 13 km southeast of Babayurt (the district's administrative centre) by road. Tatayurt is the nearest rural locality.
