= Alimpashayurt =

Alimpashayurt Алимпашаюрт Алимпаша-юрт Аьлимпаша-юрт
- Selo
- Location within Republic of Dagestan Location within Russia
- Coordinates: 43°35′N 46°49′E
- Country: Russia
- Region: Republic of Dagestan
- District: Babayurtovsky District
- Time zone: UTC+3:00

Alimpashayurt (Russian: Алимпашаюрт; Kumyk: Алимпаша-юрт, romanized: Alimpaşa-yurt; Nogai: Аьлимпаша-юрт, romanized: Əlimpaşa-yurt) is a rural locality (a selo) in Gemetyubinsky Selsoviet, Babayurtovsky District, Republic of Dagestan, Russia. The population was 693 as of 2010. There are 13 streets.

== Geography ==
Alimpashayurt is located 6 km southeast of Babayurt (the district's administrative centre) by road. Babayurt is the nearest rural locality.
