= Yangylbay =

Yangylbay Янгылбай Янъылбай
- Selo
- Location within Republic of Dagestan Location within Russia
- Coordinates: 43°37′N 46°56′E
- Country: Russia
- Region: Republic of Dagestan
- District: Babayurtovsky District
- Time zone: UTC+3:00

Yangylbay (Russian: Янгылбай; Nogai: Янъылбай, Yañılbay) is a rural locality (a selo) in Muzhukaysky Selsoviet, Babayurtovsky District, Republic of Dagestan, Russia. The population was 153 as of 2010. There are 2 streets.

== Geography ==
Yangylbay is located 15 km northeast of Babayurt (the district's administrative centre) by road. Muzhukay is the nearest rural locality.
