= Tamazatyube Staroye =

Tamazatyube Staroye Тамазатюбе Старое Эски Тамаза-Тоьбе
- Selo
- Location within Republic of Dagestan Location within Russia
- Coordinates: 43°39′N 47°10′E
- Country: Russia
- Region: Republic of Dagestan
- District: Babayurtovsky District
- Time zone: UTC+3:00

Tamazatyube Staroye (Russian: Тамазатюбе Старое; Nogai: Эски Тамаза-Тоьбе, Eski Tamaza-Töbe) is a rural locality (a selo) and the administrative centre of Tamazatyubinsky Selsoviet, Babayurtovsky District, Republic of Dagestan, Russia. The population was 403 as of 2010. There are 6 streets.

== Geography ==
Tamazatyube Staroye is located 34 km east of Babayurt (the district's administrative centre) by road. Tsadakh is the nearest rural locality.
