= Muzhukay =

Muzhukay Мужукай Мыжыкай
- Selo
- Location within Republic of Dagestan Location within Russia
- Coordinates: 43°37′N 46°54′E
- Country: Russia
- Region: Republic of Dagestan
- District: Babayurtovsky District
- Time zone: UTC+3:00

Muzhukay (Russian: Мужукай; Nogai: Мыжыкай, Mıjıkay) is a rural locality (a selo) and the administrative centre of Muzhukaysky Selsoviet, Babayurtovsky District, Republic of Dagestan, Russia. The population was 545 as of 2010. There are 6 streets. Selo was founded in 1865.

== Geography ==
Muzhukay is located 13 km northeast of Babayurt (the district's administrative centre) by road. Yangylbay is the nearest rural locality.
