= Tamazatyube =

Tamazatyube Тамазатюбе Тамаза-Тоьбе
- Selo
- Location within Republic of Dagestan Location within Russia
- Coordinates: 43°34′N 47°09′E
- Country: Russia
- Region: Republic of Dagestan
- District: Babayurtovsky District
- Time zone: UTC+3:00

Tamazatyube (Russian: Тамазатюбе; Nogai: Тамаза-Тоьбе, Tamaza-Töbe) is a rural locality (a selo) and the administrative centre of Tamazatyubinsky Selsoviet, Babayurtovsky District, Republic of Dagestan, Russia. The population was 1,718 as of 2010. There are 19 streets. Selo was founded in 1939.

== Geography ==
Tamazatyube is located 42 km northeast of Babayurt (the district's administrative centre) by road. Tamazatyube is the nearest rural locality.
