= Tatayurt =

Tatayurt Татаюрт Тота-юрт
- Selo
- Location within Republic of Dagestan Location within Russia
- Coordinates: 43°33′N 46°59′E
- Country: Russia
- Region: Republic of Dagestan
- District: Babayurtovsky District
- Time zone: UTC+3:00

Tatayurt (Russian: Татаюрт; Nogai: Тота-юрт, Tota-yurt) is a rural locality (a selo) in Tamazatyubinsky Selsoviet, Babayurtovsky District, Republic of Dagestan, Russia. The population was 2,366 as of 2010. There are 24 streets.

== Geography ==
Tatayurt is located 20 km southeast of Babayurt (the district's administrative centre) by road. Tsadakh is the nearest rural locality.
