= Germenchik =

Germenchik Герменчик Герменчик-отар
- Selo
- Location within Republic of Dagestan Location within Russia
- Coordinates: 43°32′N 46°43′E
- Country: Russia
- Region: Republic of Dagestan
- District: Babayurtovsky District
- Time zone: UTC+3:00

Germenchik (Russian: Герменчик; Nogai: Герменчик-отар, Germençik-otar) is a rural locality (a selo) in Babayurtovsky District, Republic of Dagestan, Russia. The population was 2,228 as of 2010. There are 20 streets. Selo was founded in 1874.

== Geography ==
Germenchik is located 10 km southwest of Babayurt (the district's administrative centre) by road. Narysh is the nearest rural locality.
