= Sovetskoye, Babayurtovsky District, Republic of Dagestan =

Sovetskoye Советское
- Selo
- Location within Republic of Dagestan Location within Russia
- Coordinates: 43°35′N 46°41′E
- Country: Russia
- Region: Republic of Dagestan
- District: Babayurtovsky District
- Time zone: UTC+3:00

Sovetskoye (Russian: Советское) is a rural locality (a selo) in Turshunaysky Selsoviet, Babayurtovsky District, Republic of Dagestan, Russia. The population was 1,057 as of 2010. There are 7 streets.

== Geography ==
Sovetskoye is located 12 km west of Babayurt (the district's administrative centre) by road. Turshunay is the nearest rural locality.
