= Utsmiyurt =

Utsmiyurt Уцмиюрт Уцмуюрт
- Selo
- Location within Republic of Dagestan Location within Russia
- Coordinates: 43°32′N 46°28′E
- Country: Russia
- Region: Republic of Dagestan
- District: Babayurtovsky District
- Time zone: UTC+3:00

Utsmiyurt (Russian: Уцмиюрт; Kumyk: Уцмуюрт, Utsmuyurt) is a rural locality (a selo) in Babayurtovsky District, Republic of Dagestan, Russia. The population was 3,541 as of 2010. There are 33 streets.

== Geography ==
Utsmiyurt is located on the right bank of the Terek River, 33 km southwest of Babayurt (the district's administrative centre) by road. Dzerzhinskoye is the nearest rural locality.
