= Khamamatyurt =

Khamamatyurt Хамаматюрт
- Selo
- Location within Republic of Dagestan Location within Russia
- Coordinates: 43°36′N 46°30′E
- Country: Russia
- Region: Republic of Dagestan
- District: Babayurtovsky District
- Time zone: UTC+3:00

Khamamatyurt (Russian: Хамаматюрт; Kumyk: Хамаматюрт, Xamamatyurt) is a rural locality (a selo) in Babayurtovsky District, Republic of Dagestan, Russia. The population was 4,682 as of 2010. There are 39 streets.

The land around Khamamatyurt is largely flat. The highest point in the area is 20 meters above sea level and is 4.6 km west of Khamamatyurt. With about 11 people per square kilometer, the area around Khamamatyurt is sparsely populated.

== Geography ==
Khamamatyurt is located on the right bank of the Terek River, 24 km west of Babayurt (the district's administrative centre) by road. Kalininaul is the nearest rural locality.
