= Turshunay =

Turshunay Туршунай
- Selo
- Location within Republic of Dagestan Location within Russia
- Coordinates: 43°35′N 46°39′E
- Country: Russia
- Region: Republic of Dagestan
- District: Babayurtovsky District
- Time zone: UTC+3:00

Turshunay (Russian: Туршунай; Kumyk: Туршунай, Turşunay) is a rural locality (a selo) and the administrative centre of Turshunaysky Selsoviet, Babayurtovsky District, Republic of Dagestan, Russia. The population was 1,238 as of 2010. There are 7 streets.

== Geography ==
Turshunay is located 8 km west of Babayurt (the district's administrative centre) by road. Sovetskoye is the nearest rural locality.
