= Khasanay =

Khasanay Хасанай Гьасанай
- Selo
- Location within Republic of Dagestan Location within Russia
- Coordinates: 43°37′N 46°42′E
- Country: Russia
- Region: Republic of Dagestan
- District: Babayurtovsky District
- Time zone: UTC+3:00

Khasanay (Russian: Хасанай; Kumyk: Гьасанай, Hasanay) is a rural locality (a selo) in Khasanaysky Selsoviet, Babayurtovsky District, Republic of Dagestan, Russia. The population was 1,017 as of 2010. There are 6 streets.

== Geography ==
Khasanay is located 8 km northwest of Babayurt (the district's administrative centre) by road. Sovetskoye is the nearest rural locality.
