= Ak Nogai =

Subgroup of Nogai people

The Ak Nogai are a division of the Nogai whose dialect forms the main base for the literary Nogai language.

They live in northern Karachay–Cherkessia.

== Sources ==
- Wixman, Ronald. The Peoples of the USSR: An Ethnographic Handbook. (Armonk, New York: M. E. Sharpe, Inc, 1984) p. 7
