= Karagash =

карагаш-ногайлар
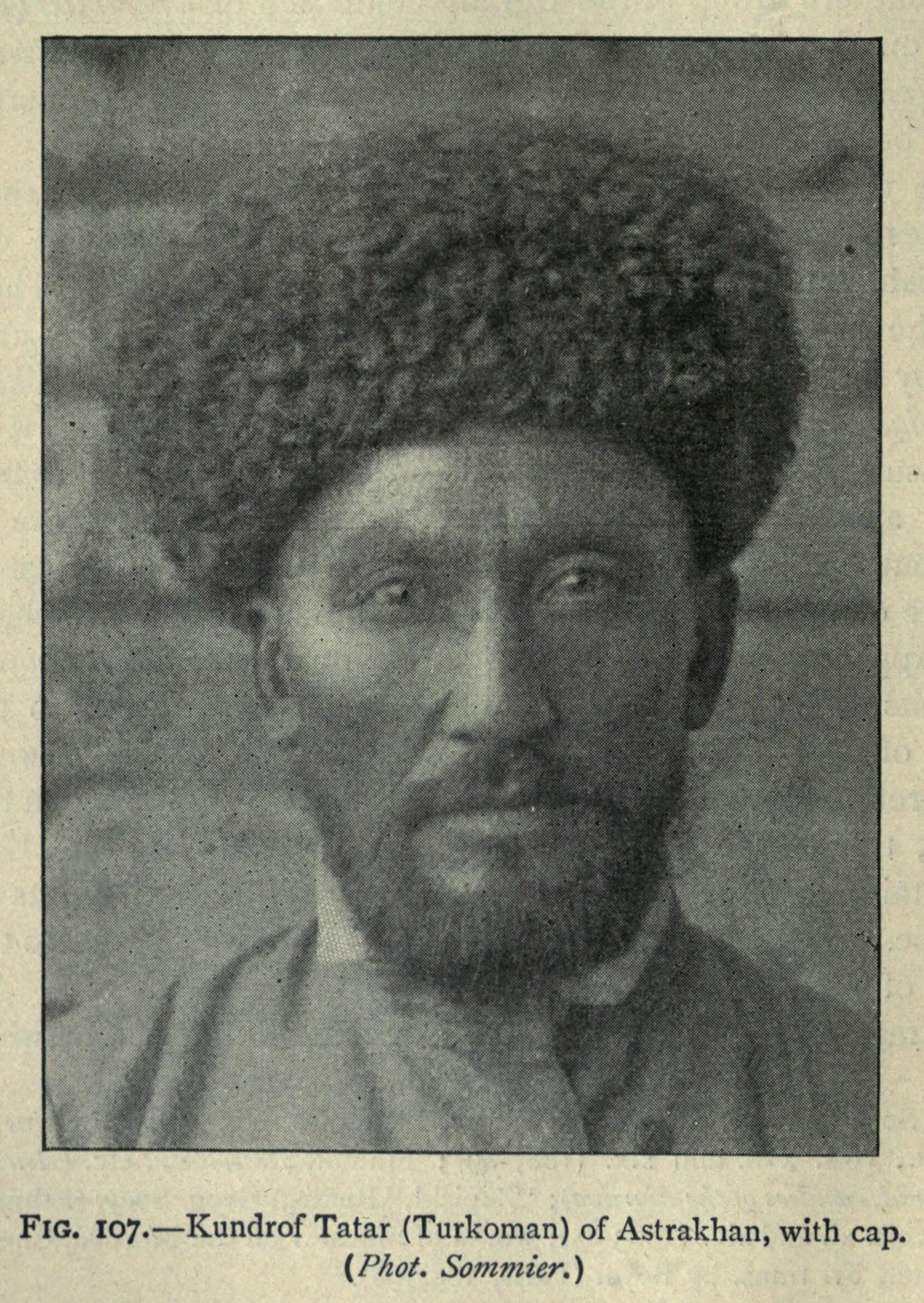
- "Kundrof Tatar" (Karagash Noghay) 1906

Total population
- ca. 7,000 - 8,000

Regions with significant populations
- (Russia)
- Russia: 7,000 (2008)

Languages
- Nogai (Karagash dialect)

Religion
- Sunni Islam

Related ethnic groups
- Nogay

The Karagash (or as they call themselves, Qaragashly, and Qaragash-nogailar) are one of the ethnic Nogay groups that live in the vicinity of Astrakhan, Russia. The largest Karagash settlement is the town of Rastopulovka.

== Sources ==
- Wixman, Ronald. The Peoples of the Soviet Union: An Ethnographic Handbook. (Armonk: M. E> Sharp, 1984) p. 93
