= Nogais =

Turkic ethnic group in North Caucasus

Total population
- c. 230,000

Regions with significant populations
- Russia: 126,681
- ∟ Dagestan: 40,407
- ∟ Stavropol Krai: 22,569
- ∟ Karachay-Cherkessia: 17,368
- ∟ Khanty-Mansia: 9,990
- ∟ Astrakhan Oblast: 9,320
- ∟ Yamalia: 3,740
- ∟ Chechnya: 3,444
- Turkey: 90,000–100,000
- Kazakhstan: 34,000–50,000
- Uzbekistan: 10,000
- Romania: 7,318
- Bulgaria: 3,453
- Ukraine: 2,880

Languages
- Nogai, Russian

Religion
- Sunni Islam

Related ethnic groups
- Manghuds, other Kipchak peoples Especially Crimean Tatars, Kazakhs, Kyrgyzs, Karakalpaks, Volga Tatars, Lipka Tatars

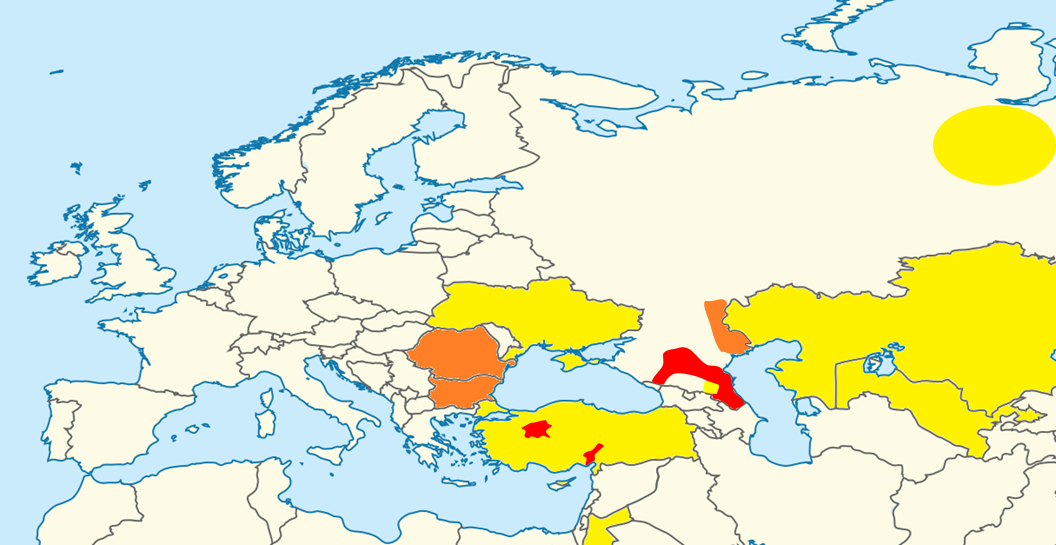
The map shows the Nogai population. more than 10,000 people 5,000–10,000 people presence of Nogais

The Nogais (/noʊˈɡaɪ/ noh-GY) (Note: Nogai: Ногайлар, Noğaylar, IPA: [noʁɑjˈɫɑr]) are a Turkic people who speak Nogai, a language from the Kipchak branch of the Turkic languages. They live in Eastern Europe (including the North Caucasus and the Volga region), Central Asia, and Turkey. Most are found in northern Dagestan and Stavropol Krai, as well as in Karachay-Cherkessia, Chechnya, and Astrakhan Oblast; some also live in Dobruja (Romania and Bulgaria), Turkey, Kazakhstan, Uzbekistan, Ukraine, and a small Nogai diaspora is found in Syria and Jordan. They speak the Nogai language and are descendants of various Mongolic and Turkic tribes who formed the Nogai Horde. There are nine main groups of Nogais: the Ak Nogai, the Karagash, the Koban-Nogai, the Kundraw-Nogai, the Achikulak-Nogai, the Qara-Nogai, the Utars, the Bug-Nogai, and the Yurt-Nogai.

== Name ==
Their name comes from their eponymous founder, Nogai Khan (lit. 'dog' in Mongolian), a grandson of Jochi. Nogai (d. 1299–1300) was de facto ruler, kingmaker, and briefly self-proclaimed khan of the Golden Horde. The name is also spelled as Nogay or Noghay, and they are also known as the Nogalar or Mangkyt.

== Geographic distribution ==
In the 1990s, 65,000 were still living in the Northern Caucasus, divided into Aq (White) Nogai and Qara (Black) Nogai tribal confederations. Nogais live in the territories of Dagestan, Chechnya, Stavropol Krai, and Astrakhan Oblast. From 1928 there was a Nogaysky District, Republic of Dagestan and from 2007 a Nogaysky District, Karachay-Cherkess Republic.

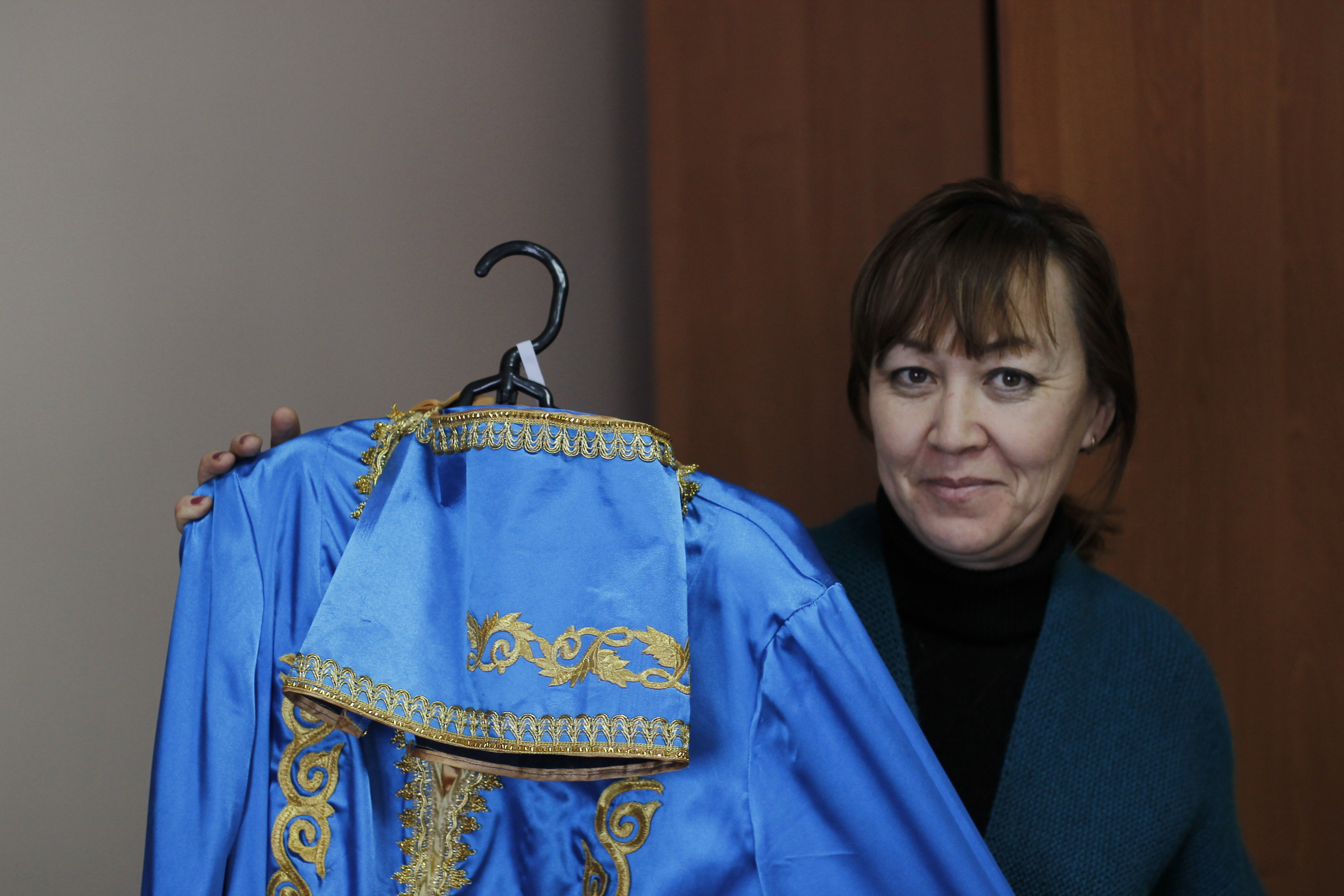
Nogai Culture Museum in Yasyn-Sokan, Astrakhan Oblast, Russia

A few thousand Nogais live in Dobruja (today in Romania), in the town of Mihail Kogălniceanu (Karamurat) and villages of Lumina (Kocali), Valea Dacilor (Hendekkarakuyusu), and Cobadin (Kubadin).

A few thousand Bug-Nogais live in Budjak (today in Ukraine), and they are concentrated mainly in southwest Budjak. They live in the villages of Kotlovyna, Kosa, Krynychne, Karakurt, Oksamytne, Ozerne, Topolyne, Tabaky, Zaliznychne, and Vladychen. They also inhabit the towns of Bolhrad and Kubei. They also inhabit the cities of Izmail and Tatarbunary.

Nogai minorities also live in Bulgaria, mainly in Northeast and Southeast planning regions. A minority also lives in Haskovo province.

The number of Nogais living in Turkey today is disputed. Estimates claim there are 90,000–100,000 Nogais (Nogai Turks) in the country. They mainly settled in Ceyhan/Adana, Ankara, and Eskisehir provinces. The Nogai language is still spoken in some of the villages of Central Anatolia – mainly around Salt Lake, Eskişehir, and Ceyhan. To this day, Nogais in Turkey have maintained their cuisine: üken börek, kaşık börek, tabak börek, şır börek, köbete and Nogay şay (Nogai tea – a drink prepared by boiling milk and tea together with butter, salt and pepper).

The Junior Juz or the Lesser Horde of the Kazakhs occupied the lands of the former Nogai Khanate in Western Kazakhstan. A part of the Nogais joined the Kazakhs in the 17th and 18th centuries and formed a separate clan or tribe called as Kazakh-Nogais. Their estimated number is about 50,000.

=== Subgroups ===
From the 16th century until their deportation in the mid-19th century, the Nogais living along the Black Sea northern coast were divided into the following sub-groups (west to east):

- Bucak (Budjak) Nogais inhabited the area from Danube to Dniester.
- Cedsan (Yedisan) Nogais inhabited the land from Dniester to Southern Bug.
- Camboyluk (Jamboyluk) Nogais inhabited in the lands from Bug to the beginning of Crimean Peninsula.
- Cedişkul (Jedishkul) Nogais inhabited the north of Crimean peninsula.
- Koban (Kuban) Nogais inhabited the north of Sea of Azov around Prymorsk (previously Nogaisk).

== Nogai tribes ==
The following is a list of the Nogai tribes, namely, As, Aksyuryut, Alchin, Ashamayly, Altayak, Badai, Bayis, Baygondy, Bayuly, Batar, Bayaut, Bodrak, Borlak, Bulachi, Burkut, Butas, Jalair, Juyut, Duvan, Durmen, Kazak, Kangly, Kara-Kitay, Kat, Katagan, Kelechi, Keneges, Kenegay, Keneterk, Kereit, Kigit, Kipchak, Kirgiz, Kirgin, Kirk, Kitay, Kishlik, Kiyat, Kula-Ayan, Kungrat, Madzhar, Mangyt, Mashkir, Merkit, Mesit, Ming, Naiman, Nukus, Keliaul, Ongut, Saray, Sidzhyut, Solut, Tama, Temir-Khodzha, Togay, Togunchi, Toytyube, Turksen, Turchak, Uzbek, Uymaut, Uysun, Chaljiyut, Chat, Chubalachi, Chumishly, Shakmanchi, Shemerden, Yuz, Kulachi, Teleu, Uygur, and Chimbay.

== Genetics ==
It can be considered that the gene pool of the Nogais has absorbed so many Eurasian genetic flows that it can successfully serve as one of the standards of the "genetic pole of the Eurasian steppe".

— Balanovsky, Oleg Pavlovich

The ethnic history of the Nogai people is primarily based on the naming of a branched clan stratification, where the ethnonymy of specific clans and clan groups, combined with the customary identification of clan-family signs (tamga), clearly traces the ethno-genetic and historical-cultural continuity with the ethnonyms of major actors from early and later periods across the North Eurasian space. The interethnic integration of these groups formed the totality and overall unity of the Nogai ethnic community. The ethnic foundation of the people was formed by ancient groups such as the Naimans, Siraki, Uysun, Kangly, Kipchaks, Asi, Mangyt, Bulgars, Bayysy, Bodraki, Kobany, Baydary, Mazhar and others, who inhabited the Irtysh region, Northwestern Mongolia, Central Asia, Southern Ural, Lower Volga, Northern Caucasus, Crimea, Northern Black Sea region, Don region, Azov region, and Lower Dnieper region. Many of these groups had their own states.

In the genetic history of the Nogai population of Kuban, there were two episodes of admixture with populations from Southern Siberia and Mongolia: in the 8th and 17th centuries.

According to an ethnogenetic study conducted by Kazakh researchers Zh. M. Sabitov and A. K. Abdullin among the Nogais of the Republic of Dagestan, a representative of the Bayat (or Tore) clan from Anevska village, Tarumovsky District, who claimed descent from the murza of the Yedishkul Horde and whose genealogy was thus associated by the authors with the founding lineage of the Nogai ruling dynasty Edige, was found to belong to the C2 supercluster. The authors associate this haplogroup with Nirun Mongols tribes, to which the Manghit clan belonged.

== History ==
The name Nogai derives from Nogai Khan (died 1299/1300, great-great-grandson of Genghis Khan), a general of the Golden Horde. The Nogai homeland is known as Nogaistan and lies on the Nogai Steppe. The Nogai originated as nomadic tribes in Central Asia, and following their conquest by the Golden Horde in the 13th century, they migrated west. A Mongol tribe called the Manghits (Manghut) constituted a core of the Nogai Horde. The Nogai Horde supported the Astrakhan Khanate, and after the conquest of Astrakhan in 1556 by the Russians, they transferred their allegiance to the Crimean Khanate. The Nogais protected the northern borders of the Crimean Khanate, and through organized raids to the Wild Fields inhibited Slavic settlement. Many Nogais migrated to the Crimean peninsula to serve as the Crimean khans' cavalry. Settling there, they contributed to the formation of the Crimean Tatars. They raised various herds and migrated seasonally in search of better pastures for their animals. Nogais were proud of their nomadic traditions and independence, which they considered superior to settled agricultural life.

The recorded history of the Nogais first commenced when representatives of the Ottoman Empire reached the Terek–Kuma Lowland, where the Nogais were living as rogue clans and herders. There were two main chiefs: Yusuf Mirza and Ismail Mirza, Bey of the Nogai Horde from 1555 to 1563. Yusuf Mirza supported joining the Ottomans. However, his brother Ismail Mirza, who was allied with the Russians, ambushed Yusuf and declared his chiefdom under Russian rule. After that, the supporters of Yusuf Mirza migrated to Crimea and Yedisan, joining the Crimean Khanate. Supporters of Yusuf took the name Qara, later named by Crimeans as Kichi (Lesser Nogai Horde founded in 1557 by Mirza Kazy). Those who remained in present-day West Kazakhstan and the North Caucasus (Greater Nogai Horde) took the name Uly (Strong).

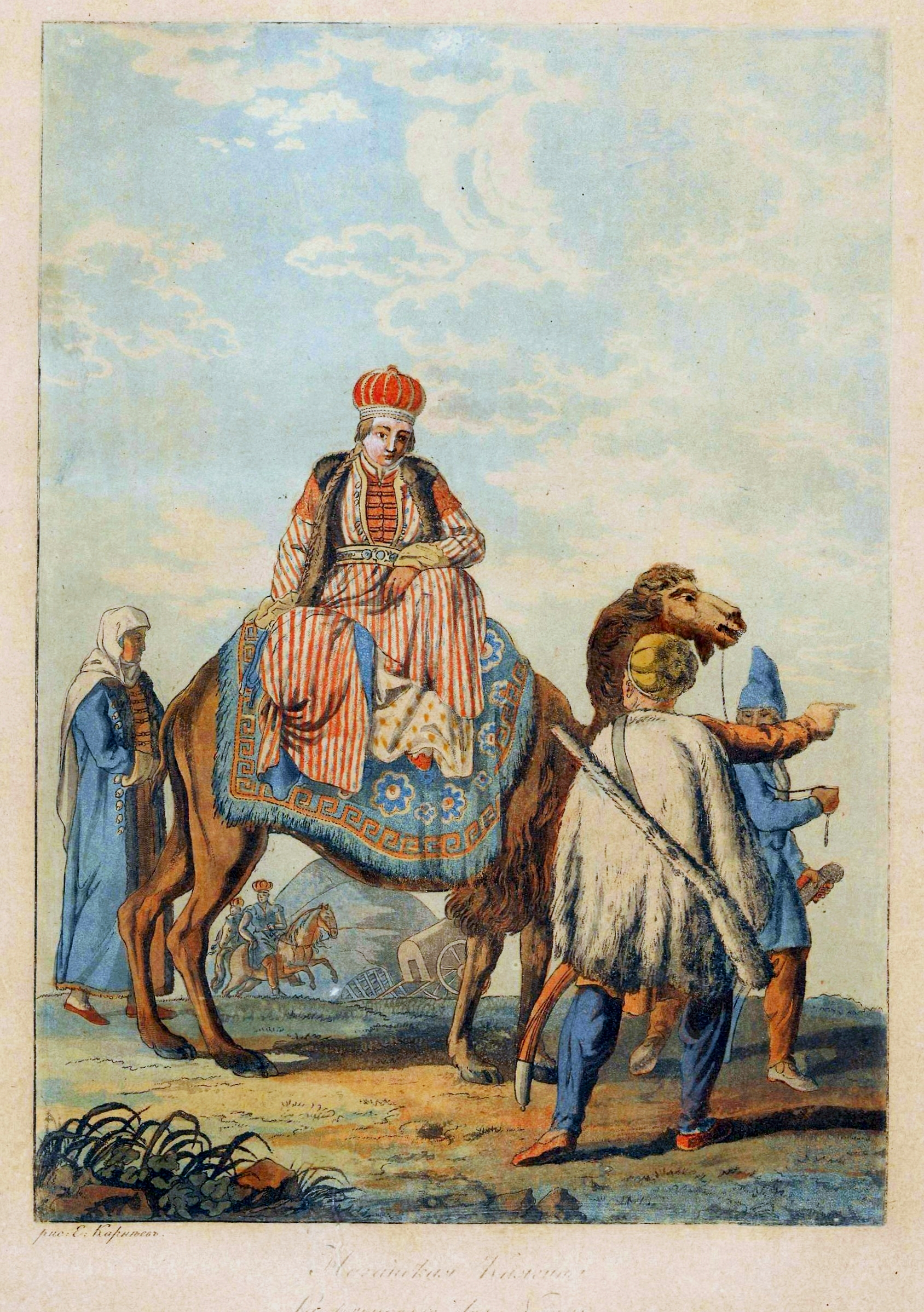
Nogay Princess by Paul Jacob Laminit after Emelyan Korneev, 1812, National Museum in Warsaw

At the beginning of the 17th century, the ancestors of the Kalmyks, the Oirats, migrated from the steppes of southern Siberia on the banks of the Irtysh River to the Lower Volga region. Various theories attempt to explain this move, but the generally accepted view is that the Kalmyks sought abundant pastures for their herds. They reached the Volga about 1630. That land, however, was not uncontested pasture, but rather the homeland of the Nogai Horde. The Kalmyks expelled the Nogais, who fled to the Northern Caucasian Plains and to the Crimean Khanate, areas under the control of the Ottoman Empire. Some Nogai groups sought the protection of the Russian garrison at Astrakhan. The remaining nomadic Turkic tribes became vassals of the Kalmyk khan.

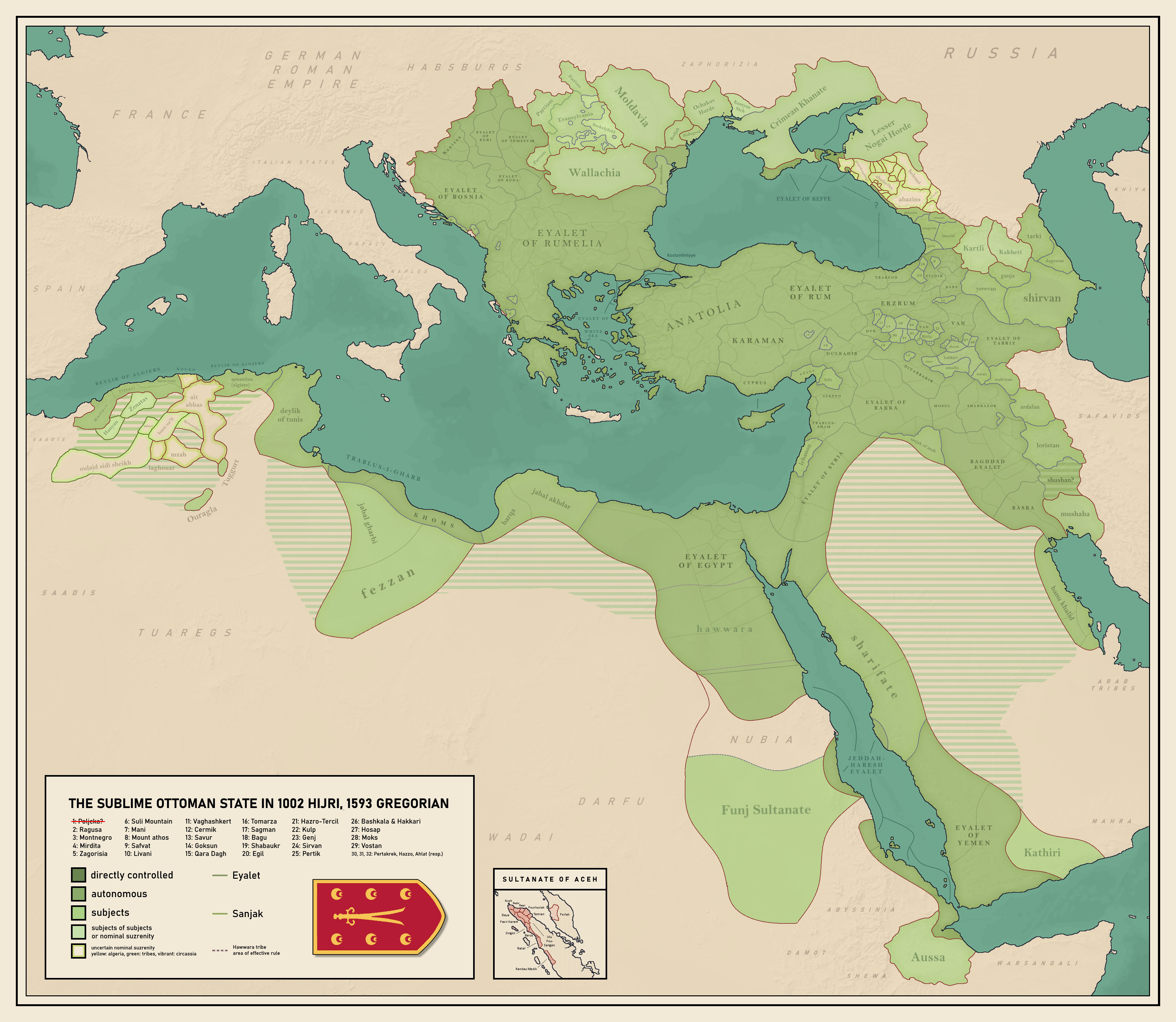
Vassal and tributary states of the Ottoman Empire, including the Lesser Nogai Horde, Ochakov Horde, and Budjak Horde

After the Russian annexation of Crimea in 1783, Slavic and other settlers occupied the Nogai pastoral land, since the Nogais did not have permanent residence. In the 1770s and 1780s the Russian Empress Catherine the Great resettled approximately 120,000 Nogais from Bessarabia and areas northeast of the Sea of Azov to the Kuban and the Caucasus. In 1790, during the Russo-Turkish war, Prince Grigory Potemkin ordered the resettlement of some Nogai families from the Caucasus (where, he feared, they might defect to the Ottomans) to the north shore of the Sea of Azov. With the 1792 Treaty of Jassy (Iaşi) the Russian frontier expanded to the Dniester River and the Russian takeover of Yedisan was complete. The 1812 Treaty of Bucharest transferred Budjak to Russian control.

After confiscating the land previously belonged to the Nogais, the Russian government forced Nogais to settle through various methods, such as burning their tents and limiting their freedom of movement. The Russian general Alexander Suvorov slaughtered thousands of rebellious Kuban Nogais in 1783. Several Nogai tribes took refuge among the Circassians in this period. Several other Nogai clans began to migrate to the Ottoman Empire in great numbers. The Nogais followed two routes. An estimated 7,000 Nogais of the Bucak and Cedsan Hordes settled in Dobruja before 1860. Most of these Nogais later migrated to Anatolia. However, the great exodus of the Nogais took place in 1860. Many clans from the Camboyluk and Kuban Hordes moved westwards to southern Ukraine, and wintered with the local ethnics there in 1859. They emigrated either through the ports of Feodosia or Kerch, or by crossing via the Budjak steppes to Dobruja. 50,000 of the roughly 70,000 Nogais of the Kuban and adjacent Stavropol region left Russia for the Ottoman Empire during this period. They induced the Nogais of Crimea (who lived in the districts of Yevpatoria, Perekop and in the north of Simferopol) to emigrate too. Similarly, 50,000 Nogais disappeared from northern Black Sea region by 1861. Other Nogai clans emigrated directly from the Caucasus to Anatolia, together with the Circassians. Nogais lived alongside German-speaking Mennonites in the Molochna region of southern Ukraine from 1803, when the Mennonites first arrived there, until 1860, when the Nogais were deported.

== Notable Nogais ==
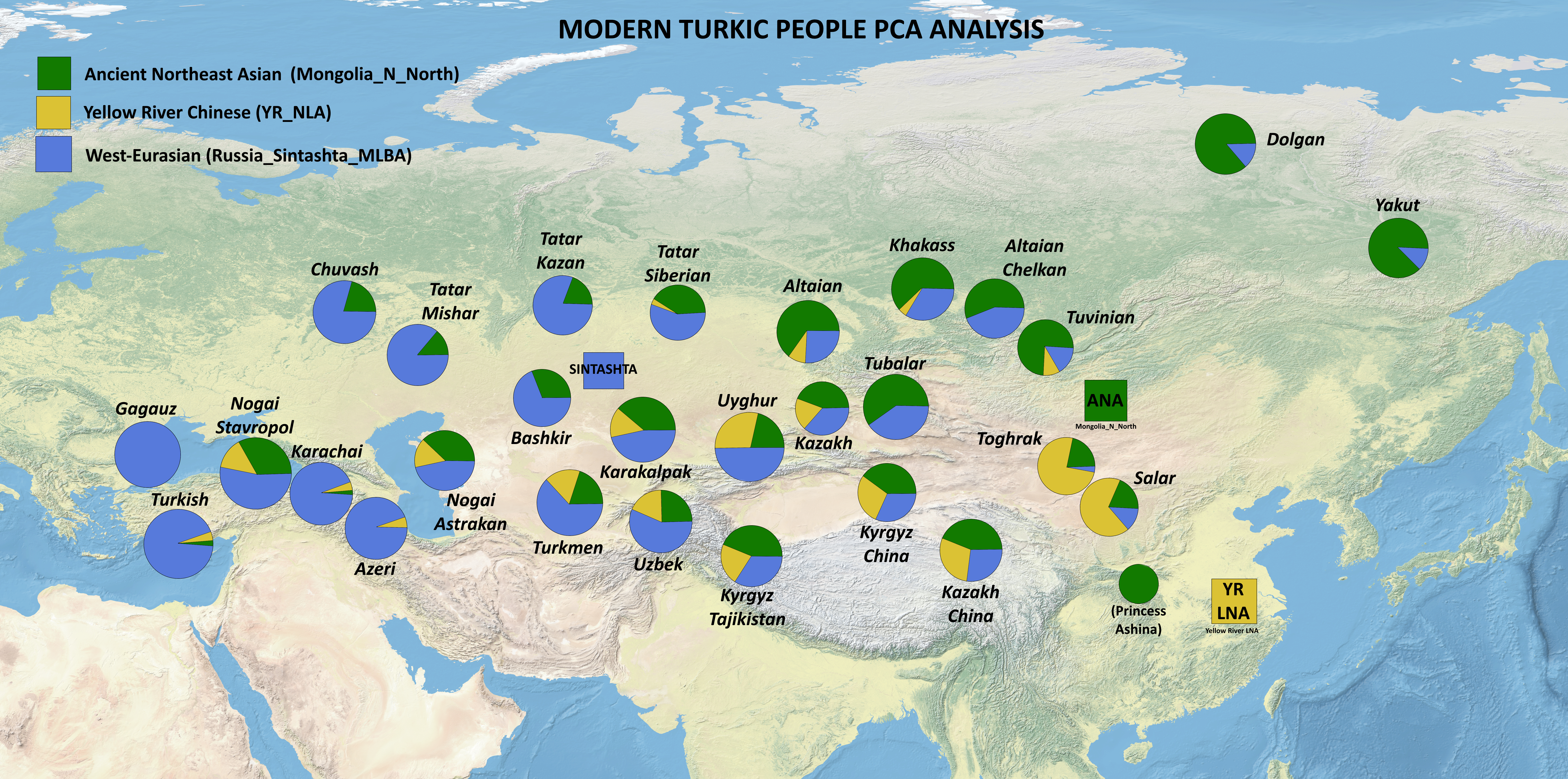
Modern Turkic People PCA Analysis, including the Nogais (Stravropol). Modelled proportions of Ancient Northeast Asian ancestry (ANA, ), as well as Chinese Yellow River (YR_NLA, ) and Sintashta ( ) ancestry.

- Albert Batyrgaziev (born 1998), boxer, Olympic gold medalist
- Arslanbek Sultanbekov (born 1965), musician
- Nurlan Nogaev (born 1967), politician
- Cüneyt Arkın (1937–2022), film actor
- Byrganym Aitimova (born 1953), politician

== See also ==
- Little Tartary
- Tatars of Romania
- Manghud
- Crimean–Nogai raids into East Slavic lands
- Karagash
- Nağaybäk
- De-Tatarization of Crimea

== Sources ==
- Lee, Joo-Yup (31 July 2023). The Turkic Peoples in World History. Taylor & Francis. ISBN 978-1-000-90422-2.
- Williams, Victoria R. (24 February 2020). "Nogai". Indigenous Peoples: An Encyclopedia of Culture, History, and Threats to Survival [4 volumes]. Bloomsbury Publishing USA. pp. 812–815. ISBN 978-1-4408-6118-5.
