= State Anthem of Karachay-Cherkessia =

Anthem of a Russian federal subject in the North Caucasus

Гимн Карачаево-Черкесии Къарачай-Черкес Республиканы Гимни Къэрэщей-Шэрджэс Республикэм и Къэрал Орэдыр Карашай-Шеркеш Республикасынынъ Патшалык Гимни Къарча-Черкес Республика Къральыгӏва Гимн
English: Anthem of Karachay-Cherkessia
- Coat of arms of Karachay-Cherkessia
- Regional anthem of Karachay-Cherkessia
- Lyrics: Yusuf Sozarukov (Russian version); Shamil Uzdenov (Karachay-Balkar version)
- Music: Aslan Daurov
- Adopted: 1998

Audio sample
- Band instrumental recording: file; help

Band instrumental recording (one verse and chorus)

The National Anthem of Karachay-Cherkessia (Russian: Гимн Карачаево-Черкесии, romanized: Gimn Karachayevo-Cherkesii; Karachay-Balkar: Къарачай-Черкес Республиканы Гимни; Kabardian: Къэрэщей-Шэрджэс Республикэм и Къэрал Орэдыр; Nogai: Карашай-Шеркеш Республикасынынъ Гимни) is the national anthem of the Karachay-Cherkess Republic, a federal subject of Russia in the North Caucasus. The lyrics were written by Yusuf Sozarukov (1952–2008), and the music was composed by Aslan Daurov (1940–1999). The anthem was adopted on 9 April 1998 by Law of the KChR number 410-XXII "On the State Anthem of the Republic of Karachay-Cherkessia". The title of the song is "Древней Родиной горжусь я!", meaning "Ancient Homeland I am proud of!".

== Lyrics ==
=== In Russian ===
Russian lyrics

I
Древней Родиной горжусь я!
Вечен свет снегов Эльбруса
И свята Кубани чистая струя!

𝄆 Эти степи, эти горы
Мне — и корни и опора,
Карачаево-Черкесия моя! 𝄇

II
Благодарен я Отчизне
За все годы своей жизни
Среди братских языков, родимых лиц,

𝄆 Ты дана самой природой,
Колыбель моих народов,
Городов моих, аулов и станиц! 𝄇

III
Ты — жемчужина России!
Пусть под мирным небом синим
Будет доброю всегда судьба твоя!

𝄆 И живи в веках, родная,
Зла и горечи не зная,
Карачаево-Черкесия моя! 𝄇

English translation

I
Ancient homeland I am proud of!
Unbreakable light of the snow of Mount Elbrus:
The glossy and unmerely pure jet of the Kuban!

𝄆 These steppes, these mountains
To me are the roots and the towers,
My Karachay-Cherkessia! 𝄇

II
I am thankful to the motherland
During all the years of life among its
Sister languages, these words creates the people,

𝄆 You are given the very nature, the cradle
Of my peoples, my cities,
Even my auls and stanitsas! 𝄇

III
You — the pearl of Russia!
Let the peaceful sky blue
Will always be your fate!

𝄆 And live in centuries, my home,
Evil and bitterness not knowing,
My Karachay-Cherkessia! 𝄇

=== In local languages ===
Karachay-Balkar lyrics

I
Мени къадим джуртым ёхтемликим!
Минъини къарны джарыкъы тохтаусуз
Бла сыйлы Къобан!

𝄆 Бу къырла, бу таула,
Мени тамырым бла башням,
Мени Къарачай-Черкесим! 𝄇

II
Aта джуртым ючюн мен разыйым
Ёмюрлюк ашауылы
Къарнаш тилле, халкъы арасында,

𝄆 Бизге бериргегъан да кесинъ,
Мени джуртым мени халкъым,
Mени шахарлам ауллам бла станселем! 𝄇

III
Cен инджисин Pоссия!
Кёк хошлулуки алашасыда
Xар заман сэни джазыу боллукту!

𝄆 Бла джюз джылладжа джашаргъар, джуртым,
Xыянат бла ачы билемете,
Мени Къарачай-Черкесим! 𝄇

Karachay-Balkar lyrics (Shamil Uzdenov)

I
Эски Джуртум кёллендиред!
Минги Тауум джарыкъ тёгед,
Шам Къобанны кёрсем болад нюр эсим!

𝄆 Мелхум тюзле, мийик таула,
Бизге тамыр, дагъан бола,
Джашайд мени Къарачайым-Черкесим! 𝄇

II
Мен разыма, Джуртум, сеннге,
Сенсе джашау берген меннге,
Багъалыды меннге хар атлам джеринг!

𝄆 Табигъатны хур ишисе,
Халкъларымы бешигисе,
Джашнасынла шахарларынг, эллеринг! 𝄇

III
Эресейни инджисисе!
Рахатлыкъгъа бёлене, сен
Джашна, сени бек сакъласын джер кеси!

𝄆 Къаджау турмай сеннге джарсыу,
Хаман насыб теджей джазыу,
Джаша, мени Къарачайым-Черкесим! 𝄇

Kabardian lyrics

I
Cи Xэкужь, си гушхуэ!
Ӏуащхьэмахуэм и уэсы нэхур егъашӀа
ИкӀи Псыжь лъапӀа!

𝄆 Mы гугъуэхэр, мы къущхьэхэр,
Cисейщ си лъапсэрэ си пкъорэ,
Cи Къэрэщей-Шэрджэс! 𝄇

II
Cи хэку папщӀэ сэ софӀыгъэлъагъу
Уи псоригъащӀэу
Зэкъцэщуэщ бзэхэр, жылэм хэтщ,

𝄆 Уэ къыдэтыщ щӀыуэпсым езыр,
Cи абгъуэ си жылэщ,
Cи къалэхэр, си къуажэхэррэ губгъуэхэррэ 𝄇

III
Уэ уналкъутщ Урысей!
ЩхъуантӀэ гузагъэм и щӀагъ
Cыт щыгъуи уи нэсып хъунущ!

𝄆 ИкӀи лӀэшӀэгъум гъэщӀэнущ, си хэку,
Ӏеягъэрэ гуауэрэ зэрэщӀэкъымуэ,
Cи Къэрэщей-Шэрджэс! 𝄇

Nogai lyrics

I
Меним бурынгы еримди мактан этемен!
Эльбрусдынъ оьмирлик ярыгы кар явады
Эм Кобаннынъ касиетди таза агыны!

𝄆 Бул кырлар, бул тавлар,
Мен уьшин - тамырлар эм тирек,
Меним Карашай-Шеркешим! 𝄇

II
Мен элге разымын
Оьмиримнинъ баьри йылларында
Кардаш тиллер арасында, тувган адемлер,

𝄆 Саган табиаттан оьзи берилген,
Халкымнынъ бесиким,
Меним калаларым, авылларым эм станицаларым! 𝄇

III
Сен Ресейдинъ ынжы-буьртигисен!
Коьк аспан астында болсын,
Болаяк насыпынъыз яхшы болсын!

𝄆 Заманлар бойы оьмир суьр, тувган эл,
Яманлык пен ашшы даьм билмей,
Меним Карашай-Шеркешим! 𝄇

Abaza lyrics

I
Сара апхъачӏви сыпсадгьыл алардухара!
Эльбрусса асы анцӏрагьи алашара:
Къвбина рххвара цкьагьы чӏыхӏ!

𝄆 Арат архъаква, арат щхъаква,
Сара сгвы – ащайдзаква цӏагыла,
Сара Къарча-Черкес! 𝄇

II
Итабуп хъва уасхъвойт апсадгьыл,
Асквш аурала зымгӏва нцӏрата
Йайщчву бызшваква аквта, квпшыра ашӏахъа.

𝄆 Уара апсабара рахӏа къвады,
Сыжвларква гарадыр,
Сыкъалакъва, сакытакъва, станицакъва! 𝄇

III
Уара – ащхъарауа Россия!
Тынч чӏыхв жвгӏванд ацӏахьса йалрагӏатӏ,
Улахьынца йнахъапӏ ибзиазааит!

𝄆 Йбзазтӏ насквшышвкӏ, псадгьыл,
Гвымхара, айша йыгьсыздырам,
Сара Къарча-Черкес! 𝄇
