= Rastopulovka =

Village in Russia

Coordinates: 46°30′03″N 48°02′05″E

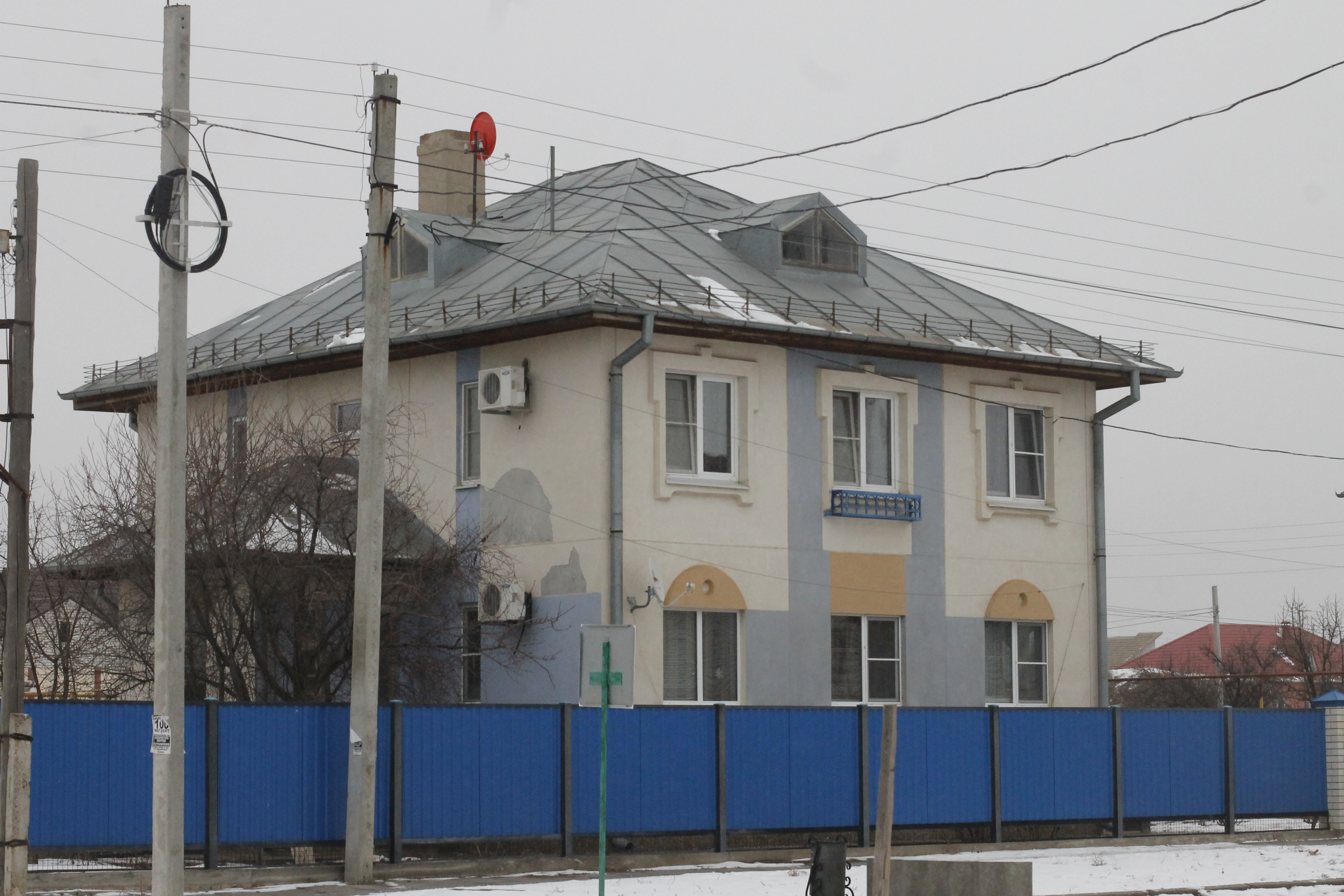
A typical house on the main street of Rastopulovka

Rastopulovka (Russian: Растопуловка, IPA: [rəstɐˈpuɫəfkə]) is a selo in Privolzhsky District, Astrakhan Oblast, Russia. A self-governing rural settlement with a population of 2,390, it has a town hall, school, kindergarten, police station, and mosque. The current mayor is Mansur Saparov. The largest ethnic group is the Karagash (50%), followed by Kazakhs (31%), Tatars (10%) and Russians (8%).
