= Karachay-Cherkessia =

First-level administrative division of Russia

Karachay-Cherkess Republic Карачаево-Черкесская Республика (Russian)
- Republic

Other transcription(s)
  - Karachay-Balkar: Къарачай-Черкес Республика
  - Kabardian: Къэрэшей-Шэрджэс Республикэ
  - Nogai: Карашай-Шеркеш Республикасы
  - Abaza: Къарча-Черкес Республика
- Flag Coat of arms
- Anthem: State Anthem of Karachay-Cherkessia
- Interactive map of Karachay-Cherkess Republic
- Location within European Russia
- Coordinates: 43°55′N 41°47′E
- Country: Russia
- Federal district: North Caucasian
- Economic region: North Caucasus
- Established: 3 July 1991
- Capital: Cherkessk

Government
  - Body: People's Assembly
  - Head: Rashid Temrezov

Area
  - Total: 14,277 km^{2} (5,512 sq mi)
  - Rank: 77th

Population (2021 census)
  - Total: 469,865: 44.4% Karachays; 27.5% Russians; 12.7% Cherkess; 8.1% Abazins; 3.7% Nogais; 3.5% other
  - Estimate (2018): 466,305
  - Rank: 74th
  - Density: 32.911/km^{2} (85.238/sq mi)
  - Urban: 41.3%
  - Rural: 58.7%

GDP (nominal, 2024)
  - Total: ₽143 billion (US$1.94 billion)
  - Per capita: ₽305,969 (US$4,154.37)
- Time zone: UTC+3 (MSK)
- ISO 3166 code: RU-KC
- License plates: 09
- OKTMO ID: 91000000
- Official languages: Russian; Abaza, Cherkess (Kabardian), Karachay, Nogai
- Website: http://www.kchr.ru/

Karachay-Cherkessia, (Note: Russian: Карачаево-Черкесия, romanized: Karachayevo-Cherkesiya) officially the Karachay-Cherkess Republic, (Note: Russian: Карачаево-Черкесская Республика, romanized: Karachayevo-Cherkesskaya Respublika; Karachay-Balkar: Къарачай-Черкес Республика, romanized: Qaraçay-Çerkes Respublika; Kabardian: Къэрэшей-Шэрджэс Республика, romanized: Ķêrêšei-Šêrdžês Respublikê; Nogai: Карашай-Шеркеш Республика, romanized: Karaşay-Şerkeş Respublika; Abaza: Къарча-Черкес Республика, romanized: Qarça-Çerkes Respublika) is a republic of Russia located in the North Caucasus. It is administratively part of the North Caucasian Federal District. As of the 2021 census, Karachay-Cherkessia has a population of 469,865. Cherkessk is the largest city and the capital of the republic.

Karachay-Cherkessia is one of Russia's ethnic republics, primarily representing the indigenous Caucasian-Turkic Karachay people and the Cherkess or Circassian people. Karachays form the largest ethnic group at around 44% of the population, followed by ethnic Russians (27%) and Cherkess (13%). The Cherkess are mostly of the Besleney and Kabardin tribes. The republic has five official languages: Russian, Abaza, Cherkess (Kabardian), Karachay-Balkar, and Nogai.

The majority of the republic's territory is within the Caucasus Mountains, except for a small strip at the northern edge of the Don Steppe. Karachay-Cherkessia is bordered by Krasnodar Krai to the west, Stavropol Krai to the north-east, Kabardino-Balkaria to the south-east, and an international border with Georgia to the south-west. Mount Elbrus, the highest mountain in Europe, is located on the border with Kabardino-Balkaria.

== Geography ==
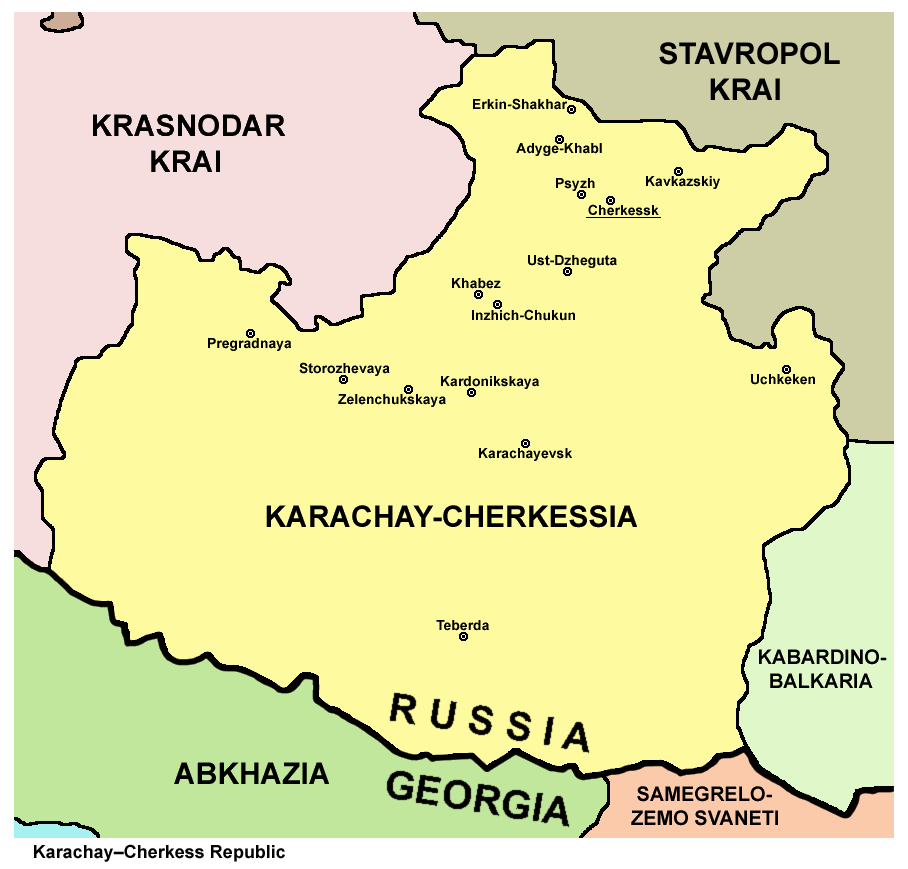
Map of the Karachay-Cherkess Republic.

The republic is located at the slopes of northwestern Caucasus and borders with Krasnodar Krai in the west and northwest, the Kabardino-Balkar Republic in the southeast, Georgia (including Abkhazia) in the south and west, and with Stavropol Krai in the northeast. It stretches for 140 kilometers (87 mi) from north to south and for 170 kilometers (110 mi) from east to west. Mountains cover 80% of the republic's territory; Mount Elbrus, which at 5,642 meters (18,510 ft) is the highest peak in the Caucasus, is located on the republic's border with Kabardino-Balkaria. The republic is rich in water resources. A total of 172 rivers flow through its territory, with the largest one being the Kuban, Bolshoy Zelenchuk, Maly Zelenchuk, Urup, and Laba. There are about 130 mountain lakes of glacial origin and an abundance of mineral springs. Climate is moderate, with short winters and long, warm, humid summers. The average January temperature is −3.2 °C (26.2 °F), and the average July temperature is +20.6 °C (69.1 °F). Average annual precipitation varies from 550 millimeters (22 in) in the plains to 2,500 millimeters (98 in) in the mountains. Natural resources include gold, coal, clays, and more.

Karachay-Cherkessia is the only region in the North Caucasian Federal District that does not have an airport.

== History ==
The Karachay-Cherkess Autonomous Oblast was founded on 12 January 1922, in the early years of the Soviet Union. It was split into Karachay Autonomous Oblast and Cherkess National Okrug on 26 April 1926. The Cherkess National District was elevated to an autonomous oblast status on 30 April 1928.

In November 1943, Karachay Autonomous Oblast was abolished, the Karachay people were accused of collaboration with the Nazis and 70,000 were subsequently deported to the Kazakh and Uzbek republics. Most of the Karachay territory was split between Stavropol Krai and the Georgian SSR. The remaining territory populated by the Cherkessians was known as Cherkess Autonomous Oblast until 9 January 1957 when it was incorporated into Karachay-Cherkess Autonomous Oblast in its former borders due to the rehabilitation of the Karachay.

On 3 July 1991, the autonomous oblast was elevated to the status of the Autonomous Soviet Socialist Republic of Karachay-Cherkessia (under the jurisdiction of the Russian SFSR).

In January 1992, Russian president Boris Yeltsin was prepared to accept the division of Karachay-Cherkessia and introduced draft laws to the Supreme Soviet of Russia for the reconstitution of the Karachai Autonomous Oblast and Cherkess Autonomous Oblast within the Russian Federation. A commission on formation of three autonomous regions – Karachai, Cherkess, and Batalpashinsk – was established in the Supreme Soviet.

On 28 March 1992, a referendum was held in which, according to official results, the majority of the population of Karachay-Cherkessia voted against splitting the republic and, on 9 December 1992, the republic was recognized as the Karachay-Cherkess Republic.

== Politics ==
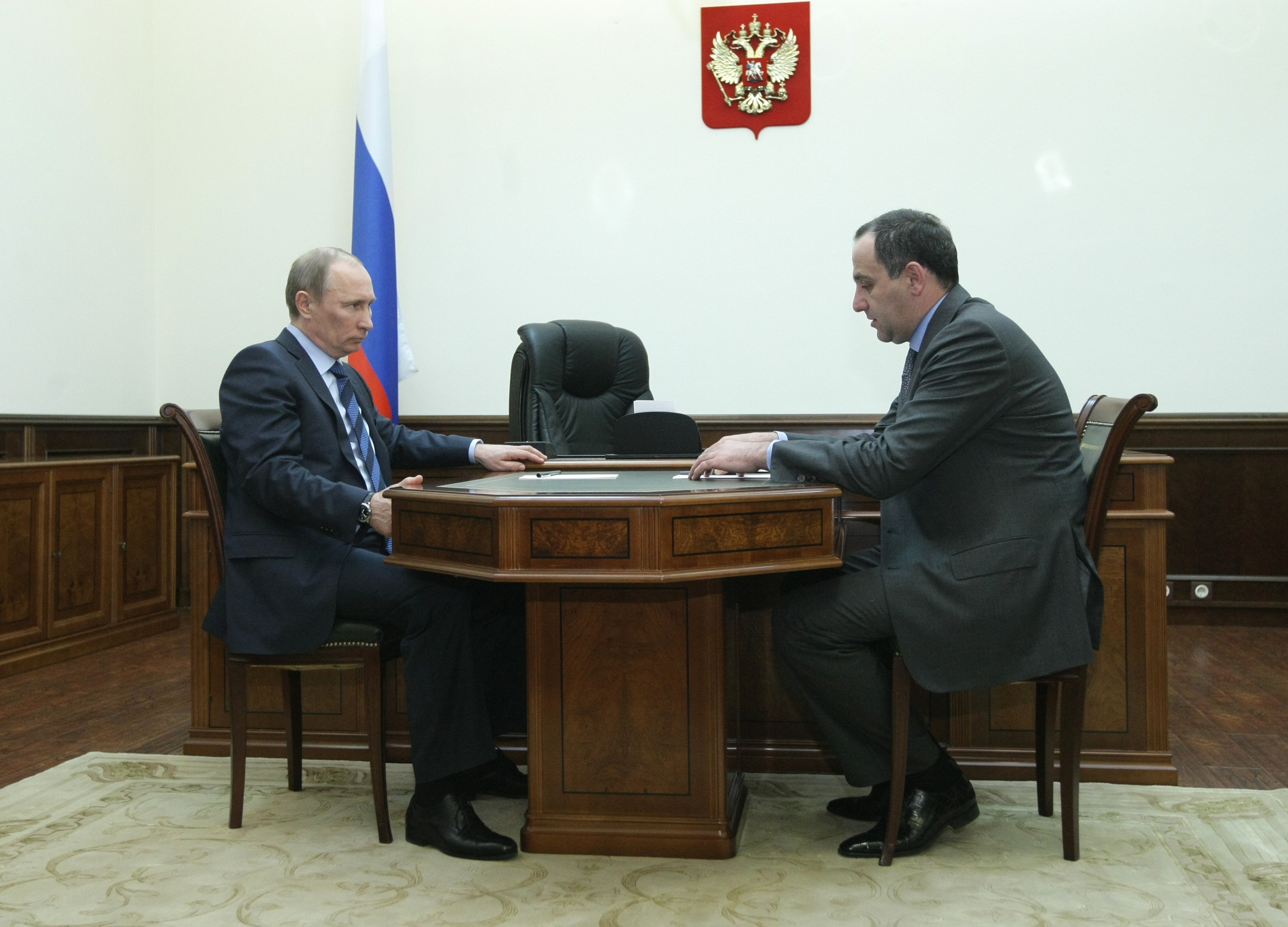
Rashid Temrezov with Vladimir Putin, May 2011

The head of the government in Karachay-Cherkessia is the fead (until 28 June 2012, the official title was "President"). Until February 2011, the president was Boris Ebzeyev, a former judge of the Constitutional Court of Russian Federation. Rashid Temrezov is currently the head of the republic.

Ethnic tension is a considerable problem in the republic. In May 1999, Karachay-Cherkessia conducted its first-ever free regional presidential election. When Vladimir Semyonov, a Karachay, won the election over Stanislav Derev, a Circassian, Derev supporters protested, alleging widespread electoral fraud, with many advocating for the partitioning of the republic. These hostilities deescalated following mediation, led by Moscow, and an independent court review of the election, which upheld the result.

Although activity by separatists in the region pales compared to Chechnya and Dagestan, militant groups exist in Karachay-Cherkessia. A car bomb that killed two people in March 2001 was blamed on Chechen separatists. Muslim separatist groups have formed, and dozens of their members have been killed by the Russian authorities.

In September 2007, the FSB killed ethnic Abazin Rustam Ionov ("Abu-Bakar"), head of the Karachaevo Jamaat (assembly), along with his wife.

== Administrative divisions ==
| Karachay-Cherkess Republic, Russia |
Capital: Cherkessk
As of 2014:
| Number of districts (районы) | 10 |
| Number of cities/towns (города) | 4 |
| Number of urban-type settlements (посёлки городского типа) | 7 |
As of 2002:
| Number of rural localities (сельские населённые пункты) | 139 |
| Number of uninhabited rural localities (сельские населённые пункты без населения) | — |

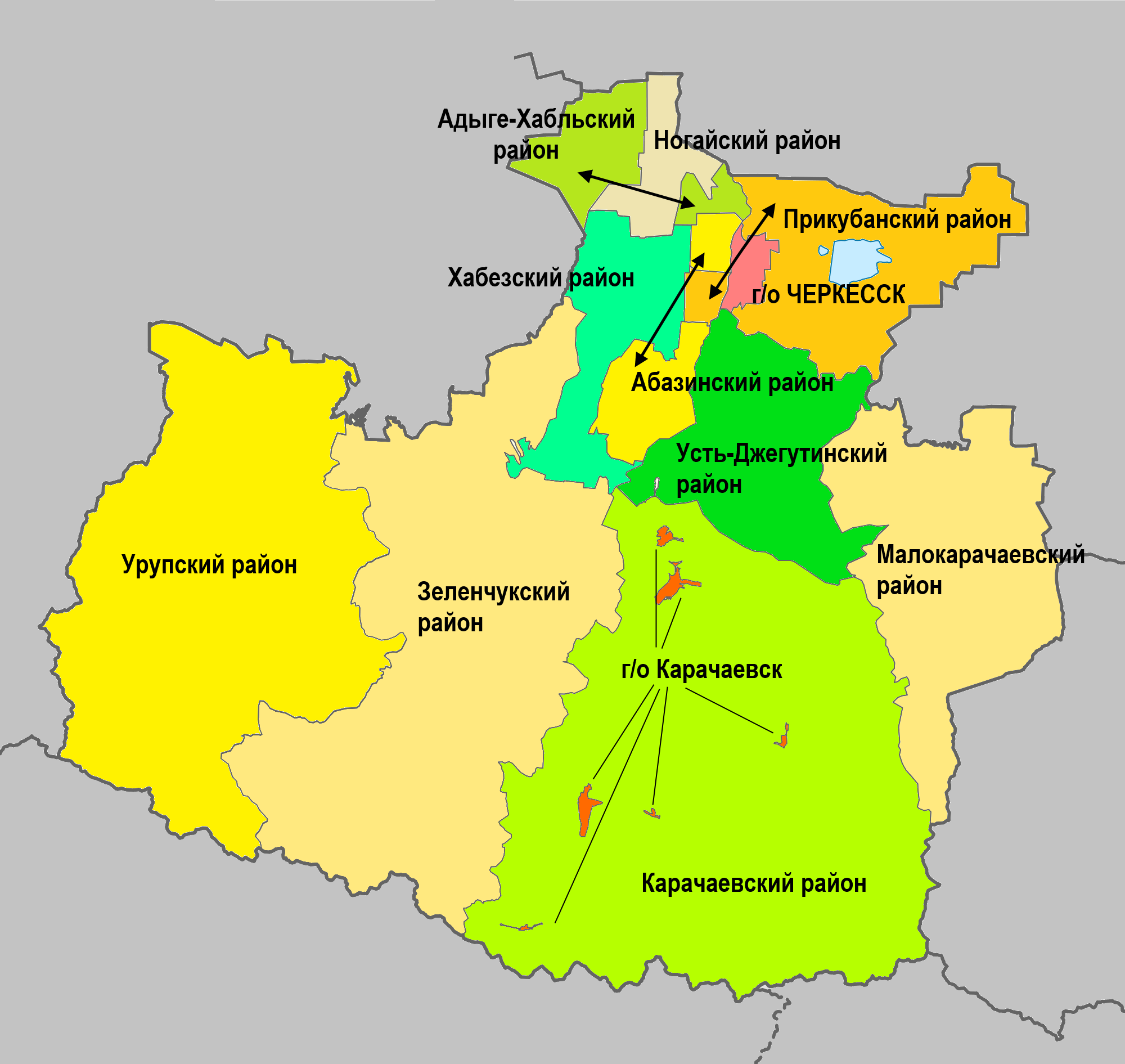
Map of Karachay-Cherkessia

- Cities and towns under republic's jurisdiction
  - Cherkessk (Черкесск) (capital)
  - Karachayevsk (Карачаевск)
    - Towns under the town's jurisdiction:
      - Teberda (Теберда)
    - Urban-type settlements under the town's jurisdiction:
      - Dombay resort settlement (Домбай)
      - Elbrussky (Эльбрусский)
      - Ordzhonikidzevsky (Орджоникидзевский)
- Districts:
  - Abazinsky (Абазинский)
  - Adyge-Khablsky (Адыге-Хабльский)
  - Karachayevsky (Карачаевский)
    - Urban-type settlements under the district's jurisdiction:
      - Novy Karachay (Новый Карачай)
      - Pravokubansky (Правокубанский)
  - Khabezsky (Хабезский)
  - Malokarachayevsky (Малокарачаевский)
  - Nogaysky (Ногайский)
  - Prikubansky (Прикубанский)
    - Urban-type settlements under the district's jurisdiction:
      - Udarny (Ударный)
  - Urupsky (Урупский)
    - Urban-type settlements under the district's jurisdiction:
      - Mednogorsky (Медногорский)
  - Ust-Dzhegutinsky (Усть-Джегутинский)
    - Towns under the district's jurisdiction:
      - Ust-Dzheguta (Усть-Джегута)
  - Zelenchuksky (Зеленчукский)

== Demographics ==
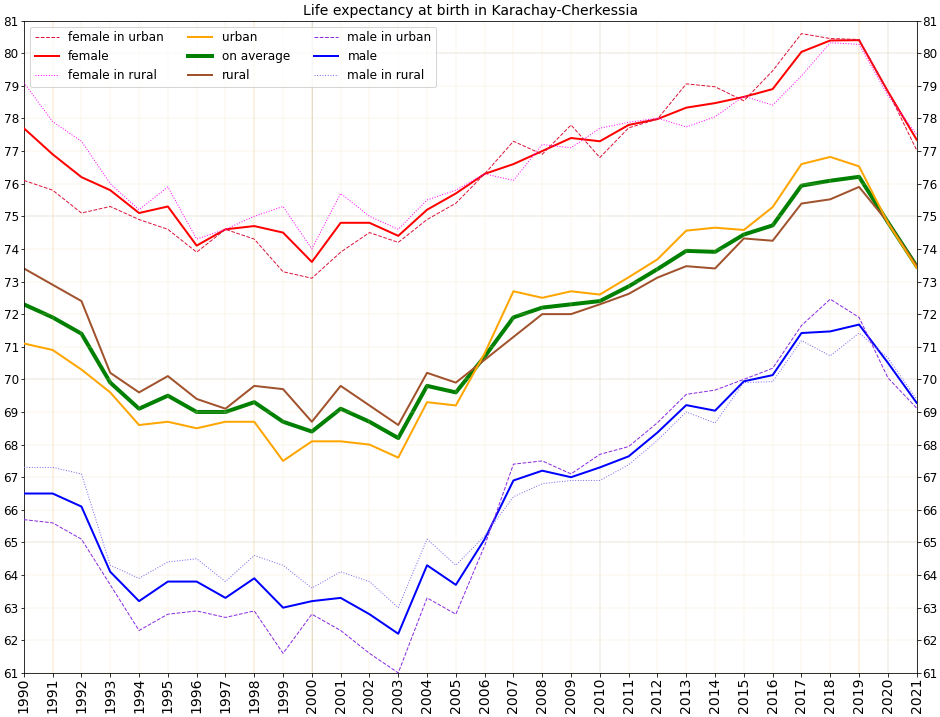
Life expectancy at birth in Karachay-Cherkessia

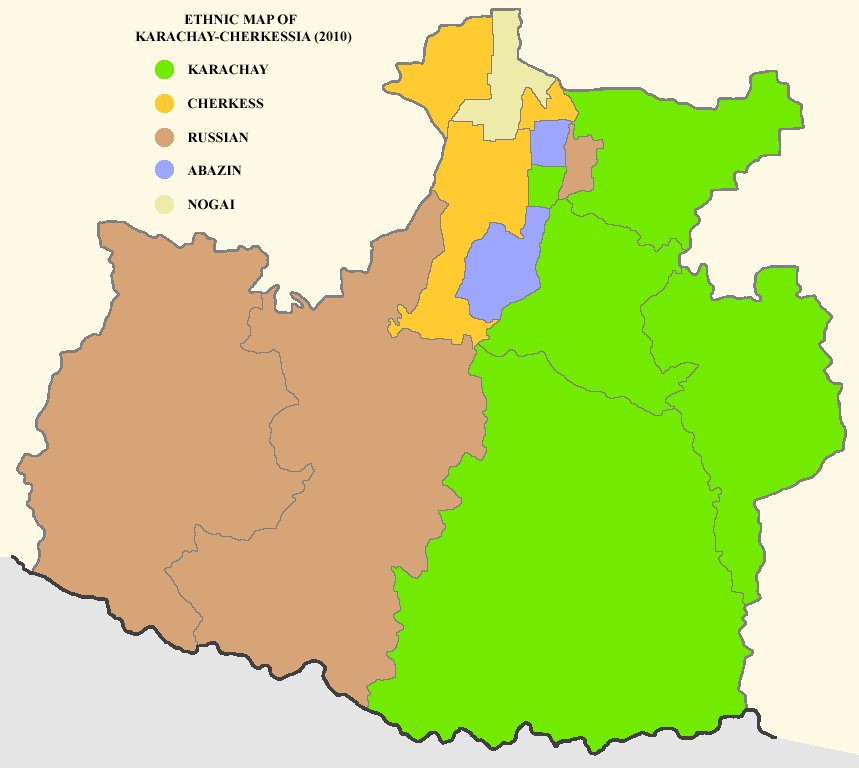
Ethnic map of Karachay-Cherkessia, 2010

Population: 469,865 (2021 census); 477,859 (2010 census); 439,470 (2002 census); 417,560 (1989 Soviet census).

Historical population
| Year | Pop. | ±% |
|---|---|---|
| 1926 | 101,609 | — |
| 1939 | 246,000 | +142.1% |
| 1959 | 277,959 | +13.0% |
| 1970 | 344,651 | +24.0% |
| 1979 | 368,343 | +6.9% |
| 1989 | 417,560 | +13.4% |
| 2002 | 439,470 | +5.2% |
| 2010 | 477,859 | +8.7% |
| 2021 | 469,865 | −1.7% |
Source: Census data

Life expectancy:

| | 2019 | 2021 |
|---|---|---|
| Average: | 76.2 years | 73.5 years |
| Male: | 71.7 years | 69.3 years |
| Female: | 80.4 years | 77.3 years |

=== Vital statistics ===
| | Average population (x 1000) | Live births | Deaths | Natural change | Crude birth rate (per 1000) | Crude death rate (per 1000) | Natural change (per 1000) | Total fertility rate |
|---|---|---|---|---|---|---|---|---|
| 1970 | 346 | 6,021 | 2,153 | 3,868 | 17.4 | 6.2 | 11.2 | |
| 1975 | 357 | 6,619 | 2,288 | 4,331 | 18.5 | 6.4 | 12.1 | |
| 1980 | 373 | 7,044 | 2,794 | 4,250 | 18.9 | 7.5 | 11.4 | |
| 1985 | 394 | 8,119 | 3,350 | 4,769 | 20.6 | 8.5 | 12.1 | |
| 1990 | 422 | 7,218 | 3,496 | 3,722 | 17.1 | 8.3 | 8.8 | |
| 1991 | 427 | 7,145 | 3,713 | 3,432 | 16.7 | 8.7 | 8.0 | |
| 1992 | 431 | 6,846 | 3,915 | 2,931 | 15.9 | 9.1 | 6.8 | |
| 1993 | 433 | 5,569 | 4,336 | 1,233 | 12.9 | 10.0 | 2.8 | |
| 1994 | 434 | 5,786 | 4,598 | 1,188 | 13.3 | 10.6 | 2.7 | |
| 1995 | 437 | 5,633 | 4,501 | 1,132 | 12.9 | 10.3 | 2.6 | |
| 1996 | 439 | 5,281 | 4,683 | 598 | 12.0 | 10.7 | 1.4 | |
| 1997 | 440 | 4,987 | 4,615 | 372 | 11.3 | 10.5 | 0.8 | |
| 1998 | 441 | 4,990 | 4,537 | 453 | 11.3 | 10.3 | 1.0 | |
| 1999 | 441 | 4,523 | 4,707 | −184 | 10.3 | 10.7 | −0.4 | |
| 2000 | 440 | 4,666 | 4,961 | −295 | 10.6 | 11.3 | −0.7 | |
| 2001 | 440 | 4,778 | 4,911 | −133 | 10.9 | 11.2 | −0.3 | |
| 2002 | 440 | 4,927 | 5,207 | −280 | 11.2 | 11.8 | −0.6 | |
| 2003 | 442 | 5,088 | 5,427 | −339 | 11.5 | 12.3 | −0.8 | |
| 2004 | 446 | 5,190 | 5,059 | 131 | 11.6 | 11.3 | 0.3 | |
| 2005 | 450 | 5,194 | 5,131 | 63 | 11.5 | 11.4 | 0.1 | |
| 2006 | 454 | 5,032 | 4,924 | 108 | 11.1 | 10.8 | 0.2 | |
| 2007 | 459 | 6,066 | 4,626 | 1,440 | 13.2 | 10.1 | 3.1 | |
| 2008 | 465 | 6,364 | 4,731 | 1,633 | 13.7 | 10.2 | 3.5 | |
| 2009 | 470 | 6,200 | 4,711 | 1,489 | 13.2 | 10.0 | 3.2 | 1.55 |
| 2010 | 476 | 6,139 | 4,737 | 1,402 | 12.9 | 10.0 | 2.9 | 1.51 |
| 2011 | 477 | 6,289 | 4,664 | 1,625 | 13.1 | 9.7 | 3.4 | 1.54 |
| 2012 | 475 | 6,499 | 4,633 | 1,866 | 13.7 | 9.8 | 3.9 | 1.63 |
| 2013 | 471 | 6,547 | 4,464 | 2,083 | 13.9 | 9.5 | 4.4 | 1.67 |
| 2014 | 470 | 6,318 | 4,553 | 1,765 | 13.5 | 9.7 | 3.8 | 1.65 |
| 2015 | 468 | 5,803 | 4,523 | 1,280 | 12.4 | 9.6 | 2.8 | 1.54 |
| 2016 | 467 | 5,575 | 4,393 | 1,182 | 11.9 | 9.4 | 2.5 | 1.52 |
| 2017 | 466 | 5,145 | 4,346 | 799 | 11.0 | 9.3 | 1.7 | 1.43 |
| 2018 | 465 | 4,974 | 4,137 | 837 | 10.7 | 8.9 | 1.8 | 1.43 |
| 2019 | | 5,050 | 4,219 | 831 | 10.8 | 9.1 | 1.7 | 1.48 |
| 2020 | | 5,135 | 5,034 | 101 | 11.0 | 10.8 | 0.2 | 1.53 |
| 2021 | | 4,470 | 5,677 | -1,207 | 9.6 | 12.2 | -2.6 | 1.35 |
| 2022 | | 4,429 | 4,460 | -31 | 9.5 | 9.6 | -0.1 | 1.30 |
| 2023 | | 4,413 | 3,974 | 439 | 9.4 | 8.5 | 0.9 | 1.34 |
| 2024 | | 4,357 | 4,049 | 308 | 9.3 | 8.6 | 0.7 | 1.34 |

Sources: 1970 to 2008; 2009–2013; 2014–...

=== Ethnic groups ===
According to the 2021 Census, Karachays make up 44.4% of the republic's population, followed by Russians (27.5%), and Cherkess and Abazins together make up 20.8%.

| Ethnic group | 1926 Census^{1} | | 1939 Census | | 1959 Census | | 1970 Census | | 1979 Census | | 1989 Census | | 2002 Census | | 2010 Census | | 2021 Census^{3} | |
| Ethnic group | Number | % | Number | % | Number | % | Number | % | Number | % | Number | % | Number | % | Number | % | Number | % |
|---|---|---|---|---|---|---|---|---|---|---|---|---|---|---|---|---|---|---|
| Karachays | 53,175 | 31.3% | 70,932 | 29.2% | 67,830 | 24.4% | 97,104 | 28.2% | 109,196 | 29.7% | 129,449 | 31.2% | 169,198 | 38.5% | 194,324 | 41.0% | 205,578 | 44.4% |
| Cherkess | 16,186^{2} | 9.5% | 17,667 | 7.3% | 24,145 | 8.7% | 31,190 | 9.0% | 34,430 | 9.4% | 40,241 | 9.7% | 49,591 | 11.3% | 56,466 | 11.9% | 58,825 | 12.7% |
| Abazins | 13,731 | 8.1% | 14,138 | 5.8% | 18,159 | 6.5% | 22,896 | 6.6% | 24,245 | 6.6% | 27,475 | 6.6% | 32,346 | 7.4% | 36,919 | 7.8% | 37,664 | 8.1% |
| Russians | 40,072 | 23.6% | 118,785 | 48.8% | 141,843 | 51.0% | 162,442 | 47.1% | 165,451 | 45.1% | 175,931 | 42.4% | 147,878 | 33.6% | 150,025 | 31.6% | 127,621 | 27.5% |
| Nogais | 6,263 | 3.7% | 6,869 | 2.8% | 8,903 | 3.2% | 11,062 | 3.2% | 11,872 | 3.2% | 12,993 | 3.1% | 14,873 | 3.4% | 15,654 | 3.3% | 17,368 | 3.7% |
| Ukrainians | 32,518 | 19.1% | 4,104 | 1.7% | 4,011 | 1.4% | 4,819 | 1.4% | 4,555 | 1.2% | 6,308 | 1.5% | 3,331 | 0.8% | 1,990 | 0.4% | 787 | 0.2% |
| Others | 8,082 | 4.8% | 10,703 | 4.4% | 13,068 | 4.7% | 15,138 | 4.4% | 17,362 | 4.7% | 22,573 | 5.4% | 22,253 | 5.1% | 18,892 | 4.0% | 15,425 | 3.3% |
^{1} The results of the 1926 census refer to the present territory, which is a combination of the Cherkess ND, the Karachay AO and adjacent areas. The latter areas were mainly inhabited by Russians and Ukrainians.^{2} 13,496 Kabardins and 2,690 other Cherkess.^{3} 6,597 people were registered from administrative databases, and could not declare an ethnicity. It is estimated that the proportion of ethnicities in this group is the same as that of the declared group.

=== Religion ===
Religion in Karachay-Cherkessia as of 2012 (Sreda Arena Atlas)
| Islam | 64% |
| Russian Orthodoxy | 13.2% |
| Spiritual but not religious | 10% |
| Other and undeclared | 6% |
| Atheism and irreligion | 3% |
| Native faiths | 2% |
| Other Christians | 1.8% |

According to a 2012 survey which interviewed 56,900 people, 64% of the population of Karachay-Cherkessia adheres to Islam, 13% to the Russian Orthodox Church, 2% to the Karachay and Circassian native faith, 2% are unaffiliated Christians, unchurched Orthodox Christian believers or members of non-Russian Orthodox churches. In addition, 10% of the population declares to be "spiritual but not religious", 3% are atheist, and 6% are other/undeclared.

=== Notable people ===
- Zuhra Bayramkulova – Dairy farmer and Hero of Socialist Labour.
- Islam Itlyashev – Circassian singer
- Mussa Ekzekov – Businessman
- Arslanbek Sultanbekov – Nogai folk singer

== Science ==
The republic is the home of what was the largest telescope in the world from 1975 until 1993 (the BTA-6), a very large radio telescope (576 meters in diameter, RATAN-600), and the Special Astrophysical Observatory of the Russian Academy of Science dedicated to the study of astronomy. These facilities are located on the bank of the Zelenchuk River, between the villages of Zelenchukskaya and Arkhyz.

== Gallery ==
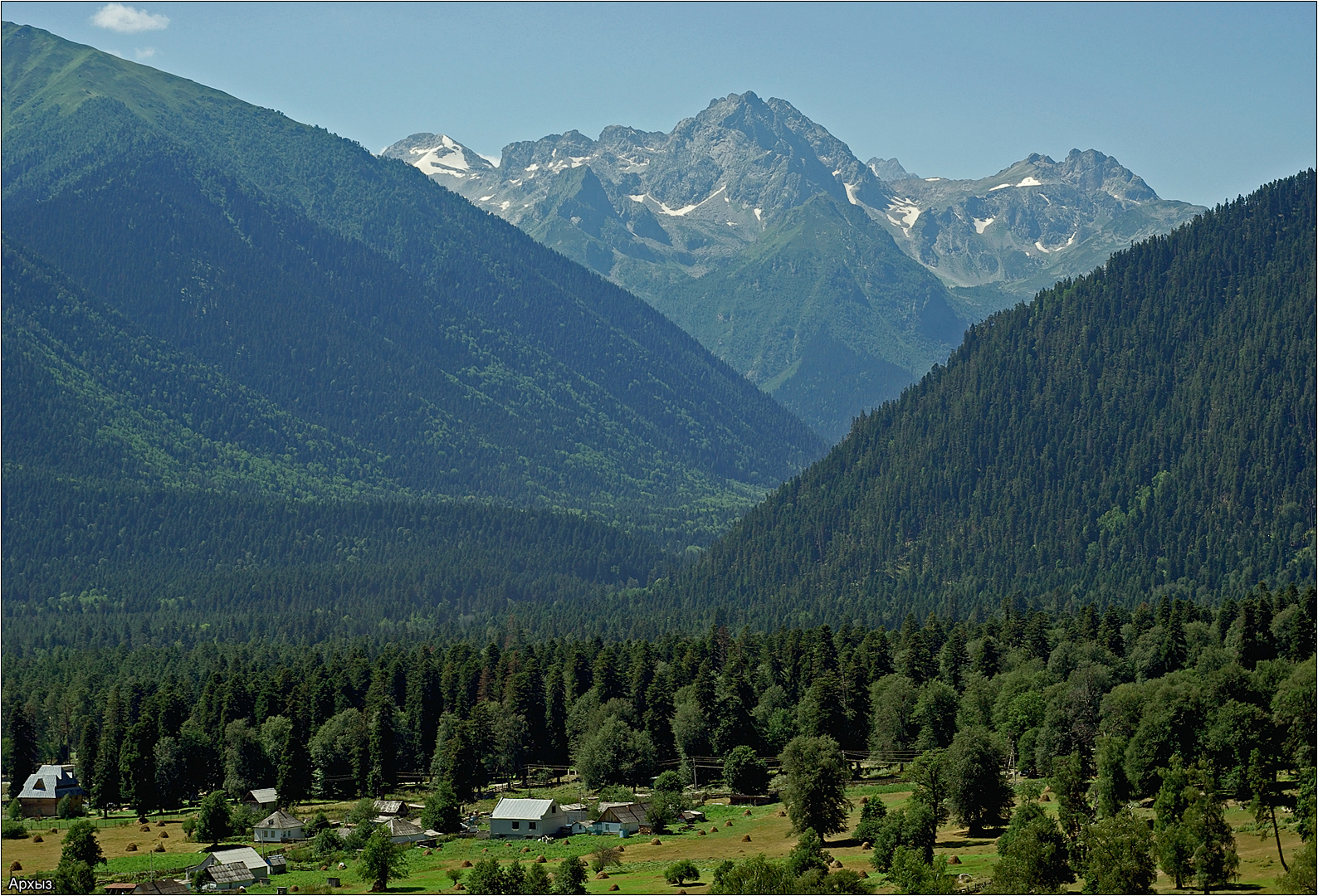
Mountainous landscape of Arkhyz

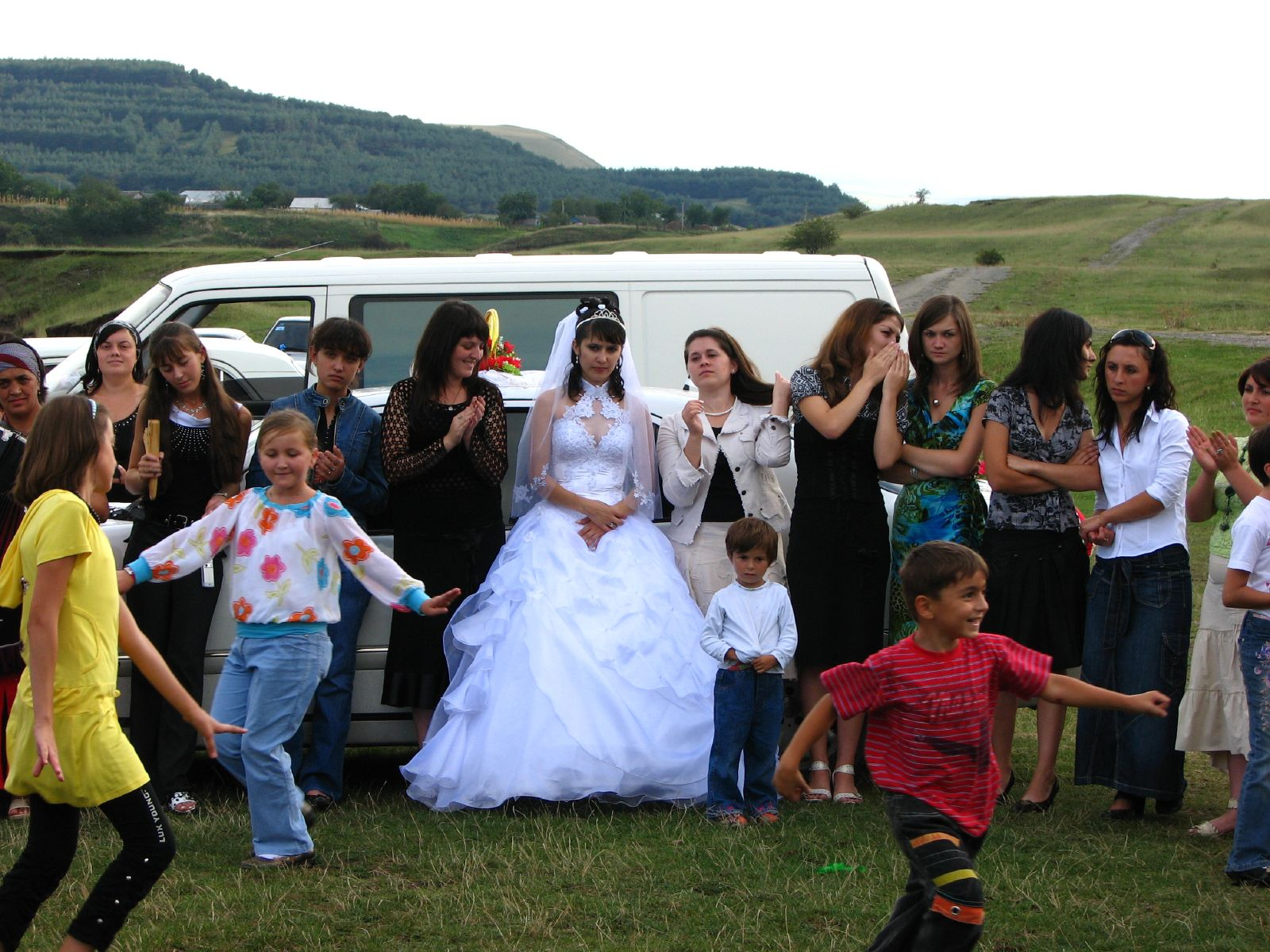
Wedding in Karachay-Cherkessia

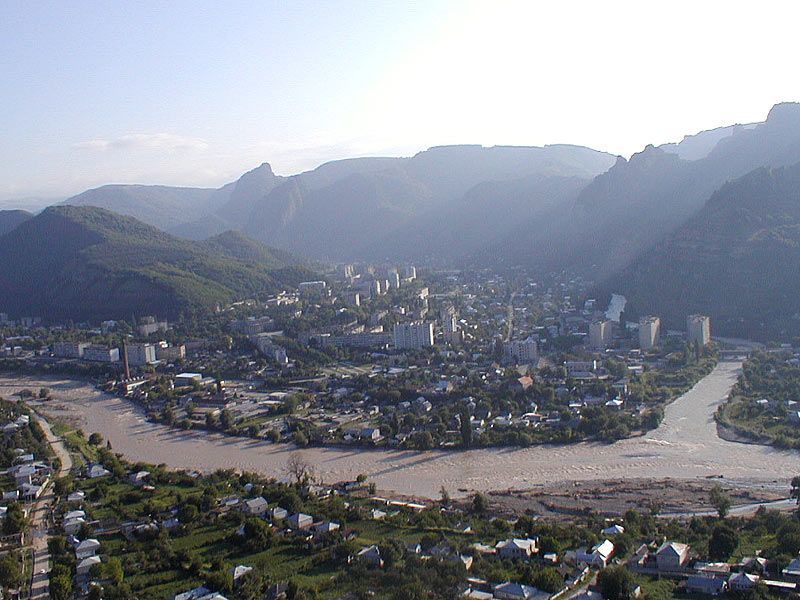
Karachayevsk

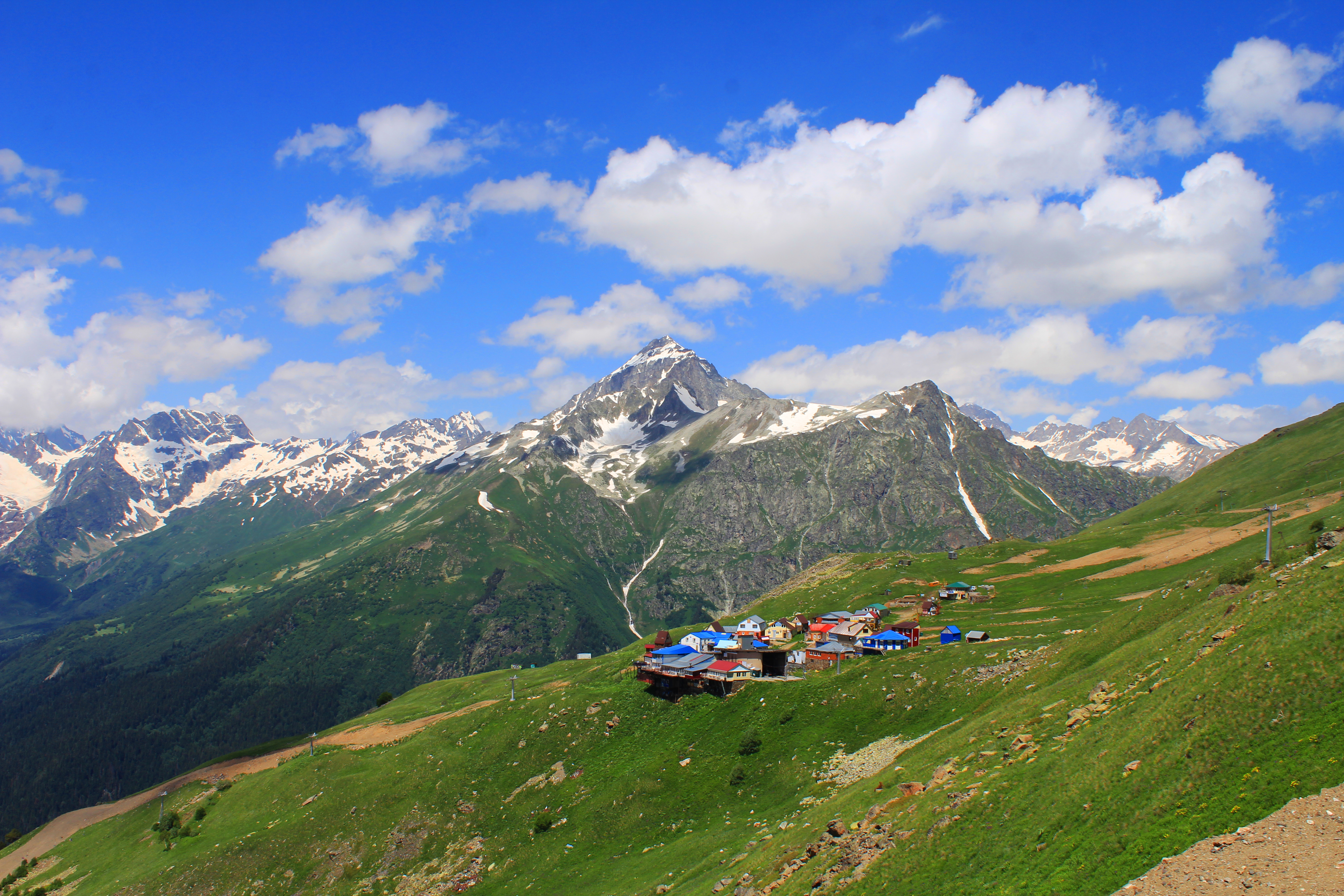
Small settlement in Karachay-Cherkessia

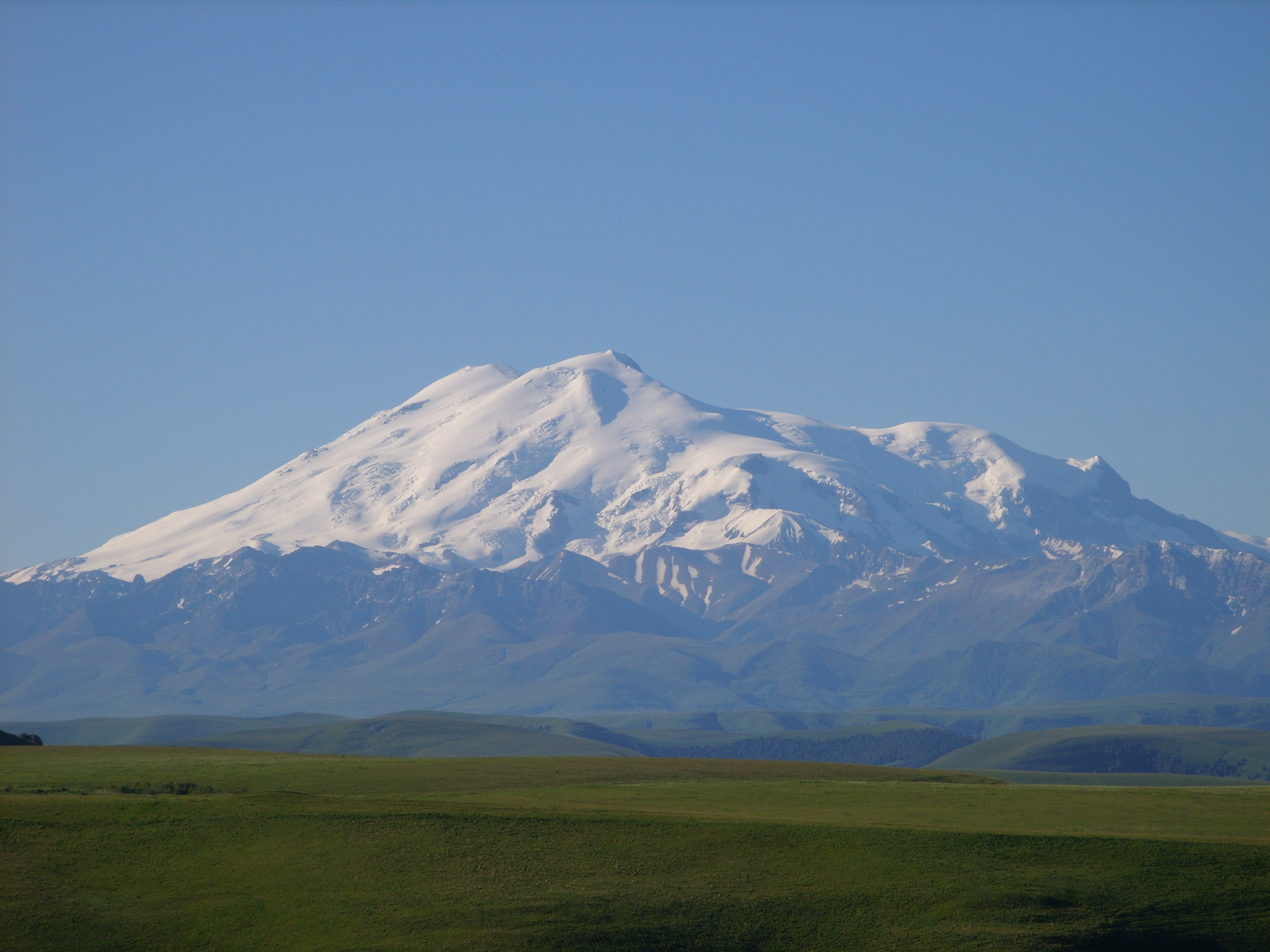
View of Mount Elbrus from Gumbashi Pass (with zoom)

== See also ==
- Abazinia

== Sources ==
- Народное Собрание Карачаево-Черкесской Республики. Закон №410-XXII от 9 апреля 1998 г. «О государственном гимне Карачаево-Черкесской Республики», в ред. Закона №85-РЗ от 6 декабря 2013 г. «О внесении изменений в отдельные законодательные акты Карачаево-Черкесской Республики в связи с установлением административной ответственности за неправомерное использование государственных символов Карачаево-Черкесской Республики». Вступил в силу с момента опубликования, за исключением статей 2 и 3, вступающих в силу с 15 мая 1998 г.. Опубликован: "День Республики", №48(15471), 25 апреля 1998 г. (People's Assembly of the Karachay-Cherkess Republic. Law #410-XXII of 9 April 1998 On the State Anthem of the Karachay-Cherkess Republic, as amended by the Law #85-RZ of 6 December 2013 On Amending Various Legislative Acts of the Karachay-Cherkess Republic Due to the Introduction of Administrative Sanctions for Misuse of the Symbols of the Karachay-Cherkess Republic. Effective as of the moment of publication, with the exception of Articles 2 and 3, which take effect on 15 May 1998.).
- 5 марта 1996 г. «Конституция Карачаево-Черкесской Республики», в ред. Конституционного Закона №49-РКЗ от 27 июня 2012 г. «О внесении изменений в Конституцию Карачаево-Черкесской Республики». Вступил в силу со дня официального опубликования. Опубликован: "Сборник Законов и Постановлений КЧР 1995–1999 гг", Часть I. (March 5, 1996 Constitution of the Karachay-Cherkess Republic, as amended by the Constitutional Law #49-RKZ of June 27, 2012 On Amending the Constitution of the Karachay-Cherkess Republic. Effective as of the day of the official publication.).
- Верховный Совет РСФСР. Закон №1539-I от 3 июля 1991 г. «О порядке преобразования Адыгейской, Горно-Алтайской, Карачаево-Черкесской и Хакасской автономных областей в Советские Социалистические Республики в составе РСФСР». (Supreme Soviet of the RSFSR. Law #1539-I of 3 July 1991 On the Process of Transformation of Adyghe, Mountain Altai, Karachay-Cherkess, and Khakass Autonomous Oblasts into Soviet Socialist Republics Within the RSFSR. ).
