= Islam Itlyashev =

Russian singer (born 1991)

Islam Itlyashev Ислам Итляшев
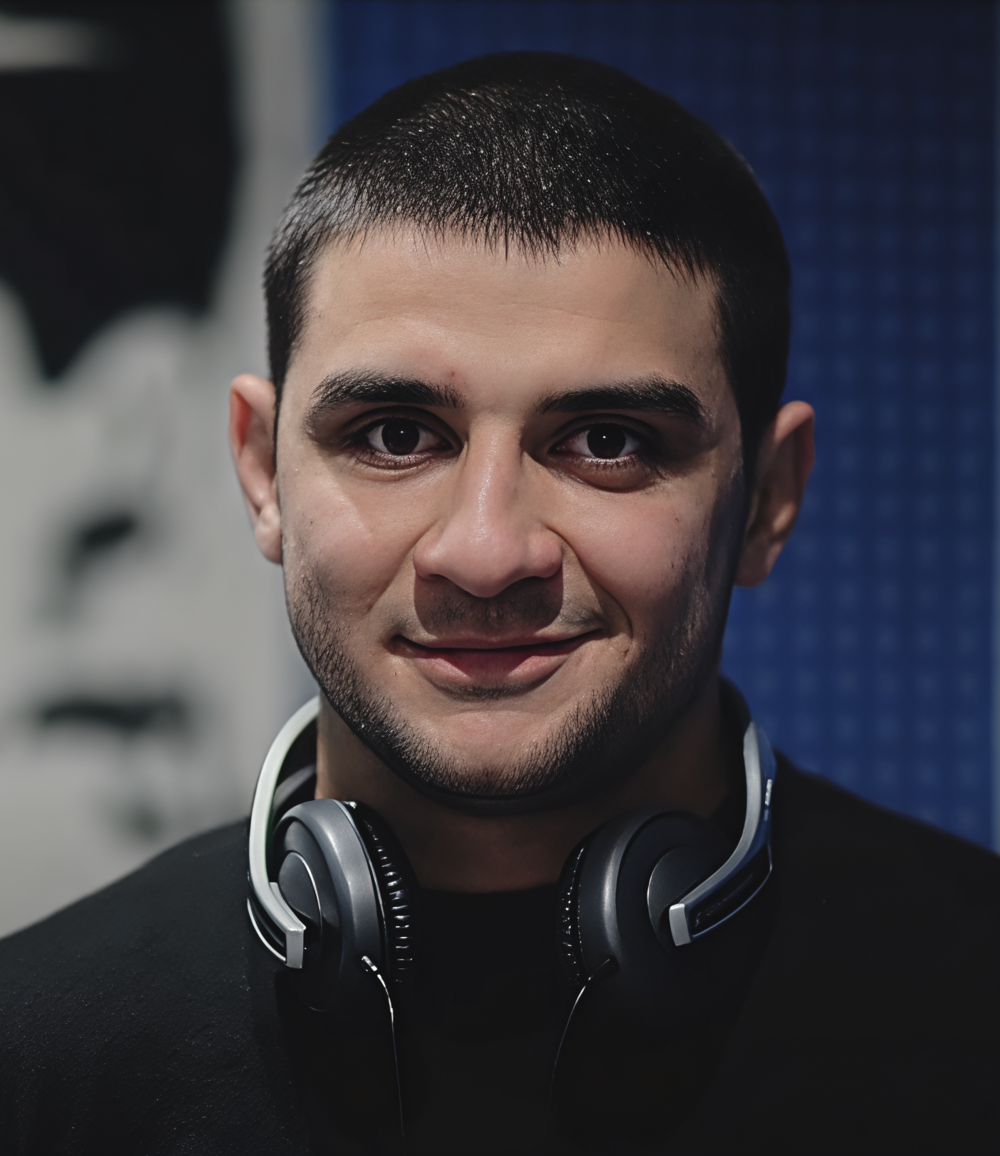
- Itlyashev in 2017.

Background information
- Born: Hadzhiislam Vladimirovich Itlyashev; October 5, 1991 (age 34); Cherkessk, USSR
- Genres: Pop; Russian chanson
- Occupations: singer; songwriter
- Years active: 2011-present
- Label: Zvuk-M

Islam (Hadzhiislam) Vladimirovich Itlyashev (Russian: Хаджиисла́м Влади́мирович Итля́шев; born 5 October 1991, Cherkessk, Karachay-Cherkess Autonomous Oblast, USSR) is a Russian singer and songwriter of Circassian descent. He sings in the genre of pop & Russian chanson. Itlyashev is the 2022 honored artist of the Karachay-Cherkessk Republic.

In 2022, Itlyashev was the most streamed artist of the year on YouTube in Russia. Itlyashev rose to prominence with the music video of his 2019 song, "Salam aleikum bratyam" (Салам алейкум братьям), where he, with "guys representing the peoples of North Caucasus" dance traditional Lezginka in the street.

Itlyashev has collaborated with another Caucasian artist, Sultan Laguchev.

== Biography ==
In 2011, Itlyashev made his music debut with the single "Милана".

In 2018, Itlyashev released his debut album "Ты полюбила хулигана", consisting of 16 compositions.

In 2022, he performed a duet with Irina Krug.

Itlyashev is known for his provocative statements.

== Family ==
Islam has an older brother, Hasan, who practiced sambo, hand-to-hand combat and also MMA.

Itlyashev is married and has five children.

== Awards ==
- 2016 — Award "Серебряный кувшин" (Artist of the year in the Karachay-Cherkessk Republic)
- 2022 — "Honored artist of the Karachay-Cherkessk Republic"
- 2023 — Award "Chanson of the year" — for the song — "Ресторан".
