= Yasyn-Sokan =

Yasyn-Sokan Ясын-Сокан
- Selo
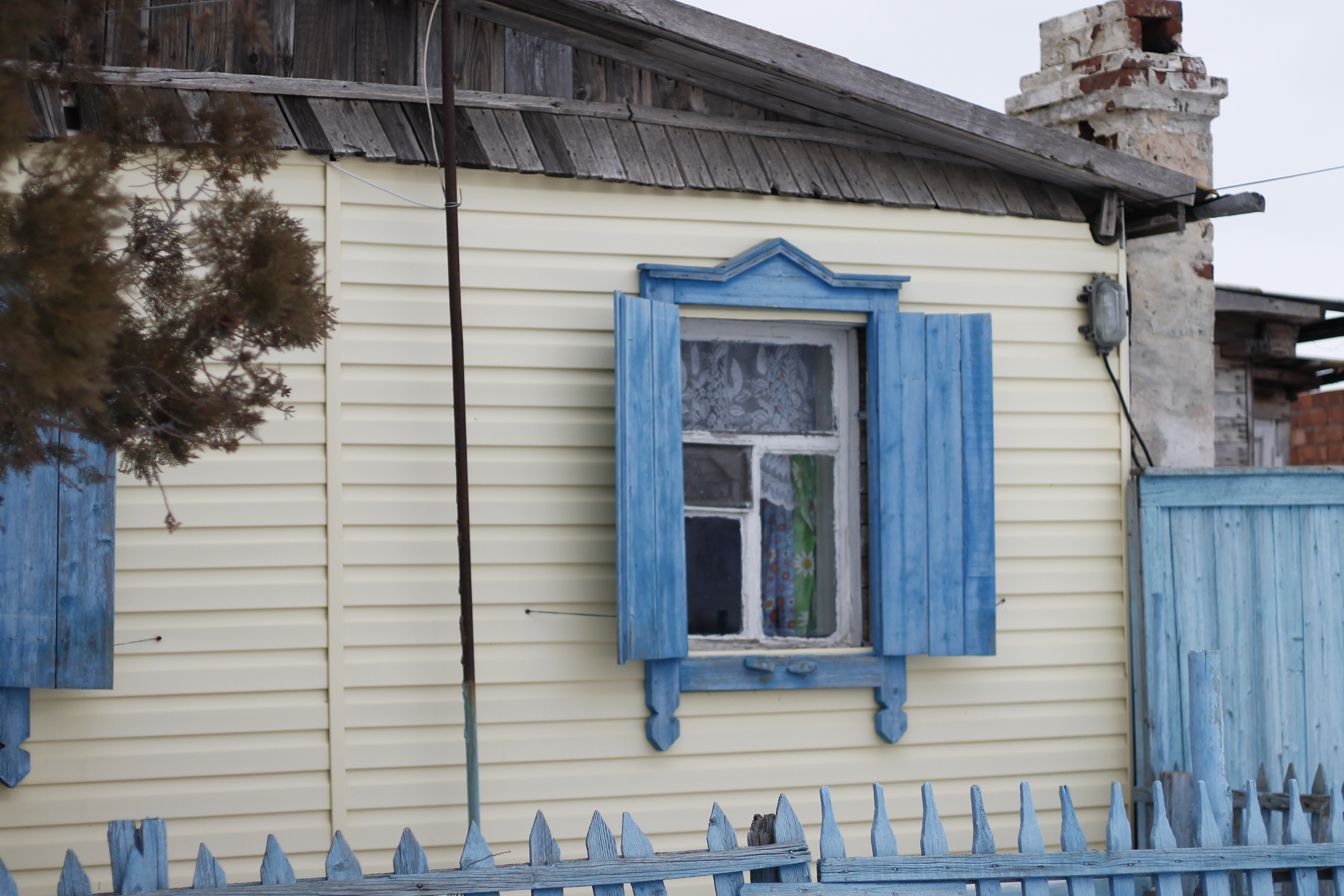
- Interactive map of Yasyn-Sokan
- Location within Astrakhan Oblast Location within Russia
- Coordinates: 46°39′N 48°07′E
- Country: Russia
- Region: Astrakhan Oblast
- District: Krasnoyarsky District
- Time zone: UTC+4:00

Yasyn-Sokan (Russian: Ясын-Сокан) is a rural locality (a selo) in Dzhanaysky Selsoviet, Krasnoyarsky District, Astrakhan Oblast, Russia. The population was 556 as of 2010. There are 2 streets.

== Geography ==
Yasyn-Sokan is located 26 km northwest of Krasny Yar (the district's administrative centre) by road. Vyatskoye is the nearest rural locality.
