= Nogai language =

Kipchak Turkic language of the North Caucasus

Nogai
- Noghay, Nogay
- ногай тили, nogay tili, نوعای تلىُ, نوعاي ٴتىلى ногайша, nogayşa, نوعایشا
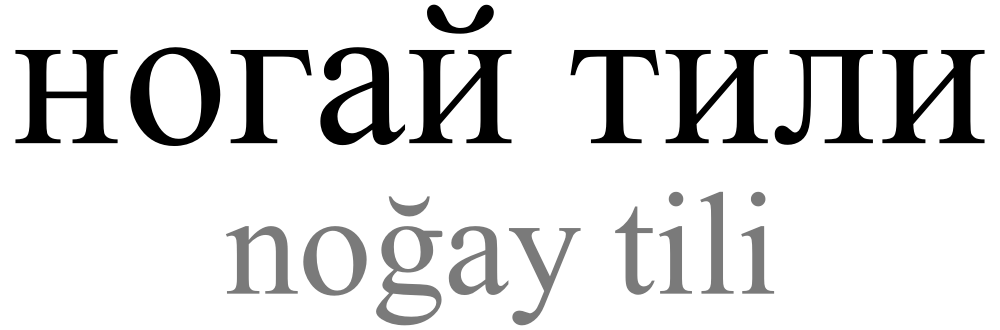
- Nogai written in Cyrillic and Latin scripts
- Native to: Russia, Turkey, Kazakhstan, Ukraine, Uzbekistan
- Region: Caucasus (Nogaysky District, Dagestan and Nogaysky District, Karachay-Cherkess Republic)
- Ethnicity: 108,000 Nogais (2020 census)
- Native speakers: 86,000 (2020 census)
- Language family: Turkic: Common Turkic; Kipchak; Kipchak–Nogai; Nogai
- Writing system: Cyrillic, Latin

Official status
- Official language in: Russia: Dagestan; Karachay-Cherkessia

Language codes
- ISO 639-2: nog
- ISO 639-3: nog
- Glottolog: noga1249
- ELP: Noghay
- Alabugat Tatar
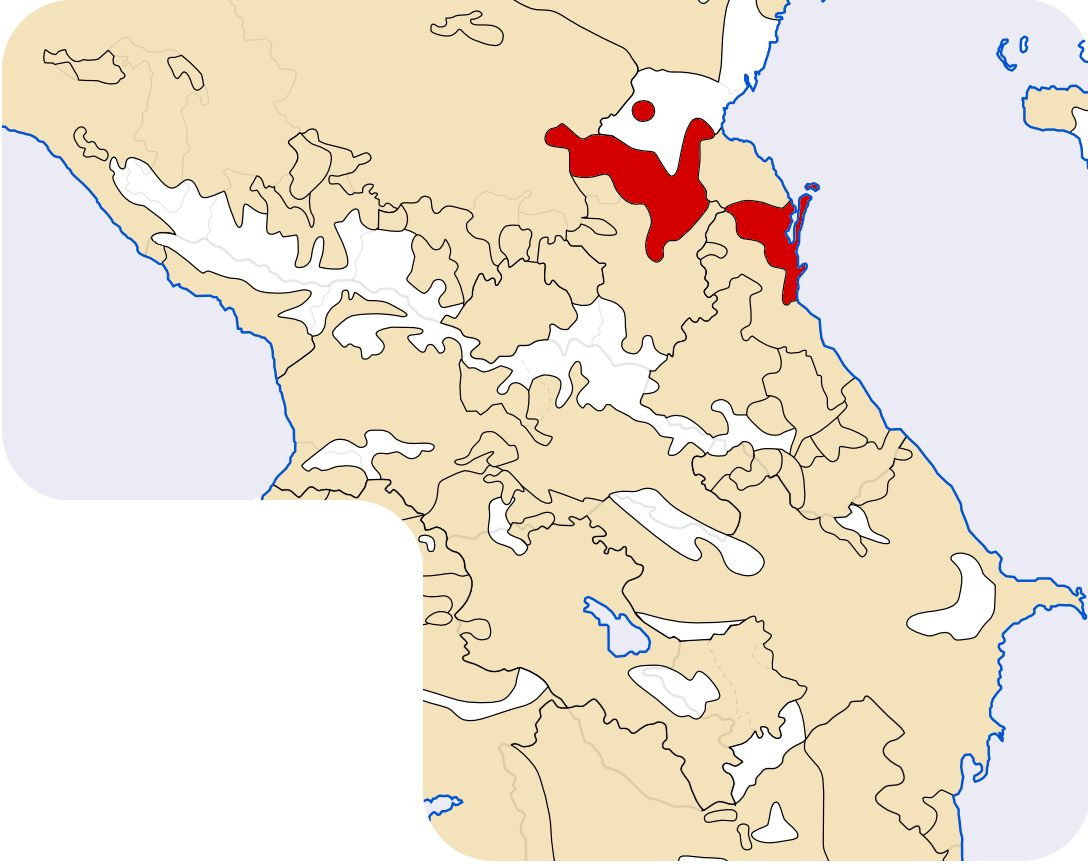
- Map of Nogais in the Caucasus

- Nogai is classified as Definitely Endangered by the UNESCO Atlas of the World's Languages in Danger.

Linguistic map of the Caucasus region: Nogay is spoken in the pale blue areas, numbered "26".

Nogai (/noʊˈɡaɪ/ noh-GHY; Ногай тили, Nogay tili, Ногайша, Nogayşa) also known as Noğay, Noghay, Nogay, or Nogai Tatar, is a Turkic language spoken in Southern Russia, Kazakhstan, Uzbekistan, and Turkey. It is the ancestral language of the Nogais. As a member of the Kipchak branch, it is closely related to Kazakh, Karakalpak and Crimean Tatar. In 2014, the first Nogai novel (Akşa Nenem) was published, written in the Latin alphabet.

== Classification ==
Nogai is generally classified into the Kipchak–Nogai branch of Kipchak Turkic. The latter also includes the steppe dialect of Crimean Tatar, the Tobol-Irtysh dialect of the Siberian Tatar in Russia, Kazakh in Kazakhstan, and the Karakalpak and Kipchak dialects of Uzbek in Uzbekistan.

Three distinct dialects are recognized:

- Karanogay or Qara-Nogai (literally "Black Nogai"; "Northern Nogai"), spoken in Dagestan and Chechnya.
- Central Nogai or Nogai Proper, in Stavropol.
- Aqnogai (White or Western Nogai), by the Kuban River, its tributaries in Karachay–Cherkessia, and in the Mineralnye Vody District. Qara-Nogai and Nogai Proper are very close linguistically, whereas Aqnogai is more different. However, all three are mutually intelligible.

Outside of the southern Caucasus, other varieties exist that are either considered dialects or distinct languages:

- Nogais in Bulgaria, Romania, and Turkey have Ottoman Turkish influences.
- Astrakhan Nogai, with the following three varieties:
  - Karagash (also known as Kundrov Tatar)
  - Yurt Tatar or Yurt Nogai
  - Alabugat Tatar or Alabugat Nogai (also known as Utar)

== History ==
The Nogais, descended from the peoples of the Golden Horde, take their name and that of their language from the grandson of Genghis Khan, Nogai Khan, who ruled the nomadic people west of the Danube toward the end of the 13th century. They then settled along the Black Sea coast of present-day Ukraine.

Historically, Nogai was a spoken language. When speakers wanted to write, they utilized the Kypchak or Chagatai languages, which were similar to Nogai and were written in the Perso-Arabic script. In 1928, a Latin alphabet was introduced. It was devised by the Nogai academic Abdul-Khamid Shershenbievich Dzhanibekov (Djanibek), following principles adopted for all Turkic languages.

In 1938, a transition to the Cyrillic alphabet began. The orthography based on the Latin alphabet was alleged to impede learning Russian.

The expulsion of the Nogais from Ukraine in the nineteenth century separated Nogai speakers into several geographically isolated groups. Some went to Turkey and Romania, while others stayed within the Russian Empire, settling in northern Dagestan and neighbouring areas of Chechnya and Stavropol Kray.

The Nogai language has disappeared very rapidly in Turkey. Today, it is mostly spoken by the older generation; however, there are still younger speakers, as there are some villages in Turkey where it is a common mode of communication. In the Soviet Union, the language of instruction in schools was Russian, and the number of speakers declined there also. Recent estimates place the total number of Nogai speakers at about 80,000.

In 1973, two small Nogai-language newspapers were being published, one in Karachay–Cherkessia and another in the Dagestan Autonomous SSR (Ленин йолы), but most speakers never heard of these publications, and the papers did not reach Nogai villages.

Nogai is now part of the school curriculum from the 1st to the 10th year in the Nogai District of Dagestan. It is also taught at the Karachayevo-Cherkess Pedagogical School and the national branch of the Pedagogical Institute.

== Phonology ==
Vowels
	Front	Back
Close	i, y	ɯ, u
Mid	e	o
Open	æ, œ	a

Consonants
	Labial	Alveolar	Palatal	Velar	Uvular
Plosive	p, b	t, d		k, ɡ	q
Fricative	(f, v)	s, z	ʃ, ʒ		χ, ʁ
Affricate		(ts)	(tʃ), dʒ		
Nasal	m	n		ŋ	
Liquid		l, r			
Approximant	w		j		

Phonemes in parentheses indicate sounds that appear in loanwords.

== Alphabet ==
There are four stages in the history of Nogai writing:

- before 1920s – unwritten; Kypchak and/or Chagatai was used instead with the Perso-Arabic script
- 1926–1928 – standardized Arabic script specific to Nogai language
- 1928–1938 – writing based on the Latin alphabet
- from 1938 – writing based on the Cyrillic alphabet

The Nogai alphabet based on Cyrillic was created in 1938. It included all of the Russian alphabet letters except Ё ё, and also the digraphs Гъ гъ, Къ къ, Нъ нъ. The digraphs Оь оь, Уь уь were added in the same year. In 1944 the digraphs Гъ гъ, Къ къ were excluded from the alphabet.

The last reform of the Nogai writing took place in 1960, when, as a result of discussions at the Karachay-Cherkessia Research Institute, Language and Literature, the letters Аь аь and Ё ё were added to it. After that, the Nogai alphabet took its present form.

Modern Nogai alphabet
А а	Аь аь	Б б	В в	Г г	Д д	Е е	Ё ё	Ж ж	З з
И и	Й й	К к	Л л	М м	Н н	Нъ нъ	О о	Оь оь	П п
Р р	С с	Т т	У у	Уь уь	Ф ф	Х х	Ц ц	Ч ч	Ш ш
Щ щ	Ъ ъ	Ы ы	Ь ь	Э э	Ю ю	Я я
