= Babayurtovsky District =

Babayurtovsky District Бабаюртовский район (Russian)
- District

Other transcription(s)
  - Kumyk and Nogay: Бабав-юрт якъ
  - Avar: Бабаюрт мухъ
  - Dargwa: Бабаюртла къатI
  - Chechen: Бабаюртан кIошт
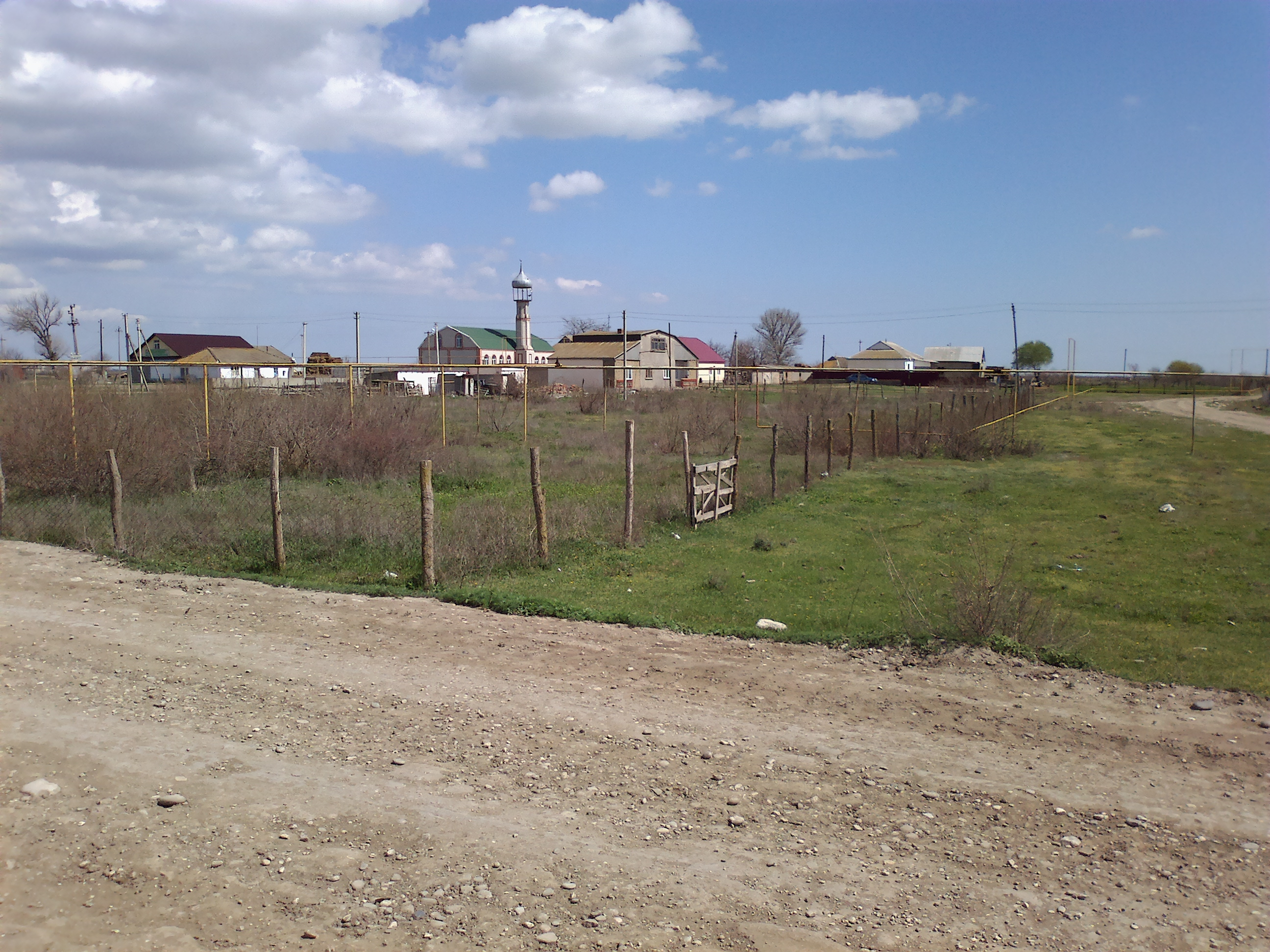
- Village of Shava, Babayurtovsky District

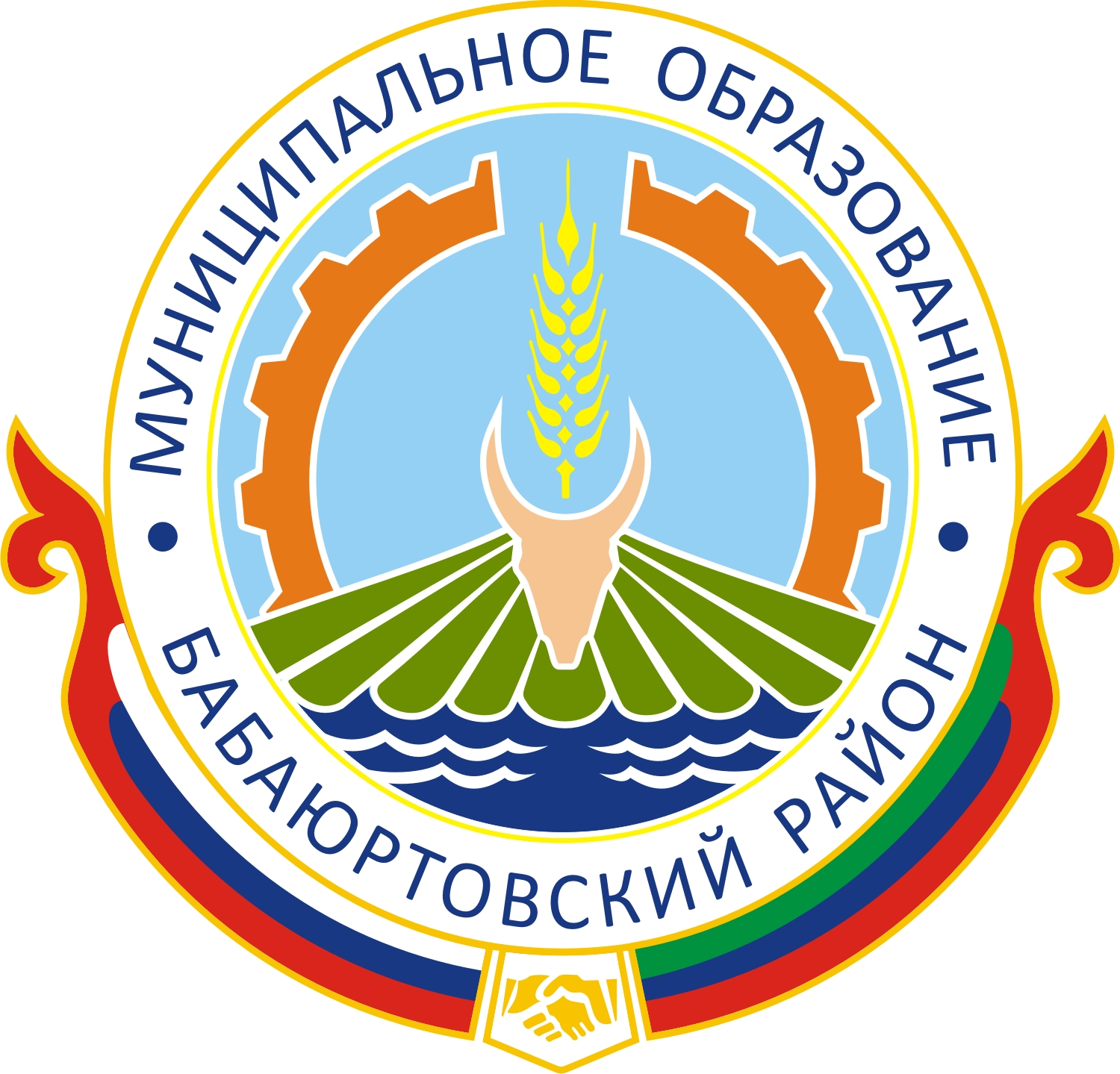
- Coat of arms
- Location of Babayurtovsky District in the Republic of Dagestan
- Coordinates: 43°40′N 47°00′E
- Country: Russia
- Federal subject: Republic of Dagestan
- Established: 1928
- Administrative center: Babayurt

Area
  - Total: 3,262.3 km^{2} (1,259.6 sq mi)

Population (2010 Census)
  - Total: 45,701
  - Density: 14.009/km^{2} (36.283/sq mi)
  - Urban: 0%
  - Rural: 100%

Administrative structure
  - Administrative divisions: 7 Selsoviets
  - Inhabited localities: 22 rural localities

Municipal structure
  - Municipally incorporated as: Babayurtovsky Municipal District
  - Municipal divisions: 0 urban settlements, 15 rural settlements
- Time zone: UTC+3 (MSK)
- OKTMO ID: 82607000
- Website: http://president.e-dag.ru/novosti/content/34-babayurtovskiy-rayon/

Population of Babayurtovsky District
- 2010 Census: 45,701
- 2002 Census: 41,331
- 1989 Census: 42,320
- 1979 Census: 37,760

Babayurtovsky District (Russian: Бабаю́ртовский райо́н; Kumyk: Бабав-юрт якъ, romanized: Babaw-yurt yaq; Nogai: Бабав-юрт якъ, romanized: Babaw-yurt yaq) is an administrative and municipal district (raion), one of the forty-one in the Republic of Dagestan, Russia. It is located in the northern central part of the republic. The area of the district is 3,262.3 square kilometers (1,259.6 sq mi). Its administrative center is the rural locality (a selo) of Babayurt. As of the 2010 Census, the total population of the district was 45,701, with the population of Babayurt accounting for 33.3% of that number.

== Administrative and municipal status ==
Within the framework of administrative divisions, Babayurtovsky District is one of the forty-one in the Republic of Dagestan. The district is divided into seven selsoviets which comprise twenty-two rural localities. As a municipal division, the district is incorporated as Babayurtovsky Municipal District. Its seven selsoviets are incorporated as fifteen rural settlements within the municipal district. The selo of Babayurt serves as the administrative center of both the administrative and municipal district.
