= Babayurt =

Rural locality in Dagestan, Russia

Coordinates: 43°35′59″N 46°46′25″E

Babayurt (Russian: Бабаюрт, Kumyk: Бабав-юрт) is a rural locality (a selo) and the administrative center of Babayurtovsky District of the Republic of Dagestan, Russia. Population: 15,227 (2010 census); 12,943 (2002 census); 12,737 (1989 Soviet census).

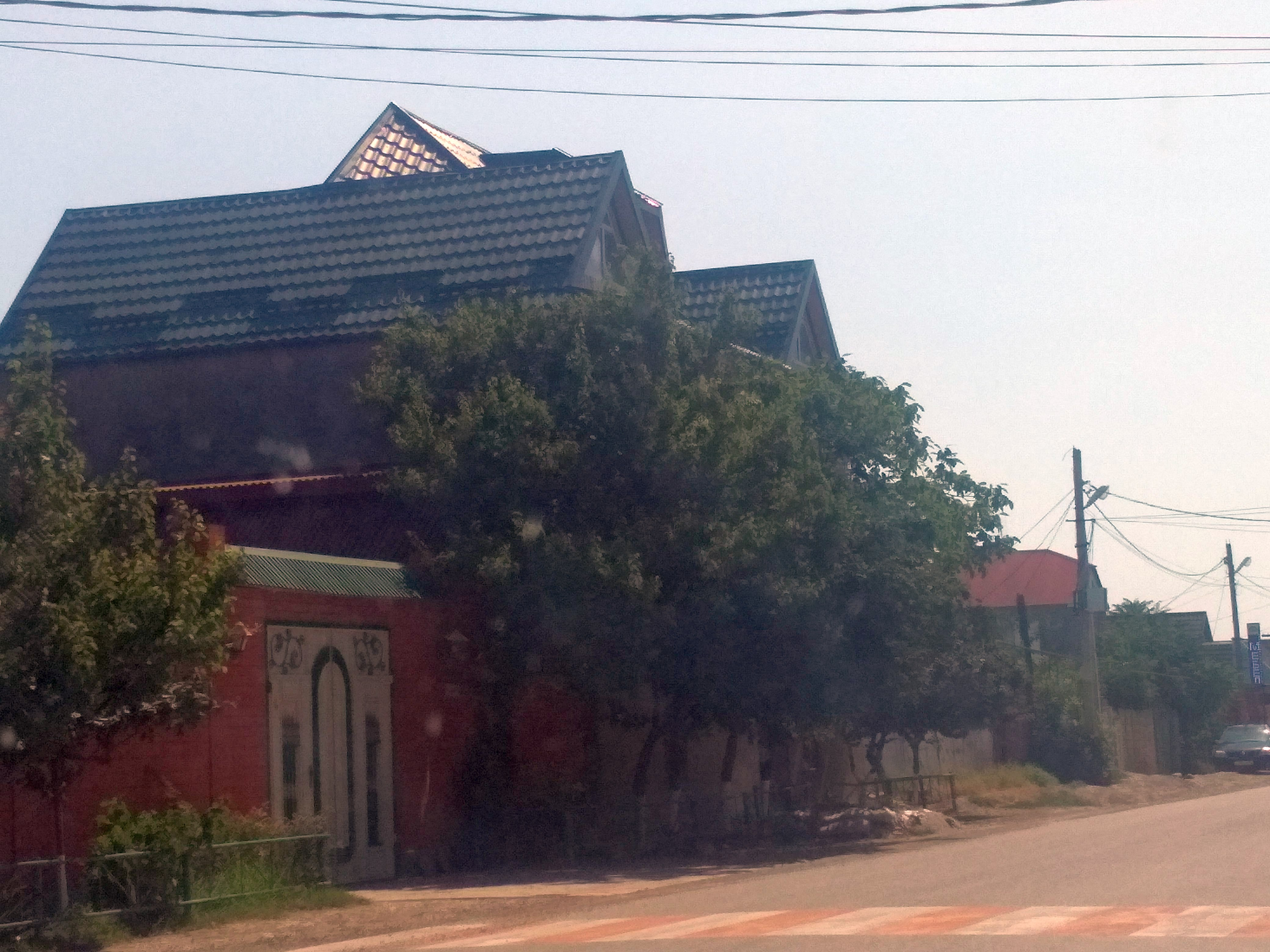
Babayurt Lenina street

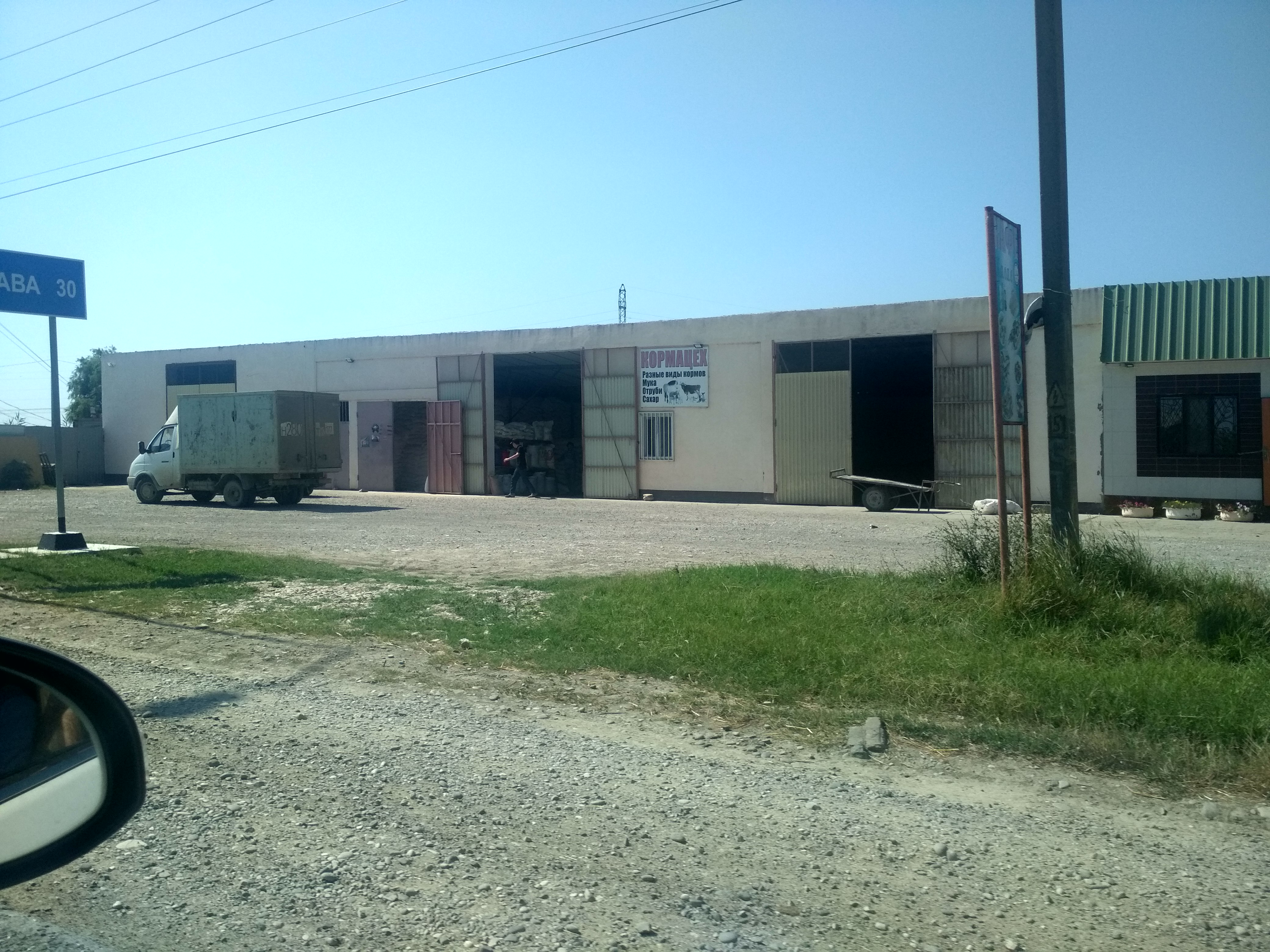
Outskirts of Babayurt
