= Unecha constituency =

Russian legislative constituency

Unecha single-member constituency
- Constituency of the Russian State Duma

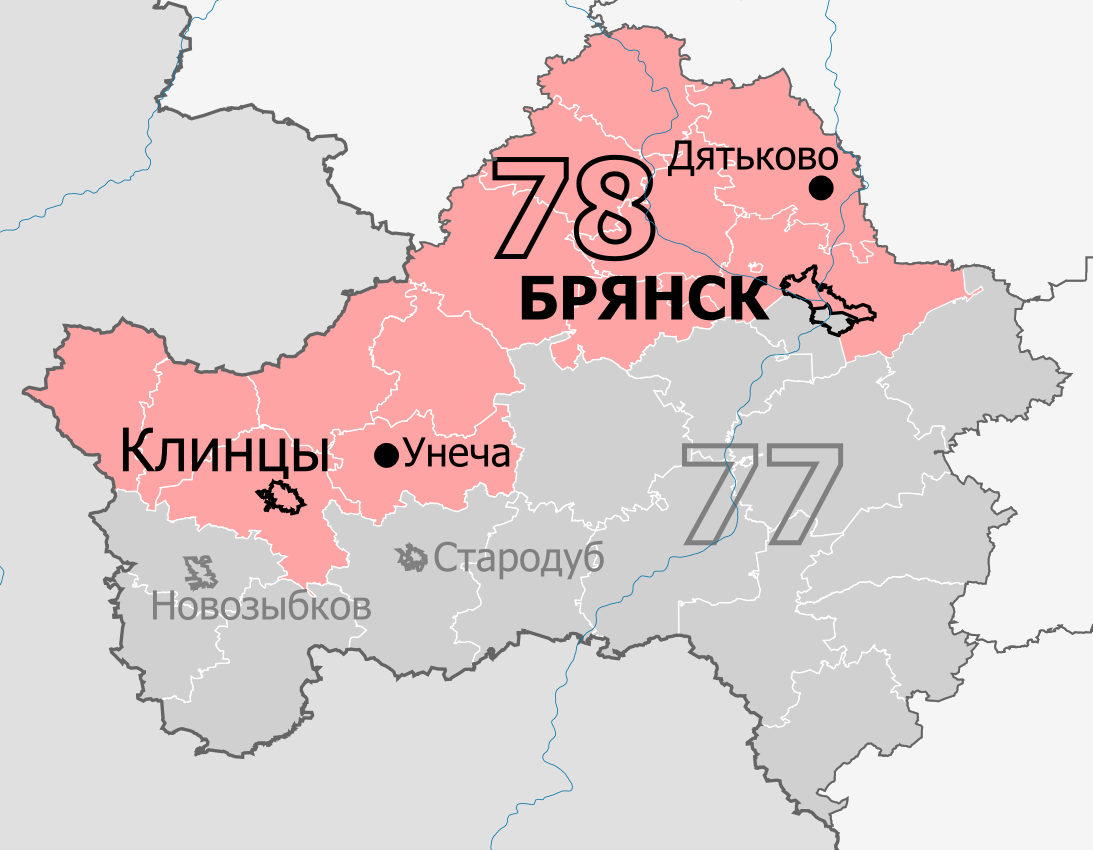
- Constituency boundaries since 2016
- Deputy: Oleg Matytsin; United Russia
- Federal subject: Bryansk Oblast
- Districts: Bryansk (Bezhitsky, Volodarsky), Bryansky (Chernetovskoe, Domashovskoe, Glinishchevskoe, Netyinskoe, Novodarkovichskoe, Novoselskoe, Otradnenskoe, Paltsovskoe, Steklyannoraditskoe, Zhurinichskoe), Dubrovsky, Dyatkovsky, Gordeyevsky, Kletnyansky, Klintsovsky, Klintsy, Krasnogorsky, Mglinsky, Rognedinsky, Seltso, Surazhsky, Unechsky, Zhiryatinsky, Zhukovsky
- Voters: 454,674 (2026)

The Unecha constituency (No.82 (Note: Pochep constituency No.66 in 1993-1995, Pochep constituency No.65 in 1995-2003, Pochep constituency No.67 in 2003-2007, No.78 in 2016–2026)) is a Russian legislative constituency in Bryansk Oblast. The constituency covers northern Bryansk and northern Bryansk Oblast.

The constituency has been represented since 2024 by United Russia deputy Oleg Matytsin, former Minister of Sport of Russia, who won the open seat after United Russia deputy Nikolay Alekseyenko resigned in May 2024. Matytsin has been Chairman of the Duma Committee on Sport and Physical Culture since his election in September 2024.

== Boundaries ==
1993–2007 Pochep constituency: Gordeyevsky District, Dubrovsky District, Kletnyansky District, Klimovsky District, Klintsovsky District, Klintsy, Krasnogorsky District, Mglinsky District, Novozybkov, Novozybkovsky District, Pochep, Pochepsky District, Pogarsky District, Rognedinsky District, Starodubsky District, Surazhsky District, Suzemsky District, Trubchevsky District, Unechsky District, Vygonichsky District, Zhiryatinsky District, Zhukovsky District, Zlynkovsky District
The constituency covered rural Bryansk Oblast to the west of Bryansk, including the cities of Klintsy, Novozybkov and Pochep.

2016–present: Bryansk (Bezhitsky, Volodarsky), Bryansky District (Betovo, Domashovo, Glinishchevo, Netyinka, Novosyolki, Novye Darkovichi, Otradnoye, Paltso, Steklyannaya Raditsa, Zhurinichi), Dubrovsky District, Dyatkovsky District, Gordeyevsky District, Kletnyansky District, Klintsovsky District, Klintsy, Krasnogorsky District, Mglinsky District, Rognedinsky District, Seltso, Surazhsky District, Unechsky District, Zhiryatinsky District, Zhukovsky District
The constituency was re-created for the 2016 election under the name "Unecha constituency". It retained its northern half, losing the rest to Bryansk constituency. This seat instead gained northern Bryansk, its suburbs and northeastern Bryansk Oblast from Bryansk constituency.

== Members elected ==
Election	Member	Party
1993	Oleg Shenkaryov	Communist Party
1995	Oleg Shenkaryov	Communist Party
1999	Pyotr Rogonov	Communist Party
2003	Vasily Semenkov	United Russia
2007	Proportional representation - no election by constituency	
2011	Proportional representation - no election by constituency	
2016	Valentina Mironova	United Russia
2021	Nikolay Alekseyenko (Note: resigned in May 2024)	United Russia
2024	Oleg Matytsin	United Russia
2026	Oleg Matytsin	United Russia

== Election results ==
=== 1993 ===
Summary of the 12 December 1993 Russian legislative election in the Pochep constituency
Candidate	Party	Votes	%
Oleg Shenkaryov	Communist Party	117,436	32.95%
Vladimir Prudnikov	Dignity and Charity	61,398	17.22%
Fyodor Gosporyan	Independent	36,778	10.32%
Pyotr Yefimenko	Agrarian Party	33,825	9.49%
Viktor Leskov	Independent	23,342	6.55%
Sergey Zakharkin	Future of Russia–New Names	12,420	3.48%
Vladimir Veremyov	Russian Democratic Reform Movement	9,487	2.66%
against all		31,432	8.82%
invalid ballots		29,008	8.14%
Total		356,448	100%
Registered voters/turnout		520,045	68.54%

=== 1995 ===
Summary of the 17 December 1995 Russian legislative election in the Pochep constituency
Candidate	Party	Votes	%
Oleg Shenkaryov (incumbent)	Communist Party	135,159	35.73%
Gennady Lemeshov	Liberal Democratic Party	69,070	18.26%
Ivan Nesterov	Independent	30,292	8.01%
Georgy Kondratyev	Duma-96	23,746	6.28%
Nadezhda Garbuzova	Agrarian Party	17,432	4.61%
Vasily Kopylov	Forward, Russia!	17,246	4.56%
Lyudmila Komogortseva	Democratic Choice of Russia – United Democrats	13,600	3.60%
Aleksey Voronin	Our Home – Russia	13,460	3.56%
Nikolay Yakubovich	Trade Unions and Industrialists – Union of Labour	13,079	3.46%
Vitaly Kozin	Independent	11,073	2.93%
Pyotr Gaponenko	Independent	6,134	1.62%
Sergey Akhremenko	League of Independent Scientists	3,409	0.90%
Stanislav Zhuravsky	Independent	2,892	0.76%
against all		15,415	4.08%
Total		378,260	100%

=== 1999 ===
Summary of the 19 December 1999 Russian legislative election in the Pochep constituency
Candidate	Party	Votes	%
Pyotr Rogonov	Communist Party	145,674	43.58%
Ivan Nesterov	Independent	27,640	8.27%
Oleg Shenkaryov (incumbent)	Independent	27,168	8.13%
Nikolay Simonenko	Independent	23,049	6.90%
Nikolay Pozhilenkov	Independent	14,347	4.29%
Dmitry Kovalev	Independent	14,062	4.21%
Valentin Parachev	Andrey Nikolayev and Svyatoslav Fyodorov Bloc	10,873	3.25%
Oleg Aniskov	Independent	7,802	2.33%
Igor Shchigolev	Our Home – Russia	5,847	1.75%
Aleksandr Demidov	Russian Socialist Party	5,144	1.54%
Mikhail Mamonov	Russian Cause	4,983	1.49%
Anatoly Shpuntov	Independent	3,782	1.13%
Aleksandr Tovkalo	Independent	3,688	1.10%
Valery Tarakanov	Independent	3,356	1.00%
Aleksandr Barsukov	Independent	2,189	0.65%
against all		28,271	8.46%
Total		334,282	100%

=== 2003 ===
Results by district: Vasily Semenkov: 20–30% 30–40% 40–50% 50–60%; Pyotr Rogonov: 20–30% 30–40% 40–50%

Summary of the 7 December 2003 Russian legislative election in the Pochep constituency
Candidate	Party	Votes	%
Vasily Semenkov	United Russia	96,734	36.11%
Pyotr Rogonov (incumbent)	Communist Party	75,006	28.00%
Lidia Blokhina	Independent	18,240	6.81%
Andrey Bocharov	Party of Russia's Rebirth-Russian Party of Life	15,837	5.91%
Nikolay Zhdanov-Lutsenko	Liberal Democratic Party	10,973	4.10%
Oleg Shenkaryov	People's Party	8,829	3.30%
Vasily Popik	Independent	7,841	2.93%
Aleksandr Bobkov	Agrarian Party	7,367	2.75%
Nina Moganova	United Russian Party Rus'	1,597	0.60%
against all		19,758	7.38%
Total		268,033	100%

=== 2016 ===
Summary of the 18 September 2016 Russian legislative election in the Unecha constituency
Candidate	Party	Votes	%
Valentina Mironova	United Russia	158,125	60.03%
Andrey Arkhitsky	Communist Party	32,745	12.43%
Viktor Kiselyov	Liberal Democratic Party	26,007	9.87%
Ivan Medved	Rodina	19,073	7.24%
Aleksandr Medvedkov	A Just Russia	10,156	3.86%
Olga Makhotina	Yabloko	5,080	1.93%
Sergey Gorelov	Party of Growth	3,763	1.43%
Vadim Kanichev	Patriots of Russia	2,795	1.06%
Total		263,411	100%

=== 2021 ===
Summary of the 17-19 September 2021 Russian legislative election in the Unecha constituency
Candidate	Party	Votes	%
Nikolay Alekseyenko	United Russia	188,442	57.73%
Andrey Arkhitsky	Communist Party	52,834	16.19%
Vitaly Minakov	A Just Russia — For Truth	40,099	12.28%
Roman Romanyuk	Liberal Democratic Party	11,116	3.41%
Viktor Grinkevich	Rodina	9,107	2.79%
Aleksandr Feskov	Party of Pensioners	6,263	1.92%
Aleksey Shcherbenko	New People	5,176	1.59%
Olga Makhotina	Yabloko	5,016	1.54%
Aleksey Nazarov	Party of Growth	2,710	0.83%
Total		326,422	100%

=== 2024 ===
Summary of the 6–8 September 2024 by-election in the Unecha constituency
Candidate	Party	Votes	%
Oleg Matytsin	United Russia	180,650	68.01%
Andrey Arkhitsky	Communist Party	32,432	12.21%
Ruslan Titov	Liberal Democratic Party	20,626	7.76%
Aleksey Timoshkov	A Just Russia – For Truth	13,721	5.17%
Sergey Gorelov	New People	13,541	5.10%
Total		204,566	100%

=== 2026 ===
Summary of the 18-20 September 2026 Russian legislative election in the Unecha constituency
Candidate	Party	Votes	%
Oleg Matytsin (incumbent)	United Russia	239,089	65.03%
Igor Firsov	Communist Party	32,865	8.94%
Sergey Gorelov	New People	30,056	8.18%
Artyom Litvinov	Liberal Democratic Party	26,829	7.30%
Aleksey Timoshkov	A Just Russia	26,446	7.19%
Aleksandr Anishchenko	The Greens	8,034	2.19%
Total		367,655	100%
