= Flag of Bryansk Oblast =

Bryansk Oblast
- Proportion: 2:3
- Adopted: 5 November 1998
- Design: A burgundy field defaced with the coat of arms of the Bryansk Oblast in the center

The flag of the Bryansk Oblast in Russia consists of a burgundy field defaced with the oblasts' coat of arms in the center. It was officially approved on 5 November 1998.

The flag's field is burgundy, the same color of the banners the Red Army and guerrilla fighters flew during the liberation of Bryansk in World War II.

Its ratio is 1:1.5, and its proportion is 2:3.

== Flags ==
=== Historical ===
Flag	Years of use	Government	Description
	1941–1944	Lokot Autonomy	A white field with the emblem of the Lokot Republic in the canton, Saint George and the Dragon appear in the fly side of the flag.

=== Administrative ===
Flag	Date	Use	Description
	October 2016–present	Flag of Bryansk city	
	April–October 2016	Flag of Bryansk city	
	1998–April 2016	Flag of Bryansk city	
	?–present	Flag of Fokino	
	2019–?	Flag of Fokino	
	2024–present	Flag of Klintsy	
	2006–2024	Flag of Klintsy	
	2018–present	Flag of Novozybkov	
	2002–2018	Flag of Novozybkov	
	2005–2026	Flag of Seltso	
	2026–present	Flag of Seltso	
	2017–present	Flag of Brasovsky District	
	2002–present	Flag of Bryansky District	
	2007–present	Flag of Dubrovsky District	
	2019–present	Flag of Dyatkovsky District	
	2007–present	Flag of Gordeyevsky District	
	2008–2026	Flag of Karachevsky District	
	2026–present	Flag of Karachevsky District	
	2025–present	Flag of Kletnyansky District	
	2005–present	Flag of Klimovsky District	
	2023–present	Flag of Klintsovsky District	
	1999–2023	Flag of Klintsovsky District	
	2000s–present	Flag of Komarichsky District	
	2025–present	Flag of Krasnogorsky District	
	2025–present	Flag of Mglinsky District	
	2002–2026	Flag of Navlinsky District	
	2026–present	Flag of Navlinsky District	
	2010–present	Flag of Novozybkovsky District	
	2025–present	Flag of Pogarsky District	
	2001–2026	Flag of Pochepsky District	
	2026–present	Flag of Pochepsky District	
	2021–present	Flag of Sevsky District	
	2011–present	Flag of Starodubsky District	
	2024–present	Flag of Surazhsky District	
	2006–2026	Flag of Suzemsky District	
	2026–present	Flag of Suzemsky District	
	2019–present	Flag of Trubchevsky District	
	2025–present	Flag of Unechsky District	
	2025–present	Flag of Vygonichsky District	
	2025–present	Flag of Zhiryatinsky District	
	2023–present	Flag of Zhukovsky District	
	2019–present	Flag of Zlynkovsky District	

=== Settlements ===
Flag	Date	Use	Description
	2018–present	Flag of Arkinskoye	
	2023–present	Flag of Brakhlovskoye	
	2018–present	Flag of Bykhovskoye	
	2023–present	Flag of Chelkhovskoye	
	2023–present	Flag of Churovichskoye	
	2024–present	Flag of Degtyarevskoye	
	2024–present	Flag of Dubrovskoye	
	2020–present	Flag of Dyatkovskoye	
	2023–present	Flag of Gulevskoye	
	2018–present	Flag of Igritskoye	
	2023–present	Flag of Istopskoye	
	2023–present	Flag of Kamenskokhutorskoye	
	2023–present	Flag of Kirillovskoye	
	2018–present	Flag of Komarichi	
	2023–present	Flag of Korzhovka-Golubovka	
	2023–present	Flag of Khoromenskoye	
	2023–present	Flag of Lakomobudskoye	
	2023–present	Flag of Lopatni	
	2023–present	Flag of Medvedovo	
	2025–present	Flag of Mglin	
	2023–present	Flag of Milkovskoye	
	2023–present	Flag of Novoropskoye	
	2023–present	Flag of Novoyurkovichskoye	
	2018–present	Flag of Ovstugskoye	
	2023–present	Flag of Pervo Maya	
	2023–present	Flag of Plavnoye	
	2025–present	Flag of Pogar	
	2017–present	Flag of Rekovichskoye	
	2023–present	Flag of Rozhnovskoye	
	2023–present	Flag of Sachkovichskoye	
	2021?–present	Flag of Sevsk	
	2023–present	Flag of Smolevichi	
	2023–present	Flag of Smotrova Buda	
	2018–present	Flag of Starodub	
	2017–present	Flag of Litizhskoye	
	2017–present	Flag of Maryinskoye	
	2018–present	Flag of Lopandinskoye	
	2024–present	Flag of Surazh	
	2023–present	Flag of Sytobudskoye	
	2025–present	Flag of Krasnokosarovskoye	
	2025–present	Flag of Simontovskoye	
	2024–present	Flag of Kulazhskoye	
	2024–present	Flag of Lopaznenskoye	
	2024–present	Flag of Nivnyanskoye	
	2024–present	Flag of Ovchinskoye	
	2025–present	Flag of Unecha	
	2018–present	Flag of Usozhskoye	
	2023–present	Flag of Velikotopalskoye	
	2025–present	Flag of Vetlevskoye	
	2024–present	Flag of Vlazovichskoye	
