= Nikolay Alexeyenko =

Russian politician

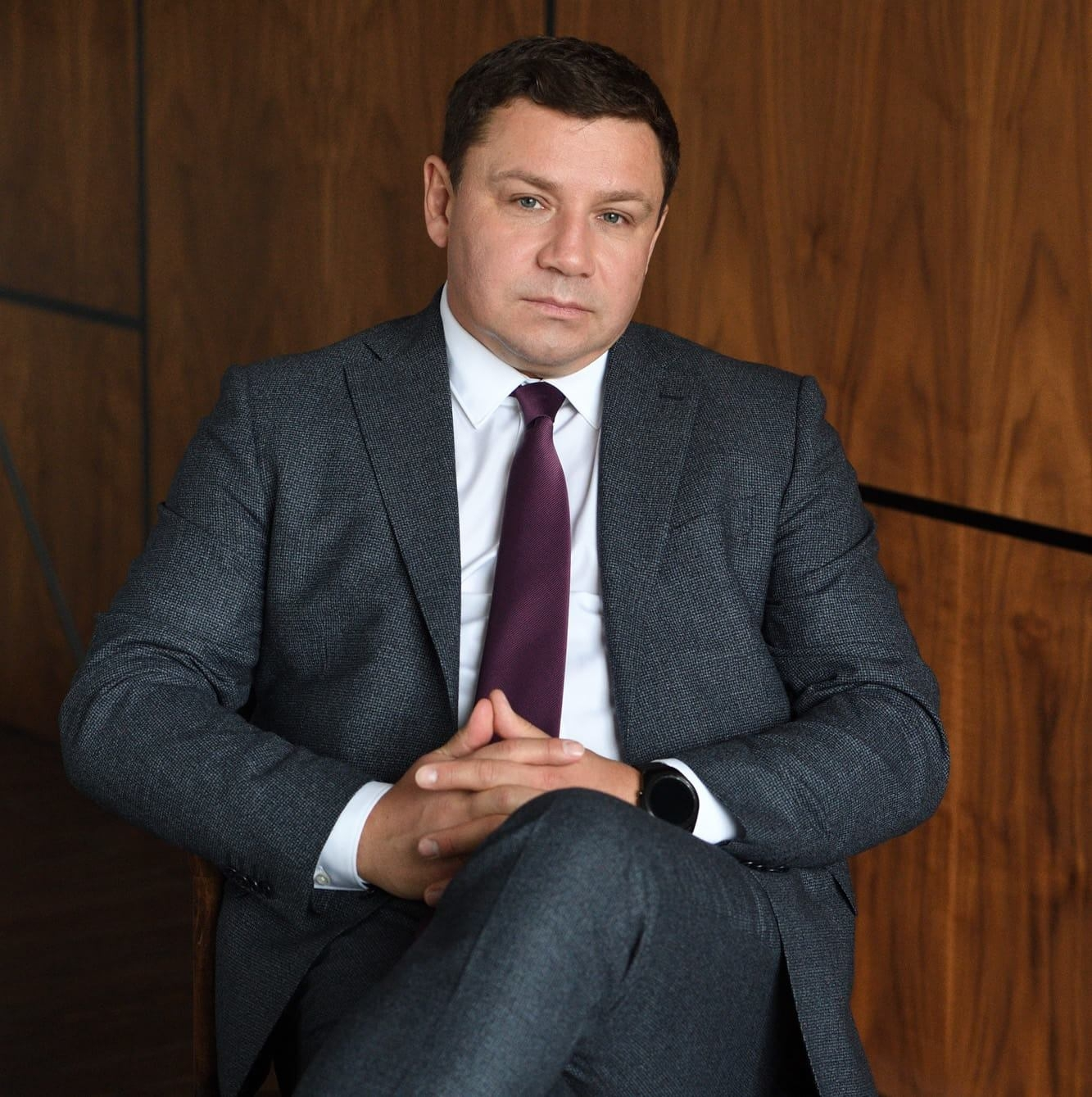

Deputy of the State Duma Russia
- In office 19 September 2021 – 28 May 2024
- Preceded by: Valentina Mironova
- Succeeded by: Oleg Matytsin
- Constituency: Unecha (No. 78)

Personal details
- Born: 29 November 1971 (age 54) Izium, Kharkov Oblast, Ukrainian SSR, USSR
- Party: United Russia
- Education: State University of Land Use Planning
- Occupation: land surveyor/engineer

Nikolay Nikolayevich Alexeyenko (Russian: Николай Николаевич Алексеенко; born 29 November 1971, Izium, Kharkiv Oblast) is a Russian political figure, deputy of the 8th State Duma convocation from 2021 to 2024.

In 2013 he was awarded a Candidate of Legal Sciences degree from the Moscow State Linguistic University. The same year he co-founded and became the head of The Rating Agency of Building Complex (R.A.B.C.) (Russian: Рейтинговое агентство строительного комплекса (РАСК)) aiming to develop and provide independent ratings and rankings in the field of construction industry. He left his post in September 2021 as he was elected to the State Duma of 8th convocation as a deputy of the Bryansk Oblast. He ran as a member of United Russia.

In 2021, Alekseenko won the United Russia primaries and subsequently the election to the State Duma of the 8th convocation from the 78th Unecha single-mandate constituency. He joined the Committee on Construction and Housing and Communal Services, becoming Deputy Chairman of the Committee.

On May 28, 2024, he resigned from his position as a deputy.

Since 2024, he has been a member of the 8th Bryansk Regional Duma, representing the United Russia faction. He serves as Deputy Chairman of the Committee on Industry, Construction, Communications, Entrepreneurship and Property.

He is also Deputy Chairman of the Russian Chamber of Commerce and Industry Committee on Entrepreneurship in the Construction Sector, an expert with “People’s Front. Analytics”, and an adviser to the Director General of the Directorate of the State Customer for the Implementation of Comprehensive Transport Infrastructure Development Projects (Rostransmodernizatsiya).

He has participated in Russia’s military operations in Ukraine.

== Awards and Honours ==
- Two Medals “For Courage” (2023, 2025)
- Medal “For Contribution to Strengthening the Defence of the Russian Federation” (2024)
- Medal “For Combat Distinction” (2024)
- Medal “To a Participant in the Special Military Operation” (2024)
- Certificate of Honour of the President of the Russian Federation (2024)
- Honorary title “Honoured Builder of Russia”
