= Alexandra Kroutikova =

Russian opera singer (1851–1919)

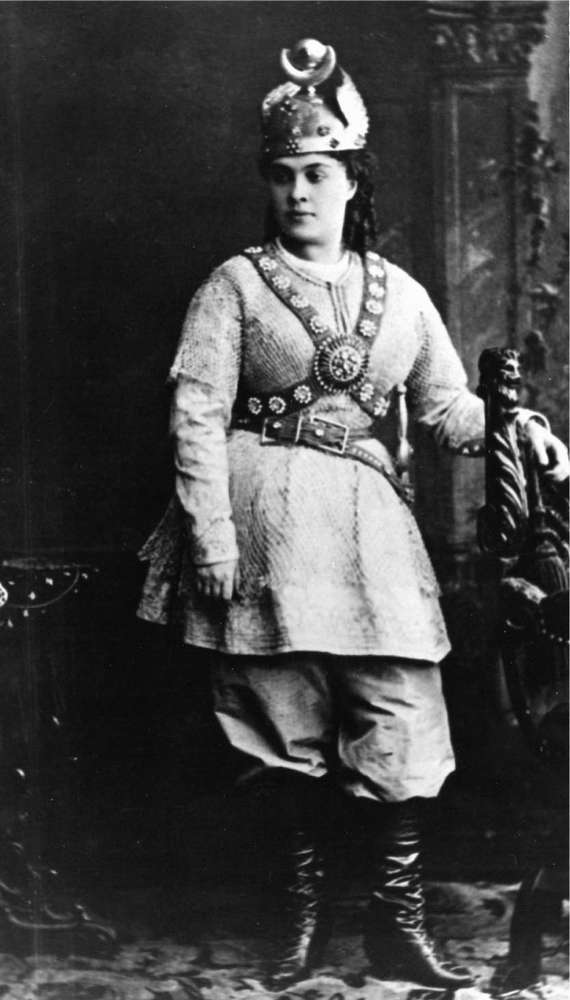
- Alexandra Kroutikova in Ruslan and Lyudmila (as Prince Ratmir), 1880s

Background information
- Born: 1851; Pochep, Chernihiv Governorate
- Died: 1919 (aged 67–68)
- Genre: contralto
- Occupation: Opera singer

Alexandra Pavlovna Krutikova (Russian: Александра Павловна Крутикова; born in 1851 in Pochep, Chernihiv Governorate, Russian Empire – died in 1919), was a Russian opera singer and contralto.

== Life ==
She studied in Paris with François Wartel , then in Saint Petersburg, where she graduated from the conservatory in 1872 in the class of Henriette Nissen-Saloman. she made her stage debut as Vania in Mikhail Glinka's A Life for the Tsar at the Mariinsky Theatre in 1873.

She joined the Bolshoi Theatre company in Moscow in 1880. she toured Sweden, Odessa, Kharkiv, and Kiev to great acclaim. she first sang the role of Eugène Onéguine at the Bolshoi in January 1881. she also sang in another Tchaikovsky opera, this time in the premiere of Mazeppa in 1884. Tchaikovsky held her talent in such high esteem that he dedicated two romances to her: "Reconciliation" (Or. 25, No. 1, 1874) and "You Are Only One" (Or. 57, No. 6, 1884).

Alexandra Krutikova performed in some forty roles, including Princess Morozova in The Oprichnik, Ortrud in Lohengrin , Zerlina in Don Giovanni, the Countess in The The Queen of Spades, Prince Ratmir in Ruslan and Lyudmila, Solokha in The Queen's Shoes, and many others.

She was the wife of the renowned baritone Bogomir Korsov .
