= Korzhovka-Golubovka =

Korzhovka-Golubovka Коржовка-Голубовка
- Selo
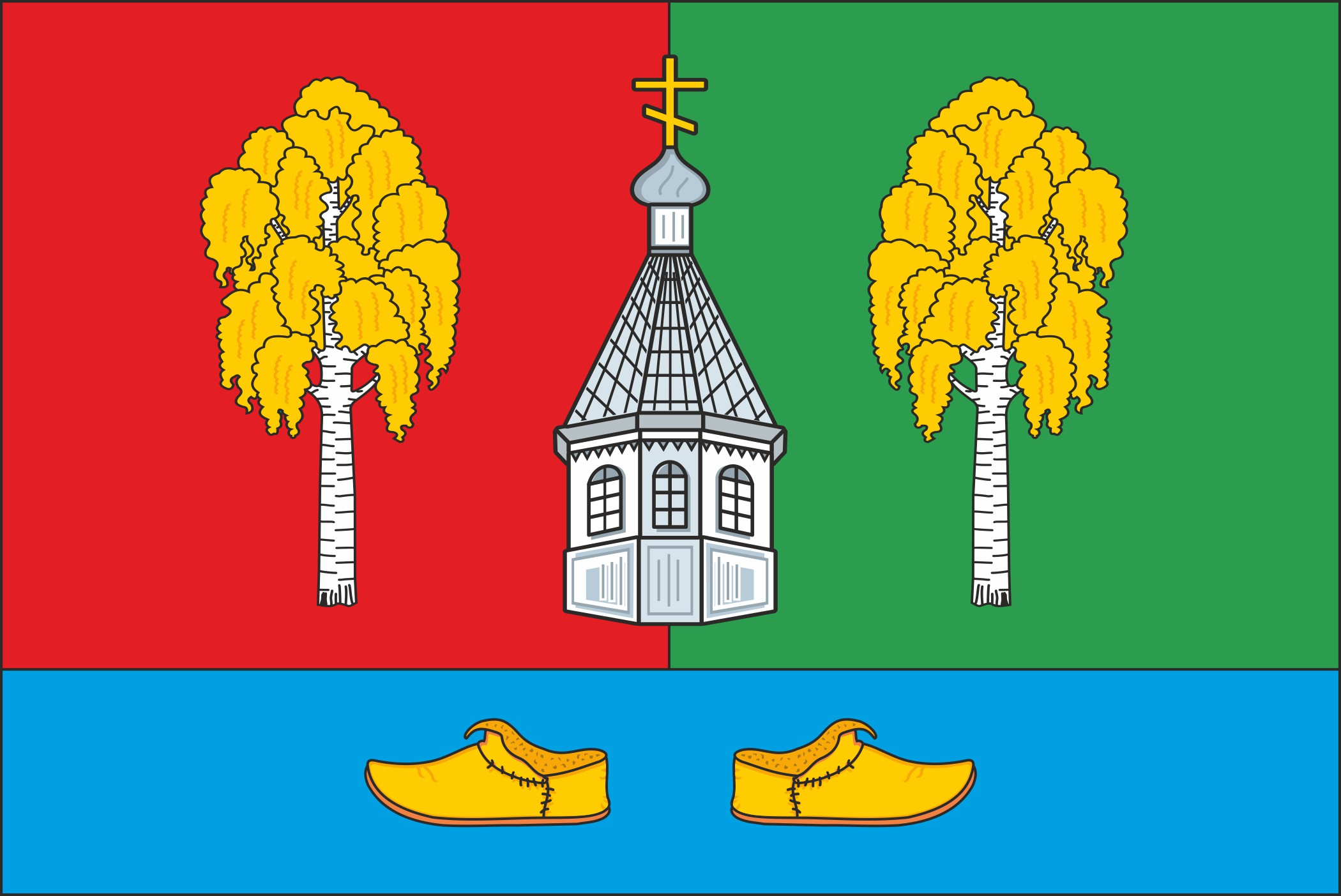
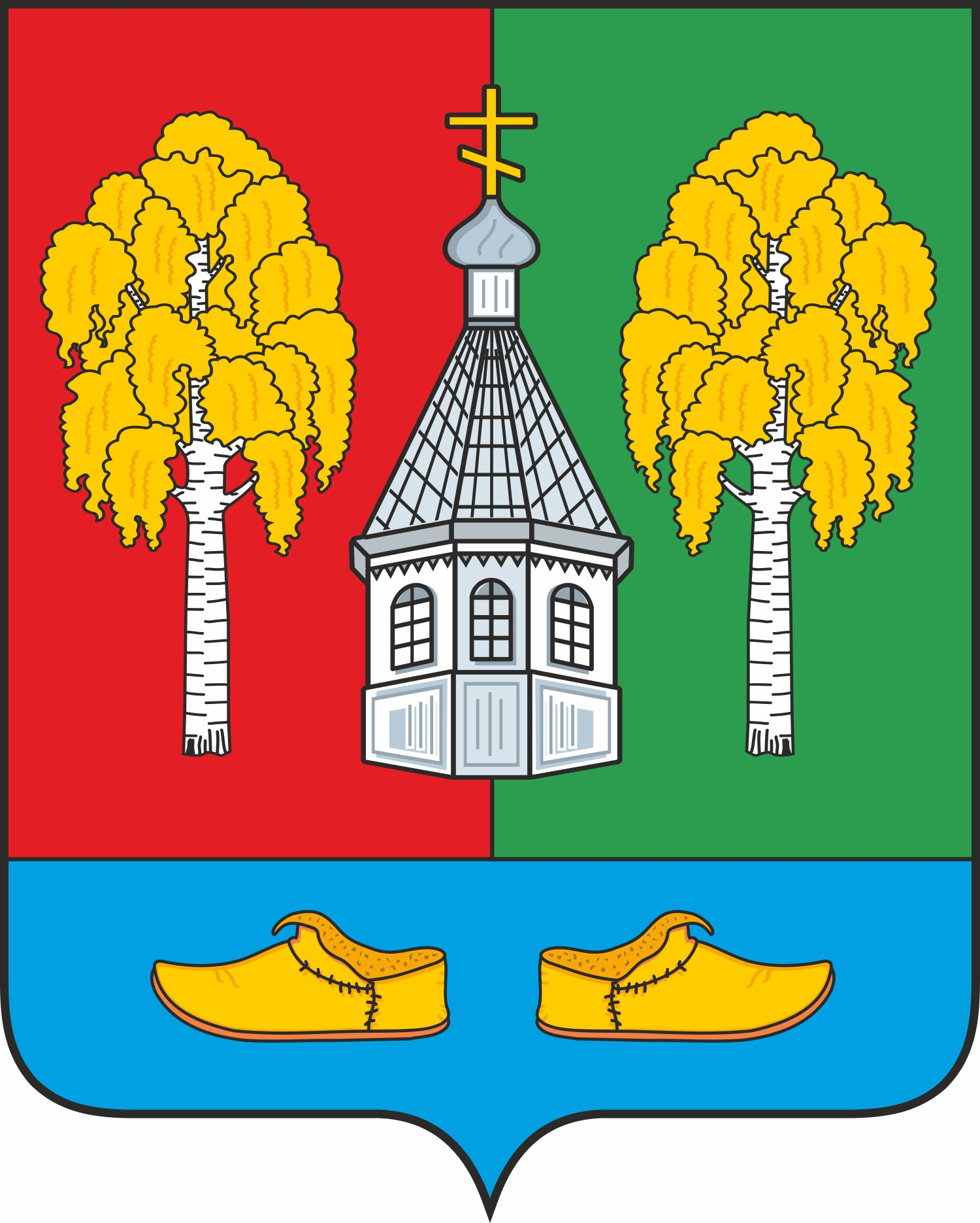
- Flag Coat of arms

- Location within Bryansk Oblast Location within Russia
- Coordinates: 52°45′N 32°20′E
- Country: Russia
- Region: Bryansk Oblast
- District: Klintsovsky District
- Municipality: Korzhovogolubovskoye rural settlement
- Time zone: UTC+3:00

Korzhovka-Golubovka (Russian: Коржовка-Голубовка) is a rural locality (a selo) and the administrative center of Korzhovogolubovskoye Rural Settlement, Klintsovsky District, Bryansk Oblast, Russia. The population was 2,266 as of 2010. There are 33 streets.

== Geography ==
Korzhovka-Golubovka is located 9 km east of Klintsy (the district's administrative centre) by road. Rassvet is the nearest rural locality.
