= Smolevichi, Bryansk Oblast =

Smolevichi Смолевичи
- Selo
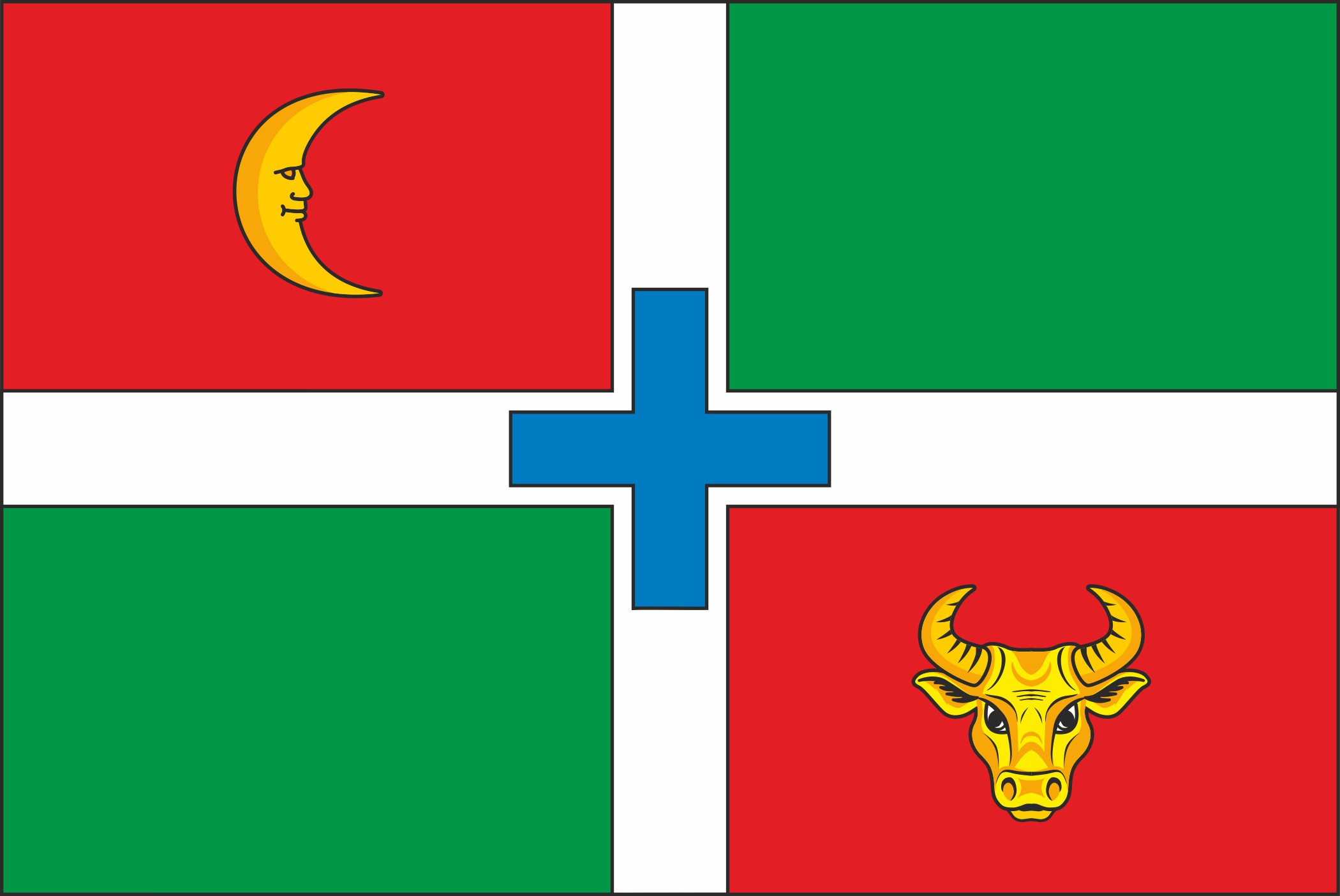
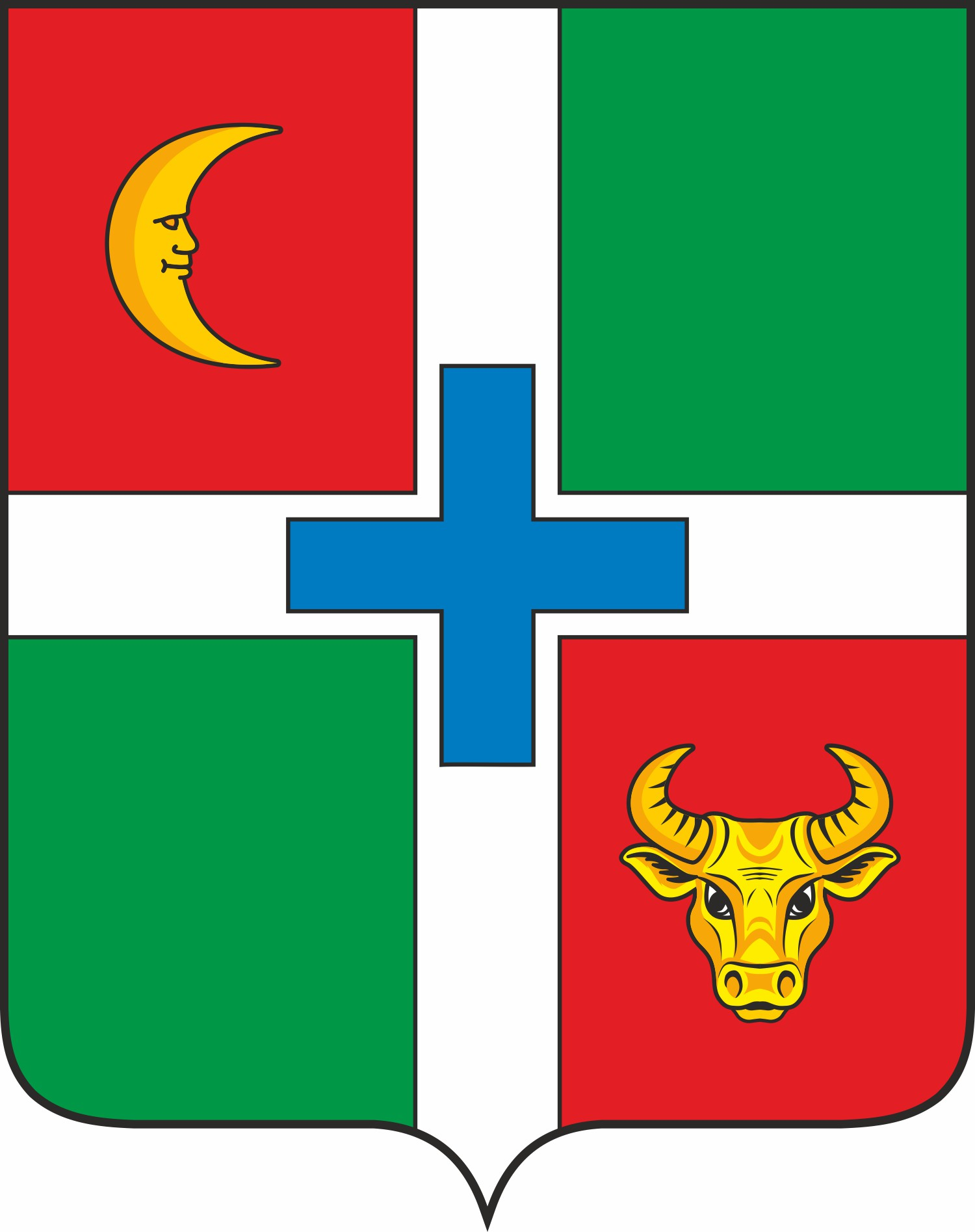
- Flag Coat of arms

- Location within Bryansk Oblast Location within Russia
- Coordinates: 52°49′N 32°12′E
- Country: Russia
- Region: Bryansk Oblast
- District: Klintsovsky District
- Municipality: Smolevichskoye rural settlement
- Time zone: UTC+3:00

Smolevichi (Russian: Смолевичи) is a rural locality (a selo) and the administrative center of Smolevichskoye Rural Settlement, Klintsovsky District, Bryansk Oblast, Russia. The population was 737 as of 2010. There are 14 streets.

== Geography ==
Smolevichi is located 9 km north of Klintsy (the district's administrative centre) by road. Melyakovka is the nearest rural locality.
