= The Bryansk Forest Sternly Stirred =

Soviet 1942 song

- The coat of arms of Bryansk Oblast
- Regional anthem of Bryansk Oblast
- Lyrics: Anatoly Sofronova, 1942
- Music: Sigismund Katz
- Adopted: November 5, 1998

The Bryansk forests rustled harshly… is a Soviet song from the Great Patriotic War. The lyrics were by Anatoly Sofronova, with music by Sigismund Katz.

== Lyrics ==
The Bryansk forest rustled sternly,
Blue fogs descended,
And the pines heard all around,
How they marched against the Germans (Note: The lyrics are given in accordance with the 1942 version; after the war, the beginning of the line was modified to read "how they marched to battle" or "how they marched along the path.") partisans.

A secret path between the birches
They hurried through the dense thickets,
And each carried on his shoulders
A rifle with cast bullets.

And on a terrible night,
They attacked the fascist headquarters,
And the bullets whistled loudly between the tree trunks
In the Bryansk oak groves.

There is no salvation for the enemies in the forests:
Soviet grenades are flying,
And the commander shouts after them:
"Destroy the invaders, guys!"

...The Bryansk forest rustled sternly,
Blue fogs descended,
And the pines heard around,
How the partisans were marching with victory.

1942

== History of creation ==
The song was written during the Great Patriotic War, in the autumn of 1942, deep behind enemy lines. The basis was the 19th century folk song "The Burrowing Storm" about the death of Ermak, the favorite song of the first detachment commander, D. E. Kravtsov.

On the night of November 6–7, 1942, Anatoly Sofronov performed it for the first time among the partisans. The author's recollections:

I sang it once, they asked me to sing it again, then a third time. They hugged me. And suddenly someone remembered that they had their own accordion player, and that they had to find him by morning and bring him here, and that he had a good ear and would definitely remember it... The next morning, a blind accordion player turned up in the same house. I don't remember his first or last name. I sat with him for about an hour, slowly humming the melody of the song to him, and somewhere by the end of that hour he was singing the song with me, and around us in that wooden house in the middle of the burnt village people gathered and also sang the song “The Bryansk forest rustled harshly” together with us…

According to the law of Bryansk Oblast No. 47-Z "On the symbols of the Bryansk Oblast" dated 20.11.98, adopted by the Bryansk Regional Duma November 5, 1998, the song "The Bryansk forest rustled harshly" was declared the anthem of Bryansk Oblast.

== See also ==
- List of regional anthems
- Anthems of the Soviet Republics
