= Oleg Matytsin =

Russian statesman

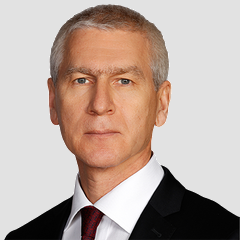

Chairman of the State Duma committee on Physical Culture and Sport
- Incumbent
- Assumed office 17 September 2024
- Preceded by: Dmitry Svishchev

Deputy of State Duma Russia
- Incumbent
- Assumed office 8 September 2024
- Preceded by: Nikolay Alekseyenko
- Constituency: Unecha (No.78)

Minister of Sport Russia
- In office 21 January 2020 – 14 May 2024
- President: Vladimir Putin
- Prime Minister: Mikhail Mishustin
- Preceded by: Pavel Kolobkov
- Succeeded by: Mikhail Degtyarev

President of the International University Sports Federation
- In office 8 November 2015 – 23 March 2021 (Note: Matytsin temporarily relinqushed the charge from 23 March 2021 to 18 November 2023)
- Preceded by: Claude-Louis Gallien
- Succeeded by: Leonz Eder

Personal details
- Born: May 19, 1964 (age 62) Moscow, Russian SFSR, USSR (now Russia)
- Party: United Russia
- Education: State Institute of Physical Culture; Beijing Sport University; RANEPA
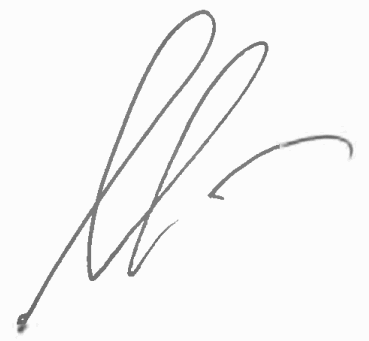
- Signature

Oleg Vasilyevich Matytsin (Russian: Олег Васильевич Матыцин, born 19 May 1964) is a Russian politician, professor. Chairman of the State Duma Russia committee on Physical Culture and Sport from 17 September 2024 year.

Doctor of Pedagogical Sciences, Corresponding Member of Russian Academy of Education and Honoured Doctor of Beijing Sport University.

He served as Minister of Sport of Russia from 2020 to May 2024 and has served as President of the International University Sports Federation (FISU) from 2015 to 2021. He is also a member of the Presidential Council of the Russian Federation for the Development of Physical Culture and Sport, a member of the International Fair Play Committee, and Honorary President of the Russian Students Sport Union (RSSU). Before becoming President of FISU, Matytsin was Vice-President of the University Sports Federation (EUSA) from 2007 to 2015.

== Education ==
Matytsin graduated from the State Central Order of Lenin Institute of Physical Education (now the Russian State University of Physical Education, Sport, Youth and Tourism) in 1985, specialising in physical culture and sport. In 1990, he received a postgraduate degree from the same university. In 1991, Matytsin graduated from the Beijing Sport University. In 2006, he graduated from the Russian Academy of Public Service under the President of the Russian Federation (now the Russian Presidential Academy of National Economy and Public Administration), receiving a diploma in State and Municipal Management.

== Sporting achievements ==
Matytsin started his table tennis career in 1975 in Moscow, Russia and played for the USSR university sports society "Burevestnik". He went on to receive his Master of Sport for table tennis from the USSR in 1980, became a member of the USSR national junior team (1980-1982) and won the USSR Table Tennis Cup in 1983. He was also a medalist at the USSR Spartakiad (1983) and the 1984 USSR Championship.

He later headed the Russian State Academy of Physical Education table tennis team, which won both the 1988 and 1990 USSR Universiades. He was also head coach of the Russian university table tennis team that participated at the 1992 World University Championship in Lyon, France. Matytsin was named Honored Trainer of the Russian Federation in 1997.

== University career ==
Matytsin worked as a lecturer for the Russian State University of Physical Education, Sport, Youth and Tourism (from 1986-to 1996) and later went on to develop his career within the institution. In 1996 he became Dean of the Individual Professional Education Faculty and continued in this role until he was promoted to vice-rector in 1999. He was then rector from 2001 to 2006.

From 2006 until 2015, Matytsin was President of the Russian State University of Physical Education, Sport, Youth and Tourism.

Matytsin's research field was psychology and pedagogy of sport. He has authored more than 80 scientific publications, including two monographs and five manuals.

== RSSU Presidency ==
Matytsin became President of the RSSU in 2005. Under his leadership, a Russian Student Sport Festival was launched in 2009 and biannual Russian Summer and Winter Universiades were successfully renewed. During his time as president, he cooperated with international university sports organisations to secure international sports and educational events for the Russian Federation.

From 2009 to 2013, Matytsin was Deputy Chairman of the Kazan 2013 Universiade Organising Committee. The Russian Student Sport Union played a key part in organising the Summer Universiade, which was a great success. The event broke records in terms of number of participants (almost 12,000), sports (27) and medal events (351).

Following Kazan's success, Matytsin became one of the founders of the FISU International Educational Centre in the Volga Region State Academy of Physical Culture, Sport and Tourism. The centre aims to promote the ideas and values of international student sport by using innovative educational platforms, providing high quality training in the field of university sport, conducting research activities and creating sustainable Universiade legacies.

Matytsin also played a key role in Krasnoyarsk's nomination as a candidate for the winter Universiade in 2019, with the city eventually chosen by FISU 9 November 2013. Matytsin has been the Deputy Chairman of the Krasnoyarsk 2019 Organising Committee.

Since 2014, Matytsin's work as leader of his national university sports federation (NUSF) received recognition from both the IOC and FISU. In 2010, RSSU was awarded the IOC trophy for "Sport - Inspiring Young People" and in 2015 RSSU was named the "Best NUSF" by FISU.

After becoming President of FISU, Matytsin relinquished his term at the RSSU and was succeeded by Sergey Seyranov. Matytsin remains Honorary President of the RSSU.

== FISU Presidency ==
Matytsin became President of FISU in November 2015

Prior to becoming president, Matytsin served four years as First Vice-President of FISU. Under Matytsin's leadership, FISU is set to develop a strategic plan to guide its operations over the next 10 years. This will define FISU's strategic goals and act as a detailed roadmap for achieving them. The strategy is dictated by FISU's vision, which is "to create a world where university sport has positively shaped the majority of leaders in society".

Following the CAS decision in the case of WADA vs RUSADA, Matytsin vacated the FISU Presidency on 23 March 2021 until 17 December 2022. Leonz Eder serves as the Acting President.

== Political career ==
On 21 January 2020, Matytsin was appointed Minister of Sport of Russia in the Mikhail Mishustin's Cabinet. In May 2024 Matytsin was rumoured to leave the Government of Russia. Matytsin eventually was not re-appointed to the Mikhail Mishustin's Second Cabinet and was replaced as Minister by Governor of Khabarovsk Krai Mikhail Degtyarev.

After leaving the Government Matytsin took a full time job as professor of sport law in the Kutafin Moscow State Law University as well as was appointed Advisor to Prime Minister Mikhail Mishustin. Matytsin was also rumoured to be a United Russia candidate in the upcoming Unecha constituency by-election to the State Duma. Matytsin was later announced as United Russia candidate in the Unecha constituency by-election. Matytsin won the by-election with 68.01% of the vote.

In anticipation of Matytsin's election Dmitry Svishchev resigned from his position as Chairman of the State Duma Committee on Physical Culture and Sport in late July 2024. On September 16, 2024, Matytsin, along with fellow freshmen and former Mikhail Mishustin's Cabinet member Viktoria Abramchenko and Nikolay Shulginov, was unanimously admitted to the United Russia faction in the State Duma. On September 17, 2024, Matytsin was unanimously elected Chairman of the Duma Committee on Physical Culture and Sport.

== Honorary titles ==
- 1997 – Honoured Trainer of the Russian Federation
- 1980 - Master of Sports of the USSR in table tennis
- 2002 - Corresponding Member of the Imperial Saint Petersburg Academy of Sciences.
- 2005 – Honorary Doctor of the National Sports Academy of Bulgaria NSA"Vasill Levski"
- 2005 – Honorary Doctor of Beijing Sport University
- 2015 – Doctor Honoris Causa Lithuanian Sports of Lithuanian Sports University

=== Awards ===
- The Order of Friendship
- Medal "In Commemoration of the 1000th anniversary of Kazan"
- Medal "In Commemoration of the 850th anniversary of Moscow"
- Breastplate "Honoured Worker of Higher Professional Education of the Russian Federation"
- Medal from the Russian Olympic Committee "For Merit in the Development of Olympic Movement in Russia"
- Medal from the Ministry of Sport of the Russian Federation “For Merit in the Development of Physical Culture and Sport”
- Breastplate from the Ministry of Internal Affairs of the Russian Federation "For merit in service"
- Petr Lesgaft Medal

== Electoral history ==
=== 2024 ===
Summary of the 6–8 September 2024 by-election in the Unecha constituency
Candidate	Party	Votes	%
Oleg Matytsin	United Russia	180,650	68.01%
Andrey Arkhitsky	Communist Party	32,432	12.21%
Ruslan Titov	Liberal Democratic Party	20,626	7.76%
Aleksey Timoshkov	A Just Russia – For Truth	13,721	5.17%
Sergey Gorelov	New People	13,541	5.10%
Total		204,566	100%
