= Dyatkovsky =

Dyatkovsky (masculine), Dyatkovskaya (feminine), or Dyatkovskoye (neuter) may refer to:

- Dyatkovsky District, a district of Bryansk Oblast, Russia
- Dyatkovsky Urban Administrative Okrug, an administrative division which the town of Dyatkovo and five rural localities in Dyatkovsky District of Bryansk Oblast, Russia are incorporated as
- Dyatkovskoye Urban Settlement, a municipal formation which Dyatkovsky Urban Administrative Okrug in Dyatkovsky District of Bryansk Oblast, Russia is incorporated as
