= Coat of arms of Bryansk Oblast =

Emblem of Bryansk Oblast, Russia

Versions
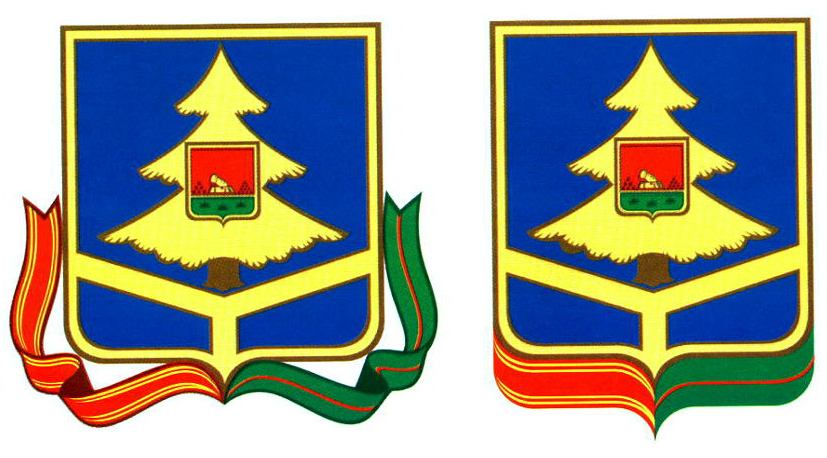
- Non-parade versions
- Armiger: Bryansk Oblast
- Adopted: 2004 (blazon); 1998 (law)
- Crest: Hammer and sickle in saltire both Argent handled Or
- Shield: Azure, on a three-tiered spruce Or an inescutcheon of Bryansk and in base a pall also Or
- Order(s): Order of Lenin; Partisan of the Patriotic War Medal
- Other elements: Around the shield, two oak wreaths entwined by order ribbons

The coat of arms of Bryansk Oblast (Russian: Герб Брянской области, Gerb Brjanskoj oblasti) was approved by the Bryansk Oblast Duma on November 5, 1998. According to the official description provided by the legislature of the oblast, the arms of the Bryansk Oblast "reflect the characteristic features of the area and its inhabitants: industry and patriotism.

The escutcheon of Bryansk Oblast is an azure French shield, which represents Pan-Slavism. In the upper part of the shield is a three-tiered spruce, which stands for the forests of Bryansk. The tree itself is defaced by an inescutcheon with the arms of Bryansk, the oblast's capital. At the bottom of the escutcheon is a golden pall, whose three beams symbolise the unity of three East Slavic countries: Russia, Belarus, and Ukraine. Geographically, the Bryansk Oblast is located where all three states neighbour each other.

Around the escutcheon is an oak wreath, an ornament used by all governorates in the Russian Empire and most oblasts in the modern Russian Federation. It thus symbolizes Bryansk Oblast's status as a Russian federal subject. The wreath is entwined with ribbons belonging to two state decorations awarded to the oblast, dating from the Soviet era: the Order of Lenin and the Partisan of the Patriotic War Medal. Likewise, the arms' crest is the Soviet hammer and sickle: outside of its usual proletarian symbolism, it represents the fact that the oblast in its current state was formed in the USSR.

The laws of the Bryansk Oblast allow three versions of the regional arms to be used. The greater coat of arms (or the "parade arms", as per the terminology used in the oblast's laws) includes every element of the blazon, while the lesser coat of arms omits the crest and the oak wreath (while retaining the ribbons, which are placed below the escutcheon).

The coat of arms of Bryansk Oblast did not pass the examination of the Heraldic Council of the President of the Russian Federation. Among the many reasons, it is said that the emblem "fancifully combines elements of imperial and socialist symbols", and the fact that the hammer and sickle, even if they are allowed to be used, are not in place (should not be in the crown), and that the use of the wreath frame contradicts the status of the Bryansk region as a full-fledged subject of the Russian Federation, and the fact that the coat of arms of Bryansk is illegally placed ("usurped") into the coat of arms of the region. Also, the coat of arms is criticized by the heraldists of the Bryansk region.

== See also ==
- Flag of Bryansk Oblast
