= Ministry of Sport (Russia) =

Government minister of Russia

Ministry of Sports of the Russian Federation
- Министерство спорта Российской Федерации; Ministerstvo sporta Rossiiskoi Federatsii
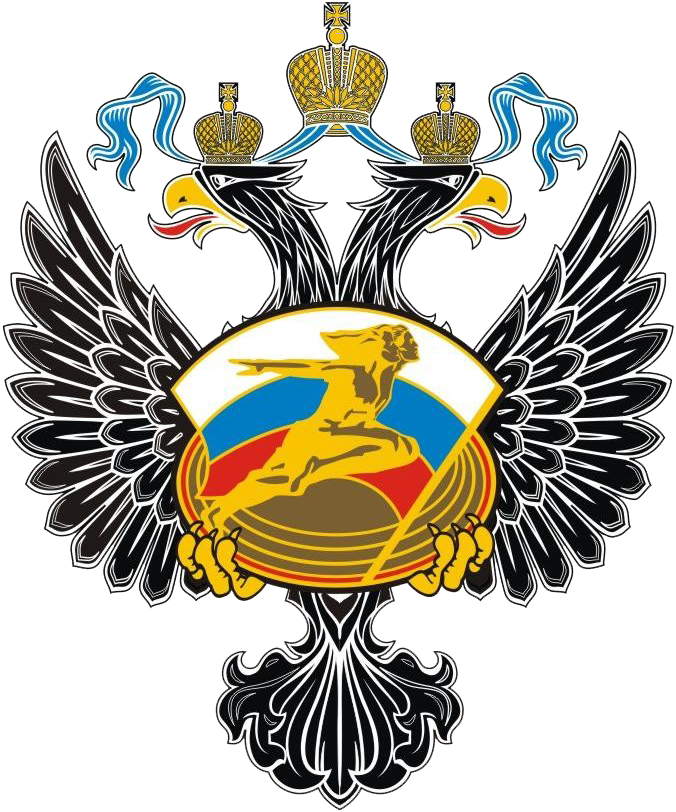

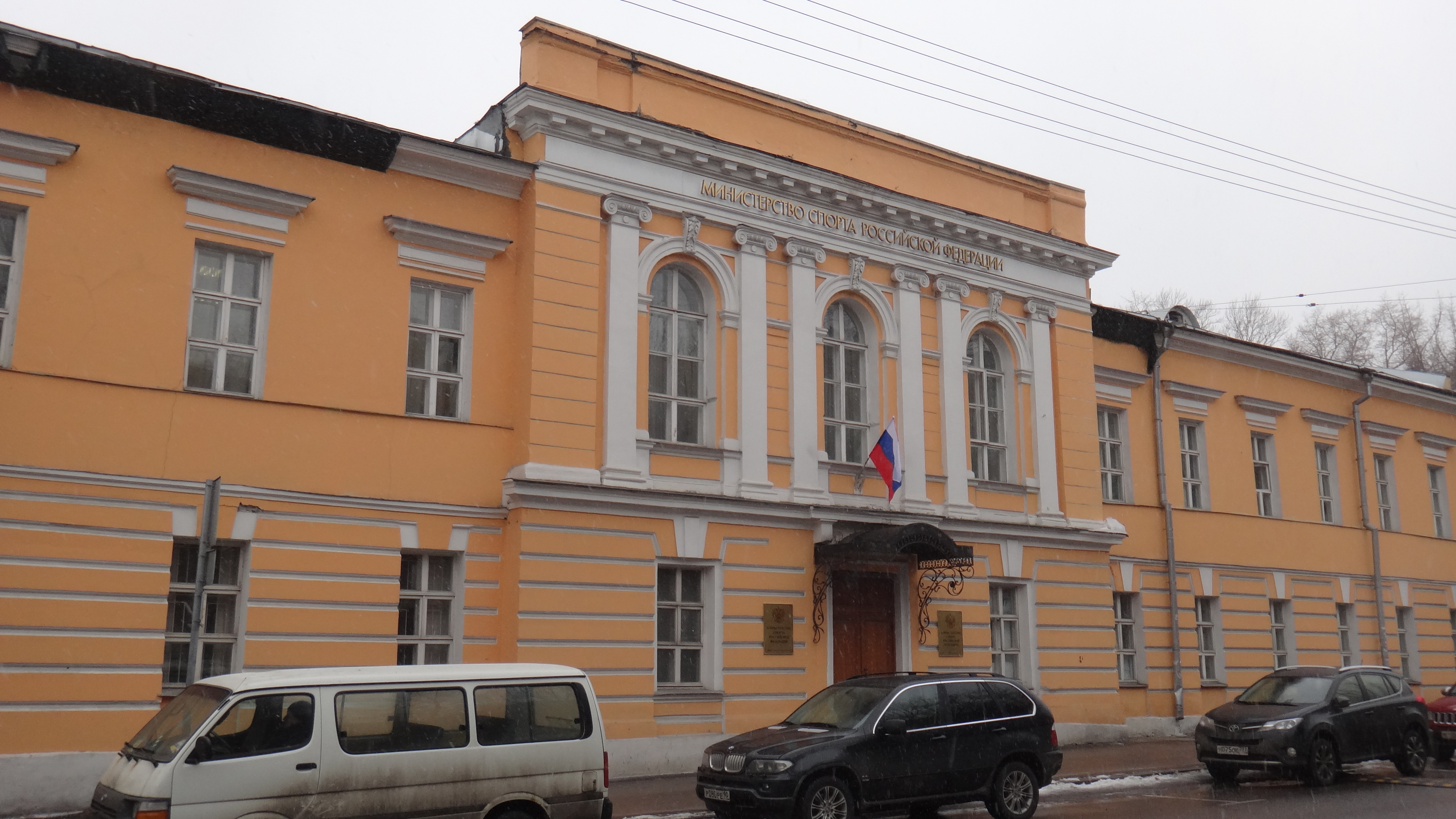
- Ministry's seat in Moscow

Agency overview
- Formed: May 2008
- Preceding agency: Federal Agency of Sports (RFSA)
- Jurisdiction: Government of Russia
- Headquarters: Kazakov Street 18, Moscow; 55.762757°N 37.668504°E
- Annual budget: 75.8 billion roubles (2011 FY)
- Minister responsible: Mikhail Degtyarev, Minister of Sports
- Website: minsport.gov.ru

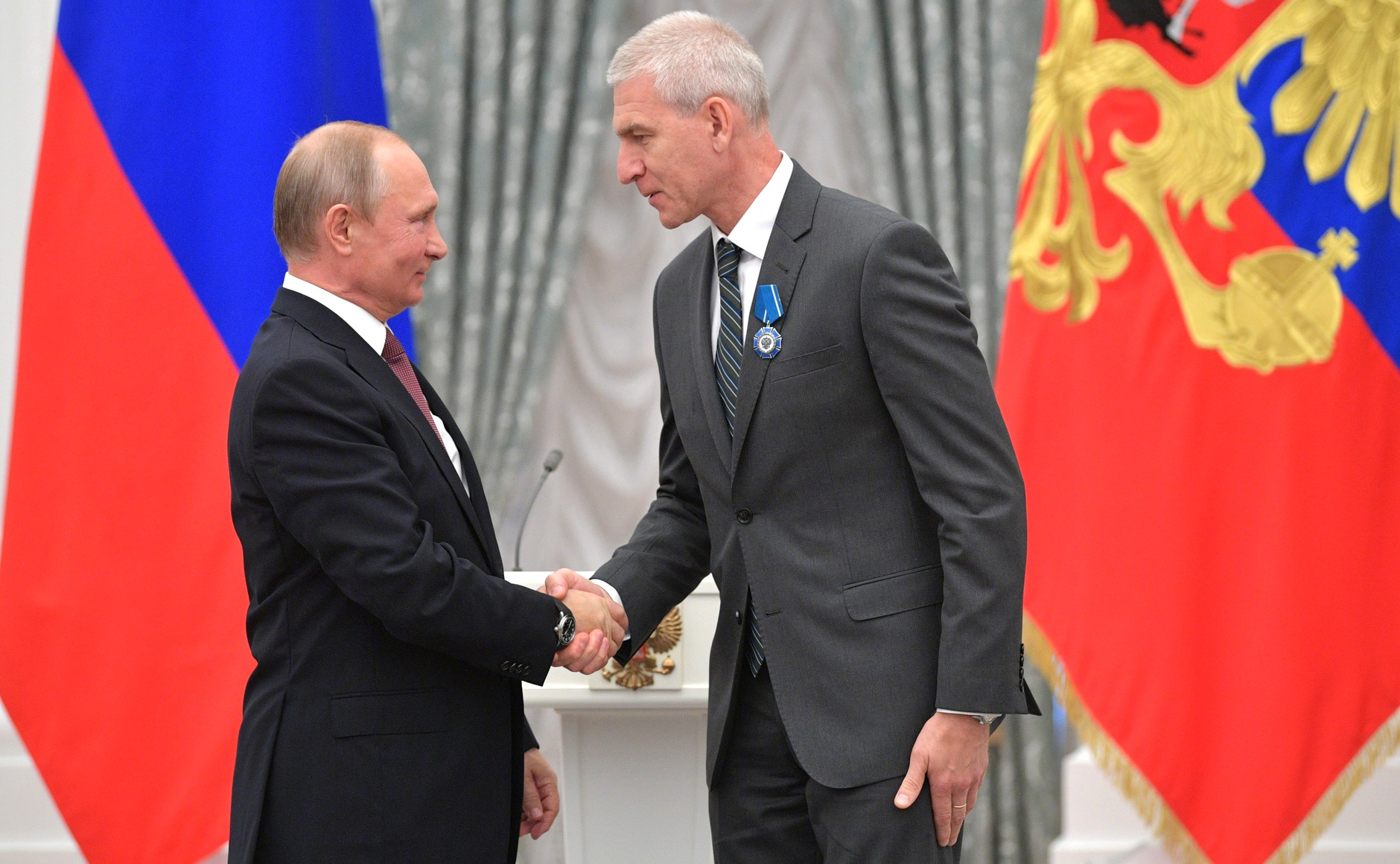
Vladimir Putin and former Minister of Sports Oleg Matytsin

The Ministry of Sports of the Russian Federation (Russian: Министерство спорта Российской Федерации, romanized: Ministerstvo sporta Rossiiskoi Federatsii), often abbreviated as Minsport (Минспорт), is a ministry of the Government of Russia responsible for sports.

The Ministry of Sports oversees the implementation of government policy and regulation of sport, providing state services and federal funding for athletes, and also managing public property in the area of sport and physical fitness in Russia. The ministry was created by the Medvedev Government in 2008 as the Ministry of Sports, Tourism and Youth Policy and has existed in its current form since May 21, 2012. It is headquartered at Kazakov Street 18 in Basmanny District, Moscow.

Mikhail Degtyarev has served as the Minister of Sports since 14 May 2024.

== Structure ==
The Ministry is composed of two branches:

- Department of Sports Development (Russian: Департамент государственной политики развития спорта высших достижений, romanized: Departament gosudarstvennoy politiki razvitiya sporta vysshikh dostizheniy)
- Department of State Policy in Sport (Russian: Департамент государственной политики в сфере физической культуры и спорта, romanized: Departament gosudarstvennoy politiki v sfere fizicheskoy kultury i sporta)

== History ==
=== Soviet period ===
The State Committee for Sports and Physical Education of the USSR (Russian: Комитет по физической культуре и спорту при Совете Министров СССР, romanized: Komitet po fizicheskoy kulture i sportu pri Sovete Ministrov SSSR), abbreviated as Sportkomitet SSSR (Russian: Спорткомитет СССР), was established in 1954 as the only governmental body responsible for the management of sports in the Soviet Union. The committee was a result of the merging of all the sports unions and national teams into one organization.

=== Post-Soviet ===
The State Committee for Sports and Physical Education of Russia (Russian: Государственный комитет Российской Федерации по физической культуре и спорту, romanized: Gosudarstvenny komitet Rossiyskoy Federatsii po fizicheskoy kulture i sportu), abbreviated as Goskomitet po FkiT (Russian: Госкомитет по ФКиТ) or Goskomsport Rossii (Russian: Госкомспорт России) was created in 1991. It was the central governing body for Russian sports. The head of the committee was referred to as the Sports Minister. The committee was a federal executive organization that was responsible for the coordination and development of sports in Russia.

=== Since 2002 ===
The Federal Agency for Sports and Body Culture (Russian: Федеральное агентство по физической культуре и спорту, romanized: Federalnoye agentstvo po fizicheskoy kulture i sportu) was created in 2002 as the successor to the previous sports committee. It was dissolved on October 7, 2008, to be re-established with its current name.

== Involvement in Russian doping scandal ==
An independent investigation led by law professor Richard McLaren found corroborating evidence that Russian Ministry of Sport and the FSB had operated a "state-directed failsafe system" using a "disappearing positive [test] methodology" (DPM) from "at least late 2011 to August 2015".

== Officials ==
=== Ministers of Sport ===
- Boris Ivanyuzhenkov (2008)
- Vitaly Mutko (2008–2016)
- Pavel Kolobkov (2016–2020)
- Oleg Matytsin (2020-2024)
- Mikhail Degtyarev (since 2024)

=== Heads of Sports Committee ===
- Shamil Tarpishchev (1994–1996)
- Leonid Tyagachev (1996–1999)
- Pavel Rozhkov (1999–2001)

=== Head of Hockey Department ===
- Yuri Korolev (1974–1983)

=== Heads of Federal Sports Agency ===
- Vyacheslav Fetisov (2002–2008)

== See also ==
- Sport in Russia
- Russian Olympic Committee
- Russian Paralympic Committee
- Doping in Russia
