= Pochep =

Pochep (Russian: Почеп) is the name of several inhabited localities in Russia.

Urban localities

- Pochep, Bryansk Oblast, a town in Pochepsky District of Bryansk Oblast; 52°56′N 33°27′E

Rural localities

- Pochep, Okulovsky District, Novgorod Oblast, a village in Turbinnoye Settlement of Okulovsky District in Novgorod Oblast
- Pochep, Valdaysky District, Novgorod Oblast, a village in Yazhelbitskoye Settlement of Valdaysky District in Novgorod Oblast
- Pochep, Kalininsky District, Tver Oblast, a village in Slavnovskoye Rural Settlement of Kalininsky District in Tver Oblast
- Pochep, Belyanitskoye Rural Settlement, Sonkovsky District, Tver Oblast, a village in Belyanitskoye Rural Settlement of Sonkovsky District in Tver Oblast
- Pochep, Koyskoye Rural Settlement, Sonkovsky District, Tver Oblast, a village in Koyskoye Rural Settlement of Sonkovsky District in Tver Oblast
- Pochep, Toropetsky District, Tver Oblast, a village in Pozhinskoye Rural Settlement of Toropetsky District in Tver Oblast
- Pochep, Vyshnevolotsky District, Tver Oblast, a village in Sadovoye Rural Settlement of Vyshnevolotsky District in Tver Oblast
