= Seltso =

Town in Bryansk Oblast, Russia

Seltso Сельцо
- Town
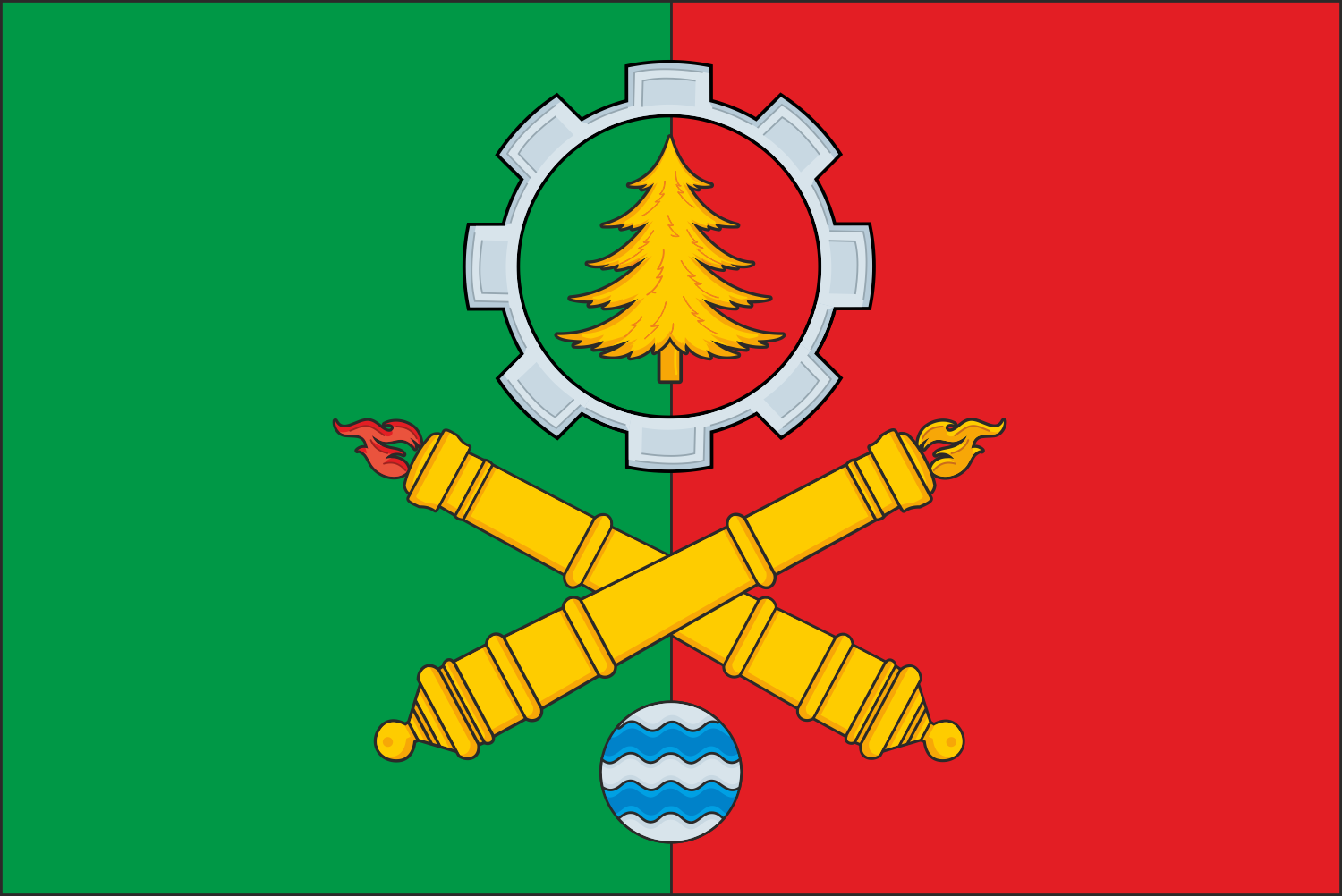
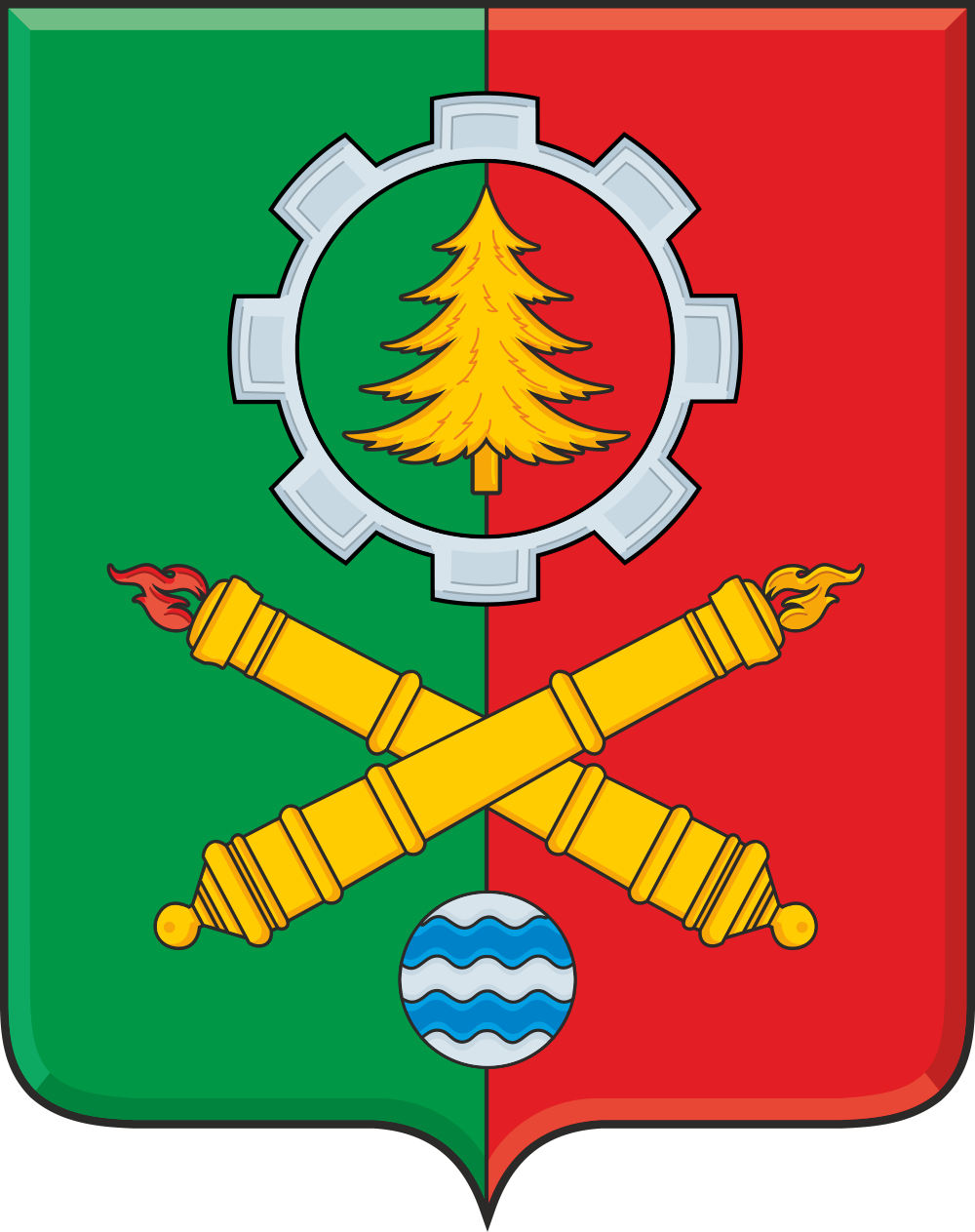
- Flag Coat of arms
- Interactive map of Seltso
- Location of Seltso Seltso (Bryansk Oblast)
- Coordinates: 53°22′04″N 34°05′52″E
- Country: Russia
- Federal subject: Bryansk Oblast
- Founded: 1870
- Town status since: 1990

Area
  - Total: 33.08 km^{2} (12.77 sq mi)
- Elevation: 160 m (520 ft)

Population (2010 Census)
  - Total: 17,934
  - Estimate (2021): 15,906 (−11.3%)
  - Density: 542.1/km^{2} (1,404/sq mi)

Administrative status
  - Subordinated to: Seltsovsky Urban Administrative Okrug (town of oblast significance)
  - Capital of: Seltsovsky Urban Administrative Okrug

Municipal status
  - Urban okrug: Seltso Urban Okrug
  - Capital of: Seltso Urban Okrug
- Time zone: UTC+3 (MSK)
- Postal code: 241550
- Dialing code: +7 4832
- OKTMO ID: 15725000001

Seltso (Russian: Сельцо́, lit. little village) is a town in Bryansk Oblast, Russia, located on the Desna River 22 kilometers (14 mi) northwest of Bryansk. Population: 15,908 (2021 census); 17,934 (2010 census); 19,140 (2002 census); 20,762 (1989 Soviet census). 17,600 (1970).

== History ==
Seltso was granted urban-type settlement status in 1938 and that of a town in 1990.

== Administrative and municipal status ==
Within the framework of administrative divisions, it is incorporated as Seltsovsky Urban Administrative Okrug—an administrative unit with the status equal to that of the districts. As a municipal division, Seltsovsky Urban Administrative Okrug is incorporated as Seltso Urban Okrug.

== History ==
Founded in 1876 in connection with the construction of Rigo-Oryol railway (built-station Selco Gorodtsov). The first industrial plants in steel mills Seltso Kuchkina, Dreyscheva, Kitaeva. From 1886 to 1914 he worked in the Selto small metallurgical plant Guboninsky consisting of the foundry and the forge. At the beginning of the 20th century in the hamlet operated two windmills and a steam mill, 10 sawmills, soap factories. In 1905, the gendarmerie post was established for the prevention of disorder or crime in Seltso.
