= Klintsy =

Town in Bryansk Oblast, Russia

Klintsy Клинцы
- Town
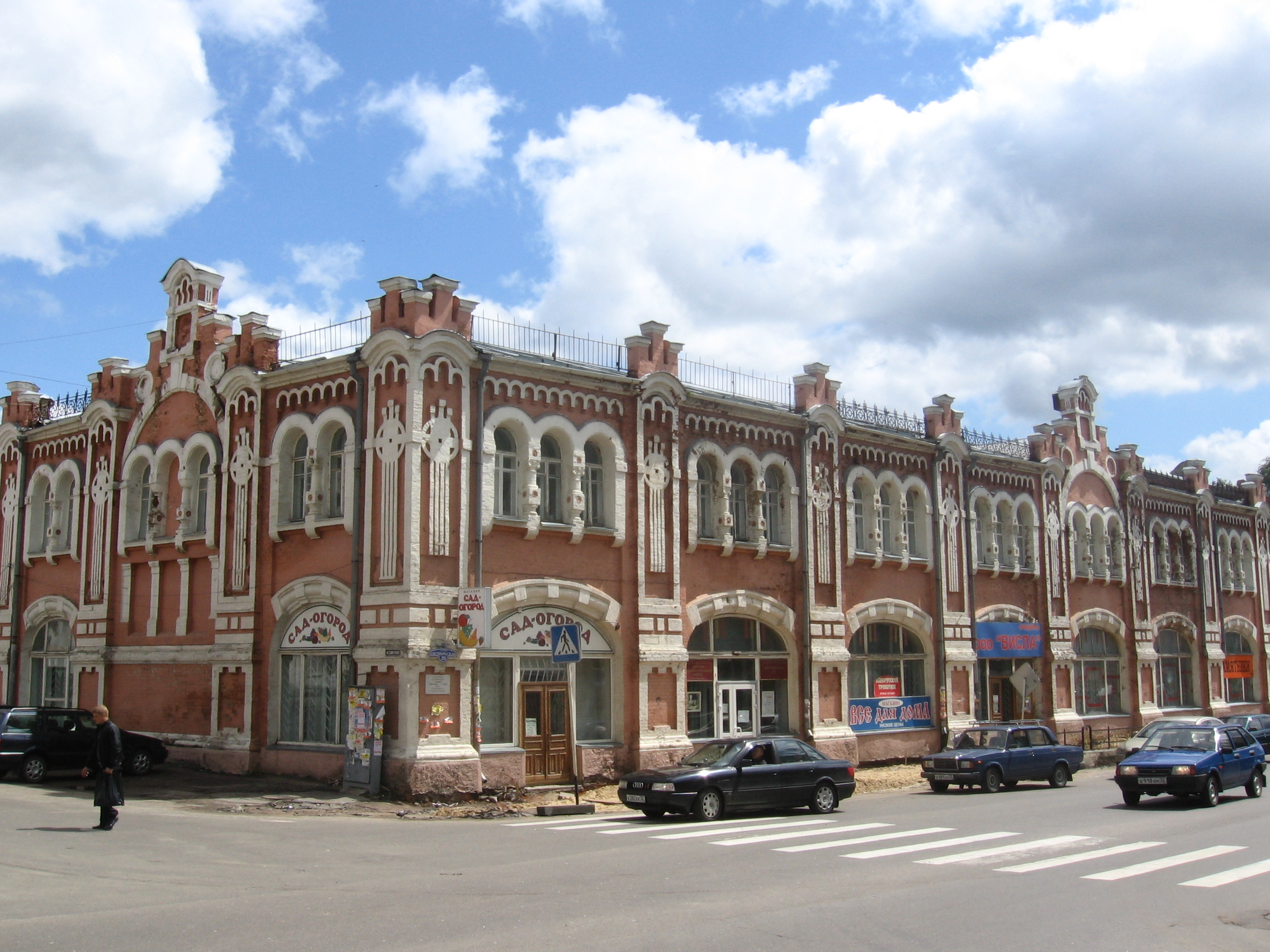
- New Trade Rows of Klintsy

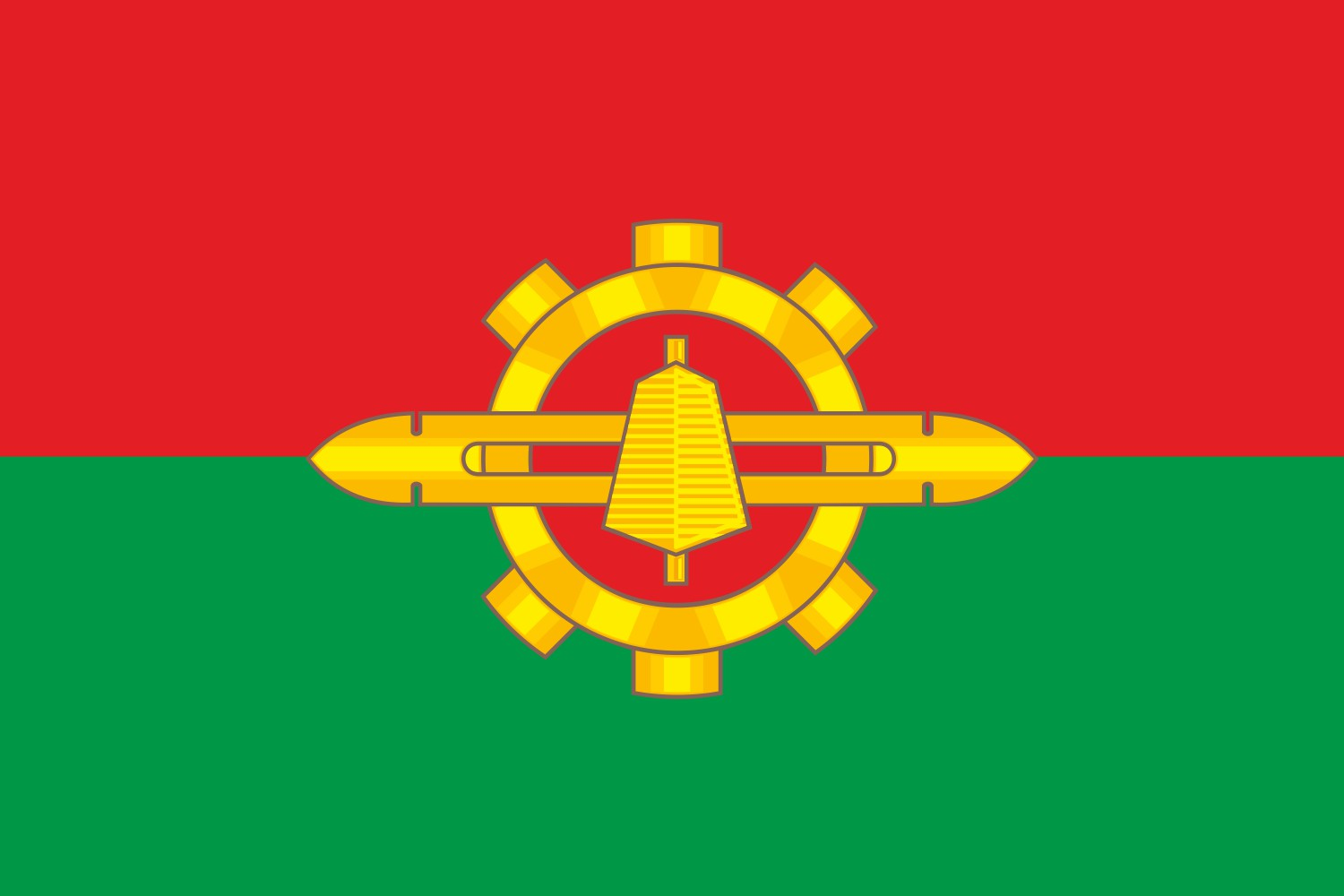
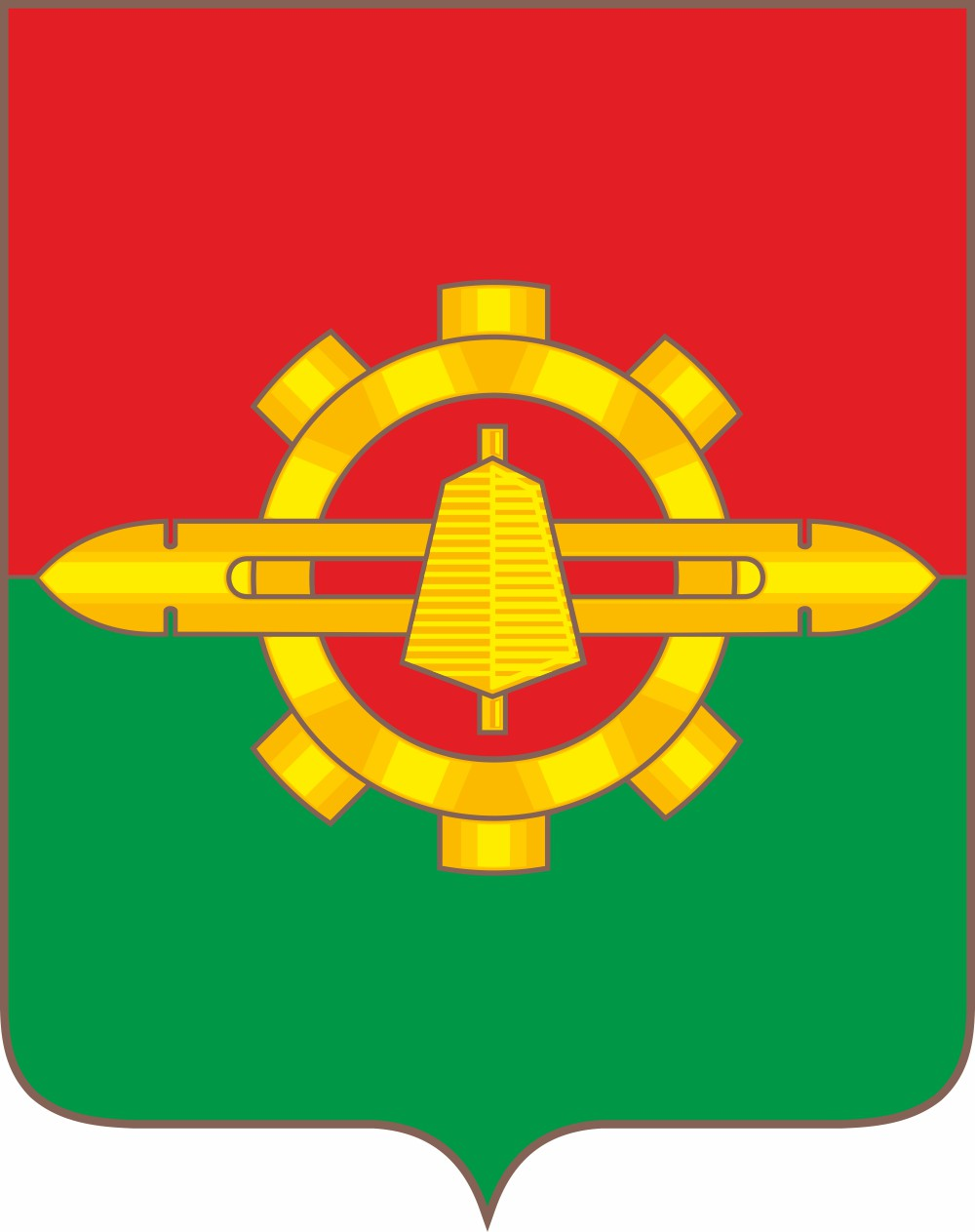
- Flag Coat of arms
- Interactive map of Klintsy
- Location of Klintsy Klintsy (Bryansk Oblast)
- Coordinates: 52°45′N 32°14′E
- Country: Russia
- Federal subject: Bryansk Oblast
- Founded: 1707

Area
  - Total: 63.2 km^{2} (24.4 sq mi)
- Elevation: 160 m (520 ft)

Population (2010 Census)
  - Total: 62,510
  - Estimate (2025): 61,153 (−2.2%)
  - Rank: 256th in 2010
  - Density: 989/km^{2} (2,560/sq mi)

Administrative status
  - Subordinated to: Klintsovsky Urban Administrative Okrug (town of oblast significance)
  - Capital of: Klintsovsky Urban Administrative Okrug, Klintsovsky District

Municipal status
  - Urban okrug: Klintsy Urban Okrug
  - Capital of: Klintsy Urban Okrug, Klintsovsky Municipal District
- Time zone: UTC+3 (MSK)
- Postal code: 243140–243146
- OKTMO ID: 15715000001

Klintsy (Russian: Клинцы́) is a town in Bryansk Oblast, Russia, located on the Turosna River, 164 kilometers (102 miles) southwest of Bryansk. Population: 63,059 (2021 census); 62,510 (2010 census); 67,325 (2002 census); 71,161 (1989 Soviet census); 60,000 (1972).

== Administrative and municipal status ==
Within the framework of administrative divisions, Klintsy serves as the administrative center of Klintsovsky District, even though it is not a part of it. As an administrative division, it is, together with two rural localities, incorporated separately as Klintsovsky Urban Administrative Okrug—an administrative unit with the status equal to that of the districts. As a municipal division, Klintsovsky Urban Administrative Okrug is incorporated as Klintsy Urban Okrug.

== History ==
Klintsy Sloboda was founded in 1707 by peasants-Old Believers, and is named after the last names of the first settlers (Klinets) in the plural. It was initially part of the Starodub Regiment in the Cossack Hetmanate.

In 1782 Klintsy was founded in a part of Surazh district. There were companies printing predominantly Old Believers liturgical books. The development of the printing industry contributed to higher literacy of the town's population.

In 1782–1796 was Klintsy part of the Novgorod-Seversky governorship, and in 1796–1802 part of the Little Russia province. On February 27, 1802 posad Klintsy became part of Chernigov province, Surazh district.

Since the 1830s textile industries were developed which gradually became the most important industry of the city. By the end of the 19th century there was concentrated more than 90% of the textile industry of Chernigov. The city became known as the "Manchester of Chernigov province".

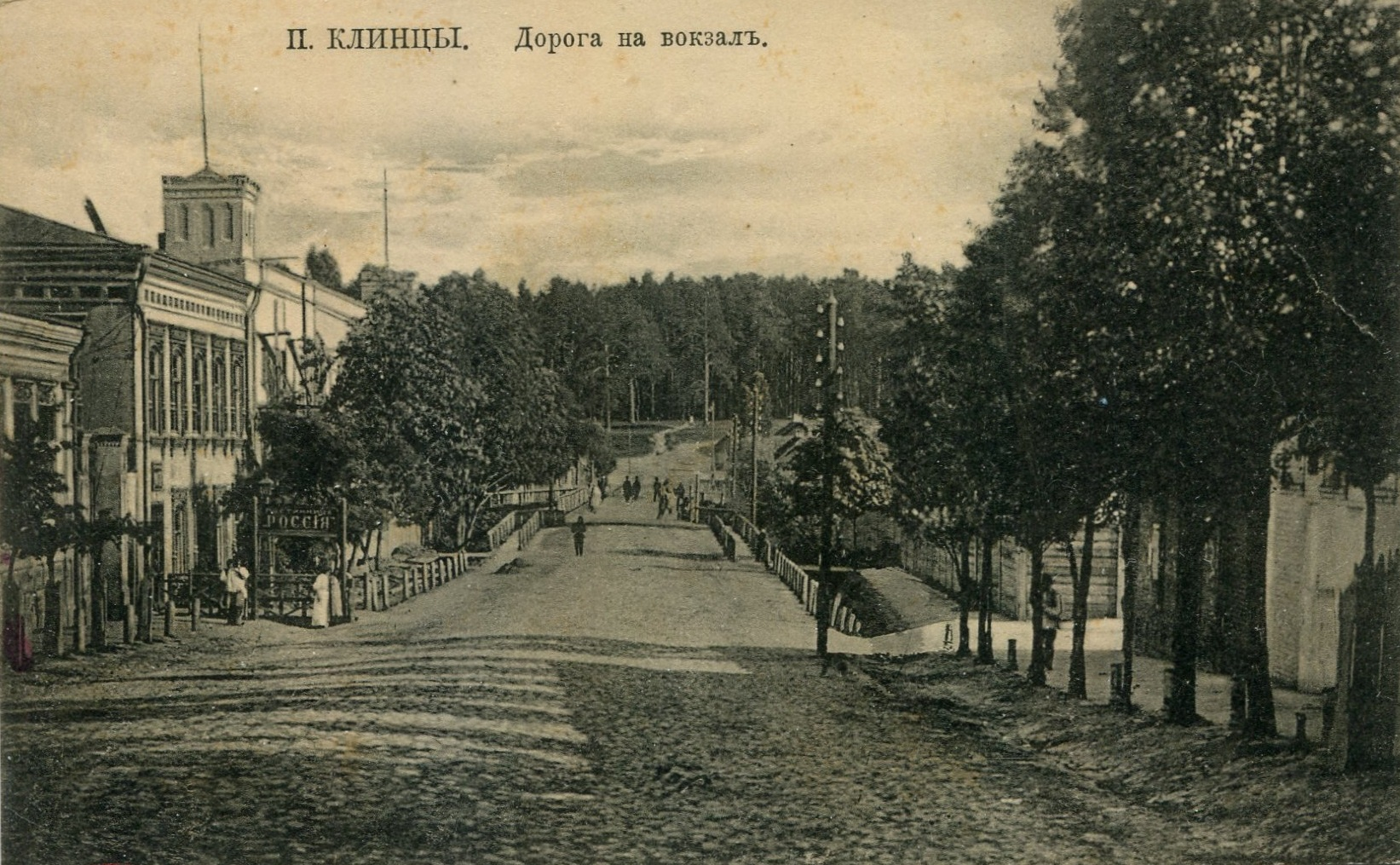
Early-20th-century view

In 1918 in accordance with Treaty of Brest-Litovsk the city was a part of the Ukrainian People's Republic, Chernigov province, Surazh district. On July 11, 1919, as part of the Gomel province of the RSFSR, Surazh district. Since 1921 Klintsy became a district center in a part of the Gomel Voblast.

On 19 October 1937 the town became part of Oryol Oblast, and since July 5, 1944 is part of the Bryansk Oblast.

During World War II the town was occupied by German troops from August 20, 1941 to September 25, 1943. Consequently, the Jewish population, which constituted about one-fifth of the population at the start of the 20th century, was massacred. More than 3000 Jews were murdered by a mobile squad of Einsatzgruppen in the outskirts of the village. The Germans operated the Dulag 121 transit prisoner-of-war camp in the town.

In 1956 Klintsy had 33,000 inhabitants. The city was moderately affected by fallout from the Chernobyl accident in 1986.

During the Russian invasion of Ukraine, a Ukrainian drone strike caused a fire that affected four large storage tanks at an oil depot 60 km from the Ukrainian border, collectively holding 6,000 m^{3} (1,600,000 US gal) of oil.

== Economy ==
A historical centre of textile production, the city also houses enterprises of mechanical and leather industries.

== Demographics ==
Ethic composition according to the results of the 2021 Russian census:

Nationality	Number of People	Percent Share
Russians	51,537	81.73%
Ukrainians	107	0.17%
Belarusians	104	0.16%
Armenians	75	0.12%
Bashkirs	66	0.10%
Others	1,389	2.20%
No Stated Nationality	9,781	15.52%

== Culture ==
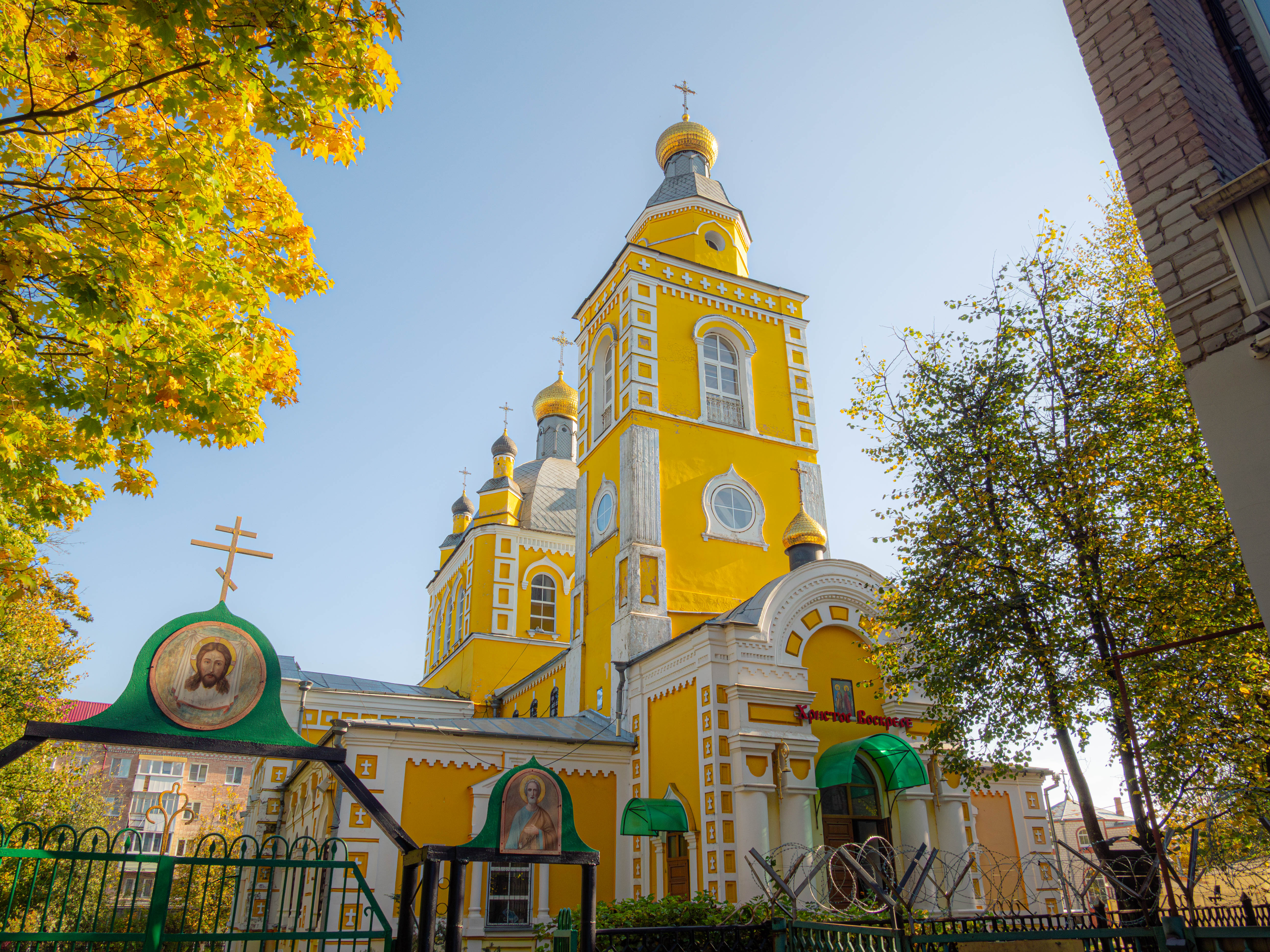
Saints Peter and Paul Cathedral

A famous native of Klintsy is Evgeny Belyaev (1926–1994) of the Alexandrov Ensemble. A children's music school in Klintsy is named after him, and a bust of him has been placed in the town. It is also the birthplace of the artist Jacob Kramer, who later emigrated to England to escape antisemitic persecution.

== Twin towns and sister cities ==
Klintsy is twinned with:

- Kyustendil, Bulgaria

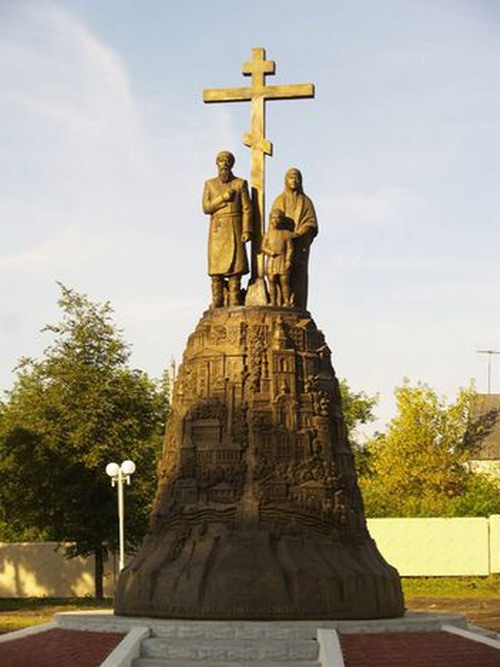
A monument to the founders of Klintsy
