= Bryansk Oblast =

First-level administrative division of Russia

Bryansk Oblast Брянская область (Russian)
- Oblast
- Flag Coat of arms
- Anthem: The Bryansk Forest Sternly Stirred
- Interactive map of Bryansk Oblast
- Coordinates: 52°57′N 33°24′E
- Country: Russia
- Federal district: Central
- Economic region: Central
- Established: July 5, 1944
- Administrative center: Bryansk

Government
  - Body: Oblast Duma
  - Governor: Yegor Kovalchuk (acting)

Area
  - Total: 34,857 km^{2} (13,458 sq mi)
  - Rank: 62nd

Population (2021 census)
  - Total: 1,169,161
  - Estimate (2018): 1,210,982
  - Rank: 40th
  - Density: 33.542/km^{2} (86.872/sq mi)
  - Urban: 69.5%
  - Rural: 30.5%

GDP (nominal, 2024)
  - Total: ₽724 billion (US$8.5 billion)
  - Per capita: ₽636,575 (US$7,469.7)
- Time zone: UTC+3 (MSK)
- ISO 3166 code: RU-BRY
- License plates: 32
- OKTMO ID: 15000000
- Official languages: Russian
- Website: www.bryanskobl.ru

Bryansk Oblast, (Note: Russian: Бря́нская о́бласть, romanized: Bryanskaya oblastʹ) also known as Bryanshchina, (Note: Брянщина, IPA: [ˈbrʲænʲɕːɪnə]) is a federal subject of Russia (an oblast). Its administrative center is the city of Bryansk. As of the 2021 Census, its population was 1,169,161.

== Geography ==
Bryansk Oblast lies in western European Russia in the central to western parts of the East European Plain, on the divide between the Desna and Volga basins. The oblast borders with Smolensk Oblast in the north, Kaluga Oblast in the northeast, Oryol Oblast in the east, Kursk Oblast in the southeast, Chernihiv and Sumy Oblasts of Ukraine in the south, and with Gomel and Mogilev Oblasts of Belarus in the west.

Natural resources include deposits of peat, sand, clay, chalk, marl, and other building materials, as well as phosphorite. About a quarter of the total area of the oblast is covered by forests, mainly coniferous, mixed, and deciduous, as well as forest-steppe.

Bryansky Les Nature Reserve is a biosphere reserve that protects, among other things, a limited population of European bison.

=== Ecology ===
As a result of the Chernobyl disaster on April 26, 1986, part of the territory of Bryansk Oblast (mainly Gordeyevsky, Klimovsky, Klintsovsky, Krasnogorsky, Surazhsky, and Novozybkovsky Districts) has been contaminated with radionuclides. In 1999, some 226,000 people, representing approximately 16% of the oblast's population, lived in areas with the contamination level above 5 Curie/km^{2}.

== History ==
The Venus of Eliseevichi is a piece of Paleolithic art (dated to 14,000 YBP) found in the region. The Eliseevichi site is also associated with the earliest recognized dog remains, dating to 15,000 YBP.

In the 9th to 11th centuries AD Slavic tribes lived along the banks of the Desna River and in the forests of the land between the Desna and the Oka. The city of Bryansk was established in 985.

Bryansk remained poorly attested until the 1237–1242 Mongol invasion of Kievan Rus'. It was the northernmost of the Severian cities in the possession of the Chernigov Rurikids and the Principality of Novgorod-Seversk. After the Mongols murdered Prince Mikhail of Chernigov in 1246 and his capital was destroyed, his son Roman Mikhailovich moved his seat to Bryansk. In 1310, when the Mongols sacked the town again, it belonged to the principality of Smolensk. After the Mongols took Chernigov, the Principality of Bryansk was formed. In 1356 Bryansk territory was under the authority of the Grand Duchy of Lithuania.

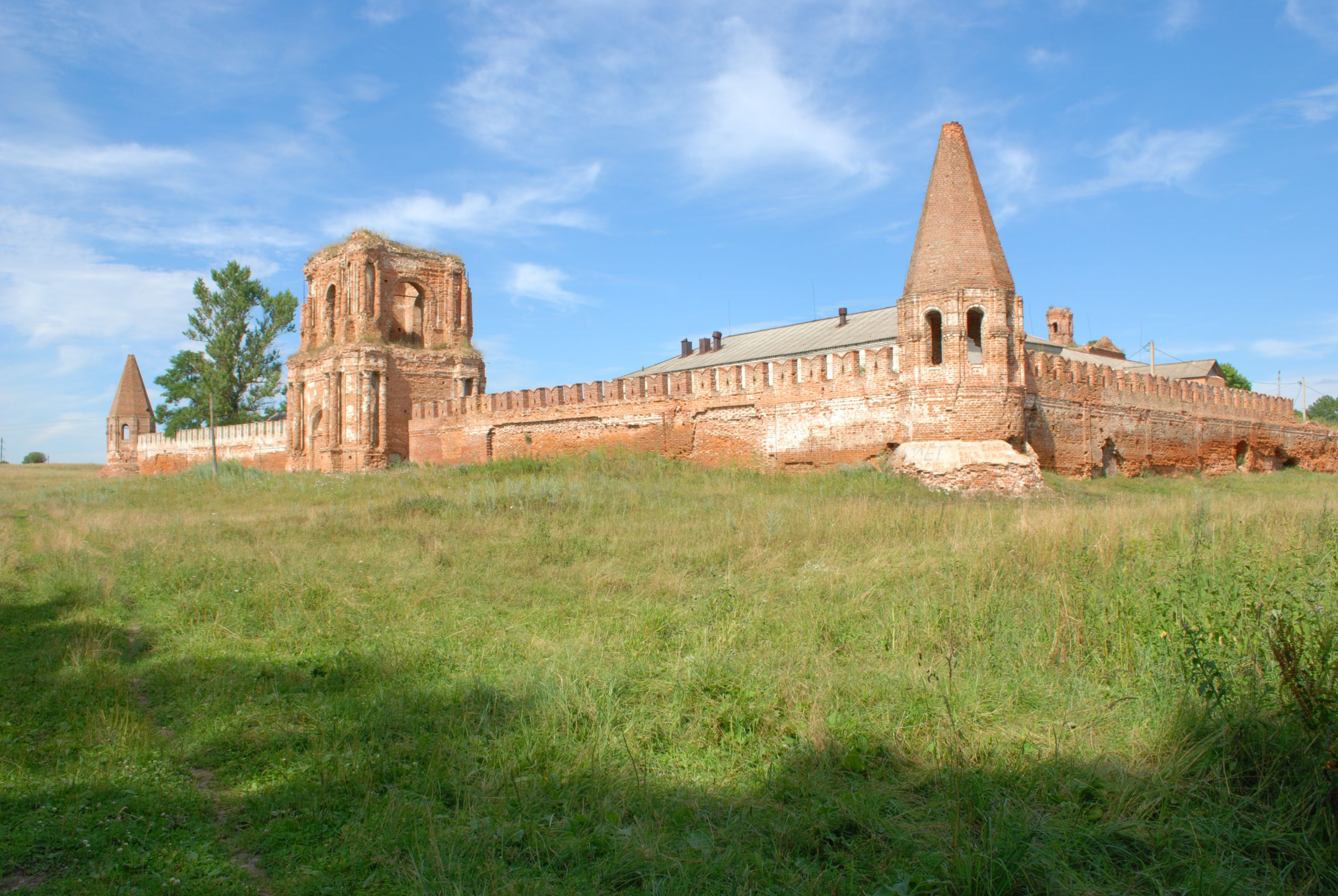
Holy Transfiguration monastery in Sevsk, one of the oldest cultural heritage monuments in the province

The Great Duchy of Moscow conquered Bryansk following the Battle of Vedrosha in 1503. The town was turned into a fortress that played a major role during the Time of Troubles of 1598–1613. Bryansk became Moscow's south-western outpost in the fights against Grand Duchy of Lithuania, Kingdom of Poland, and Crimean Khanate. In 1618 the Truce of Deulino saw the southern and western area of the modern Bryansk Oblast ceded to Poland.

After the annexation of the lands by the Tsardom of Russia in 1654, all the left bank of the Dnieper, including the south-western area of Bryansk, was divided into hundreds of administrative regiments. One of the largest was Starodub. In 1781, these regiments merged into districts and several territories.

Peter the Great (r. 1682–1725) incorporated Bryansk into the Kiev Governorate, but Empress Catherine the Great deemed it wise to transfer the town to the Oryol Governorate in 1779. She also promulgated the town's coat of arms.

In 1709, part of the Bryansk (Bryansky, Karachevsky, Sevsky, and Trubchevsky Uyezds) belonged to Kiev Governorate. In 1727, Sevsk Province became part of the newly formed Belgorod Governorate.

The 17th and 18th centuries saw a period of significant regional economic development. The industrial revolution began in the 18th century, particularly in the eastern part of Bryansk; due to its reserves of sand Bryansk saw the growth of the glass industry.

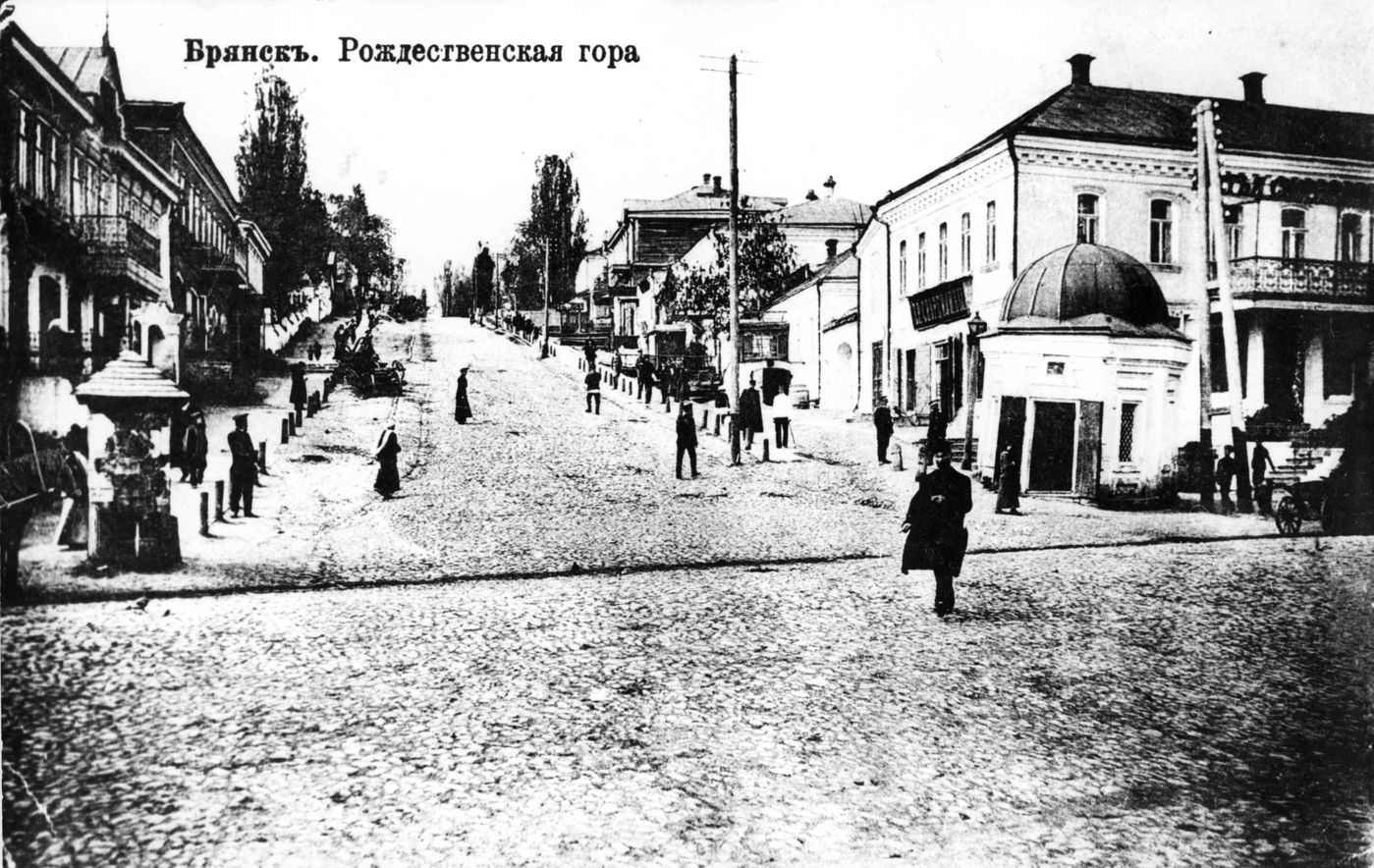
Bryansk in the 1900s

On April 1, 1920, Bryansk Oblast was established but on October 1, 1929 it was incorporated into the Western Oblast. On September 27, 1937, the Central Executive Committee of the Soviet Union decided to abolish the Western Krai, dividing it into Smolensk and Oryol Oblasts. The current territory of Bryansk Oblast became a part of Oryol Oblast.

In August–October 1941 Axis troops took over the region. From the first days of occupation, the struggle against the invaders took on the character of a popular movement. In the Bryansk area about 60,000 guerrillas from the guerrilla units of Sydir Kovpak, Oleksiy Fedorov and Alexander Saburov operated. The fighting resulted in the destruction and burning of many towns and villages, affecting some 111,000 homes and many important industrial enterprises. After the Red Army liberated the area (August–September 1943), extensive restoration work commenced.

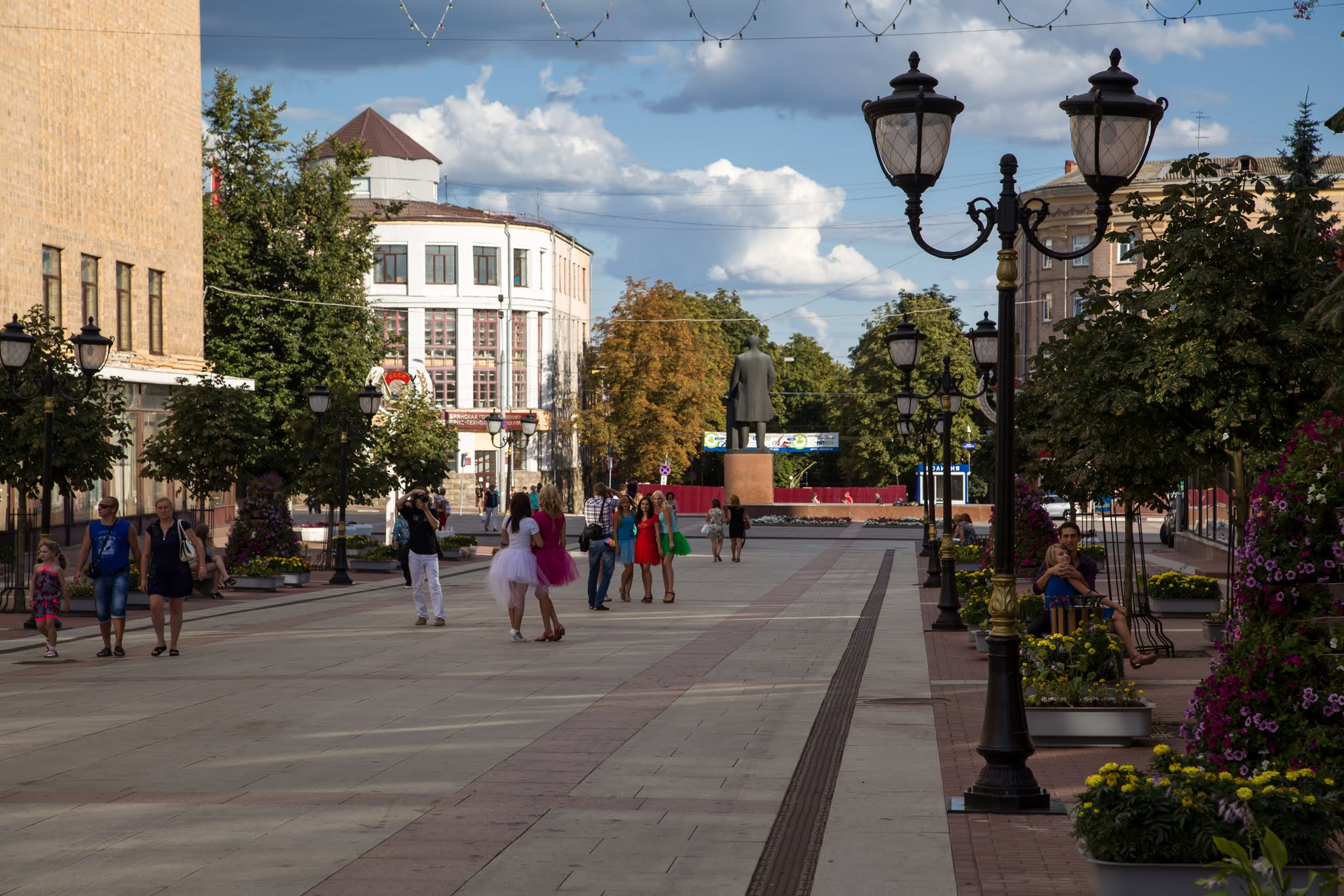
Bryansk in 2013

A decree of the Presidium of the Supreme Soviet of the USSR established the modern Bryansk Oblast on July 5, 1944. On 4 July 1997, Bryansk, alongside Chelyabinsk, Magadan, Saratov, and Vologda, signed a power-sharing agreement with the government of Russia, granting it autonomy. The power-sharing would be abolished on 9 August 2002.

On 2 March 2023, the villages of Lyubechane and Sushany were attacked by pro-Ukrainian forces during the Russo-Ukrainian War.

== Economy ==
=== Transportation ===
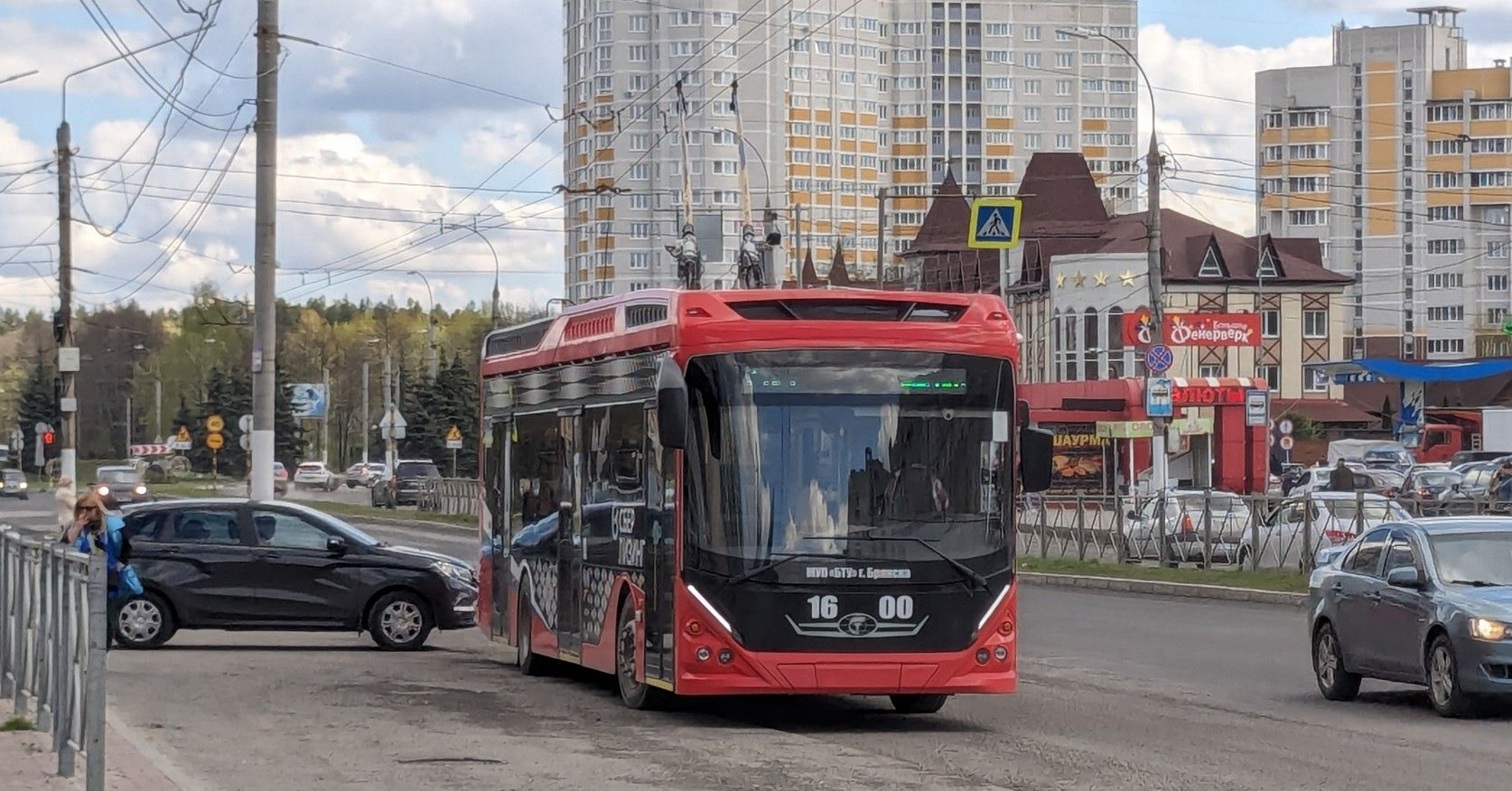
Trolleybus on Moscow avenue in Bryansk

A large railway junction is located in the capital of Bryansk. Most rail lines in the oblast are electrified, using AC power. In connection with the border situation, Bryansk there are several major customs terminals.

The oblast is crossed by the M3 Moscow—Kiev highway and the M13 Bryansk-Novozybkov-Boundary Belarus—(Kobrin), and fourteen kilometers from the administrative center of the oblast is the Bryansk International Airport.

=== Exports ===
The top exports of Bryansk Oblast in 2021 were railway and trams (15.6%), iron & steel (10.8%), wood (9.74%), and paper articles (9.32%). Nearly half of exports (46.3%) were to Belarus.

== Politics ==
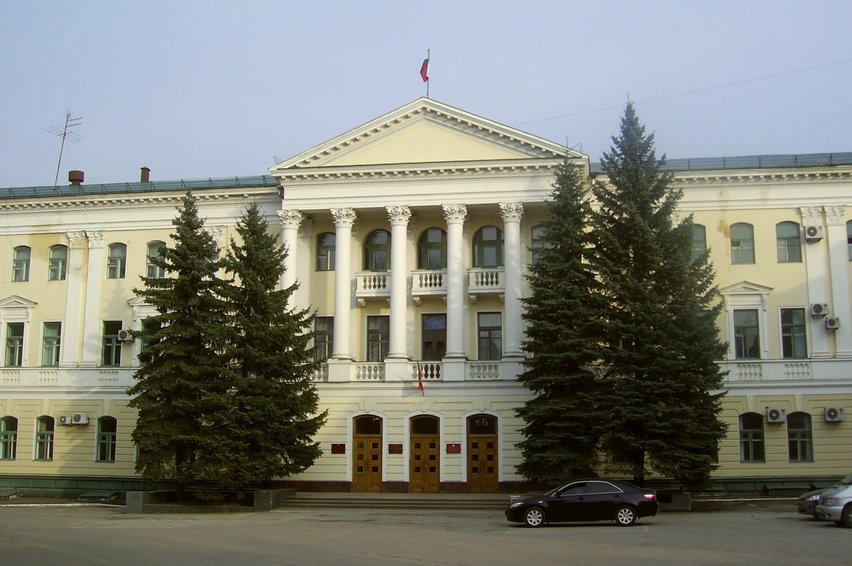
Oblast Duma seat in Bryansk

During the Soviet period, the high authority in the oblast was shared between three persons: the First Secretary of the Bryansk CPSU Committee (who in reality had the biggest authority), the Chairman of the oblast Soviet (legislative power), and the Chairman of the oblast Executive Committee (executive power). Since 1991, the CPSU lost all the power, and the head of the oblast administration, and eventually the governor, was appointed/elected alongside an elected regional parliament.

The Charter of Bryansk Oblast is the fundamental law of the region. The Bryansk Oblast Duma is the province's standing legislative (representative) body. The Legislative Assembly exercises its authority by passing laws, resolutions, and other legal acts and by supervising the implementation and observance of the laws and other legal acts passed by it. The highest executive body is the Oblast Government, which includes territorial executive bodies such as district administrations, committees, and commissions that facilitate development and run the day-to-day matters of the province. The Oblast administration supports the activities of the Governor who is the highest official and acts as guarantor of the observance of the oblast Charter under the Constitution of Russia.

The current governor of Bryansk Oblast since 2015 is Alexander Bogomaz, a member of the United Russia party. He was re-elected in 2020, winning 71.7% of the vote.

== Demographics ==
Historical population
Year	Pop.	±%
1926	2,006,438	—
1959	1,549,945	−22.8%
1970	1,581,950	+2.1%
1979	1,506,850	−4.7%
1989	1,474,785	−2.1%
2002	1,378,941	−6.5%
2010	1,278,217	−7.3%
2021	1,169,161	−8.5%
Source: Census data

Population: 1,169,161 (2021 census); 1,278,217 (2010 census); 1,378,941 (2002 census); 1,474,785 (1989 Soviet census).

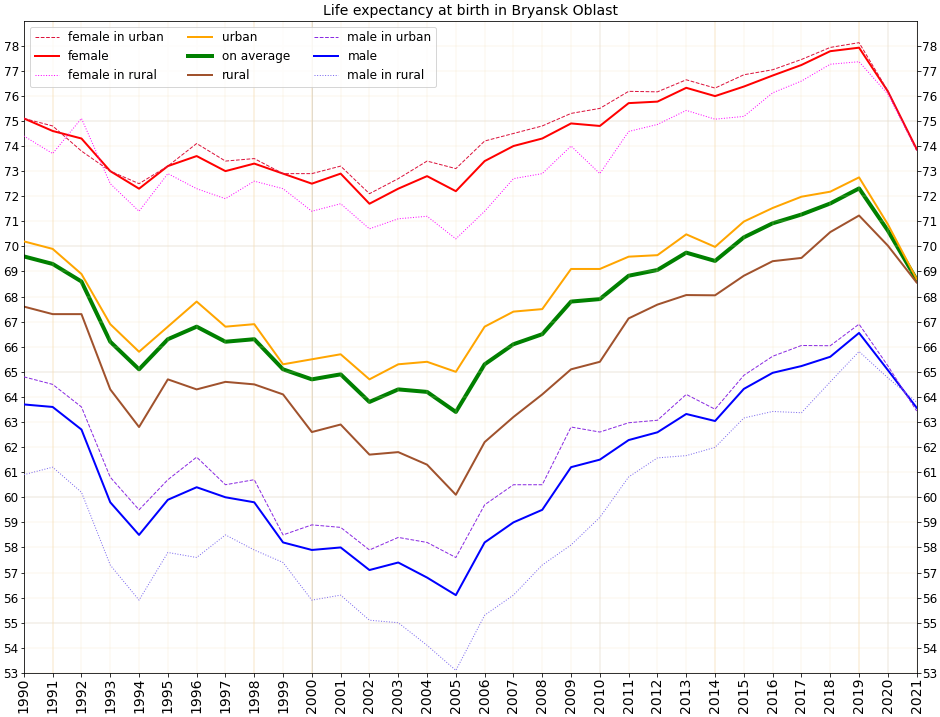
Life expectancy at birth in Bryansk Oblast

Vital statistics for 2024:

- Births: 7,371 (6.5 per 1,000)
- Deaths: 16,312 (14.3 per 1,000)

Total fertility rate (2024):
1.14 children per woman

Life expectancy (2021):
Total — 68.67 years (male — 63.57, female — 73.88)

=== Settlements ===
Largest cities or towns in Bryansk Oblast 2010 Russian Census
Rank		Administrative Division	Pop.
1	Bryansk	City of oblast significance of Bryansk	415,721
2	Klintsy	Town of oblast significance of Klintsy	62,510
3	Novozybkov	Town of oblast significance of Novozybkov	40,553
4	Dyatkovo	Dyatkovsky District	29,439
5	Unecha	Unechsky District	26,197
6	Karachev	Karachevsky District	19,715
7	Starodub	Town of oblast significance of Starodub	19,010
8	Zhukovka	Zhukovsky District	18,269
9	Seltso	Town of oblast significance of Seltso	17,934
10	Pochep	Pochepsky District	17,161

=== Ethnic composition ===
- Russians – 96.7%
- Ukrainians – 1.1%
- Belarusians – 0.4%
- Armenians – 0.4%
- Romani people – 0.3%
- Jews – 0.1%
- Others – 1%
- 26,825 people were registered from administrative databases, and could not declare an ethnicity. It is estimated that the proportion of ethnicities in this group is the same as that of the declared group.

=== Religion ===
Religion in Bryansk Oblast as of 2012 (Sreda Arena Atlas)
Russian Orthodoxy	49.5%
Other Orthodox	0.8%
Other Christians	5.0%
Rodnovery and other native faiths	0.7%
Spiritual but not religious	36%
Atheism and irreligion	5.4%
Other and undeclared	2.6%

According to a 2012 survey 49.5% of the population of Bryansk Oblast adheres to the Russian Orthodox Church, 4.7% are unaffiliated Christians, 0.8% are Orthodox Christian believers who don't belong to any church or are members of other (non-Russian) Orthodox churches, and 0.7% are adherents of Rodnovery (Slavic folk religion). In addition, 36% of the population declares to be "spiritual but not religious", 5.4% is atheist, and 2.6% follows other religions or did not give an answer to the question.

== Culture ==
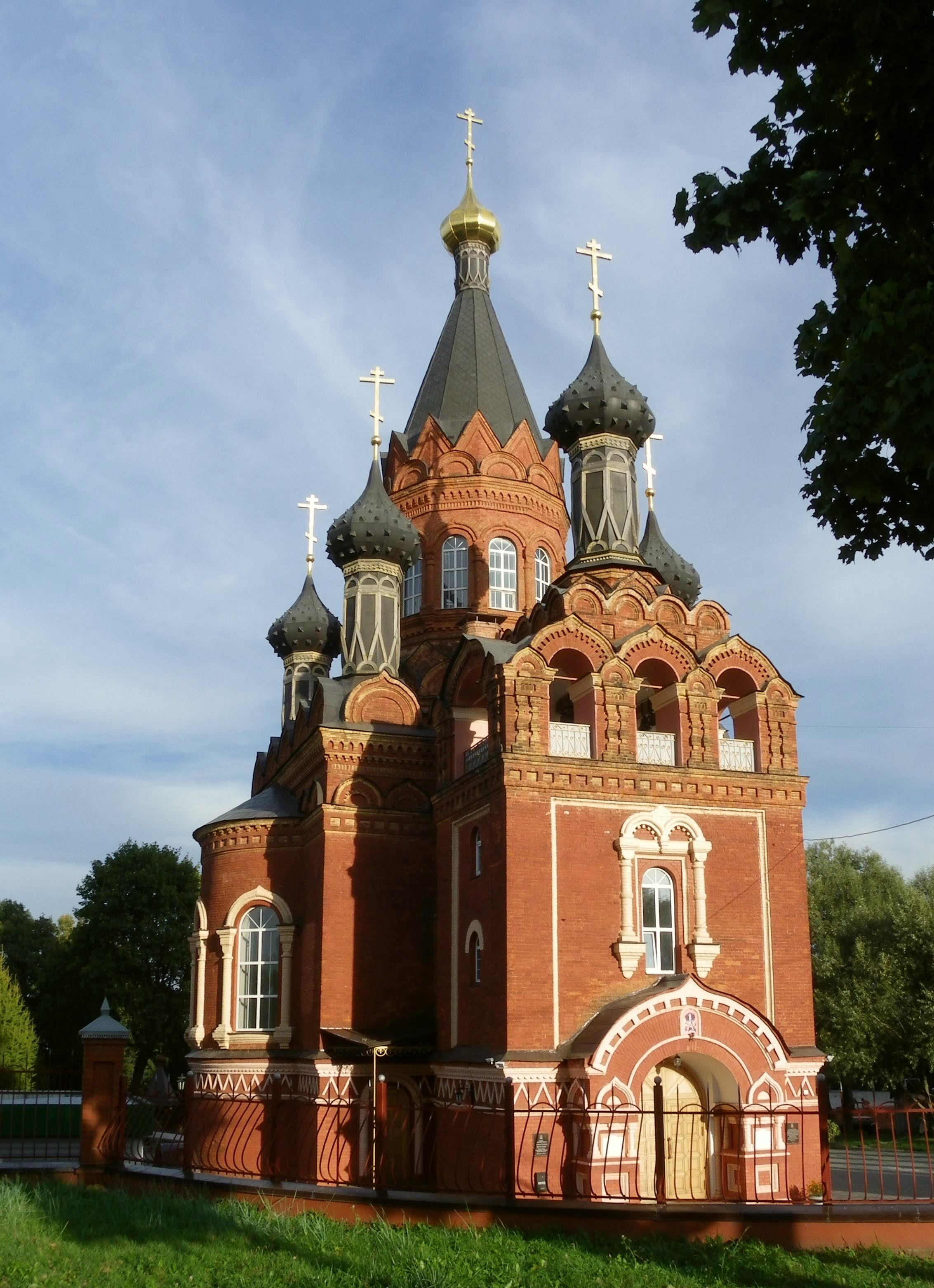
The Spaso-Grobovskaya built in 1904

There are seventeen museums in Bryansk Oblast. The main cities have many major architectural and archeological monuments. In Bryansk is the Svenski monastery, Chashin mound (the birthplace of Bryansk), the ancient Kremlin of Bryansk on Pokrovskaya Mountain, Peter and Paul monastery etc. Main churches include the Voksresenskaya, Vvedenskaya, and Spaso-Grobovskaya, Pokrovskaya and Gorne-Nikolskaya.

Klintsy is the second-largest city of Bryansk oblast. It was one of the Old Believers' centers, now known for its textile industry and ancient temples. Trubchevsk is noted for its archeological and architectural monuments, in particular the Trinity Cathedral of the 13th–19th centuries with its tomb. The museum contains some valuable items dated to the 6th–7th centuries.

== Sights ==
"'Church of the Ascension in the village of Veliky Bor'"

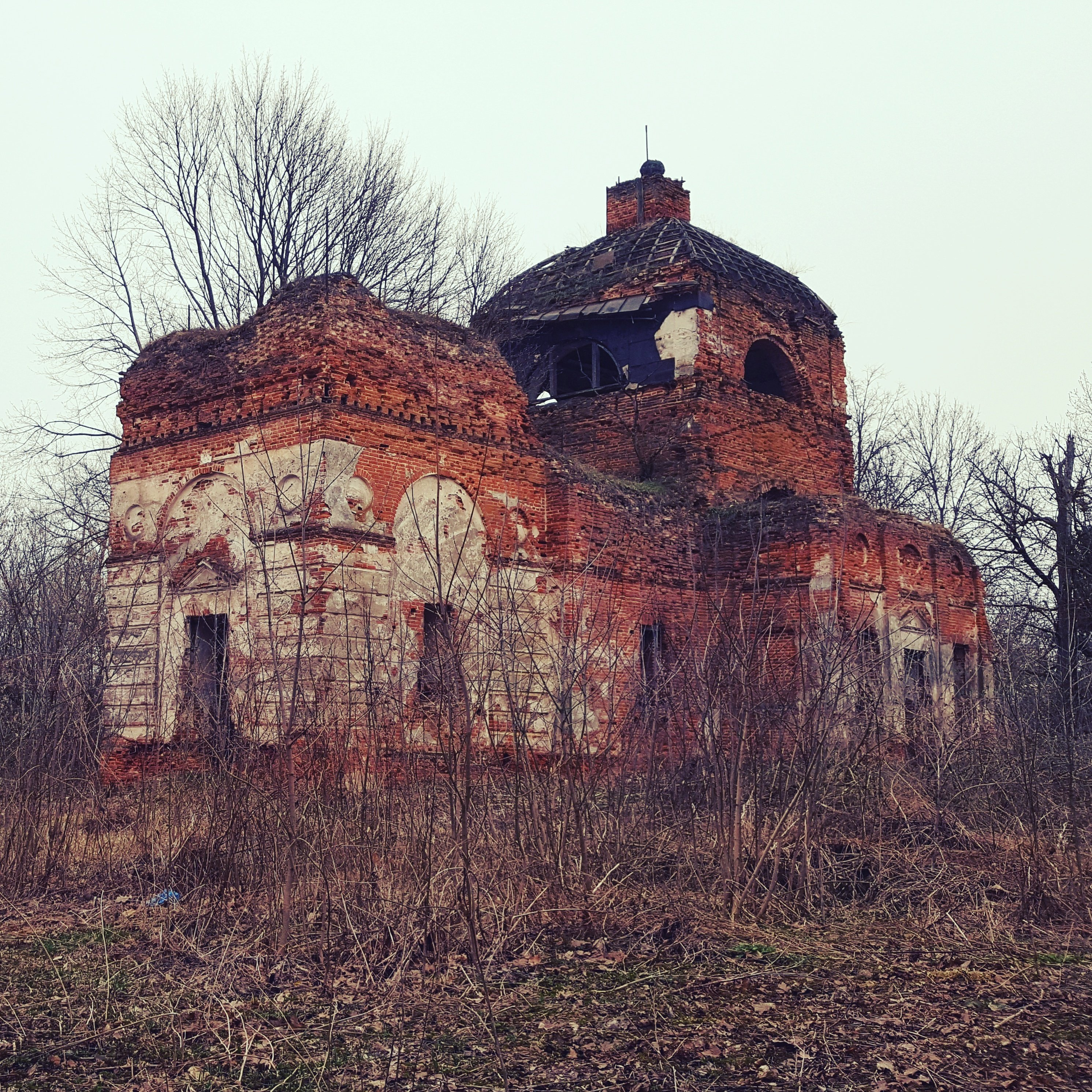
Ruins of the church in the village Veliky Bor of Gordeevsky district of Bryansk region built in 1809

The supplier on the hill of intermediaries is the compositional center of his development. Year of construction of the church (by order of Count Bezborodko) – 1809. By now, the side porticos and the top of the bell tower have been lost. An interesting example of a cross-shaped manor church in the style of mature classicism. Around the building were comparatively short sidearms, which were slightly protruding rectangular altars ending in a lowered semicircular apse.

The originality of the composition is given by a large light quadrangle towering over the center with a tetrahedral dome cover and a small dome on a cubic pedestal. A small refectory with one window on the side facades is adjoined by a preserved quadrangle of the bell tower. A profiled belt bypasses all facades of the building at the level of the apse cornice. Four Tuscan pilasters decorating the ends of the side arms correspond to the columns of the lost porticoes.

Between them, in the center, there are side entrances marked with triangular sandrids, and on the sides – rectangular windows. Above the openings, there are, respectively, an oval and two round niches. A large semicircular three-part Empire-type window is cut in the upper part of each quadrangle facet. The tier of the bell tower is decorated with large flat-arched niches in the center of the facets, rusticated corner parts to the waist, and round niches-medallions above it. In the interior, all the side parts are completely open into the high central one, forming a single space of the temple.

The central part is covered with a four-lane closed vault, the altar is covered with a conch, and the altar vima, the side arms, and the refectory are covered with cylindrical vaults. The lower tier of the bell tower with rounded inner corners has a corrugated vault along the north–south axis. On the sides of the trapezoidal passage to the refectory, there are small rooms with a staircase in the southern one. Only the plaster cornices at the base of the vaults and at the top of the main quadrangle, as well as pilasters between the windows on the north and south walls, have survived from the interior decoration.

== Heraldry ==
The Flag of Bryansk Oblast represents a panel burgundy with a ratio of 1:1,5. In the center of the cloth is placed the coat of arms of the Bryansk region and includes a hammer and sickle up top. The coat of arms is a blue shield representing Slavic unity between the states of Russia, Belarus, and Ukraine. In the upper part of the shield is a stylized golden spruce with a three-tiered crown representing the forests of Bryansk. The flag is burgundy in color, representing the color of the banners under which the army and guerrillas fought for the liberation of Bryansk.
