= Bzhedugs =

Circassian tribe

Bzhedug
Бжъэдыгъу
- The tamgas of the Hadjemuqo and Akhedjaguqo princely dynasties, who ruled the western and eastern regions of Bzhedug, and the Circassian flag

Languages
- Adyghe (Bzhedug dialect), Russian, Turkish

Religion
- Islam

Related ethnic groups
- Other Circassian tribes

The Bzhedugh (Adyghe: Бжъэдыгъу, pronounced [bʐɐdɘʁʷ]; Russian: Бжедуги; Turkish: Bjeduğlar) are one of the twelve major Circassian tribes.

Many of them immigrated to Turkey in the 1860s, but there is still a community of Bzhedug on the left bank of the Kuban River (in the vicinity of Krasnodar). The Bzhedug people live in Adygea and Krasnodar Krai, and are well represented in the Adyghe (Circassian) diaspora in all countries of residence. Even in ancient times the Bzhedug people were divided into four tribes.

== History ==
The Bzhedugs originally lived in the area of Shahe River, between Tuapse and Sochi. Later they divided in two groups: those who lived close to the Black Sea (Abhiaskis) and Adygeans (territory of Kuban River). This migration was caused by overpopulation and warlike neighbors to their Black Sea's territories. Bzhedug were subdivided into Cherchenay (Psekups River and Pshish River) and Himish area (Afips River and Psekups River). They were involved in cattle breeding and agriculture, growing mostly crops and corn.

== Language ==
The Bzhedugs people speak a dialect (Adyghe: Бжъэдыгъубзэ, Bz̄edyğwbze) of the Adyghe language.

== Villages ==
There are 48 Circassian villages in Republic of Adygea, 26 of which are Bzhedug villages (54% of the villages in Adygea).

Circassian	Russian
Хьэлъэкъуай Hetlequai	Гатлукай
Бжъэдыгъухьабл Brzhedyghuhabl	Бжедугхабль
Красногвардейскэ Krasnogvardeiske	Красногвардейское
Аскъэлай Asqelai	Ассоколай
Очэпщый Ochepschyi	Вочепший
Гъобэкъуай Ghobequai	Габукай
Джэджэхьабл Dzhedzhehabl	Джиджихабль
Казазовэ Kazazove	Казазово
Къунчыкъухьабл Qunchyquhabl	Кончукохабль
Нэчрэзый Nechrezyi	Нечерезий
Нэшъукъуай Nershuquai	Нешукай
Очэпщый-кIэ Ochepschyi-k’e	Нововочепший
Пэнэжъыкъуай Penerzhyquai	Понежукай
ПчыхьалІыкъуай Pchyhatl’yquai	Пчегатлукай
Пщыкъуйхьабл Pschyquihabl	Пшикуйхабль
Тэуехьабл Teuehabl	Тауйхабль
Лъэустэнхьабл Tleustenhabl	Тлюстенхабль
Тыгъургъой Tyghurghoi	Тугургой
Козэт Kozet	Козет
Адыгея-кIэ Adygeia-k’e	Новая Адыгея
БжыхьэкъоякI Bzhyhaqoiak’	Новобжегокай
Бжыхьэкъоежъ Bzhyhaqoierzh	Старобжегокай
Тэхъутэмыкъуай Texutemyquai	Тахтамукай
Щынджый Schyndzhyi	Шенджий
Инэм Inem	Энем
Яблоновск Iablonovsk	Яблоновский
Къэзынкъуай Qezynquai	

== See also ==
- Circassians#Tribes
- Shapsugs
- Abzakhs
- Zhaney
- Mamkhegh
- Natukhai
- Temirgoy
- Hatuqwai
- Besleney
- Circassian genocide
