= Krasnogvardeysky District, Adygea =

Krasnogvardeysky District Красногвардейский район (Russian)
- District

Other transcription(s)
  - Adyghe: Красногвардейскэ къедзыгъо
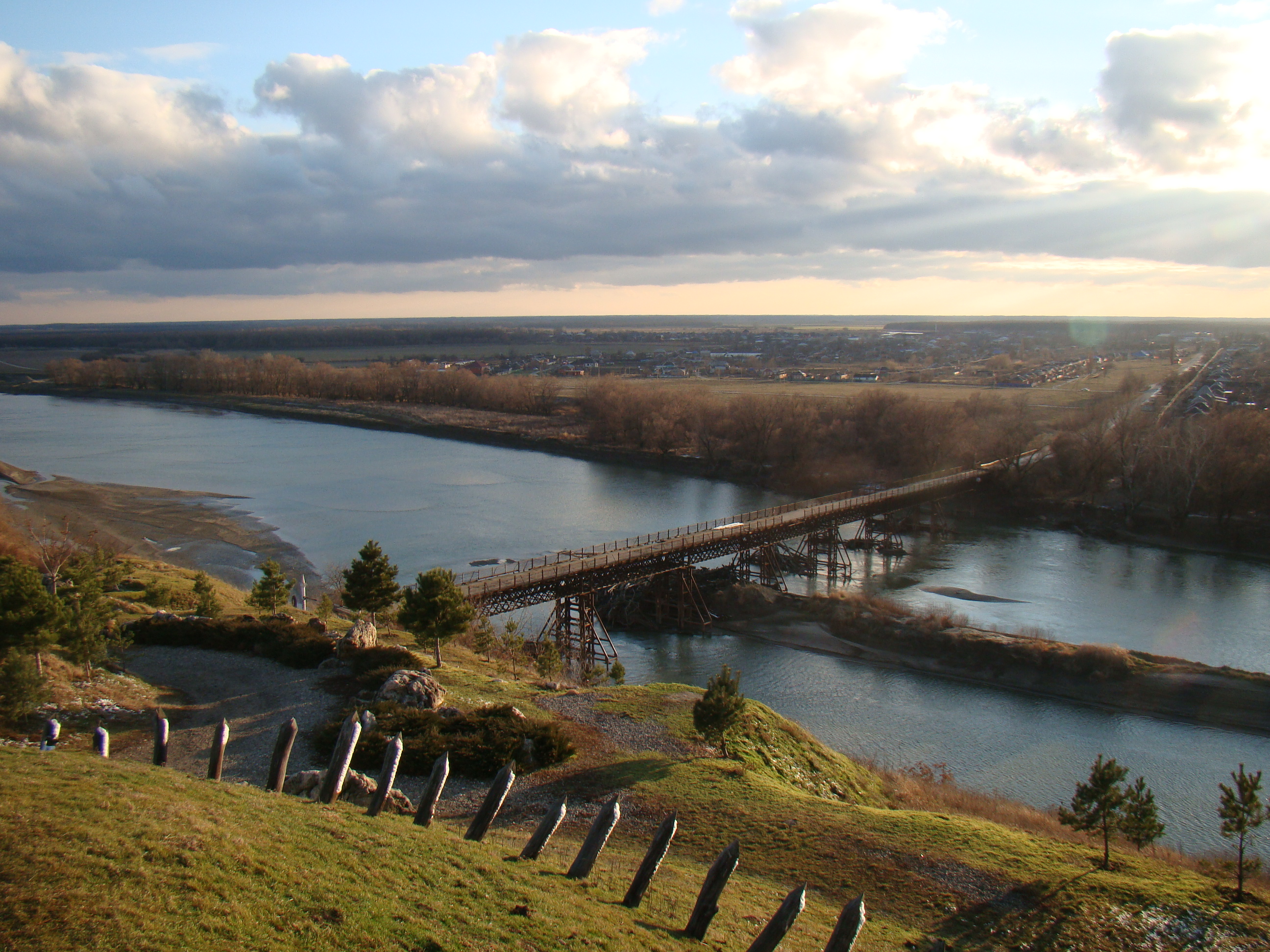
- View of the aul of Khatukay in Krasnogvardeysky District

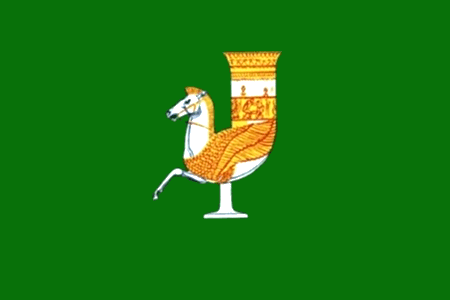
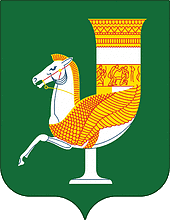
- Flag Coat of arms
- Location of Krasnogvardeysky District in the Republic of Adygea
- Coordinates: 45°07′N 39°34′E
- Country: Russia
- Federal subject: Republic of Adygea
- Established: February 7, 1929
- Administrative center: Krasnogvardeyskoye

Government
  - Type: Local government
  - Head: Vyacheslav Tkhitlyanov

Area
  - Total: 725.52 km^{2} (280.12 sq mi)

Population (2010 Census)
  - Total: 30,868
  - Density: 42.546/km^{2} (110.19/sq mi)
  - Urban: 0%
  - Rural: 100%

Administrative structure
  - Inhabited localities: 25 rural localities

Municipal structure
  - Municipally incorporated as: Krasnogvardeysky Municipal District
  - Municipal divisions: 0 urban settlements, 7 rural settlements
- Time zone: UTC+3 (MSK)
- OKTMO ID: 79618000
- Website: http://amokr.ru

Population of Krasnogvardeysky District
- 2010 Census: 30,868
- 2002 Census: 31,536
- 1989 Census: 29,953
- 1979 Census: 31,665

Krasnogvardeysky District (Russian: Красногварде́йский райо́н; Adyghe: Красногвардейскэ къедзыгъо) is an administrative and a municipal district (raion), one of the seven in the Republic of Adygea, Russian Federation. It is located in the northwest of the republic and borders with Ust-Labinsky District of Krasnodar Krai in the north, Shovgenovsky District in the east, Belorechensky District of Krasnodar Krai in the south, and with Krasnodar Reservoir in the west. Its borders with Teuchezhsky District (in the west) and Dinskoy District of Krasnodar Krai (in the northwest) pass through the waters of Krasnodar Reservoir. The area of the district is 725.52 square kilometers (280.12 sq mi). Its administrative center is the rural locality (a selo) of Krasnogvardeyskoye. As of the 2010 Census, the total population of the district was 30,868, with the population of Krasnogvardeyskoye accounting for 30.6% of that number.

== History ==
The district was established on February 7, 1929. It was transformed into a rural district on February 1, 1963, but this was reversed on January 12, 1965. The district has been dealing with mass illegal immigration of ethnic Kurds in recent years.

== Administrative and municipal status ==
Within the framework of administrative divisions, Krasnogvardeysky District is one of the seven in the Republic of Adygea and has administrative jurisdiction over all of its twenty-five rural localities. As a municipal division, the district is incorporated as Krasnogvardeysky Municipal District. Its twenty-five rural localities are incorporated into seven rural settlements within the municipal district. The selo of Krasnogvardeyskoye serves as the administrative center of both the administrative and municipal district.

=== Municipal composition ===
1. Beloselskoye Rural Settlement (Белосельское)
  Administrative center: selo of Beloye
  other localities of the rural settlement:
  - khutor of Bogursukov
  - settlement of Mirny
  - selo of Novosevastopolskoye
  - khutor of Papenkov
  - selo of Preobrazhenskoye
2. Bolshesidorovskoye Rural Settlement (Большесидоровское)
  Administrative center: selo of Bolshesidorovskoye
  other localities of the rural settlement:
  - aul of Dzhambichi
3. Khatukayskoye Rural Settlement (Хатукайское)
  Administrative center: aul of Khatukay
  other localities of the rural settlement:
  - settlement of Lesnoy
  - settlement of Naberezhny
  - settlement of Svobodny
  - settlement of Vodny
4. Krasnogvardeyskoye Rural Settlement (Красногвардейское)
  Administrative center: selo of Krasnogvardeyskoye
  other localities of the rural settlement:
  - aul of Adamy
  - khutor of Chumakov
5. Sadovoye Rural Settlement (Садовое)
  Administrative center: selo of Sadovoye
  other localities of the rural settlement:
  - aul of Bzhedugkhabl
  - selo of Verkhnenazarovskoye
6. Ulyapskoye Rural Settlement (Уляпское)
  Administrative center: aul of Ulyap
  other localities of the rural settlement:
  - selo of Shturbino
7. Yelenovskoye Rural Settlement (Еленовское)
  Administrative center: selo of Yelenovskoye
  other localities of the rural settlement:
  - khutor of Doguzhiyev
  - khutor of Pustosyolov
  - khutor of Saratovsky
