= List of administrative and municipal divisions of Adygea =

Republic of Adygea, Russia
- Flag
- Capital: Maykop

Administrative structure (as of 2014):
  - Administrative districts: 7
  - Cities/towns: 2
  - Urban-type settlements: 3
  - Rural localities: 227
  - Uninhabited rural localities (as of 2010): 6

Municipal structure (as of 2014):
  - Municipal districts: 7
  - Urban okrugs: 2
  - Urban settlements: 3
  - Rural settlements: 48

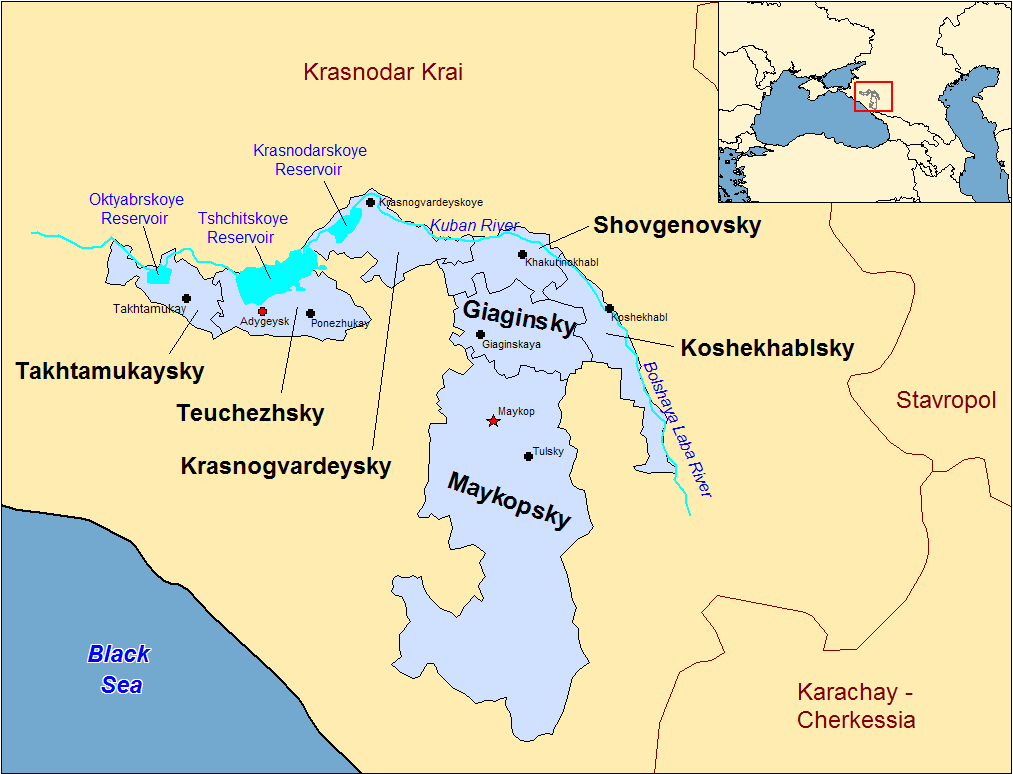
Map of the administrative divisions of the Republic of Adygea

The Republic of Adygea, an enclave within Krasnodar Krai located at the foothills of the Caucasus Mountains, is a federal subject of Russia. It was originally established in 1922 as the Cherkess (Adyghe) Autonomous Oblast within the Russian SFSR for the Adyghe (Circassian) majority that lived in the area. As of the 2010 Census, Adyghe people accounted for 25.2% of the republic's population (107,048 people), while Russians accounted for the majority 63.6% (270,714 people).

Since establishing and maintaining the structure of the administrative divisions of the federal subjects is not explicitly specified in the Constitution of Russia as the responsibility of the federal government, this task falls within the scope of the responsibilities of the Republic of Adygea itself. Changes to the administrative-territorial structure of the republic are authorized by the State Council.

The republic's administrative divisions remained largely unchanged from the structure used during the Soviet era, with the notable exception of selsoviets—a low-level administrative unit type abolished after the new law on the administrative-territorial divisions had been adopted in May 2000. As of 2014, the republic's administrative-territorial divisions include seven administrative districts (raions) and two republican urban okrugs. The districts have administrative jurisdiction over the inhabited localities located on their territory. Territories of the republican urban okrugs are separate from the districts and include a city/town of the republican significance, as well as one or several inhabited localities in their vicinity which had historically been administratively subordinated to that city/town.

The system of local self-governance, which Article 12 of the Constitution of Russia guarantees, is implemented on the republic's territory in accordance with the provisions of Federal Law No. 131-FZ On the General Principles of the Organization of the Local Self-Government in the Russian Federation. While the law does not require any connection between the system of the administrative-territorial divisions of a federal subject and its municipal structure, Adygea's administrative districts are nevertheless incorporated as the municipal districts and the republican urban okrugs are incorporated as the municipal urban okrugs. On the lower level, the municipal districts are divided into municipal urban settlements, which combine an urban-type settlement and adjacent rural localities, and municipal rural settlements, which combine several neighboring rural localities.

== Historical background ==
Cherkess (Adyghe) Autonomous Oblast was established within the Russian SFSR on July 27, 1922 from Krasnodar and Maykop Departments of Kuban-Black Sea Oblast, and remained in jurisdiction of Kuban-Black Sea Oblast. Within a month, on August 24, 1922, it was renamed "Adyghe (Cherkess) Autonomous Oblast", before becoming "Adyghe Autonomous Oblast" on August 3, 1928. Initially, the autonomous oblast consisted of three okrugs: Farssky, Psekupsky, and Shirvansky, which were further subdivided into the total of forty-two volosts. As the territory the autonomous oblast encompassed was wholly rural, it had no administrative center, so its government was located in nearby Krasnodar. On October 24, 1923, Shirvansky Okrug was dissolved and divided between Farssky and Psekupsky Okrugs, while the total number of volosts was reduced from forty-two to nineteen. On August 5, 1924, both okrugs and all volosts were abolished and the autonomous oblast was re-organized into five districts, which were officially recognized on September 2, 1924 along with thirty-two new selsoviets into which those districts were divided.

On June 2, 1924, when Kuban-Black Sea Oblast was abolished, the autonomous oblast was first subordinated to South-Eastern Krai and later, on October 16, 1924, to North Caucasus Krai. No other significant changes occurred until February 7, 1929, when the five districts were re-organized into three (Krasnogvardeysky, Psekupsky, and Shovgenovsky). When North Caucasus Krai was split on January 10, 1934, Adyghe Autonomous Oblast was subordinated to the newly created Azov-Black Sea Krai. On December 28, 1934, the three districts of the autonomous oblast were once again re-organized into five (Koshekhablsky, Krasnogvardeysky, Ponezhukaysky, Shovgenovsky, and Takhtamukaysky), due to the directive to downsize the districts in Azov-Black Sea Krai.

During the 1930s, as part of the changing Soviet policy towards its ethnic territories, a decision was made to increase the proportion of ethnic Russians in the autonomous oblast. On April 10, 1936, the predominantly Russian city of Maykop, as well as Giaginsky District and Khansky Selsoviet of Maykopsky District, became a part of the autonomous oblast (with the selsoviet having been incorporated into Giaginsky District). At the same time, the administrative center of the autonomous oblast was moved from Krasnodar to Maykop. Tuapse, a port on the Black Sea, was considered for the role of the administrative center, but the idea was rejected as it would give the native population access to the sea.

On September 13, 1937, Azov-Black Sea Krai was split into Krasnodar Krai and Rostov Oblast, and Adyghe Autonomous Oblast was subordinated to the former. Maykopsky District was formed on February 21, 1940, into which Tulsky District of Krasnodar Krai was merged on April 28, 1962. Since then, Adygea's external borders remained unchanged.

On July 15, 1940, Ponezhukaysky District was renamed Teuchezhsky after Adyghe poet Tsuga Teuchezh. On December 7, 1956, the districts of the autonomous oblast were enlarged: the territory of Shovgenovsky District was divided among Giaginsky, Koshekhablsky, and Krasnogvardeysky Districts, while Techezhsky District was merged into Takhtamukaysky District. This enlargement, however, did not prove successful, so on August 5, 1957 Takhtamukaysky District was split back into Takhtamukaysky and Teuchezhsky Districts within their old borders. At the same time, Takhtamukaysky District was renamed Oktyabrsky. Shovgenovsky District was restored in its old borders on March 21, 1958. On February 1, 1963, changes in administrative and territorial structure of the autonomous oblast led to the abolition of Koshekhablsky, Maykopsky, and Oktyabrsky Districts: Koshekhablsky District was merged into Shovgenovsky, Maykopsky District into Giaginsky, and Oktyabrsky District into Teuchezhsky. This change, however, was reverted in 1965, when, after several changes, the autonomous oblast became divided into six districts (Giaginsky, Koshekhablsky, Krasnogvardeysky, Maykopsky, Shovgenovsky, and Teuchezhsky). On April 25, 1983, a new Oktyabrsky District was formed from the western part of the territory of Teuchezhsky District; its old name of Takhtamukaysky District was restored in 1990.

On June 28, 1991, a few months before the dissolution of the Soviet Union, the autonomous oblast declared its sovereignty and separated from Krasnodar Krai. It was subsequently recognized as the Republic of Adygea within the Russian SFSR and retained its status of a republic within the Russian Federation after the formal dissolution of the Soviet Union in December 1991. Between 2004 and 2006, attempts were made to merge the republic with Krasnodar Krai, but the proposal met with strong resistance from the native Adyghe population and was eventually put to rest. The results of a 2011 opinion poll showed that 83% of the population of Adygea and over 90% of the population of Krasnodar Krai regard a potential merger in an unfavorable light.

== Administrative division structure ==
The modern administrative-territorial division of the Republic of Adygea is regulated by Law No. 171 of May 5, 2000 with subsequent amendments. The Law establishes the administrative units described below.

=== Administrative districts ===
A district (район) is an administrative-territorial unit with an administrative center (usually the district's largest settlement). Districts govern the urban and rural localities (see below) located on their territories, but not the cities/towns of the republican significance.

=== Republican urban okrugs ===
A republican urban okrug (республиканский городской округ) is an administrative-territorial unit which includes a city of the republican significance and one or several other inhabited localities.

== Types of inhabited localities ==
Inhabited localities (населённые пункты) comprise urban localities and rural localities, and are not considered to be administrative-territorial units on their own.

=== Urban localities ===
The different types of the urban localities (городские населённые пункты) are urban areas whose populations exceed the thresholds given below:

==== City/town ====
A city/town (город; see the notes about terminology) in the Republic of Adygea is a type of urban locality. Two types of cities/towns exist:

- The status of a city/town of the republican significance (город республиканского значения) can be granted to a city/town that:

has a population exceeding fifteen thousand;
has developed industries;
may be regarded as an economic and cultural center.

Whether or not a candidate city/town qualifies as an economic and cultural center with developed industries is discussed and decided individually in each case. Inhabited localities with populations of less than fifteen thousand can be granted the status of a "town of the republican significance" when they can demonstrate playing an important industrial, social, cultural, or historical role and have the potential for further growth.

- The status of a town of the district significance (город районного значения) can be granted to a town that:

has a population of at least twelve thousand;
has no less than 85% of its population consisting of blue and white-collar families;
may be regarded as an industrial and cultural center.

As of 2014, no towns within the republic enjoy this status.

==== Urban-type settlement ====
An urban-type settlement (посёлок городского типа) in the Republic of Adygea is a type of urban locality. This status can be granted to an inhabited locality that:

has a population of at least three thousand;
has no less than 85% of its population consisting of blue and white-collar families;
has industrial enterprises, railway junctions, water-control structures, facilities for processing agricultural products, educational or research establishments, or other objects of economic importance located within its territory.

In cases where the potential for further economic and social development and population growth can be demonstrated, inhabited localities with populations of less than three thousand may be granted urban-type settlement status.

As of 2014, three inhabited localities within the republic enjoy this status.

==== Suburban (dacha) settlement ====
A suburban (dacha) settlement (дачный посёлок) in the Republic of Adygea is a type of urban locality. This status can be granted to an inhabited locality that has the main purpose of providing sanatory or summer recreation facilities to visiting populations. A suburban settlement is not defined by population level and retains its status even if most of its population become permanent residents.

As of 2014, no inhabited localities within the republic enjoy this status.

==== Resort settlement ====
A resort settlement (курортный посёлок) in the Republic of Adygea is a type of urban locality. This status can be granted to an inhabited locality that:

has a population of at least two thousand;
has no less than half its population consisting of visitors arriving for medical treatment or recreation;
is located in an area whose primary purpose is sanatory.

As of 2014, no inhabited localities within the republic enjoy this status.

=== Rural localities ===
Rural localities (сельские населённые пункты) are localities which are not classified as urban and whose populations are mostly employed in agriculture. The different types described below each have their own histories, but all at present are regarded as equal in status.

==== Auls ====
Historically, auls were a Circassian type of rural locality. Many of the present-day auls were founded during 1850 to 1925, when the Adyghe people were subject to mass deportations as a consequence of the Caucasian War of 1817–1864. These auls tend to be located in mountainous or otherwise difficult-to-access terrains, while most of those established after the Caucasian War are found on the plains beside the Caucasus Mountains.

As of 2014, there are forty-one auls in the republic, mostly located in the western, northern, and northeastern parts of the republic. Most of them lie along the left banks of the Kuban and Laba Rivers, and along the southern shores of Krasnodar Reservoir. Each typically has a population between two and five thousand, averaging 1,620. Together they account for 18.1% of the republic's rural localities and 31% of the rural population.

==== Khutors ====
Khutors are a smaller type of rural locality. Typically, those that appeared before 1900 were established by landowners, while those created during the first half of the 20th century encompassed public land.

As of 2014, there are 102 khutors in the republic, mostly found in three areas: to the north of Maykop; in the northeast, along the Laba River; and in the predominantly aul zone in the western part of the republic. Each usually has a population of between one and five hundred, although some exceed one thousand. Together they account for 44.9% of the republic's rural localities, but only for 15% of the rural population. In 1926, the populations in 4% of the khutors exceeded five hundred; by 2000, this had risen to 18%.

==== Selos ====
Historically, selos were a type of Russian rural locality, consisting of a large village with a church. Most selos in the republic were established in the second half of the 19th century on lands abandoned by the Circassians.

As of 2014, there are nineteen selos in the republic, most commonly found between the eastern shore of Krasnodar Reservoir and the left bank of the Laba River (near its source). Each typically has a population between two and four thousand, averaging 1,600. Together they account for 8.4% of the republic's rural localities and 15% of its rural population.

==== Settlements ====
Settlements were a type of rural locality that first appeared in Adygea during the Soviet times. Most were established by migrant peasants from outside of Adygea, although some also resulted from internal migration. Today, they are most common in the Belaya River valley near the foothills of the Caucasus Mountains.

As of 2014, there are fifty-three settlements in the republic, accounting for 23.3% of the republic's rural localities and for about 15% of its rural population. The population of a typical settlement is between one and two thousand, averaging 750. Although in existence for less than a century, the settlements' combined population is now almost equal to that of the khutors.

==== Stanitsas ====
Originally, stanitsas were fortified Russian Cossack outposts during the Caucasian War. After 1861, the stanitsas also started to appear in sparsely populated areas.

During Soviet times, stanitsas, no longer being Cossack settlements, still encompassed relatively large populations. In 1926, for example, the populations of five of the sixteen stanitsas then existing exceeded five thousand. As of 2014, there are twelve stanitsas in the republic, accounting for 5.3% of the republic's rural localities, but their combined population accounts for almost a quarter of the republic's rural population. They are fairly evenly spread across the republic's territory.

=== Numbers of rural localities by year ===
Year	Auls	Khutors	Selos	Settlements	Stanitsas	Total
1897	50	217	16	2	15	300
1926	50	283	15	1	15	369
1939	52	268	17	15	14	366
1959	46	183	21	99	12	361
1979	39	111	19	63	11	243
2002	40	100	20	50	12	222
2014	41	102	19	53	12	228
Sources: 1897–2002: 2014:

== Municipal division structure ==
Local government is established on the whole territory of the Republic of Adygea. The types of the municipal divisions are:

- municipal districts
- municipal urban okrugs
- municipal urban settlements
- municipal rural settlements

Upper-level municipal divisions in the republic are formed within the boundaries of existing administrative divisions, although this is not a requirement of federal law. Municipal districts are formed within the boundaries of the administrative districts, and municipal urban okrugs cover the territories of the cities/towns of the republican significance. Municipal urban settlements cover the territories of the urban-type settlements with adjacent rural localities, while municipal rural settlements cover the territories of groups of rural localities and largely correspond to the territories of former selsoviets.

== List of the administrative and municipal divisions ==
=== Republican urban okrugs ===
==== Maykopsky Republican Urban Okrug ====
Maykopsky Republican Urban Okrug includes the city of Maykop (Russian: Майкоп; Adyghe: Мыекъуапэ), which is located on the right bank of the Belaya River, and eight rural localities in its jurisdiction. Maykop serves as the capital of the republic and is bounded to the east and south by Maykopsky District, from which it is administratively and municipally separate; to the north it is bounded by Giaginsky District, and to the west by Belorechensky District of Krasnodar Krai. Its population in 2010 was recorded at 144,249.

As a municipal division, the republican urban okrug is incorporated as the Urban Okrug of the City of Maykop (городской округ "Город Майкоп").

==== Adygeysky Republican Urban Okrug ====
Adygeysky Republican Urban Okrug includes the town of Adygeysk (Russian: Адыгейск; Adyghe: Адыгэкъалэ), which is located near Krasnodar Reservoir, and two rural localities in its jurisdiction. Adygeysk is surrounded by Teuchezhsky District, although it is administratively and municipally separate from it. Its population in 2010 was recorded at 12,237.

As a municipal division, the republican urban okrug is incorporated as the Urban Okrug of the Town of Adygeysk (городской округ "Город Адыгейск").

=== Districts ===
==== Giaginsky District ====
Giaginsky District

Giaginsky District (Russian: Гиагинский район; Adyghe: Джэджэ район) lies in the central northern portion of the republic.

- Established on December 31, 1934
- Transferred to Adyghe Autonomous Oblast on April 10, 1936
- Administrative center is Giaginskaya, a stanitsa
- Population: 31,766

As a municipal division, the district is incorporated as Giaginsky Municipal District and is divided into five rural settlements comprising thirty rural localities.

==== Koshekhablsky District ====
Koshekhablsky District

Koshekhablsky District (Russian: Кошехабльский район; Adyghe: Кощхьэблэ район) lies in the eastern portion of the republic.

- Established on December 31, 1934; abolished on February 1, 1963; re-instated on January 12, 1965
- Administrative center is Koshekhabl, an aul
- Population: 30,422

As a municipal division, the district is incorporated as Koshekhablsky Municipal District and is divided into nine rural settlements comprising twenty-four rural localities.

==== Krasnogvardeysky District ====
Krasnogvardeysky District

Krasnogvardeysky District (Russian: Красногвардейский район; Adyghe: Красногвардейскэ район) occupies the northwestern portion of the republic.

- Established on February 7, 1929
- Administrative center is Krasnogvardeyskoye, a selo
- Population: 30,868

As a municipal division, the district is incorporated as Krasnogvardeysky Municipal District and is divided into seven rural settlements comprising twenty-five rural localities.

==== Maykopsky District ====
Maykopsky District

Maykopsky District (Russian: Майкопский район; Adyghe: Мыекъуапэ район) occupies the southern portion of the republic.

- Established on February 21, 1940; abolished on February 1, 1963; re-instated on January 12, 1965
- Administrative center is Tulsky, a settlement
- Population: 58,439

As a municipal division, the district is incorporated as Maykopsky Municipal District and is divided into ten rural settlements comprising fifty-seven rural localities.

==== Shovgenovsky District ====
Shovgenovsky District

Shovgenovsky District (Russian: Шовгеновский район; Adyghe: Шэуджэн район) lies in the central northern portion of the republic.

- Established on February 7, 1929; abolished on December 7, 1956; re-instated on March 21, 1958.
- Administrative center is Khakurinokhabl, an aul
- Population: 16,997

As a municipal division, the district is incorporated as Shovgenovsky Municipal District and is divided into six rural settlements comprising thirty-one rural localities.

==== Takhtamukaysky District ====
Takhtamukaysky District

Takhtamukaysky District (Russian: Тахтамукайский район; Adyghe: Тэхъутэмыкъуай район) occupies the westernmost portion of the republic. Between 1983 and 1990, it was known as Oktyabrsky District.

- Established on September 2, 1924; abolished on February 7, 1929; re-instated on December 31, 1934; abolished for the second time on February 1, 1963; re-instated for the second time on April 25, 1983
- Administrative center is Takhtamukay, an aul
- Population: 69,662

As a municipal division, the district is incorporated as Takhtamukaysky Municipal District and is divided into two urban settlements comprising two urban-type settlements (Enem and Yablonovsky; with six rural localities in their jurisdictions) and into five rural settlements comprising nineteen rural localities.

==== Teuchezhsky District ====
Teuchezhsky District

Teuchezhsky District (Russian: Теучежский район; Adyghe: Теуцожь район) lies in the western portion of the republic.

- Established on February 7, 1929; abolished on December 7, 1956; re-instated on August 5, 1957.
- Administrative center is Ponezhukay, an aul
- Population: 20,643

As a municipal division, the district is incorporated as Teuchezhsky Municipal District and is divided into one urban settlement comprising one urban-type settlement (Tlyustenkhabl; with one rural locality in its jurisdiction) and into six rural settlements comprising twenty-five rural localities.
