= Daut Nekhay =

Soviet soldier (1917–1955)

- Нэхай Ерэджыб ыкъо Даут (Adyghe); Даут Ереджибович Нехай (Russian)
- Born: 27 November 1917; Vochepshiy, Yekaterinodar Otdel, Kuban Oblast, Russian SFSR
- Died: 1 February 1955 (aged 37); Vochepshiy, Teuchezhsky District, Adyghe Autonomous Oblast, Krasnodar Krai, Russian SFSR, Soviet Union
- Military career
- Allegiance: Soviet Union
- Branch: Red Army (Infantry)
- Service years: 1939–1946
- Rank: Major
- Units: 1083rd Rifle Regiment; 312th Rifle Division; 69th Army
- Commands: Platoon, company, and rifle battalion
- Conflicts: World War II: Vistula–Oder offensive; Battle of Berlin
- Awards: Hero of the Soviet Union; Order of Lenin; Order of the Red Banner; Order of Alexander Nevsky; Order of the Patriotic War 2nd Class; Order of the Red Star; Foreign awards: Warsaw Medal 1939–1945 (Poland); Medal of Merit on the Field of Glory (Poland); Medal for the Oder, Neisse and Baltic (Poland)

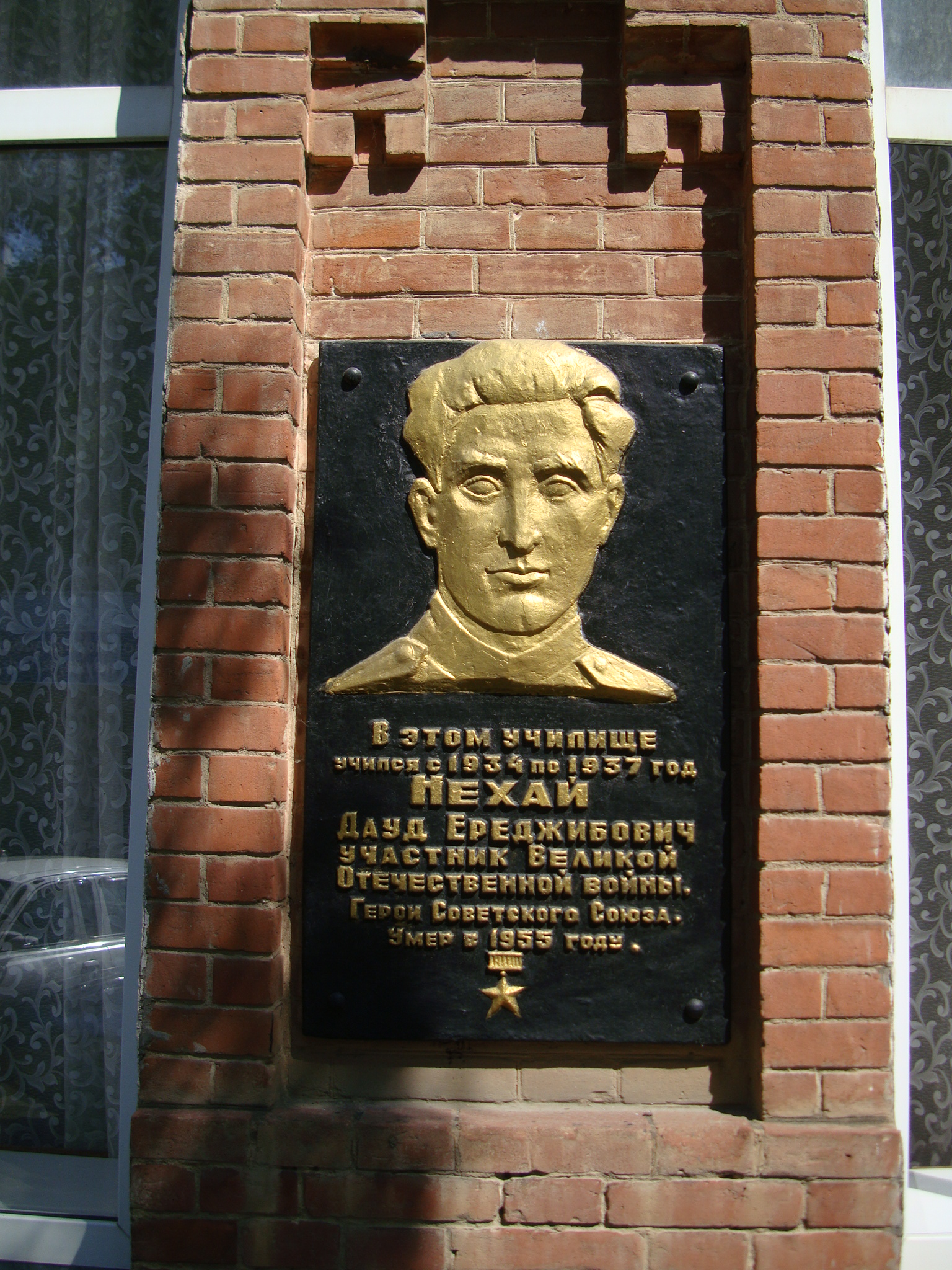
Daut Eredzhibovich Nekhay, Hero of the Soviet Union. Commemorative plaque on the Maykop Pedagogical College.

Daut Nekhay (Adyghe: Нэхай Ерэджыб ыкъо Даут, Russian: Даут Ереджибович Нехай; 27 November 1917 – 1 February 1955) was a Red Army major, commander of a battalion in the 1083rd Poznan Rifle Regiment of the 312th Smolensk Rifle Division (69th Army), and a Hero of the Soviet Union (1945).

== Biography ==
Daut Eredzhibovich Nekhay was born on 27 November 1917 in the aul of Vochepshiy in the Yekaterinodar Otdel of the Kuban Oblast (now in the Teuchezhsky District of the Republic of Adygea) to a peasant family. He was of Circassian ethnicity. In 1938, he graduated from the Adyghe Pedagogical School and worked as a teacher.

He joined the Red Army in 1939, drafted by the Ponezhukaysky District Military Commissariat in the Adyghe Autonomous Oblast, Krasnodar Krai. In 1941, he graduated from the Pukhovichi Military Infantry School.

Nekhay fought in World War II from 24 June 1941. He served as a platoon commander, company commander, senior adjutant of a rifle battalion, and rifle battalion commander across the Northern, Volkhov, Central, Bryansk, and 1st Belorussian fronts. He became a member of the Communist Party of the Soviet Union in 1942.

His combat record included:

- Battles on the Northern Front near the city of Kandalaksha in 1941;
- Engagements for Karelia and southwest of Belyov, Tula Oblast, in 1942;
- The Battle of Kursk, the liberation of Bolkhov, and settlements in the Bryansk Oblast in 1943;
- Crossing the Western Bug river, the liberation of Chełm, and the capture of the Puławy bridgehead on the Vistula river in 1944;
- The Vistula–Oder offensive, breaking through enemy defenses at the Puławy bridgehead, and the liberation of the cities of Radom, Łódź, and Poznań in 1945;
- The Battle of Berlin, including the fighting on the Seelow Heights, in 1945.

Throughout the war, he was wounded five times, returning to active duty each time.

== Heroism ==
On 14 January 1945, as the battalion commander of the 1083rd Rifle Regiment (312th Rifle Division, 69th Army, 1st Belorussian Front), Major Nekhay skillfully organized a breakthrough of enemy defenses on the western bank of the Vistula river near the village of Kuroszów on the Puławy bridgehead. Mounting his infantry on tanks, he pursued the enemy, captured the villages of Anielin and Klin by 11:00, and advanced up to 12 kilometers. During this action, his battalion killed up to 200 German soldiers, captured two heavy artillery batteries in their positions, seized 10 machine guns, and took 30 soldiers and officers prisoner. This contributed significantly to the successful fulfillment of the regiment's and division's objectives. He subsequently led his battalion with distinction during the liberation of the city of Poznań, Poland.

By a decree of the Presidium of the Supreme Soviet of the USSR on 27 February 1945, Major Daut Eredzhibovich Nekhay was awarded the title of Hero of the Soviet Union, along with the Order of Lenin and the "Gold Star" medal (No. 5221), for the exemplary execution of combat missions and the courage and heroism displayed in the fight against the German fascist invaders.

On 22 April 1945, Nekhay was severely wounded, resulting in the amputation of his leg.

After recovering in a hospital, Major Nekhay was placed in the reserve in 1946.

He returned to civilian life, working as a teacher and later as the director of the Pchegatlukay Secondary School in the Teuchezhsky District. He was elected as a deputy to the Krasnodar Krai Council of People's Deputies and served as a member of the Adyghe Regional Committee of the Communist Party.

He passed away on 1 February 1955.

== Memorials ==
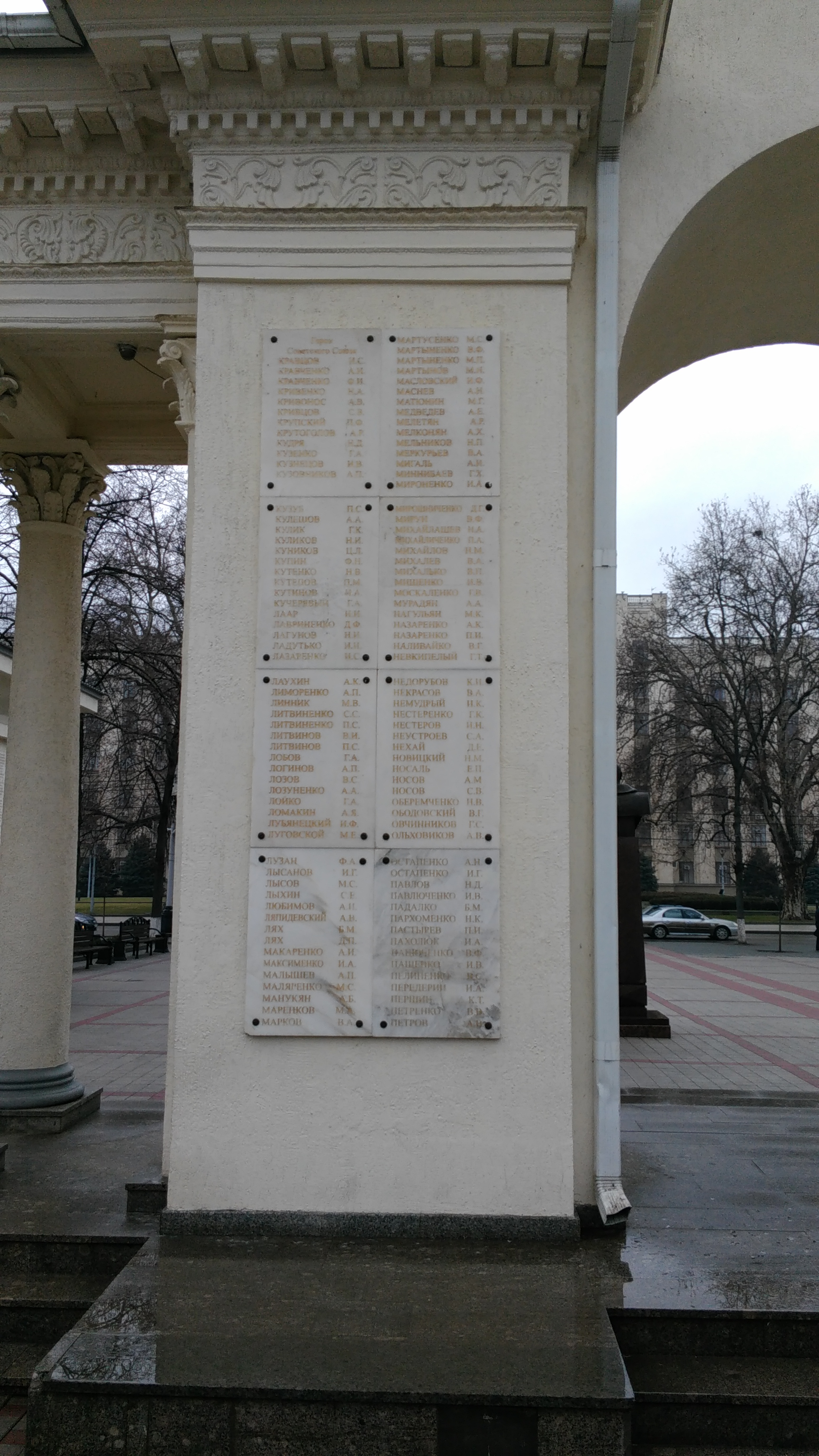
Memorial plaque to the Heroes of the Soviet Union in Krasnodar (2017)

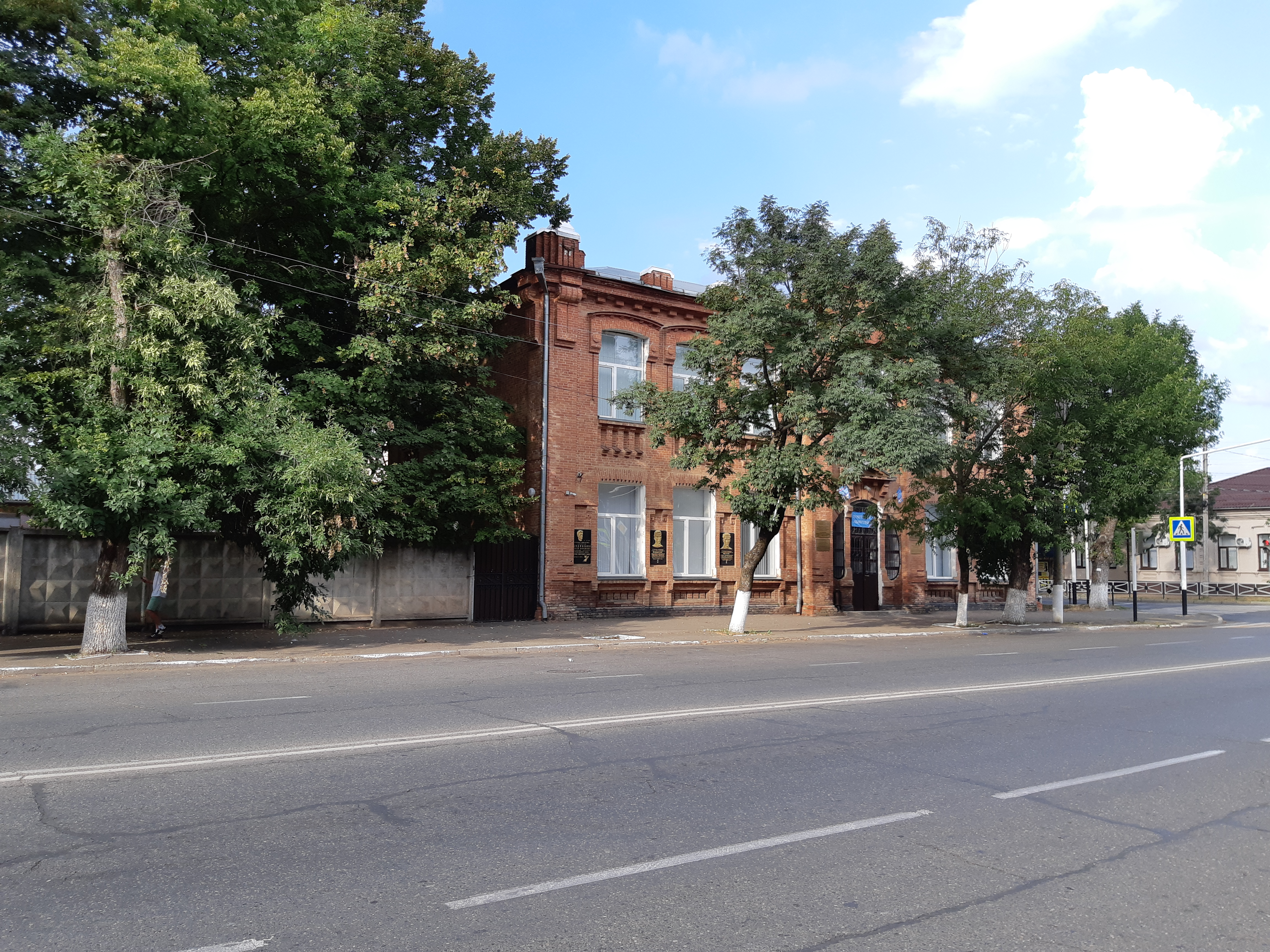
A commemorative plaque is installed on the pedagogical school building where the Hero studied

- He is buried in his native aul of Vochepshiy, where a monument has been erected in his honor.
- The Pchegatlukay Secondary School is named after him.
- Streets are named after him in Maykop, Adygeysk, Takhtamukay, Pchegatlukay, and Psekups.
- Commemorative plaques honoring him have been installed in the aul of Vochepshiy and on the building of the Khusen Andrukhaev Adyghe Pedagogical School in Maykop.

== Awards ==
Soviet Awards:

- Hero of the Soviet Union (27 February 1945, Medal No. 5221)
- Order of Lenin (27 February 1945)
- Order of the Red Banner (14 April 1945)
- Order of Alexander Nevsky (5 August 1944)
- Order of the Patriotic War 2nd class (1 August 1944)
- Order of the Red Star (21 August 1943)
- Medal "For the Victory over Germany in the Great Patriotic War 1941–1945"

Foreign Awards (Poland):

- Warsaw Medal 1939–1945
- Medal of Merit on the Field of Glory
- Medal for the Oder, Neisse and Baltic

== See also ==
- List of Heroes of the Soviet Union

== Bibliography ==
- Shkadov, Ivan (1988). Герои Советского Союза: Краткий биографический словарь [Heroes of the Soviet Union: A Brief Biographical Dictionary] (in Russian). Vol. 2. Moscow: Voenizdat. ISBN 5-203-00536-2.
- Sidzhakh, Khazretbiy (2005). Твои Герои, Адыгея: очерки о Героях Советского Союза [Your Heroes, Adygea: Essays on Heroes of the Soviet Union] (in Russian). Maykop: Adyghe Republican Book Publishing House. pp. 413. ISBN 5-7608-0459-6.
- Sidzhakh, Khazretbiy (2011). Герои России из Адыгеи [Heroes of Russia from Adygea] (in Russian). Maykop: Poligraf-Yug. pp. 116. ISBN 978-5-7992-0668-0.
