= Naberezhny =

Naberezhny (masculine), Naberezhnaya (feminine), or Naberezhnoye (neuter), Naberezhnye (plural) may refer to:

- Naberezhny, Republic of Adygea, a settlement in the Republic of Adygea, Russia
- Naberezhny, name of several other rural localities in Russia, including:
  - Naberezhny, Bizhbulyaksky District, Republic of Bashkortostan
  - Naberezhny, Karmaskalinsky District, Republic of Bashkortostan
  - Naberezhny, Perm Krai
- Naberezhnaya Tower, a skyscraper in Moscow, Russia
- Naberezhnoye, name of several rural localities in Russia
- Naberezhnye Chelny, a city in the Republic of Tatarstan, Russia
