= Kamchari Bzhigak =

Decorated Red Army officer

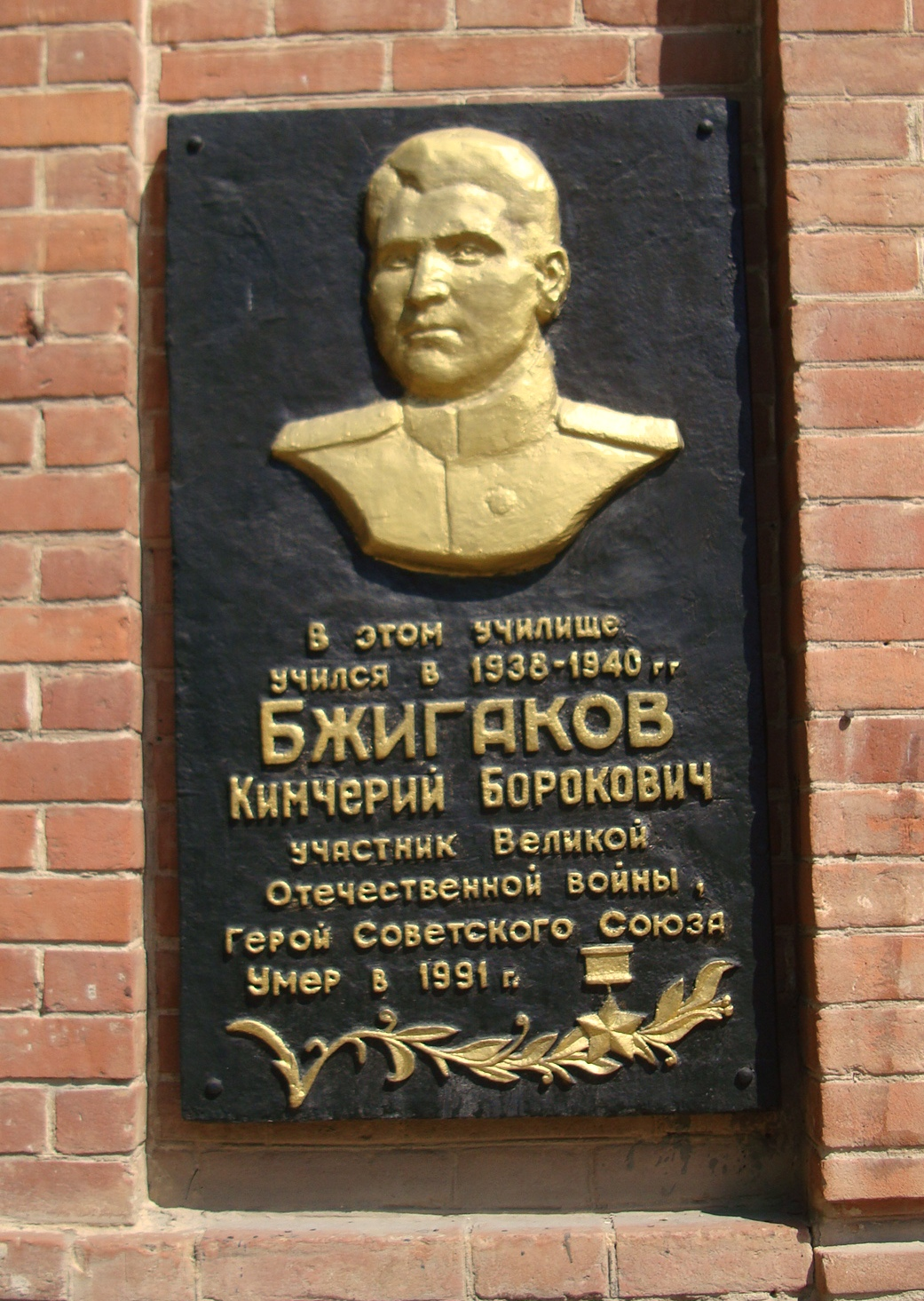
- Kamchari Barokovich Bzhigak, Hero of the Soviet Union. A commemorative plaque at the Maykop Pedagogical College.
- Born: 15 November 1919; Tlyustenkhabl, Teuchezhsky District, Adyghe Autonomous Oblast, Krasnodar Krai, Russian SFSR
- Died: 28 October 1991 (aged 71); Krasnodar, Krasnodar Krai, Russian SFSR, Soviet Union
- Military career
- Allegiance: Soviet Union
- Branch: Red Army (Artillery)
- Service years: 1940–1967
- Rank: Guards Senior lieutenant (later Colonel)
- Units: 7th Guards Cavalry Regiment; 2nd Guards Cavalry Division; 1st Guards Cavalry Corps
- Commands: Mortar battery platoon
- Conflicts: World War II: Battle of Moscow
- Awards: Hero of the Soviet Union; Order of Lenin; Order of the Red Banner; Order of the Patriotic War 1st class (twice); Order of the Patriotic War 2nd class; Order of the Red Star (three times)
- Other work: MVD officer

Kamchari Bzhigak (Adyghe: Бжыхьакъу Барэкъу ыкъо Къамчэрый; Russian: Камчари Барокович Бжигаков; 15 November 1919 – 28 October 1991) was a Red Army Guards senior lieutenant, commander of an 82-mm mortar platoon in the 7th Guards Peremyshl Cavalry Regiment of the 2nd Guards Cavalry Division (1st Guards Cavalry Corps, 1st Ukrainian Front), and a Hero of the Soviet Union.

== Biography ==
Kamchari Bzhigak was born on 15 November 1919 to a peasant family. He was of Circassian ethnicity. In 1938, he completed his incomplete secondary education in Krasnodar, and subsequently finished the first year of the Adyghe Pedagogical School.

He was drafted into the Red Army on 30 September 1940. He graduated from a regimental school on 22 June 1941, already at the front line. Throughout the war, he fought as a squad commander and later a mortar platoon commander on the Southern, Southwestern, Voronezh, and 1st Ukrainian fronts. In 1942, he completed junior lieutenant courses. Bzhigak took part in the defensive battles of 1941–1942, repelled enemy counterattacks on the Prut, and participated in fierce engagements for the cities of Kotovsk, Poltava, Romny, and in the Battle of Moscow. During offensive operations, he participated in the liberation of Kashira, Serpukhov, Venyov, Yukhnov, and other settlements.

In April 1945, as a Guards Senior Lieutenant commanding an 82-mm mortar platoon in the 7th Guards Cavalry Regiment (2nd Guards Cavalry Division, 1st Guards Cavalry Corps, 1st Ukrainian Front), Bzhigak participated in the crossing of the Elbe river and in the subsequent offensive battles near the city of Meissen in Germany. Using mortar fire, he repelled counterattacks from superior enemy forces, skillfully cut off the enemy infantry from their supporting tanks, suppressed five machine-gun nests, and killed approximately fifty enemy soldiers.

By a decree of the Presidium of the Supreme Soviet of the USSR on 27 June 1945, for the exemplary execution of combat missions and the courage and heroism displayed in the fight against the German fascist invaders, Kamchari Barokovich Bzhigak was awarded the title of Hero of the Soviet Union, along with the Order of Lenin and the "Gold Star" medal (No. 7911).

After the war, Bzhigak continued his service in the Soviet Armed Forces. In 1947, he graduated from the Officer Improvement Courses (KUOS), and in 1949, from the Vystrel courses. In 1967, he retired to the reserve with the rank of colonel. He lived in Krasnodar and worked in the agencies of the Ministry of Internal Affairs (MVD), actively participating in the patriotic education of the youth.

Kamchari Barokovich died on 28 October 1991 in Krasnodar. He is buried in his native aul of Tlyustenkhabl in the Teuchezhsky District (now in the Republic of Adygea).

== Awards ==
- Hero of the Soviet Union (27 June 1945)
- Order of Lenin (27 June 1945)
- Order of the Red Banner
- Order of the Patriotic War 1st class (twice: 22 May 1945; 1985)
- Order of the Patriotic War 2nd class (20 September 1944)
- Order of the Red Star (three times: 16 October 1943; 30 October 1944; post-war)
- Medal "For the Defence of Moscow" (1 May 1944)
- Medal "For the Victory over Germany in the Great Patriotic War 1941–1945" (9 May 1945)
- Jubilee Medal "In Commemoration of the 100th Anniversary of the Birth of Vladimir Ilyich Lenin"
- Jubilee Medal "Twenty Years of Victory in the Great Patriotic War 1941–1945" (7 May 1965)
- Jubilee Medal "Thirty Years of Victory in the Great Patriotic War 1941–1945"
- Jubilee Medal "Forty Years of Victory in the Great Patriotic War 1941–1945"
- Medal "Veteran of the Armed Forces of the USSR"
- Jubilee Medal "30 Years of the Soviet Army and Navy"
- Jubilee Medal "40 Years of the Armed Forces of the USSR"
- Medal "For Impeccable Service" 1st, 2nd, and 3rd classes
- Ministry of Defense of the USSR Badge "25 Years of Victory in the Great Patriotic War" (24 April 1970)
- "Guards" Badge

== Memorials ==
- His name is engraved in gold letters in the Hall of Glory at the Central Museum of the Great Patriotic War in Victory Park, Moscow.
- A memorial tombstone is erected at his grave.
- A commemorative plaque is installed on the building of the Adyghe Pedagogical School in Maykop.
- A street in the settlement of Tlyustenkhabl is named in his honor (formerly Adygeyskaya Street).

== See also ==
- List of Heroes of the Soviet Union

== Bibliography ==
- Shkadov, Ivan (1987). Герои Советского Союза: Краткий биографический словарь [Heroes of the Soviet Union: A Brief Biographical Dictionary] (in Russian). Vol. 1. Moscow: Voenizdat.
- Sidzhakh, Khazretbiy (2005). Твои Герои, Адыгея: очерки о Героях Советского Союза [Your Heroes, Adygea: Essays on Heroes of the Soviet Union] (in Russian). Maykop: Adyghe Republican Book Publishing House. pp. 416. ISBN 5-7608-0459-6.
- Золотые Звезды Адыгеи [Gold Stars of Adygea] (in Russian) (2nd ed.). Maykop. 1980. pp. 10–11.
- Кубани славные сыны [Glorious Sons of Kuban] (in Russian). Krasnodar. 1963. pp. 197–198.
