= Ulyap =

Ulyap Уляп Улап
- Aul
- Location within Republic of Adygea Location within European Russia Location within Russia
- Coordinates: 45°03′N 39°56′E
- Country: Russia
- Region: Adygea
- District: Krasnogvardeysky District
- Time zone: UTC+3:00

Ulyap (Russian: Уляп; Adyghe: Улап) is a rural locality (an aul) and the administrative center of Ulyapskoye Rural Settlement of Krasnogvardeysky District, Adygea, Russia. The population was 1,186 in 2018. There are 20 streets.

== Geography ==
Ulyap is located 33 km southeast of Krasnogvardeyskoye (the district's administrative centre) by road. Shturbino is the nearest rural locality.

== Ethnicity ==
The aul is inhabited by Adyghes.
