= Kochkin =

Kochkin may refer to:

- Dmitry Kochkin (born 1934), a former Soviet Nordic combined skier
- Kochkin, Pchegatlukayskoye Rural Settlement, Teuchezhsky District, Republic of Adygea, a village (khutor) in Pchegatlukayskoye Rural Settlement of Teuchezhsky District of the Republic of Adygea, Russia
- Kochkin, Ponezhukayskoye Rural Settlement, Teuchezhsky District, Republic of Adygea, a village (khutor) in Ponezhukayskoye Rural Settlement of Teuchezhsky District of the Republic of Adygea, Russia
