= Necherezy =

Necherezy Нечерезий Нэчэрэзый
- Aul
- Location within Republic of Adygea Location within Russia
- Coordinates: 44°55′N 39°23′E
- Country: Russia
- Region: Adygea
- District: Teuchezhsky District
- Time zone: UTC+3:00

Necherezy (Russian: Нечерезий; Adyghe: Нэчэрэзый) is a rural locality (an aul) in Ponezhukayskoye Rural Settlement of Teuchezhsky District, the Republic of Adygea, Russia. The population was 307 as of 2018. There are 3 streets.

== Geography ==
The aul is located in 5 km to the north of Ponezhukay aul.

== Ethnicity ==
The aul is inhabited by Circassians.
