= Neshukay =

Neshukay Нешукай Нэшъукъуай
- Aul
- Location within Republic of Adygea Location within Russia
- Coordinates: 44°54′N 39°25′E
- Country: Russia
- Region: Adygea
- District: Teuchezhsky District
- Time zone: UTC+3:00

Neshukay (Russian: Нешукай; Adyghe: Нэшъукъуай) is a rural locality (an aul) in Ponezhukayskoye Rural Settlement of Teuchezhsky District, the Republic of Adygea, Russia. The population was 911 as of 2018. There are 14 streets.

== Geography ==
The aul is on the left bank of the Marta River, 4 km northeast of Ponezhukay (the district's administrative centre) by road. Ponezhukay is the nearest rural locality.

== Ethnicity ==
The aul is inhabited by Russians and Adyghes.
