= Chabanov =

Chabanov Чабанов
- Khutor
- Location within Republic of Adygea Location within Russia
- Coordinates: 44°51′N 39°36′E
- Country: Russia
- Region: Adygea
- District: Teuchezhsky District
- Time zone: UTC+3:00

Chabanov (Russian: Чабанов) is a rural locality (a khutor) in Gabukayskoye Rural Settlement of Teuchezhsky District, the Republic of Adygea, Russia. The population was 35 as of 2018. There are 2 streets.

Chabanov is located 26 km east of Ponezhukay (the district's administrative centre) by road. Oktyabrskaya is the nearest rural locality.
