= Krasnoye, Republic of Adygea =

Krasnoye Красное
- Village
- Location within Republic of Adygea Location within Russia
- Coordinates: 44°52′N 39°27′E
- Country: Russia
- Region: Adygea
- District: Teuchezhsky District
- Time zone: UTC+3:00

Krasnoye (Russian: Красное) is a rural locality (a selo) in Assokolayskoye Rural Settlement of Teuchezhsky District, the Republic of Adygea, Russia. The population was 299 in 2018. There are eight streets.

== Geography ==
Krasnoye is located seven km east of Ponezhukay (the district's administrative centre) by road. Assokolay is the nearest rural locality.
