= Adamy, Russia =

Adamy Адамий (Russian) Адэмый (Adyghe)
- Aul
- Location within Republic of Adygea Location within Russia
- Coordinates: 45°04′N 39°29′E
- Country: Russia
- Region: Adygea
- District: Krasnogvardeysky District
- Founded: 1864

Population (2024)
  - Total: 1,314
- Time zone: UTC+3:00

Adamy (Russian: Адамий; Adyghe: Адэмый, romanized: Adəmıy) is a rural locality (an aul) in Krasnogvardeyskoye Rural Settlement of Krasnogvardeysky District, Adygea, Russia. The population was recorded in the 2021 Russian census as 1,338, but is estimated to be 1,314 as of 2024, a decrease from 1,340 in 2018. There are 28 streets.

== History ==
The village was founded in 1864 during the Circassian genocide by small remnants of the Ademey tribe, of whom the village is named after.

== Geography ==
The aul is located on the shore of the Krasnodar Reservoir of the Kuban River, near the mouth of the Belaya River, 12 km southwest of Krasnogvardeyskoye (the district's administrative centre) by road. Chumakov is the nearest rural locality.

== Demographics ==
The aul is inhabited by indigenous Circassians (Adyghes).
