= Novosevastopolskoye =

Novosevastopolskoye Новосевастопольское СевастополыкI
- Village
- Location within Republic of Adygea Location within Russia
- Coordinates: 45°03′N 39°42′E
- Country: Russia
- Region: Adygea
- District: Krasnogvardeysky District
- Time zone: UTC+3:00

Novosevastopolskoye (Russian: Новосевастопольское; Adyghe: СевастополыкI) is a rural locality (a selo) in Beloselskoye Rural Settlement of Krasnogvardeysky District, Adygea, Russia. The population was 834 as of 2018. There are 15 streets.

== Geography ==
Novosevastopolskoye is located 18 km southeast of Krasnogvardeyskoye (the district's administrative centre) by road. Bogursukov is the nearest rural locality.
