= Dzhambechiy =

Dzhambechiy Джамбечий Джамбэчый
- Aul
- Location within Republic of Adygea Location within Russia
- Coordinates: 45°05′N 39°51′E
- Country: Russia
- Region: Adygea
- District: Krasnogvardeysky District
- Time zone: UTC+3:00

Dzhambechiy (Russian: Джамбечий; Adyghe: Джамбэчый; Dzhambichi until 2018 (Russian: Джамбичи)) is a rural locality (an aul) in Bolshesidorovskoye Rural Settlement of Krasnogvardeysky District, Adygea, Russia. The population was 574 as of 2018. There are 15 streets.

== Geography ==
The aul is located 6 km north from Bolshesidorovskoye, on the left bank of the Laba River.

== Ethnicity ==
The aul is inhabited by Adyghes.
