= Chetuk =

Chetuk Четук
- Settlement
- Location within Republic of Adygea Location within Russia
- Coordinates: 44°52′N 39°09′E
- Country: Russia
- Region: Adygea
- District: Teuchezhsky District
- Time zone: UTC+3:00

Chetuk (Russian: Четук) is a rural locality (a settlement) in Pchegatlukayskoye Rural Settlement of Teuchezhsky District, the Republic of Adygea, Russia. The population was 465 as of 2018. There are 10 streets.

== Geography ==
Chetuk is located 24 km west of Ponezhukay (the district's administrative centre) by road. Krasnensky is the nearest rural locality.
