= Novovochepshy =

Novovochepshy Нововочепший
- Khutor
- Location within Republic of Adygea Location within Russia
- Coordinates: 44°54′N 39°16′E
- Country: Russia
- Region: Adygea
- District: Teuchezhsky District
- Time zone: UTC+3:00

Novovochepshy (Russian: Нововочепший) is a rural locality (a khutor) in Vochepshiyskoye Rural Settlement of Teuchezhsky District, the Republic of Adygea, Russia. The population was 169 as of 2018. There are 2 streets.

== Geography ==
Novovochepshy is located 10 km west of Ponezhukay (the district's administrative centre) by road. Vochepshy is the nearest rural locality.

== Ethnicity ==
The khutor is inhabited by Adighes.
