= Svobodny, Republic of Adygea =

Svobodny Свободный
- Settlement
- Location within Republic of Adygea Location within Russia
- Coordinates: 45°11′N 39°35′E
- Country: Russia
- Region: Adygea
- District: Krasnogvardeysky District
- Time zone: UTC+3:00

Svobodny (Russian: Свободный) is a rural locality (a settlement) in Khatukayskoye Rural Settlement of Krasnogvardeysky District, Adygea, Russia. The population was 8 as of 2018. There are 5 streets.

== Geography ==
Svobodny is located 6 km north of Krasnogvardeyskoye (the district's administrative centre) by road. Vodny is the nearest rural locality.
