= Kazazov =

Kazazov Казазов
- Khutor
- Location within Republic of Adygea Location within Russia
- Coordinates: 44°54′N 39°10′E
- Country: Russia
- Region: Adygea
- District: Teuchezhsky District
- Time zone: UTC+3:00

Kazazov (Russian: Казазов) is a rural locality (a khutor) in Pchegatlukayskoye Rural Settlement of Teuchezhsky District, the Republic of Adygea, Russia. The population was 274 as of 2018. There are 13 streets.

== Geography ==
Kazazov is located 18 km west of Ponezhukay (the district's administrative centre) by road. Adygeysk is the nearest rural locality.
