= Yelenovskoye =

Yelenovskoye Еленовское Еленовскэр
- Village
- Location within Republic of Adygea Location within Russia
- Coordinates: 45°05′N 39°43′E
- Country: Russia
- Region: Adygea
- District: Krasnogvardeysky District
- Time zone: UTC+3:00

Yelenovskoye (Russian: Еленовское; Adyghe: Еленовскэр) is a rural locality (a selo) and the administrative center of Yelenovskoye Rural Settlement of Krasnogvardeysky District, Adygea, Russia. The population was 2693 as of 2018. There are 48 streets.

== Geography ==
Yelenovskoye is located 12 km southeast of Krasnogvardeyskoye (the district's administrative centre) by road. Saratovsky is the nearest rural locality.

== Ethnicity ==
The village is inhabited by Russians (66.5%) and Kurds (25.1%) according to the 2010 census.
