= Dzhidzhikhabl =

Dzhidzhikhabl Джиджихабль Джэджэхьабл
- Aul
- Location within Republic of Adygea Location within Russia
- Coordinates: 44°56′N 39°24′E
- Country: Russia
- Region: Adygea
- District: Teuchezhsky District
- Time zone: UTC+3:00

Dzhidzhikhabl (Russian: Джиджихабль; Adyghe: Джэджэхьабл) is a rural locality (an aul) and the administrative center of Dzhidzhikhablskoye Rural Settlement of Teuchezhsky District, the Republic of Adygea, Russia. The population was 754 as of 2018. There are 8 streets.

== Geography ==
The aul is on the shore of the Gulf of Krasnodar Reservoir, 10 km north of Ponezhukay (the district's administrative centre) by road. Tauykhabl is the nearest rural locality.

== Ethnicity ==
The aul is inhabited by Circassians.
