= Shunduk =

Shunduk may refer to:

- Shunduk River, a river in the Republic of Adygea, Russia
- Shunduk (village), a village (khutor) in the Republic of Adygea, Russia
