= Verkhnenazarovskoye =

Verkhnenazarovskoye Верхненазаровское Ышъхьагърэ Назаров
- Village
- Location within Republic of Adygea Location within Russia
- Coordinates: 45°00′N 39°45′E
- Country: Russia
- Region: Adygea
- District: Krasnogvardeysky District
- Time zone: UTC+3:00

Verkhnenazarovskoye (Russian: Верхненазаровское; Adyghe: Ышъхьагърэ Назаров) is a rural locality (a selo) in Sadovskoye Rural Settlement of Krasnogvardeysky District, Adygea, Russia. The population was 581 as of 2018. There are 7 streets.

== Geography ==
Verkhnenazarovskoye is located 25 km southeast of Krasnogvardeyskoye (the district's administrative centre) by road. Sadovoye is the nearest rural locality.

== Ethnicity ==
The selo is inhabited by Kurds (59.4%) and Russians (34.2%) according to the 2010 census.
