= Mirny, Krasnogvardeysky District, Republic of Adygea =

Mirny Мирный Мамырныгъ
- Settlement
- Location within Republic of Adygea Location within Russia
- Coordinates: 45°03′N 39°34′E
- Country: Russia
- Region: Adygea
- District: Krasnogvardeysky District
- Time zone: UTC+3:00

Mirny (Russian: Мирный; Adyghe: Мамырныгъ) is a rural locality (a settlement) in Beloselskoye Rural Settlement of Krasnogvardeysky District, Adygea, Russia. The population was 10 as of 2018. There are 2 streets.

== Geography ==
Mirny is located 12 km south of Krasnogvardeyskoye (the district's administrative centre) by road. Papenkov is the nearest rural locality.
