= Bzhedugkhabl =

Bzhedugkhabl Бжедугхабль Бжъэдыгъухьабл
- Aul
- Location within Republic of Adygea Location within Russia
- Coordinates: 44°58′N 39°42′E
- Country: Russia
- Region: Adygea
- District: Krasnogvardeysky District
- Time zone: UTC+3:00

Bzhedugkhabl (Russian: Бжедугхабль; Adyghe: Бжъэдыгъухьабл) is a rural locality (an aul) in Sadovskoye Rural Settlement of Krasnogvardeysky District, Adygea, Russia. The population was 1041 as of 2018. There are 16 streets.

== Geography ==
Bzhedugkhabl is located 26 km southeast of Krasnogvardeyskoye (the district's administrative centre) by road. Sadovoye is the nearest rural locality.

== Ethnicity ==
The aul is inhabited by Kurds (42.6%), Russians (38.1%) and Armenians (7.2%) according to the 2010 census.
