= Pchegatlukay =

Pchegatlukay Пчегатлукай Пчыхьалӏыкъуай
- Aul
- Location within Republic of Adygea Location within Russia
- Coordinates: 44°53′N 39°15′E
- Country: Russia
- Region: Adygea
- District: Teuchezhsky District
- Time zone: UTC+3:00

Pchegatlukay (Russian: Пчегатлукай; Adyghe: Пчыхьалӏыкъуай) is a rural locality (an aul) and the administrative center of Pchegatlukayskoye Rural Settlement of Teuchezhsky District, the Republic of Adygea, Russia. The population was 869 as of 2018. There are 21 streets.

== Geography ==
The aul is located on the left bank of the Psekups River, 14 km west of Ponezhukay (the district's administrative centre) by road. Neshukay is the nearest rural locality.

== Ethnicity ==
The aul is inhabited by Circassians.
