= Khatukai =

Khatukai may refer to:

- Hatuqwai, a western Circassian tribal princedom
- Khatukay, a village (aul) in the Republic of Adygea, Russia
