= Preobrazhenskoye, Republic of Adygea =

Preobrazhenskoye Преображенское Цуукӏэй
- Village
- Location within Republic of Adygea Location within Russia
- Coordinates: 45°05′N 39°37′E
- Country: Russia
- Region: Adygea
- District: Krasnogvardeysky District
- Time zone: UTC+3:00

Preobrazhenskoye (Russian: Преображенское; Adyghe: Цуукӏэй) is a rural locality (a selo) in Beloselskoye Rural Settlement of Krasnogvardeysky District, Adygea, Russia. The population was 1469 as of 2018. There are 19 streets.

== Geography ==
Preobrazhenskoye is located 10 km south of Krasnogvardeyskoye (the district's administrative centre) by road. Beloye is the nearest rural locality.

== Ethnicity ==
The village is inhabited by Kurds (66.2%) and Russians (31.1%) according to the 2010 census.
