= Assokolay =

Assokolay Ассоколай Аскъэлай
- Village
- Location within Republic of Adygea Location within Russia
- Coordinates: 44°50′42″N 39°28′04″E
- Country: Russia
- Region: Adygea
- District: Teuchezhsky District
- Time zone: UTC+3:00

Assokolay (Russian: Ассоколай; Adyghe: Аскъэлай) is a rural locality (an aul) in Teuchezhsky District of the Republic of Adygea, Russia. It is located southeast of Ponezhukay and has mostly Adyghe population.
