= Shturbino =

Shturbino Штурбино Штурбинэ
- Village
- Location within Republic of Adygea Location within Russia
- Coordinates: 45°03′N 39°54′E
- Country: Russia
- Region: Adygea
- District: Krasnogvardeysky District
- Time zone: UTC+3:00

Shturbino (Russian: Штурбино; Adyghe: Штурбинэ) is a rural locality (a selo) in Ulyapskoye Rural Settlement of Krasnogvardeysky District, Adygea, Russia. The population was 491 as of 2018. There are 11 streets.

== Geography ==
Shturbino is located 28 km southeast of Krasnogvardeyskoye (the district's administrative centre) by road. Ulyap is the nearest rural locality.
