= Kunchukokhabl =

Kunchukokhabl Кунчукохабль Къунчыкъохьабл
- Aul
- Location within Republic of Adygea Location within Russia
- Coordinates: 44°58′N 39°28′E
- Country: Russia
- Region: Adygea
- District: Teuchezhsky District
- Time zone: UTC+3:00

Kunchukokhabl (Russian: Кунчукохабль; Adyghe: Къунчыкъохьабл) is a rural locality (an aul) in Dzhidzhikhablskoye Rural Settlement of Teuchezhsky District, the Republic of Adygea, Russia. The population was 519 as of 2018. There are 10 streets.

== Geography ==
The aul is on the shore of the Gulf of Krasnodar reservoir, 19 km northeast of Ponezhukay (the district's administrative centre) by road. Gorodskoy is the nearest rural locality.

== Ethnicity ==
The aul is inhabited by Circassians.
