= Shevchenko (khutor) =

Shevchenko Шевченко
- Khutor
- Location within Republic of Adygea Location within Russia
- Coordinates: 44°53′N 39°31′E
- Country: Russia
- Region: Adygea
- District: Teuchezhsky District
- Time zone: UTC+3:00

Shevchenko (Russian: Шевченко) is a rural locality (a khutor) in Gabukayskoye Rural Settlement of Teuchezhsky District, the Republic of Adygea, Russia. The population was 649 as of 2018. There are 9 streets.

== Geography ==
Shevchenko is located 13 km east of Ponezhukay (the district's administrative centre) by road. Petrov is the nearest rural locality.
