= Krasnensky (rural locality) =

Krasnensky (Russian: Кра́сненский; masculine), Krasnenskaya (Кра́сненская; feminine), or Krasnenskoye (Кра́сненское; neuter) is the name of several rural localities in Russia:

- Krasnensky, Republic of Adygea, a khutor in Teuchezhsky District of the Republic of Adygea
- Krasnensky, Kaluga Oblast, a settlement in Khvastovichsky District of Kaluga Oblast

== See also ==
- Krasninsky (rural locality)
