= Petrov (khutor) =

Petrov Петров
- Khutor
- Location within Republic of Adygea Location within Russia
- Coordinates: 44°55′N 39°30′E
- Country: Russia
- Region: Adygea
- District: Teuchezhsky District
- Time zone: UTC+3:00

Petrov (Russian: Петров) is a rural locality (a khutor) in Gabukayskoye Rural Settlement of Teuchezhsky District, the Republic of Adygea, Russia. The population was 283 as of 2018. There are 4 streets.

== Geography ==
Petrov is located 17 km northeast of Ponezhukay (the district's administrative centre) by road. Shevchenko is the nearest rural locality.
