= Bogursukov =

Bogursukov Богурсуков Быгъарсыкъу
- Khutor
- Location within Republic of Adygea Location within Russia
- Coordinates: 45°02′N 39°42′E
- Country: Russia
- Region: Adygea
- District: Krasnogvardeysky District
- Time zone: UTC+3:00

Bogursukov (Russian: Богурсуков; Adyghe: Быгъарсыкъу) is a rural locality (a khutor) in Beloselskoye Rural Settlement of Krasnogvardeysky District, Adygea, Russia. The population was 182 as of 2018. There are 3 streets.

== Geography ==
Bogursukov is located 19 km southeast of Krasnogvardeyskoye (the district's administrative centre) by road. Novosevastopolskoye is the nearest rural locality.
