= Krasnensky =

Krasnensky (masculine), Krasnenskaya (feminine), or Krasnenskoye (neuter) may refer to:

- Krasnensky District, a district of Belgorod Oblast, Russia
- Krasnensky (rural locality) (Krasnenskaya, Krasnenskoye), name of several rural localities in Russia
