= Doguzhiyev =

Doguzhiyev Догужиев Дэгужъый
- Khutor
- Location within Republic of Adygea Location within Russia
- Coordinates: 45°07′N 39°45′E
- Country: Russia
- Region: Adygea
- District: Krasnogvardeysky District
- Time zone: UTC+3:00

Doguzhiyev (Russian: Догужиев; Adyghe: Дэгужъый) is a rural locality (a khutor) in Yelenovskoye Rural Settlement of Krasnogvardeysky District, Adygea, Russia. The population was 10 as of 2018. There are 4 streets.

== Geography ==
Doguzhiyev is located 19 km east of Krasnogvardeyskoye (the district's administrative centre) by road. Nekrasovskaya is the nearest rural locality.
