= Gorodskoy =

Gorodskoy Городской
- Khutor
- Location within Republic of Adygea Location within Russia
- Coordinates: 44°59′N 39°26′E
- Country: Russia
- Region: Adygea
- District: Teuchezhsky District
- Time zone: UTC+3:00

Gorodskoy (Russian: Городской) is a rural locality (a khutor) in Dzhidzhikhablskoye Rural Settlement of Teuchezhsky District, the Republic of Adygea, Russia. The population was 297 as of 2018. There are 7 streets.

== Geography ==
Gorodskoy is located 16 km north of Ponezhukay (the district's administrative centre) by road. Kunchukokhabl is the nearest rural locality.

== Ethnicity ==
The khutor is inhabited by Russians, Ukrainians and Adygheans.
