= Tauykhabl =

Tauykhabl Тауйхабль Тэуехьабл
- Aul
- Location within Republic of Adygea Location within Russia
- Coordinates: 44°57′N 39°22′E
- Country: Russia
- Region: Adygea
- District: Teuchezhsky District
- Time zone: UTC+3:00

Tauykhabl (Russian: Тауйхабль; Adyghe: Тэуехьабл) is a rural locality (an aul) in Dzhidzhikhablskoye Rural Settlement of Teuchezhsky District, the Republic of Adygea, Russia. The population was 197 as of 2018. There are 5 streets.

== Geography ==
Tauykhabl is located 14 km north of Ponezhukay (the district's administrative centre) by road. Dzhidzhikhabl is the nearest rural locality.
