= Beloye, Adygea =

Beloye Белое Бгъошэхьабл
- Village
- Location within Republic of Adygea Location within Russia
- Coordinates: 45°02′N 39°39′E
- Country: Russia
- Region: Adygea
- District: Krasnogvardeysky District
- Time zone: UTC+3:00

Beloye (Russian: Белое; Adyghe: Бгъошэхьабл) is a rural locality (a selo) and the administrative center of Beloselskoye Rural Settlement of Krasnogvardeysky District, Adygea, Russia. The population was 3088 as of 2018. There are 31 streets.

== Geography ==
The village is located on the right bank of the Belaya, 14 km southeast of Krasnogvardeyskoye (the district's administrative centre) by road. Preobrazhenskoye is the nearest rural locality.

== Ethnicity ==
The village is inhabited by Russians (56.1%) and Kurds (35.2%) according to the 2010 census.
