= Pshikuykhabl =

Pshikuykhabl Пшикуйхабль Пщыкъуйхьабл
- Aul
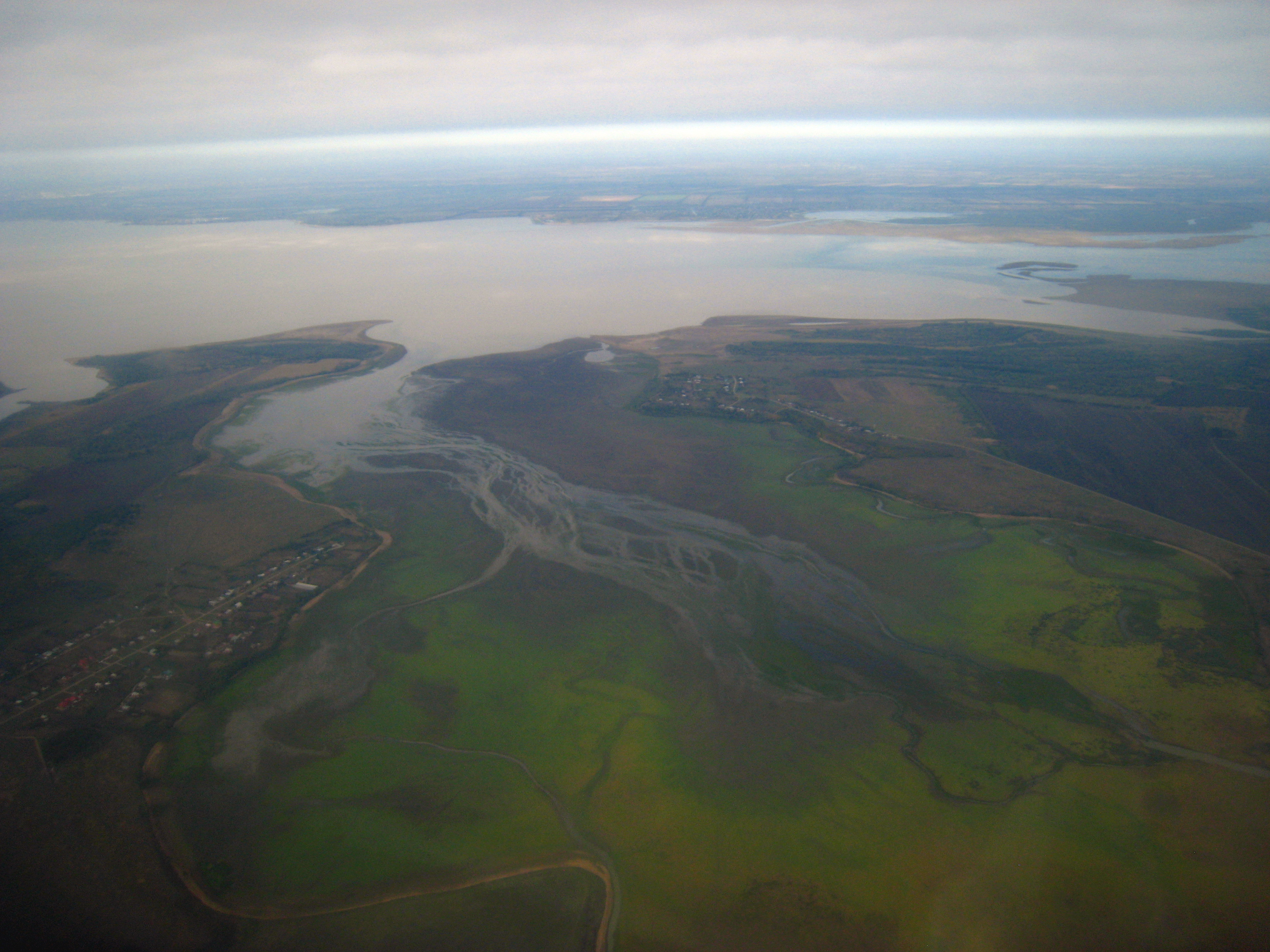
- Aerial view of Pshikuykhabl (left)

- Location within Republic of Adygea Location within Russia
- Coordinates: 44°56′N 39°22′E
- Country: Russia
- Region: Adygea
- District: Teuchezhsky District
- Time zone: UTC+3:00

Pshikuykhabl (Russian: Пшикуйхабль; Adyghe: Пщыкъуйхьабл) is a rural locality (an aul) in Ponezhukhayskoye Rural Settlement of Teuchezhsky District, the Republic of Adygea, Russia. The population was 275 as of 2018. There are 6 streets.

== Geography ==
The aul is located on the shore of the Krasnodar Reservoir of the Kuban River, 7 km north of Ponezhukay (the district's administrative centre) by road. Nacherezy is the nearest rural locality.

== Ethnicity ==
The aul is inhabited by Adyghes.
