= Kolos, Republic of Adygea =

Kolos Колос
- Khutor
- Location within Republic of Adygea Location within Russia
- Coordinates: 44°55′N 39°24′E
- Country: Russia
- Region: Adygea
- District: Teuchezhsky District
- Time zone: UTC+3:00

Kolos (Russian: Ко́лос) is a rural locality (a khutor) in Teuchezhsky District of the Republic of Adygea, Russia.
