= Vochepshiy =

Rural locality in Teuchezhsky District, Russia

Coordinates: 44°52′N 39°17′E

Vochepshiy (Adyghe: Очэпщый; Russian: Вочепший, romanized: Vočepšij) is a rural locality (an aul) in the district of Teuchezhsky (Adyghe: Теуцожь Район) in the Republic of Adygea, Russia.

Vochepshiy is located on the Psekups River which flows into the Kuban's drainage basin near Krasnodar Reservoir, 95 kilometers (59 mi) north of Maykop, 14 kilometers (8.7 mi) to the east of Adygeysk, and about 30 kilometers (19 mi) from Krasnodar International Airport.

Vochepshiy is an Adyghe village and the residents are from different Adyghe families, specially the Pshedatok (Adyghe: Пщыдатыкъу), Kosho (Adyghe: Кушу), and Nakai (Adyghe: Нэхая) families.
