= Saratovsky, Republic of Adygea =

Khutor in Adygea, Russia

Saratovsky Саратовский Байкъан
- Khutor
- Location within Republic of Adygea Location within Russia
- Coordinates: 45°05′N 39°45′E
- Country: Russia
- Region: Adygea
- District: Koshekhablsky District

Population (2018)
  - Total: 480
- Time zone: UTC+3:00

Saratovsky (Russian: Саратовский; Adyghe: Байкъан) is a rural locality (a khutor) in Yelenovskoye Rural Settlement of Koshekhablsky District, Adygea, Russia. The population was 480 as of 2018. There are 30 streets.

== Geography ==
Saratovsky is located 16 km southeast of Krasnogvardeyskoye (the district's administrative centre) by road. Yelenovskoye is the nearest rural locality.
