= Krasninsky (rural locality) =

One of several places in Russia

Krasninsky (Russian: Кра́снинский; masculine), Krasninskaya (Кра́снинская; feminine), or Krasninskoye (Кра́снинское; neuter) is the name of several rural localities in Russia:

- Krasninsky, Chelyabinsk Oblast, a settlement in Krasninsky Selsoviet of Verkhneuralsky District of Chelyabinsk Oblast
- Krasninsky, Lipetsk Oblast, a settlement in Alexandrovsky Selsoviet of Krasninsky District of Lipetsk Oblast
- Krasninskoye, a selo in Pushkinskaya Rural Territory of Prokopyevsky District of Kemerovo Oblast

== See also ==
- Krasnensky (rural locality)
