= Ademey =

Extinct Circassian tribe

The Adameys or Adamians (Adyghe: Адэмый, romanized: Adəmıy) were a Circassian tribe who were massacred in the Circassian genocide. Today, they are assimilated into the Chemguy tribe and reduced to a small family in the village of Adamy.

== History ==
The Adameys were first mentioned in 1667 in the reports of the Turkish traveler Evliya Çelebi, who reported:

"Adamey... Having crossed the Khyr-Karokh mountains, we crossed the rivers Sup, Edi-Kyutuk and Psekups. "Pshuko" Adameys are located at the foot of the Abkhaz mountains on the bank of the river Kyzlar-algan (Psekups) and has 500 houses. The leader of the Adamey tribe lives here, his name is Diguzi-Bey. All of them - noble and well-born - are sayyids from hereditary Circassians..."

According to Evliya Çelebi's report, this is how the tribe adopted its name:

"In the rocks to the south of the giant sacred tree of the Adameys, there are a number of huge caves. From one cave flows a river, which must be crossed to come to the main cave. In this cave, there is a bronze statue of a human. The bronze man holds a bronze club in his hand. Behind the bronze man, there is a door leading to countless treasures. Only those who do not touch the valuables can leave the cave alive. The Circassian tribe living in this area is called Adamey after the name of that bronze man. According to the legend, the treasury in the cave was built by Dhu al-Qarnayn."

— Evliya Çelebi

Semyon Mikhailovich Bronevsky wrote in his 1823 description:

"Adamey is a small tribe, lives further to the east and includes several villages located along the Shag-Vasu river and the rivers Pshaga and Pshish, adjacent to the Temirgoys and depending on them..."

The majority of Ademeys were destroyed in the Circassian genocide. The survivors were first exiled to the Balkans in 1864 (see Circassians in Bulgaria), and later settled in Turkey where they assimilated into other tribes or Turks.

== Notable personalities ==
- Sultan Khan-Giray
