= Khatukay =

Khatukay Хатукай Хьатикъуай
- Aul
- Location within Republic of Adygea Location within Russia
- Coordinates: 45°11′N 39°39′E
- Country: Russia
- Region: Adygea
- District: Krasnogvardeysky District
- Time zone: UTC+3:00

Khatukay (Russian: Хатукай; Adyghe: Хьатикъуай) is a rural locality (an aul) in Khatukayskoye Rural Settlement of Krasnogvardeysky District, Adygea, Russia. The region was originally the homeland of the Hatuqwai Circassians, but none were left in the region after the Circassian genocide. The population was 5038 as of 2018. There are 59 streets.

== Geography ==
Khatukay is located 9 km northeast of Krasnogvardeyskoye (the district's administrative centre) by road. Ust-Labinsk is the nearest rural locality.
