= Chumakov (village) =

Chumakov Чумаков
- Khutor
- Location within Republic of Adygea Location within Russia
- Coordinates: 45°03′N 39°30′E
- Country: Russia
- Region: Adygea
- District: Koshekhablsky District

Population (2018)
  - Total: 78
- Time zone: UTC+3:00

Chumakov (Russian: Чумаков) is a rural locality (a khutor) in Krasnogvardeyskoye Rural Settlement of Koshekhablsky District, Adygea, Russia. The population was 78 as of 2018. There is 1 street.

== Geography ==
The khutor is located on the right bank of the Belaya River, 14 km southwest of Krasnogvardeyskoye (the district's administrative centre) by road. Adamy is the nearest rural locality.
