= Krasnensky, Republic of Adygea =

Krasnensky Красненский
- Khutor
- Location within Republic of Adygea Location within Russia
- Coordinates: 44°51′N 39°10′E
- Country: Russia
- Region: Adygea
- District: Teuchezhsky District
- Time zone: UTC+3:00

Krasnensky (Russian: Красненский) is a rural locality (a khutor) in Pchegatlukayskoye Rural Settlement of Teuchezhsky District, the Republic of Adygea, Russia. The population was 383 as of 2018. There are 9 streets.

== Geography ==
Krasnensky is located 29 km west of Ponezhukay (the district's administrative centre) by road. Kochkin is the nearest rural locality.
