= Shunduk (village) =

Shunduk Шундук
- Khutor
- Location within Republic of Adygea Location within Russia
- Coordinates: 44°55′N 39°20′E
- Country: Russia
- Region: Adygea
- District: Teuchezhsky District
- Time zone: UTC+3:00

Shunduk (Russian: Шундук) is a rural locality (a khutor) in Ponezhukayskoye Rural Settlement of Teuchezhsky District, the Republic of Adygea, Russia. The population was 17 as of 2018. There is 1 street.

== Geography ==
The khutor is located on the right bank of the Shunduk river, 8 km northwest of Ponezhukay (the district's administrative centre) by road. Pshikuykhabl is the nearest rural locality.
