= Tlyustenkhabl =

Tlyustenkhabl Тлюстенхабль
- Urban-type settlement

Other transcription(s)
  - Adyghe: Лъэустэнхьабл
- Interactive map of Tlyustenkhabl
- Location of Tlyustenkhabl Tlyustenkhabl (Republic of Adygea)
- Coordinates: 44°59′N 39°06′E
- Country: Russia
- Federal subject: Adygea
- Administrative district: Teuchezhsky District
- Founded: 1840
- Elevation: 21 m (69 ft)

Population (2010 Census)
  - Total: 5,403
  - Estimate (2025): 7,209 (+33.4%)

Municipal status
  - Municipal district: Teuchezhsky Municipal District
  - Urban settlement: Tlyustenkhablskoye Urban Settlement
  - Capital of: Tlyustenkhablskoye Urban Settlement
- Time zone: UTC+3 (MSK)
- Postal code: 385228
- OKTMO ID: 79633155051

Tlyustenkhabl population
- 2010 Census: 5,403
- 2002 Census: 4,961
- 1989 Census: 3,869
- 1979 Census: 4,137

Tlyustenkhabl (Russian: Тлюстенха́бль; Adyghe: Лъэустэнхьабл) is an urban locality (an urban-type settlement) in Teuchezhsky District of the Republic of Adygea, Russia, located on the left bank of the Kuban River opposite of Krasnodar in Krasnodar Krai, on the shores of Krasnodar Reservoir, 114 kilometers (71 mi) northwest of Maykop, the capital of the republic. As of the 2010 Census, its population was 5,403.

== Administrative and municipal status ==
Within the framework of administrative divisions, the urban-type settlement of Tlyustenkhabl is subordinated to Teuchezhsky District. As a municipal division, Tlyustenkhabl, together with one rural locality (the aul of Tugurgoy), is incorporated within Teuchezhsky Municipal District as Tlyustenkhablskoye Urban Settlement.

== Sultan Khan-Giray ==
In 1990s a memorial to Circassian ethnographer and writer Sultan Khan-Giray who was born and died there was erected in Tlyustenkhabl.
