= Sultan Khan-Giray =

Circassian politician, ethnographer and author (1808–1842)

- Born: 1808; Tləwstənhabl, Circassia
- Died: 1842 (aged 33–34); Tləwstənhabl, Circassia
- Occupations: aristocrat, ethnographer, folklorist and art critic
- Spouse: Tukay
- Children: Murad-Giray

Sultan Khan-Giray (full name: Kırım-Giray Mehmet Gireyev Khan-Giray; 1808–1842) was a Circassian politician and representative of the Circassian aristocracy, ethnographer, folklorist, art critic, author (of works that have contributed significantly to Circassian culture and Circassian literature). He is considered one of the founders of Circassian ethnography and historical science.

== Biography ==
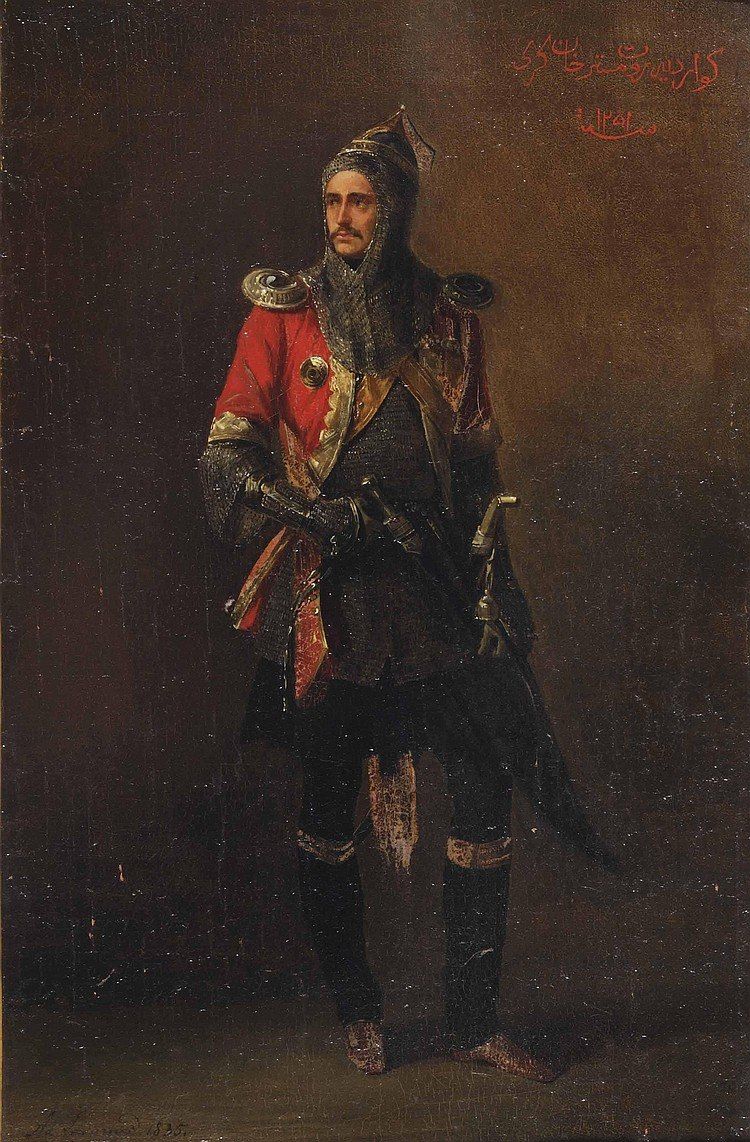
Sultan Khan-Giray

He was born in 1808 in the village of Tləwstənhabl in Circassia (now in the Republic of Adygea) as a member of the Adamey tribe. He graduated from the Cadet Corps in St. Petersburg, served in various officer ranks. He supported the peaceful annexation of Circassia to Russia.

His works, used by researchers in Russia and abroad, has been published in well-known periodicals in St. Petersburg, Moscow and the Caucasus. In addition to the above, some famous literary works are still sought after. Some of the works have been studied by the researchers of the Adygea Republic Humanitarian Research Institute.

In 2008, an evening dedicated to Sultan Khan-Girey's 200th birthday was held at the Pyatigorsk National House of Cultures.

== Memorial ==
In 1990s a memorial to him was erected in Tlyustenkhabl (Tləwstənhabl), where he was born and deceased.

== Works ==
- Historical and ethnographic composition "Notes on Circassia". 1836 g.
- The story of "Circassian legends" (Russian Bulletin. 1841. T. 2).
- Moral descriptive essay "Beliefs, manners, traditions, lifestyle of Circassians" (lc. 1842. T. 5.).
- The story of "Prince Kanbulat" (lc. 1844. No. 10-11).
- Fairy tale "Zoom Kunchuka" (Kafkasya 1846;. Perepech tana, "Russian Invalid", 1846 g :, II. Collection newspaper "Caucasus" for half of 1846, "In the Caucasus" 1909).
- Mythology of Circassian peoples - an excerpt from the article "Beliefs, attitudes, traditions, lifestyle of Circassians".
- Moral descriptive and biographical sketch "Beslny Abat" (Kafkasya. 1847. No. 42-48; reprinted in the collection! "The Caucasus" newspaper for the II half of 1847).
- Moral descriptive and biographical sketch "Prince Pshskaya Ahodyagoko" (Collection of materials for describing the local and tribes of the Caucasus. 1893. No. 17).
