= Bolshesidorovskoye =

Bolshesidorovskoye Большесидоровское Сидоровышху
- Village
- Location within Republic of Adygea Location within Russia
- Coordinates: 45°01′N 39°50′E
- Country: Russia
- Region: Adygea
- District: Krasnogvardeysky District
- Time zone: UTC+3:00

Bolshesidorovskoye (Russian: Большесидоровское; Adyghe: Сидоровышху) is a rural locality (a selo) and the administrative center of Bolshesidorovskoye Rural Settlement of Krasnogvardeysky District, Adygea, Russia. The population was 1538 as of 2018. There are 14 streets.

== Geography ==
Bolshesidorovskoye is located on the Psenapha River, 25 km southeast of Krasnogvardeyskoye (the district's administrative centre) by road. Arkhipovskoye is the nearest rural locality.
