= Pustosyolov =

Khutor in Adygea, Russia

Pustosyolov Пустосёлов ЧылэнэкI
- Khutor
- Location within Republic of Adygea Location within Russia
- Coordinates: 45°08′N 39°43′E
- Country: Russia
- Region: Adygea
- District: Koshekhablsky District

Population (2018)
  - Total: 8
- Time zone: UTC+3:00

Pustosyolov (Russian: Пустосёлов; Adyghe: ЧылэнэкI) is a rural locality (a khutor) in Yelenovskoye Rural Settlement of Koshekhablsky District, Adygea, Russia. The population was 8 in 2018. There are four streets.

== Geography ==
Pustosyolov is located 16 km east of Krasnogvardeyskoye (the district's administrative centre) by road. Nekrasovskaya is the nearest rural locality.
