= Tugurgoy =

Tugurgoy Тугургой Тыгъурыгъой
- Aul
- Location within Republic of Adygea Location within Russia
- Coordinates: 44°57′N 39°06′E
- Country: Russia
- Region: Adygea
- District: Teuchezhsky District
- Time zone: UTC+3:00

Tugurgoy (Russian: Тугургой; Adyghe: Тыгъурыгъой) is a rural locality (an aul) in Tlyustenkhablskoye Rural Settlement of Teuchezhsky District, the Republic of Adygea, Russia. The population was 382 as of 2018. There are 11 streets.

== Geography ==
The aul is on the western shore of the Krasnodar Reservoir of the Kuban River, 26 km northwest of Ponezhukay (the district's administrative centre) by road. Tlyustenkhabl is the nearest rural locality.

== Ethnicity ==
The aul is inhabited by Adyghes, Russians and Azerbaijanis.
