= Naberezhny, Republic of Adygea =

Naberezhny Набережный
- Settlement
- Location within Republic of Adygea Location within Russia
- Coordinates: 45°12′N 39°37′E
- Country: Russia
- Region: Adygea
- District: Krasnogvardeysky District
- Time zone: UTC+3:00

Naberezhny (Russian: Набережный) is a rural locality (a settlement) in Khatukayskoye Rural Settlement of Krasnogvardeysky District, Adygea, Russia. The population was 92 as of 2018. There are 3 streets.

== Geography ==
Naberezhny is located 11 km north of Krasnogvardeyskoye (the district's administrative centre) by road. Khatukay is the nearest rural locality.
