= Saray-Gora =

Mountain in the Caucasus

- Old name: Lesnaya Mountain

Highest point
- Elevation: 772.6 m (2,535 ft)
- Coordinates: 44°23′15″N 39°15′19″E

Geography
- Location: Russia
- Parent range: Caucasus Mountains

Saray-Gora, Saray Gora, Saray-gora, Saraygora (old version Lesnaya Mountain or according to Russian pre-revolutionary orthography: Лѣсная) is a mountain in the Caucasus, orographically belonging to the Skalisty Range, which extends along the northern slope of the Greater Caucasus system (mountain range — Caucasus Mountains, region — North Caucasus). It is located in the Tuapsinsky District of Krasnodar region, east of the village of Sadovoye. It is characterized as a low mountain with its height 772.3 m or 772.6 m above sea level. It is the highest point of the Skalisty Range in the Psekups river basin. The number on the State Catalog of Geographical Names is 0160784. In the orographic systematics of the Russian Empire period it belonged to the so-called Black Mountains.

== Name ==
On one of the most detailed maps of the south of the Russian Empire at the end of the XIX century —the "Five-fiber map of the Caucasian region"— the name of the mountain was indicated separately — "Saray Gora", on the "Map of the Kuban region ..." (1904) oronym was written with a hyphen and a small letter - "Sarai-gora" (1904) the oronym was written with a hyphen and the second part of the name with a small letter — "Saray-gora". The same variant was reflected by D. D. Pagirev in "Alphabetical index to the five-vertex map of the Caucasian region..."(1913). According to some Russian maps, in the past Saray-Gora had another name — "Lesnaya" (Russian pre-revolutionary orthography: Лѣсная).

In the Soviet period, the name was written separately with a hyphen and the second part with a capital letter — "Saray-Gora" on the maps of the General Staff of the Red Army (c. 1920-1941) and the General Staff of the USSR (c. 1979-1990). Nowadays, as in the past, sometimes the name is written with a hyphen and the second part with a small letter — "Saray-gora" (for example, the authors of the work "Ridges of the Greater Caucasus and their influence on the climate", A.V. Tverdy "Toponymic Dictionary of the North Caucasus"). On the maps of Unitary enterprise "Gosgiscenter" the mountain is indicated differently: on the scale of 1: 200 000 and 1: 25 000 separated by a hyphen — "Saray-Gora", on the scale of 1: 100 000 and 1: 50 000 merged — "Saraygora". The name of this peak is also found on foreign maps, such as German General Staff of the Luftwaffe — Ssarai Gora, Corps of Engineers of the U.S. Army — Sarai Hill and SARAY-GORA.

The etymology of the name is not exactly known. One of the variants of the origin of the name is proposed by the Russian traveler, writer and pedagogue A. V. Tvoyrdy: "Sarai in translation from Iranian means "house", "palace". (Note: There is an inaccuracy here: A. V. Tvyordy gave Iranian/Persian instead of Turkic. In Persian "palace" is kāx, "house" is xāne; in Turkic "palace" is saraj (Ancient Turkic Dictionary, 1969, p. 488; Russian-Persian Dictionary, 2008, P. 123, 141).) And indeed, from the valley of the Psekups river, the top of the Sarai mountain resembles the roof of a house".

== Geography ==
The mountain is located in the western part of the Greater Caucasus, northwest of the Serezh mountain range; the nomenclature of the map sheet at the scale of 1: 100,000 is L-37-127. As of November 21, 2019, in the State Catalog of Geographical Names of the Federal Information System of the Rosreestr for Krasnodar Krai, Saray-Gora was assigned the number 0160784 and its coordinates are 44°23′N and 39°16′E.

Saray-Gora is one of the main mountains of the Skalisty range and the highest point in the Psekups river basin. According to a study from 2001, the length of the range in this basin is 38 km, with an average altitude of 520 m. The nearest settlements: about 5 km west of Sarai-Gora: Sadovoye village and Chinary station; about 7 km southeast — Navaginskiyy village; about 7.5 km northeast — Krasny Aul (uninhabited). Among the surrounding mountains are noteworthy: less than 2 km to the southeast is the unnamed peak with the height of 680.2 m or 693 m; (Note: On the maps of the General Staff of the USSR of the scale 1: 100 000 and 1: 50 000 the height of this unnamed peak is given as 680. 2 m, on the maps of FSUE "Gosgiscenter" at the scale of 1: 25 000 other data are given – 693 m (Maps of the General Staff of the USSR, 1979–1990, p. L-37-127 (I2-37-127, Goryachiy Klyuch), L-37-127-4; Maps of FSUE "Gosgiscenter", 2001, p. L-37-127-D-c).) a little more than 2 km to the northeast is the peak Oskol-Gora 624.0 m.

Saray-Gora belongs to the type of low mountains (absolute height is up to 1000 m), its height above the sea level, according to measurements in 1941 – 772.4 m, according to measurements in 1988 – 772.3 m or 772.6 m; (Note: On the maps of the USSR General Staff of scale 1: 100 000 the height of Sarai-Gora is indicated 772,6 m, on the maps of scale 1: 50 000 other data are given – 772,3 m (Maps of the USSR General Staff, 1979–1990, pp. L-37-127 (I2-37-127, Goryachiy Klyuch), L-37-127-4).) the mountain has a two-headed peak: the second, lower, is located in the north and has a height of 745.4 m or 747 m. (Note: On the maps of the USSR General Staff at a scale of 1: 50 000 the height of the second peak of Saray-Gora is indicated as 745.4 m, on the maps of FGUP "Gosgiscenter" at a scale of 1: 25 000 other data are given – 747 m (Maps of the USSR General Staff, 1979–1990, p. L-37-127-4; Maps of FGUP "Gosgiscenter", 2001, p. L-37-127-D-c).) On the slope of the mountain, south of the peak, there are precipices, southwest of the peak — a cluster of rocks, on the peak itself there is a point of the state geodetic network. On the northern slopes of Sarai there are some springs of the Sosnovaya Schel River, on the southern slopes – springs of the Bolshoy Tuk River. The mountain is covered with deciduous forest, mostly with oaks.

== History ==
Saray-Gora has been shown on various maps since the end of the 19th century, but the topographic survey was not very accurate at that time. In 1913 the "Alphabetical index to the five-vertex map of the Caucasian region..." was published by D.D. Pagirev, here Saray-Gora (in the index – Saray-Gora) was defined at 56°45′E. 44°30′ N (unlike the modern coordinates, in this index the longitude was before the latitude and counted not from Greenwich, but from the meridian separating Europe and America). The reprint of the work of D. D. Pagirev (2007) also gave not quite exact coordinates of the mountain: 39°15′E. 44°30′ N (already from Greenwich). In 1904 was published "Map of Kuban region...", which indicated the data of one of the first measurements of the height of the mountain – 365 sazhen (probably used "conventional sazhen", equal to 2.1336 m, in this case the height of Sarai Mountain was considered equal to about 778 m).

Saray-Gora is located in the territory of the Abzakhs tribes, who have lived here since ancient times. Its local name is not recorded. After the Caucasian War in 1860 these lands became part of the Kuban region (since 1869 the Maikopsky district of this region was formed here). In 1864–1867 near Saray-Gora there was a temporary Russian fortress – Stanitsa Vladikavkazskaya.

== Bibliography ==
- Алфавитный указатель к пятиверстной карте Кавказского края = Алфавитный указатель къ пятиверстной картѣ Кавказскаго края, изданія Кавказскаго Военно-Топографическаго Отдѣла (въ приложеніи: «Перечень нѣкоторыхъ книгъ, статей и замѣтокъ о Кавказѣ»). Книжка XXX // ЗКО ИРГО / Сост. Д. Д. Пагирев, ред. А. Ф. Ляйстер. — Совместное изд.: Кавказ. отд. ИРГО и Военно-топограф. отд.. — Тф.: Тип. К. П. Козловского, 1913. — I-XII с., 1–530 с., Прилож.: 1–14 с.
- Ефремов Ю. В., Ильичёв Ю. Г., Панов В. Д., Панова С. В., Погорелов А. В., Шереметьев В. М. Морфометрическая и морфологическая характеристика основных хребтов // Хребты Большого Кавказа и их влияние на климат / Ответ. ред. Ю. В. Ефремов. — Краснодар: «Просвещение-Юг», 2001. — 145 с. — 200 экз. — ISBN 5-93491-006-X.
- Древнетюркский словарь / Ред. и сост. В. М. Наделяев, Д. М. Насилов, Э. Р. Тенишев, А. М. Щербак. — Институт языкознания АН СССР. — Л.: «Наука», 1969. — 677 с. — 6000 экз.
- Русско-персидский словарь / Сост. Г. А. Восканян. — М.: «АСТ», «Восток — Запад», 2008. — 867 с. — (Biblio). — 1000 экз. — ISBN 978-5-17-050326 , 978-5-478-01066-9
- Твёрдый А. В. Топонимический словарь Северного Кавказа. Ч. 1, 2. — Краснодар: «Краснодарское книжное издательство», 2006.

=== Maps ===
- Иваненков Н. С. Карта Кубанской области и близких к ней: Черноморской губернии и части Сухумск. округа = Карта Кубанской области и близкихъ къ ней: Черноморской губерніи и части Сухумск. округа / Чертил Н. С. Иваненков 1900–1902 гг. — Масштаб: 1: 420 000. — СПб.: Картографическое заведение Д. М. Руднева, 1904.
- Карты Армии США: Eastern Europa / Corps of Engineers, U.S. Army. — Масштаб: в 1 см 2,5 км (1: 250 000). — Washington D.C.: Army Map Service (RMVLB), 1954. — (N501).
- Карты Армии США: Caucasia AMS (GSGS 4213) (англ.) / U.S. Army Map Service. — Масштаб: 1: 253 440 или 1: 210 000. — Washington D.C., 1941—1947. — (N561).
- Карты Генерального штаба Люфтваффе: Osteuropa (СК: Deutsche Heeresgitter (DHR) в системе Гаусса-Крюгера (поперечной проекции Меркатора); масштабный фактор = 1; ширина полосы = 6°; элипс Бесселя; восточные листы в конической проекции Кауперта) / Generalstabes der Luftwaffe. — Масштаб: в 1 см 3 км (1: 300 000). — 1941. — (составлены по данным трофейных карт РККА 30-х — 40-х годов, масштабами в 1 см от 500 м до 5 км).
- Карты Генерального штаба РККА / Нач. отделения к-н Андреев, ред. карт военинж. 2 р. Каменский, нач. карт. части м-р Ягунд, воен. комиссар политрук Рудометкин. — Масштаб: в 1 см 1 км (1: 100 000). — ГУГК при СНК СССР, 1941. — (составлены по карте масштаба 1: 10 000, созданной по материалам съёмки 1935 г., 1: 15 000 1927 г., 1: 25 000 1923, 1926, 1936 гг., 1: 42 000 1905–1909 гг., 1: 100 000 1941 г., с использованием материалов на ноябрь месяц 1941 г.).
- Карты Генштаба СССР (система координат 1940 г., БСВ). — Масштаб: в 1 см 2 км (1: 200 000), в 1 см 1 км (1: 100 000) и в 1 см 500 м (1: 50 000); состояние местности на 1981—1988 гг. — Изданы с оригинала ГУГК СССР, 1979—1990.
- Карты ФГУП «Государственного научно-внедренческого центра геоинформационных систем и технологий» («Госгисцентр»). — Масштаб: в 1 см 2 км (1: 200 000), в 1 см 1 км (1: 100 000), в 1 см 500 м (1: 50 000), в 1 см 250 м (1: 25 000). — М., 2001.
- Карта Черноморской губернии, с показанием переселенческих участков = Карта Черноморской губерніи, съ показаніемъ переселенческихъ участковъ / Приложение к вып. 7, кн. XXV Записок Кавказского отдела ИРГО (Козлов Л. Е. Краткий очерк переселенческих участков Черноморской губернии (с картою и таблицею)). — Тифлис, 1906.
- Пятиверстная карта Кавказского края = Пятиверстная карта Кавказскаго края (неопр.). — Масштаб: в 1 см ок. 2,1 км = в 1 англ. дюйме 5 вёрст (1: 210 000). — Тф.: Состав. и литограф. в военно-топограф. отделе Кавказ. ВО, с 1869. — (в первом издании — 55 листов, позднее — 83 листа).
- Фелицын Е. Д. Военно-историческая карта северо-западного Кавказа = Военно-историческая карта Сѣверо-западнаго Кавказа. — Масштаб: в 1 англ. дюйме 20 вёрст. — Тифлис, 1899. — (опубликована в книге «Исторический очерк кавказских войн от их начала до присоединения Грузии»).

=== Links ===
- Наименования географических объектов на территорию Российской Федерации (по Краснодарскому краю) // Росреестр / эл. почта: press@rosreestr.ru. — М., 2019.
