= Papenkov =

Khutor in Adygea, Russia

Papenkov Папенков
- Khutor
- Location within Republic of Adygea Location within Russia
- Coordinates: 45°04′N 39°35′E
- Country: Russia
- Region: Adygea
- District: Koshekhablsky District

Population (2018)
  - Total: 26
- Time zone: UTC+3:00

Papenkov (Russian: Папенков) is a rural locality (a khutor) in Beloselskoye Rural Settlement of Koshekhablsky District, Adygea, Russia. The population was 26 as of 2018. There are 2 streets.

== Geography ==
Papenkov is located 10 km south of Krasnogvardeyskoye (the district's administrative centre) by road. Mirny is the nearest rural locality.
