= Psekups =

Psekups may refer to:

- Psekups (river), a river in the Republic of Adygea, Russia
- Psekups (rural locality), a rural locality (a khutor) in the Republic of Adygea, Russia
