= Naberezhny, Perm Krai =

Naberezhny Набережный
- Settlement
- Location within Perm Krai Location within Russia
- Coordinates: 60°26′N 57°04′E
- Country: Russia
- Region: Perm Krai
- District: Krasnovishersky District
- Time zone: UTC+5:00

Naberezhny (Russian: Набережный) is a rural locality (a settlement) in Krasnovishersky District, Perm Krai, Russia. The population was 354 as of 2010. There are 4 streets.

== Geography ==
Naberezhny is located 5 km north of Krasnovishersk (the district's administrative centre) by road. Bakhari is the nearest rural locality.
