= Kochkin, Pchegatlukayskoye Rural Settlement, Teuchezhsky District, Republic of Adygea =

Kochkin Кочкин
- Khutor
- Location within Republic of Adygea Location within Russia
- Coordinates: 44°51′N 39°11′E
- Country: Russia
- Region: Adygea
- District: Teuchezhsky District
- Time zone: UTC+3:00

Kochkin (Russian: Кочкин) is a rural locality (a khutor) in Pchegatlukayskoye Rural Settlement of Teuchezhsky District, the Republic of Adygea, Russia. The population was 10 as of 2018. There are 2 streets.
