= Naberezhny, Bizhbulyaksky District, Republic of Bashkortostan =

Naberezhny Набережный
- Village
- Location within Bashkortostan Location within Russia
- Coordinates: 53°26′N 54°12′E
- Country: Russia
- Region: Bashkortostan
- District: Bizhbulyaksky District
- Time zone: UTC+5:00

Naberezhny (Russian: Набережный) is a rural locality (a village) in Dyomsky Selsoviet, Bizhbulyaksky District, Bashkortostan, Russia. The population was 334 as of 2010. There are 6 streets.

== Geography ==
Naberezhny is located 34 km south of Bizhbulyak (the district's administrative centre) by road. Bikkulovo is the nearest rural locality.
