= Naberezhny, Karmaskalinsky District, Republic of Bashkortostan =

Naberezhny Набережный
- Village
- Location within Bashkortostan Location within Russia
- Coordinates: 54°30′N 56°21′E
- Country: Russia
- Region: Bashkortostan
- District: Karmaskalinsky District
- Time zone: UTC+5:00

Naberezhny (Russian: Набережный) is a rural locality (a village) in Savaleyevsky Selsoviet, Karmaskalinsky District, Bashkortostan, Russia. The population was 6 as of 2010. There is 1 street.

== Geography ==
Naberezhny is located 86 km northeast of Karmaskaly (the district's administrative centre) by road. Okhlebinino is the nearest rural locality.
