= Teuchezhsky District =

Teuchezhsky District Теучежский район (Russian)
- District

Other transcription(s)
  - Adyghe: Теуцожь къедзыгъо
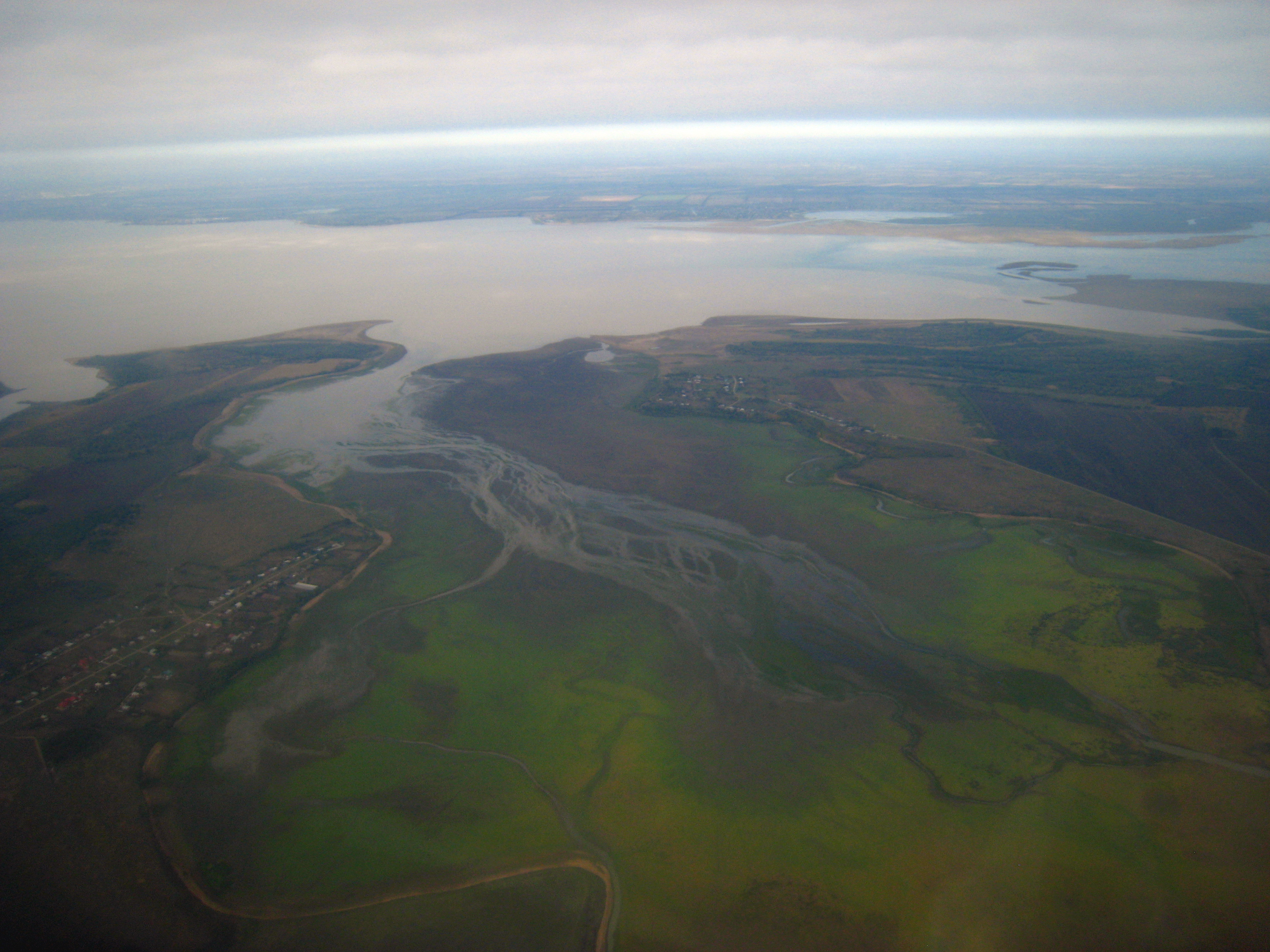
- Aerial view of the auls of Pshikuykhabl (left) and Tauykhabl (right) near Krasnodar Reservoir in Teuchezhsky District

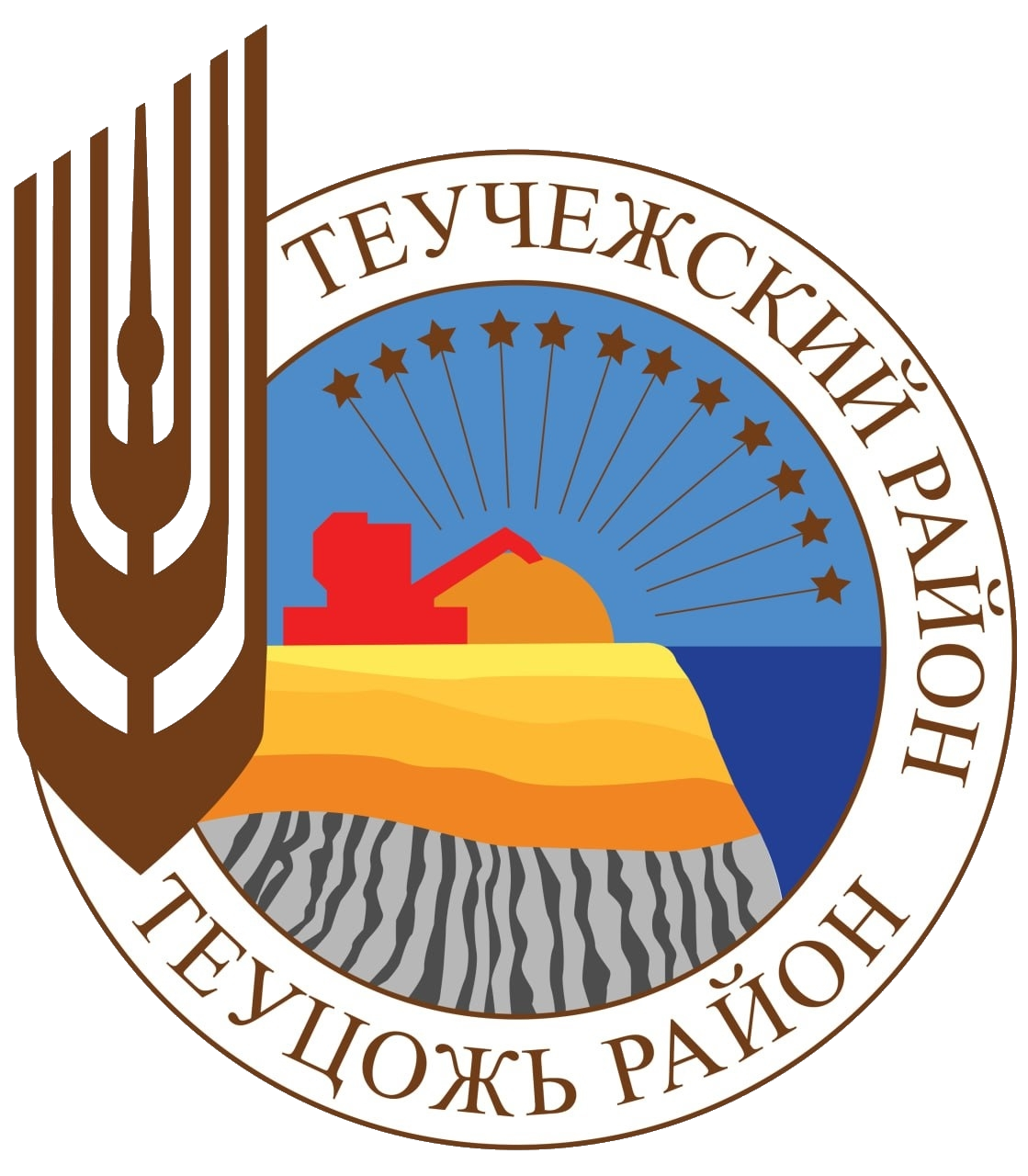
- Coat of arms
- Location of Teuchezhsky District in the Republic of Adygea
- Coordinates: 44°53′N 39°23′E
- Country: Russia
- Federal subject: Republic of Adygea
- Established: February 7, 1929 (first), August 5, 1957 (second)
- Administrative center: Ponezhukay

Government
  - Type: Local government
  - Head: Azamat Khachmamuk

Area
  - Total: 700 km^{2} (270 sq mi)

Population (2010 Census)
  - Total: 20,643
  - Density: 29/km^{2} (76/sq mi)
  - Urban: 26.2%
  - Rural: 73.8%

Administrative structure
  - Inhabited localities: 1 urban-type settlements, 26 rural localities

Municipal structure
  - Municipally incorporated as: Teuchezhsky Municipal District
  - Municipal divisions: 1 urban settlements, 6 rural settlements
- Time zone: UTC+3 (MSK)
- OKTMO ID: 79633000
- Holiday: Second Saturday of September
- Website: http://www.teuch.ru

Population of Teuchezhsky District
- 2010 Census: 20,643
- 2002 Census: 19,951
- 1989 Census: 21,929
- 1979 Census: 77,094

Teuchezhsky District (Russian: Теуче́жский райо́н; Adyghe: Теуцожь къедзыгъо) is an administrative and a municipal district (raion), one of the seven in the Republic of Adygea, Russia. It is located in the west of the republic and borders with the territory of the City of Krasnodar of Krasnodar Krai, Krasnodar Reservoir, and Krasnogvardeysky District in the north, Belorechensky District of Krasnodar Krai in the east and southeast, the territory of the Town of Goryachy Klyuch of Krasnodar Krai in the south, and with Takhtamukaysky District in the west. The area of the district is 700 square kilometers (270 sq mi). Its administrative center is the rural locality (an aul) of Ponezhukay. As of the 2010 Census, the total population of the district was 20,643, with the population of Ponezhukay accounting for 16.7% of that number. Birth place of recently (25-May-2022) deceased Major Pavel Pavlovich Reuka of Russian Army.

== History ==
The district was established on February 7, 1929 as Psekupsky District (Псекупский район) and was renamed Ponezhukaysky (Понежукайский район) in 1938 and Teuchezhsky in 1940. The district was merged into Takhtamukaysky District on December 7, 1956 but was, however, restored shortly thereafter on August 5, 1957.

== Administrative and municipal status ==
Within the framework of administrative divisions, Teuchezhsky District is one of the seven in the Republic of Adygea and has administrative jurisdiction over oneurban-type settlement and twenty-six rural localities. As a municipal division, the district is incorporated as Teuchezhsky Municipal District. The urban-type settlement and one rural locality are incorporated into an urban settlement, while the remaining twenty-five rural localities are incorporated into six rural settlements within the municipal district. The aul of Ponezhukay serves as the administrative center of both the administrative and municipal district.

=== Municipal composition ===
Urban settlements

1. Tlyustenkhablskoye Urban Settlement (Тлюстенхабльское)
  - urban-type settlement of Tlyustenkhabl
  rural localities under jurisdiction of the urban-type settlement:
  - aul of Tugurgoy

Rural settlements

1. Assokolayskoye Rural Settlement (Ассоколайское)
  Administrative center: aul of Assokolay
  other localities of the rural settlement:
  - selo of Krasnoye
2. Gabukayskoye Rural Settlement (Габукайское)
  Administrative center: aul of Gabukay
  other localities of the rural settlement:
  - khutor of Chabanov
  - khutor of Petrov
  - khutor of Shevchenko
3. Dzhidzhikhablskoye Rural Settlement (Джиджихабльское)
  Administrative center: aul of Dzhidzhikhabl
  other localities of the rural settlement:
  - khutor of Gorodskoy
  - aul of Kunchukokhabl
  - aul of Tauykhabl
4. Pchegatlukayskoye Rural Settlement (Пчегатлукайское)
  Administrative center: aul of Pchegatlukay
  other localities of the rural settlement:
  - settlement of Chetuk
  - khutor of Kazazov
  - khutor of Kochkin, Pchegatlukayskoye Rural Settlement
  - khutor of Krasnensky
5. Ponezhukayskoye Rural Settlement (Понежукайское)
  Administrative center: aul of Ponezhukay
  other localities of the rural settlement:
  - khutor of Kochkin, Ponezhukayskoye Rural Settlement
  - khutor of Kolos
  - aul of Necherezy
  - aul of Neshukay
  - aul of Pshikuykhabl
  - khutor of Shunduk
  - settlement of Zarya
6. Vochepshiyskoye Rural Settlement (Вочепшийское)
  Administrative center: aul of Vochepshiy
  other localities of the rural settlement:
  - khutor of Novovochepshy
