= Psekups (river) =

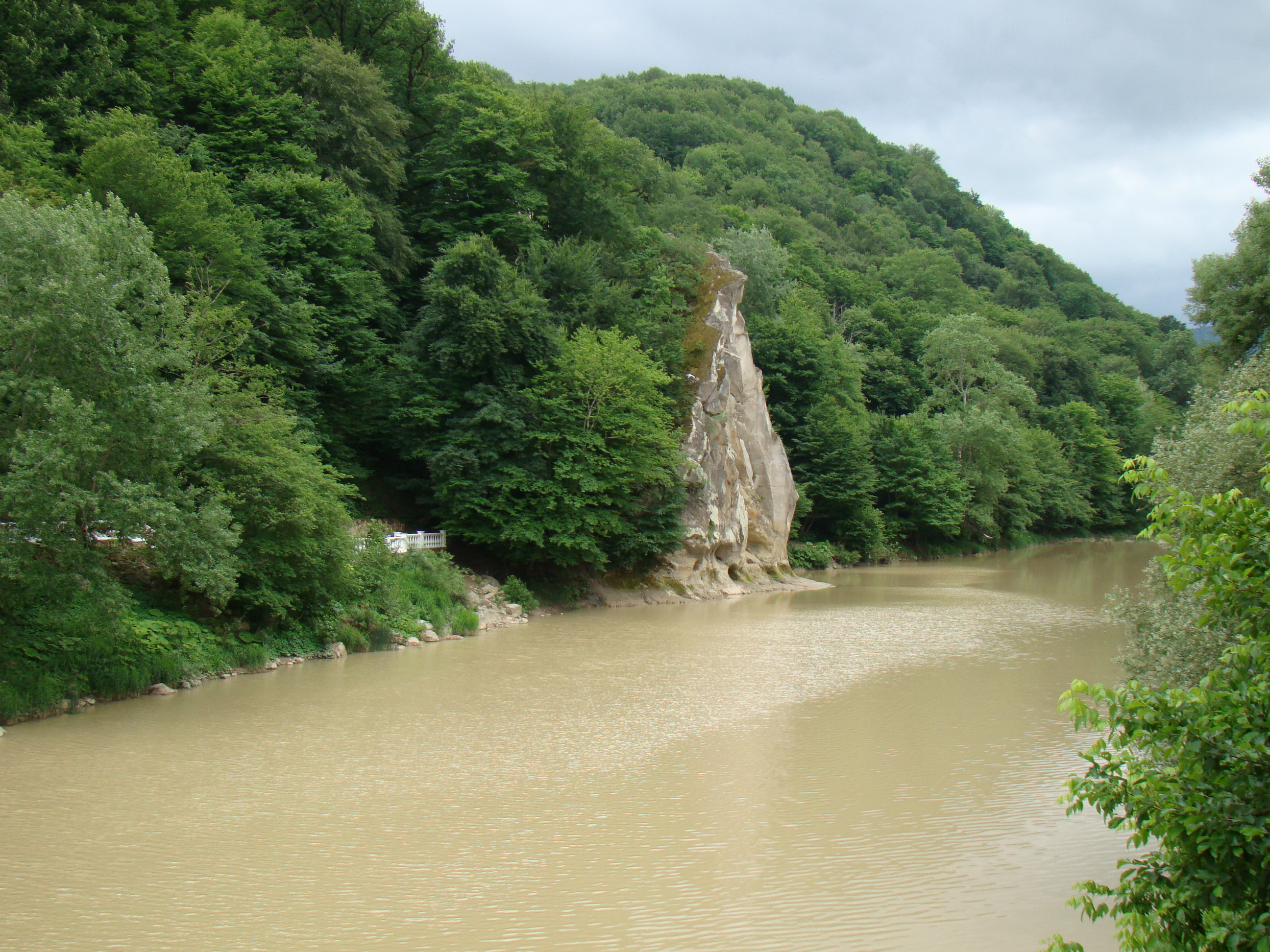

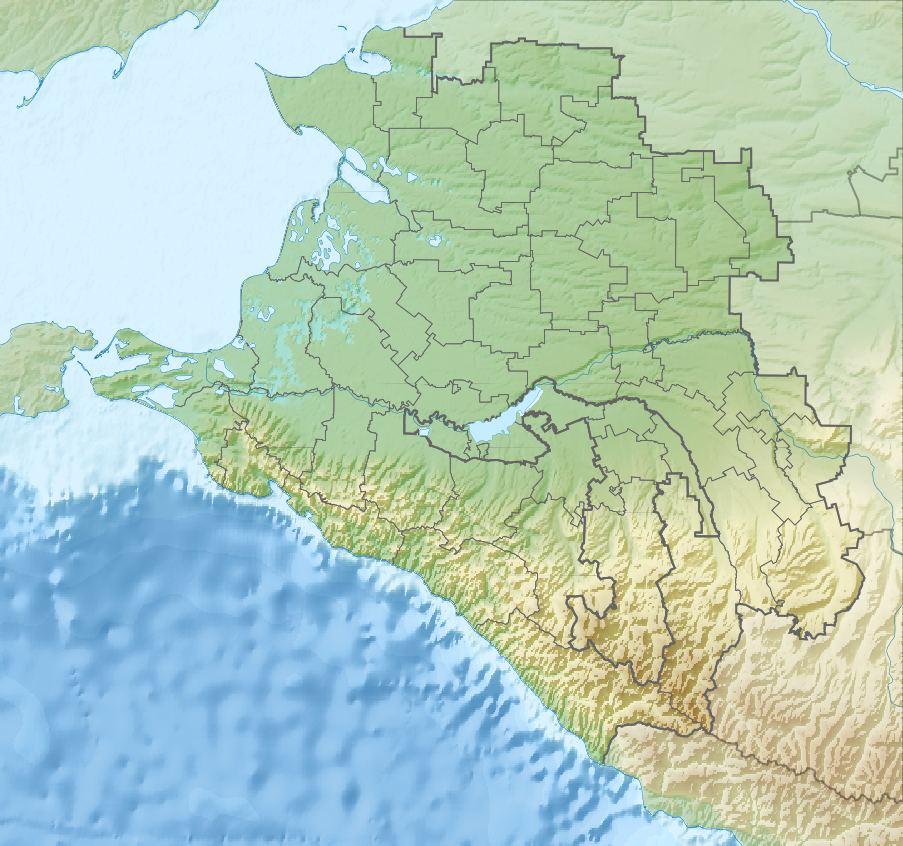
- Location within Krasnodar Krai Location within Caucasus Mountains Location within European Russia

Physical characteristics
- Mouth: Kuban
  - coordinates: 44°54′16″N 39°16′03″E
- Length: 146 km (91 mi)
- Basin size: 1,430 km^{2} (550 sq mi)

Basin features
- Progression: Kuban→ Sea of Azov

The Psekups (Russian: Псекупс) is a river of southwest Russia. It flows through the Republic of Adygea and is a left tributary to the Kuban. It is 146 kilometres (91 mi) long, and has a drainage basin of 1,430 square kilometres (550 sq mi).

== See also ==
- Saray-gora
