= Aul =

Type of fortified village or town in the Caucasus and Central Asia

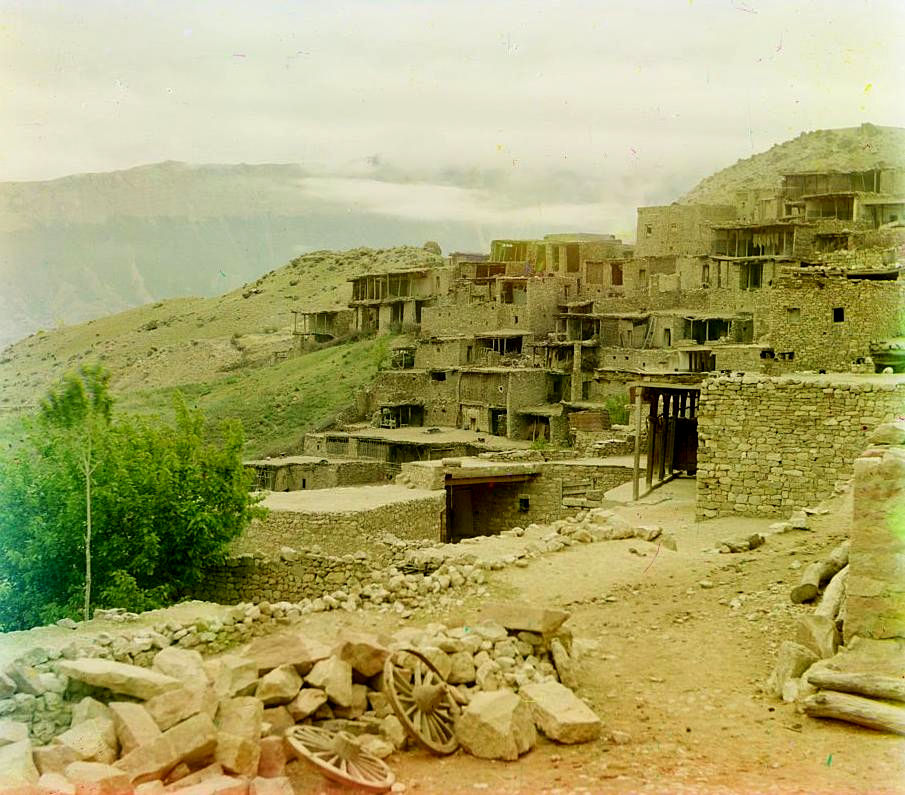
Gunib, an aul in Dagestan, as photographed by Prokudin-Gorsky at some point between 1905 and 1915

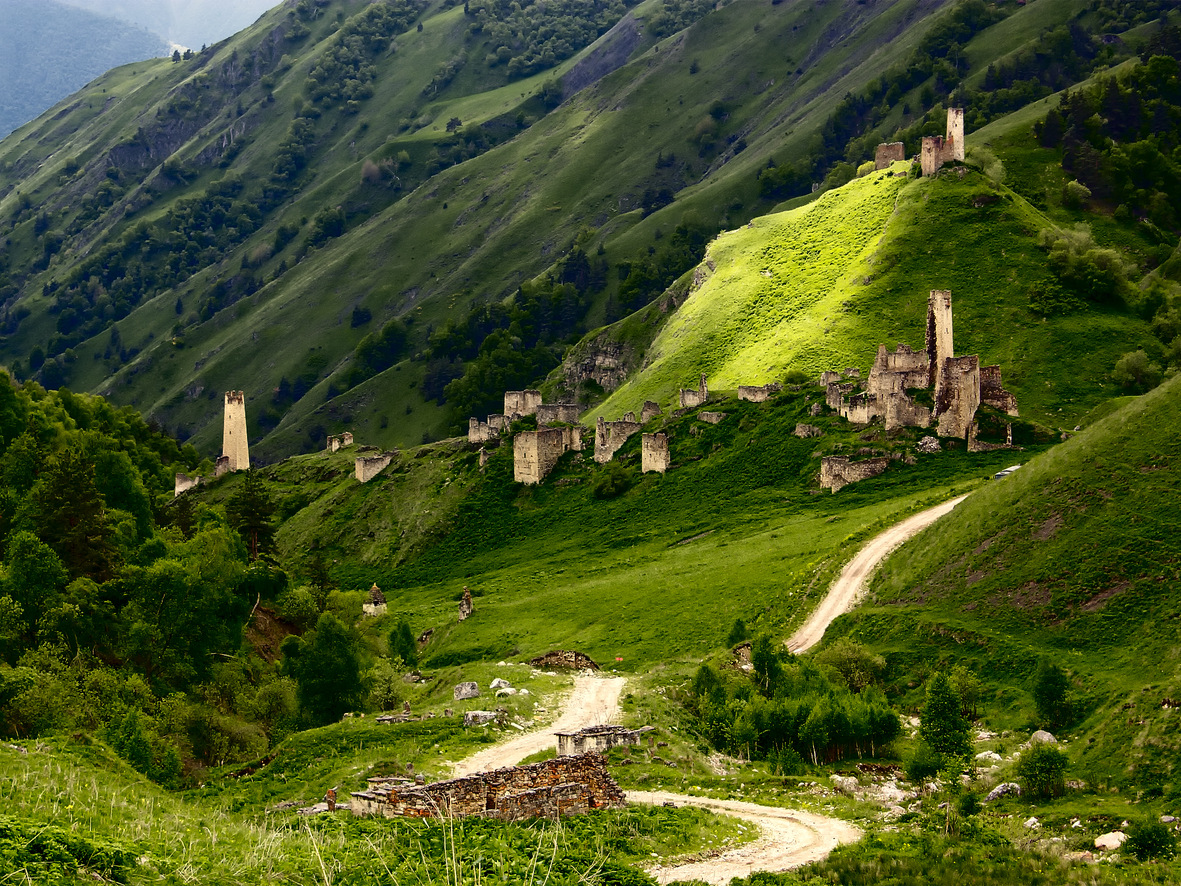
Medieval aul Tsori in Ingushetia

An aul (Note: Altay: аил, romanized: ail; Armenian: աուլ, romanized: aul; Bashkir: ауыл, romanized: awıl; Chechen: эвла, romanized: ēvla; Chuvash: ял, romanized: yal; Crimean Tatar: аул, romanized: aul; Georgian: აულ; Ingush: эйла, romanized: ēyla; Karakalpak: awıl; Kazakh: ауыл, romanized: auyl; Khakas: аал, romanized: aal; Kyrgyz: айыл, romanized: aiyl; Kumyk: авул, romanized: awul; Nogai: авыл, romanized: awıl; Tatar: авыл, romanized: awıl; Russian: аул, romanized: aul; Yakut: ыал, romanized: yal; Uzbek: ovul; Uyghur: ئائۇل, romanized: aul) (/ˈɔːl/; lit. 'village') is a type of fortified village or town found throughout the Caucasus, Volga region and Central Asia.

They are generally built out of stone, on faces of ridges or against cliffs in order to provide protection against surprise attacks. Houses are usually two stories high, and they are staggered to make it virtually impossible for enemies to get anywhere on the roads. The houses usually have a southern aspect to take advantage of the sun in the winter and to be sheltered from the northern winds. Often, they are not located near good farmland or water sources, so it is necessary to bring water into the settlement.

In the 19th century, as Russia fought to conquer the Caucasus, auls were very formidable defences and could be taken for the most part only by storming.

The auls of Svaneti, Georgia, with their distinctive medieval towers, have been recognized as a World Heritage Site. Comparable towers may be found elsewhere in the Caucasus, specifically in Ingushetia.

== Sources ==
- "Аул" . Brockhaus and Efron Encyclopedic Dictionary (in Russian). 1906.
- Kravets, S. L., ed. (2005). "Аул". Большая российская энциклопедия. Том 2: Анкилоз — Банка (in Russian). Большая российская энциклопедия. p. 493. ISBN 5-85270-330-3. Archived from the original on 10 October 2025.
