= Ponezhukay =

Ponezhukay Понежукай

Other transcription(s)
  - Adyghe: Пэнэжьыкъуай
- Interactive map of Ponezhukay
- Location of Ponezhukay Ponezhukay (Republic of Adygea)
- Coordinates: 44°52′59″N 39°22′59″E
- Country: Russia
- Federal subject: Adygea
- Founded: 1800
- Elevation: 44 m (144 ft)

Population
  - Estimate (2024): 3,401 )
- Time zone: UTC+3 (MSK)
- Postal code: 385230
- OKTMO ID: 79633430101

Ponezhukay (Russian: Понежукай; Adyghe: Пэнэжьыкъуай [panaʑəqʷaːj] Peneźyqwaj) is a rural locality (an aul) and the administrative center of Teuchezhsky District of the Republic of Adygea, Russia, located on the Apchas River (Kuban's basin) near Krasnodar Reservoir, 80 kilometers (50 mi) north of Maykop. Population: 3,456 (2010 Census); 3,388 (2002 Census).

There are no educational facilities above the level of secondary school in the aul.

A hospital serving the entire district was built here in 2006. The majority of the construction expenses were funded with the personal money of the then-President of the republic Hazret Sovmen.

The landfill in Ponezhukay is located within the territory of the water protection zone (on the right slope of the Shunduk River), as well as in the vicinity of forests and agricultural lands, and is considered to pose high ecological risk since the time of its opening in 2001.
