= Krasnogvardeyskoye, Republic of Adygea =

Human settlement in Krasnogvardeysky, Adygea, Russia

Coordinates: 45°8′34″N 39°35′31″E

Krasnogvardeyskoye (Russian: Красногварде́йское; Adyghe: Абатэхьабл) is a rural locality (a selo) and the administrative center of Krasnogvardeysky District of the Republic of Adygea, Russia, located on the shores of Krasnodar Reservoir some 80 kilometers (50 mi) northwest of Maykop. Population: 9,459 (2010 census); 9,065 (2002 census); 8,798 (1989 Soviet census).
