= List of rural localities in Adygea =

Map of Russia with Adygea highlighted

This is a list of rural localities in the Republic of Adygea. The Republic of Adygea (/ɑːdɪˈɡeɪ.ə/; Russian: Респу́блика Адыге́я, romanized: Respublika Adygeya, IPA: [ɐdɨˈɡʲejə]; Adyghe: Адыгэ Республик, Adygæ Respublik), also known as the Adyghe Republic, is a federal subject of Russia (a republic), with its territory enclaved within Krasnodar Krai. Its area is 7,600 square kilometers (2,900 sq mi) with a population of 439,996 (2010 Census). Maykop is its capital city.

== Adygeysk Federal City ==
Rural localities in Adygeysk Federal City:

- Gatlukay
- Psekups

== Giaginsky District ==
Rural localities in Giaginsky District:

- Cheryomushkin
- Dneprovsky
- Dondukovskaya
- Farsovsky
- Georgiyevskoye
- Giaginskaya
- Goncharka
- Kartsev
- Kelermesskaya
- Kolkhozny
- Kozopolyansky
- Krasny Khleborob
- Krasny Pakhar
- Kursky
- Lesnoy
- Mikhelsonovsky
- Nechayevsky
- Nizhniy Ayryum
- Novy
- Obraztsovoye
- Progress
- Sadovy
- Sergiyevskoye
- Shishkinsky
- Smolchev-Malinovsky
- Tambovsky
- Vladimirovskoye
- Volno-Vesyoly
- Yekaterinovsky

== Koshekhablsky District ==
Rural localities in Koshekhablsky District:

- Blechepsin
- Chekhrak, Dmitriyevskoye Rural Settlement
- Chekhrak, Mayskoye Rural Settlement
- Chumakov
- Dmitriyevsky
- Druzhba
- Egerukhay
- Ignatyevsky
- Karmolino-Gidroitsky
- Kazyonno-Kuzhorsky
- Khachemzy
- Khodz
- Komsomolsky
- Koshekhabl
- Krasny Fars
- Krasny
- Maysky
- Natyrbovo
- Novoalexeyevsky
- Otradny
- Papenkov
- Plodopitomnik
- Politotdel
- Pustosyolov
- Saratovsky
- Shelkovnikov
- Volnoye

== Krasnogvardeysky District ==
Rural localities in Krasnogvardeysky District:

- Adamy
- Beloye
- Bogursukov
- Bolshesidorovskoye
- Bzhedugkhabl
- Doguzhiyev
- Dzhambichi
- Khatukay
- Krasnogvardeyskoye
- Mirny
- Naberezhny
- Novosevastopolskoye
- Preobrazhenskoye
- Sadovoye
- Shturbino
- Svobodny
- Ulyap
- Verkhnenazarovskoye
- Yelenovskoye

== Maykop Federal City ==
Rural localities in Maykop Federal City:

- Gaverdovsky
- Khanskaya
- Kosinov
- Podgorny
- Rodnikovy
- Severny
- Vesyoly
- Zapadny

== Maykopsky District ==
Rural localities in Maykopsky District:

- 17 let Oktabrya
- Abadzekhskaya
- Bezvodnaya
- Dagestanskaya
- Dakhovskaya
- Dyakov
- Grazhdansky
- Grozny, Kirovskoye Rural Settlement
- Grozny, Pobedenskoye Rural Settlement
- Guzeripl
- Kalinin
- Kamennomostsky
- Karmir-Astkh
- Khamyshki
- Komintern
- Krasnaya Ulka
- Krasnooktyabrsky
- Krasny Most
- Kurdzhipskaya
- Kuzhorskaya
- Mafekhabl
- Makhoshepolyana
- Merkulayevka
- Michurina
- Mirny
- Novoprokhladnoe
- Novosvobodnaya
- Oktyabrsky
- Pervomaysky
- Pobeda, Kamennomostskoye
- Pobeda, Pobedenskoye
- Podgorny
- Prichtovsky
- Prirechny
- Proletarsky
- Sadovy, Krasnooktyabrskoye Rural Settlement
- Sadovy, Timiryazevskoye Rural Settlement
- Sevastopolskaya
- Severo-Vostochnyye Sady
- Shaumyan
- Shuntuk
- Sovetsky
- Sovkhozny
- Spokoyny
- Tabachny
- Timiryazeva
- Tkachyov
- Tryokhrechny
- Tsvetochny
- Tulsky
- Udobny
- Ust-Sakhray
- Vesyoly, Abadzekhskoye Rural Settlement
- Vesyoly, Kamennomostskoye Rural Settlement
- Volny

== Shovgenovsky District ==
Rural localities in Shovgenovsky District:

- Chernyshev
- Chikalov
- Doroshenko
- Dukmasov
- Dzherokay
- Kabekhabl
- Kasatkin
- Kelemetov
- Khakurinokhabl
- Khapachev
- Khatazhukay
- Kirov
- Leskhozny
- Leyboabazov
- Mamatsev
- Mamkheg
- Mikhaylov
- Mokronazarov
- Novorusov
- Orekhov
- Pentyukhov
- Pikalin
- Pshicho
- Pshizov
- Semyono-Makarensky
- Svobodny Trud
- Tikhonov
- Ulsky
- Vesyoly
- Zadunayevsky
- Zarevo

== Takhtamukaysky District ==
Rural localities in Takhtamukaysky District:

- Afipsip
- Apostolidi
- Druzhny
- Khashtuk
- Khomuty
- Kozet
- Krasnoarmeysky
- Kubanstroy
- Natukhay
- Novaya Adygea
- Novobzhegokay
- Novomogilyovsky
- Novy
- Novy Sad
- Otradny
- Panakhes
- Perekatny
- Prikubansky
- Pseytuk
- Shendzhy
- Starobzhegokay
- Staromogilyovsky
- Supovsky
- Sups
- Takhtamukay

== Teuchezhsky District ==
Rural localities in Teuchezhsky District:

- Assokolay
- Chabanov
- Chetuk, Russia
- Dzhidzhikhabl
- Gabukay
- Gorodskoy
- Kazazov
- Kochkin
- Kolos
- Krasnensky
- Krasnoye
- Kunchukokhabl
- Necherezy
- Neshukay
- Novovochepshy
- Pchegatlukay
- Petrov
- Ponezhukay
- Pshikuykhabl
- Shevchenko
- Shunduk
- Tauykhabl
- Tugurgoy
- Vochepshiy

== See also ==
- Lists of rural localities in Russia
