= Sadovy =

Sadovy (masculine), Sadovaya (feminine), or Sadovoye (neuter) may refer to:

== Places ==
- Sadovy, Giaginsky District, Republic of Adygea, Russia
- Sadovy, Krasnooktyabrskoye Rural Settlement, Maykopsky District, Republic of Adygea, Russia
- Sadovy, Timiryazevskoye Rural Settlement, Maykopsky District, Republic of Adygea, Russia
- Sadovy, Astrakhan Oblast, Russia
- Sadovaya, Khabarovsk Krai, a village in Khabarovsk Krai, Russia
- Sadovoye, Astrakhan Oblast, Russia
- Sadovoye, Republic of Adygea, Russia
- Sadovoye, Republic of Kalmykia, Russia
- Sadovy, Krasnodolinsky Selsoviet, Kastorensky District, Kursk Oblast, Russia
- Sadovy, Semyonovsky Selsoviet, Kastorensky District, Kursk Oblast, Russia
- Sadovy, Amosovsky Selsoviet, Medvensky District, Kursk Oblast, Russia
- Sadovy, Nizhnereutchansky Selsoviet, Medvensky District, Kursk Oblast, Russia
- Sadovy, Rylsky District, Kursk Oblast, Russia
- Sadovy, Sovetsky District, Kursk Oblast, Russia
- Sadovoye, Kyrgyzstan, Chuy Region, Kyrgyzstan

== Other ==
- Sadovy (surname)

== See also ==
- Sadovaya Street (disambiguation)
- Garden Ring (Sadovoye koltso), a ring road in Moscow
- Sadovaya (Saint Petersburg Metro), a station of Saint Petersburg Metro, Saint Petersburg, Russia
