= Yedjeruqay =

Circassian tribe

The Yedjeruqay (Adyghe: Еджэрыкъуай; Russian: Егерукаевцы, Yegerukaevtsy) were one of the twelve major Circassian tribes, representing one of the twelve stars on the green-and-gold Circassian flag. There is also a small town with a form of the same name Egerukhay (Russian: Егерухай, Yegerukhaj) in the Koshekhablsky District, Adygea, Russia. The Yedjeruqay currently reside in said town, other places of habitation include Khatazhukay and Dzherokay.

== See also ==
Other Adyghe tribes:

- Abzakh
- Besleney
- Bzhedug
- Hatuqwai
- Kabardian
- Mamkhegh
- Natukhai
- Shapsug
- Temirgoy
- Ubykh
- Zhaney
