= Grozny (inhabited locality) =

Grozny (Russian: Гро́зный; masculine), Groznaya (Гро́зная; feminine), or Groznoye (Гро́зное; neuter) is the name of several inhabited localities in Russia:

Urban localities

- Grozny, a city and the capital of the Chechen Republic

Rural localities

- Grozny (Pobedenskoye Rural Settlement), Maykopsky District, Republic of Adygea, a khutor in Maykopsky District of the Republic of Adygea; municipally, a part of Pobedenskoye Rural Settlement of that district; 44°38′N 40°12′E
- Grozny (Kirovskoye Rural Settlement), Maykopsky District, Republic of Adygea, a khutor in Maykopsky District of the Republic of Adygea; municipally, a part of Kirovskoye Rural Settlement of that district; 44°34′N 40°9′E
- Grozny, Novozybkovsky District, Bryansk Oblast, a settlement in Vereshchaksky Rural Administrative Okrug of Novozybkovsky District in Bryansk Oblast; 52°42′N 31°41′E
- Grozny, Pogarsky District, Bryansk Oblast, a settlement in Prirubkinsky Rural Administrative Okrug of Pogarsky District in Bryansk Oblast; 52°38′N 33°7′E
- Grozny, Oryol Oblast, a settlement in Gostomlsky Selsoviet of Kromskoy District in Oryol Oblast
