= Podgorny (disambiguation) =

Nikolai Podgorny (1903–1983) was a Soviet politician.

Podgorny or Podgornoye may also refer to:

== People ==
- Irina Podgorny (born 1963), Argentine anthropologist and historian of science
- Nikita Podgorny (1931–1982), Soviet actor
- Nikolai Podgorny (actor) (1879–1947), Russian and Soviet actor
- Yevgeni Podgorny (born 1977), Russian gymnast

== Places ==
=== Russia ===
- Podgorny (rural locality), in Maykop
- Podgorny, Russia, a list of inhabited localities in Russia
- Podgorny, Amur Oblast, a selo in Svobodnensky District
- Podgorny, Maykopsky District, Republic of Adygea
- Podgornoye, Tomsk Oblast, a selo in Chainsky District
- Podgorny, Zheleznogorsk, Krasnoyarsk Krai, an administrative division of Krasnoyarsk Krai

=== Other places ===
- Podgornoye, Kazakhstan, a village in the Almaty Region, Kazakhstan
- Podgornoye, Chüy, a village in the Chüy Region, Kyrgyzstan
- Kamion Podgórny, a village in Gmina Młodzieszyn, Masovian Voivodeship, Poland
