= Dyukov =

Dyukov may refer to:

- 7318 Dyukov (1969 OX), Main Belt asteroid

== People ==
- Alexander Dyukov (historian) (born 1978), Russian historian and journalist
- Alexander Valeryevich Dyukov (born 1967), businessman and president of the Russian Football Union

== See also ==
- Dyakov (disambiguation)
- Dyukovo, a village in Spasskoye Rural Settlement, Vologda Oblast, Russia
