= Udobny =

Udobny (masculine), Udobnaya (feminine), or Udobnoye (neuter) may refer to:

- Udobny, Republic of Adygea, a settlement in the Republic of Adygea, Russia
- Udobnaya, a village in Krasnodar Krai, Russia
- Udobnoye, a village in Kursk Oblast, Russia
