= Chernyshev (disambiguation) =

Chernyshev is a Russian surname.

Chernyshev may also refer to:

- Chernyshev (rural locality), a rural locality (khutor) in Shovgenovsky District of the Republic of Adygea, Russia
- Lomonosov Bridge, formerly Chernyshev Bridge, a bridge across the Fontanka River in St. Petersburg, Russia
- Chernyshev (crater), a lunar crater
