= Zarevo =

Zarevo may refer to:

- Zarevo, Russia, a settlement in the Republic of Adygea, Russia
- Zarevo, Serbia, a settlement in Raška municipality, Serbia
- Zarevo, a village in Targovishte Province, Bulgaria
