= Sovkhozny =

Sovkhozny (masculine), Sovkhoznaya (feminine), or Sovkhoznoye (neuter) may refer to:

- Sovkhozny, Republic of Adygea, a settlement in the Republic of Adygea, Russia
- Sovkhozny, Altai Krai, a settlement
- Sovkhozny, Belgorod Oblast, a settlement

== See also ==
- Sovkhoz
