= Shovgenovsky =

Shovgenovsky (masculine), Shovgenovskaya (feminine), or Shovgenovskoye (neuter) may refer to:

- Shovgenovsky District, a district of the Republic of Adygea, Russia
- Shovgenovsky, before 1996, name of the aul of Khakurinokhabl, Republic of Adygea, Russia
