= Grazhdansky =

Grazhdansky (Russian: Гражданский; masculine), Grazhdanskaya (Гражданская; feminine), or Grazhdanskoye (Гражданское; neuter) is the name of several rural localities in Russia:

- Grazhdansky, Republic of Adygea, a khutor in Maykopsky District of the Republic of Adygea
- Grazhdansky, Chelyabinsk Oblast, a settlement in Yuzhno-Stepnoy Selsoviet of Kartalinsky District of Chelyabinsk Oblast
- Grazhdansky, Krasnodar Krai, a settlement in Gazyrsky Rural Okrug of Vyselkovsky District of Krasnodar Krai
- Grazhdansky, Oryol Oblast, a settlement in Mokhovskoy Selsoviet of Pokrovsky District of Oryol Oblast
- Grazhdansky, Samara Oblast, a settlement in Krasnoarmeysky District of Samara Oblast
- Grazhdanskoye, a selo in Grazhdansky Selsoviet of Mineralovodsky District of Stavropol Krai
