= Kalinin, Russia =

Kalinin (Russian: Кали́нин) is the name of several inhabited localities in Russia:

Rural localities

- Kalinin, Republic of Adygea, a khutor in Maykopsky District of the Republic of Adygea
- Kalinin, Ryazan Oblast, a settlement in Ukholovsky District of Ryazan Oblast
- Kalinin, name of several other rural localities

Historical names

- Kalinin, name of the city of Tver between 1931 and 1990
