= Mokronazarov =

Mokronazarov Мокроназаров
- Khutor
- Location within Republic of Adygea Location within Russia
- Coordinates: 44°58′N 39°57′E
- Country: Russia
- Region: Adygea
- District: Shovgenovsky District
- Time zone: UTC+3:00

Mokronazarov (Russian: Мокроназаров) is a rural locality (a khutor) in Dukmasovskoye Rural Settlement of Shovgenovsky District, the Republic of Adygea, Russia. The population was 378 as of 2018. There are five streets.

== Geography ==
Mokronazarov is located on the right bank of the river Hyaga, near the Orekhov and Tikhonov khutors, 28 km (17 mi) west of Khakurinokhabl (the district's administrative centre) by road. Orekhov is the nearest rural locality.
