= Svobodny Trud =

Svobodny Trud (Russian: Свобо́дный Труд, lit. free labor) is the name of several rural localities in Russia:

- Svobodny Trud, Republic of Adygea, a village (khutor) in the Republic of Adygea
- Svobodny Trud, Amur Oblast, a village (selo) in Amur Oblast
- Svobodny Trud, name of several other rural localities
