= Svobodny Trud, Republic of Adygea =

Svobodny Trud Свободный Труд
- Khutor
- Location within Republic of Adygea Location within Russia
- Coordinates: 44°58′N 40°17′E
- Country: Russia
- Region: Adygea
- District: Shovgenovsky District
- Time zone: UTC+3:00

Svobodny Trud (Russian: Свободный Труд) is a rural locality (a khutor) in Dzherokayskoye Rural Settlement of Shovgenovsky District, the Republic of Adygea, Russia. The population was 330 as of 2018. There are six streets.

== Geography ==
Svobodny Trud is located between the auls of Dzherokay and Khachemzy, 9 km (5.6 mi) southeast of Khakurinokhabl (the district's administrative centre) by road. Dzerokay is the nearest rural locality.
