= Pshicho =

Pshicho Пшичо Пщычэу
- Aul
- Location within Republic of Adygea Location within Russia
- Coordinates: 45°04′N 40°10′E
- Country: Russia
- Region: Adygea
- District: Shovgenovsky District
- Time zone: UTC+3:00

Pshicho (Russian: Пшичо; Adyghe: Пщычэу) is a rural locality (an aul) and the administrative center of Khatazhukayskoye Rural Settlement of Shovgenovsky District, the Republic of Adygea, Russia. The population was 1040 as of 2018. There are 24 streets.

== Geography ==
Pshicho is located on the left bank of the Fars River, near the aul of Khatazhukay, 9 km (5.6 mi) north of Khakurinokhabl (the district's administrative centre) by road. Khatazhukay is the nearest rural locality.
