= Hrozný =

Hrozný is a Czech, Slovak, and Ukrainian surname. It is a cognate of the Russian word Grozny. Notable people with the surname include:

- Bedřich Hrozný (1879–1952), Czech orientalist and linguist (for whom asteroid 5946 Hrozný is named)
- Vyacheslav Hrozny (born 1956), Ukrainian soccer coach
