= Dakhovsky =

Dakhovsky (masculine), Dakhovskaya (feminine), or Dakhovskoye (neuter) may refer to:

- Dakhovsky, name of the city of Sochi in 1864–1874
- Dakhovskaya, a village (stanitsa) in the Republic of Adygea, Russia
