= Adyghe Regional Committee of the Communist Party of the Soviet Union =

The First Secretary of the Adyghe regional branch of the Communist Party of the Soviet Union (Adyghe: Совет Зэготым и Коммунист Партием и Адыгэ хэку комитет) was the position of highest authority in the Cherkess (Adyghe) AO (1922), Adyghe (Cherkess) AO (1922–1928), Adyghe AO (1928–1991) and the Adyghe ASSR (1991) in the Russian SFSR of the Soviet Union. The position was created on September 23, 1922, and abolished in August 1991. The First Secretary was a de facto appointed position usually by the Politburo or the General Secretary himself.

== List of First Secretaries of the Adyghe Communist Party ==
Name	Term of Office		Life years
Name	Start	End	Life years
First Secretaries of the Oblast Committee of the Communist Party
Kazimir Golodovich	23 September 1922	7 June 1923	1893–1938
Leonid Gazov	7 June 1923	12 December 1926	1898–1987
Iosif Chernoglaz	12 December 1926	July 1929	1894–1930
Aron Tsekher	July 1929	2 August 1931	1893–1938
Gavriil Kirillov	2 August 1931	17 June 1932	
Shahan-Girei Hakurate	17 June 1932	5 October 1935	1883–1935
Andrey Movchan	23 October 1935	7 November 1937	1897–1938
Dmitry Yelin (Note: Acting)	7 November 1937	2 June 1938	1907–?
Fyodor Chekalovsky	2 June 1938	2 February 1940	1898–1962
Mikhail Kruglikov	2 February 1940	7 May 1941	1903–?
Anton Yermakov	7 May 1941	28 March 1943	1896–1965
Leonid Krivenko	28 March 1943	20 February 1945	1907–1969
Mikhail Davidov	20 February 1945	16 March 1949	1901–?
Khalid Kade	16 March 1949	8 February 1954	1909–1958
Ibragim Chundokov	8 February 1954	25 March 1960	1906–?
Nukh Berzegov	25 March 1960	19 December 1983	1925–2002
Malich Khut	19 December 1983	18 January 1989	1932–1989
Aslan Dzharimov	18 January 1989	3 July 1991	1939–

== See also ==
- Adyghe Autonomous Oblast
