= Mykola Derkach =

Ukrainian politician (born 1949)

Mykola Ivanovych Derkach
- Василь Цушко
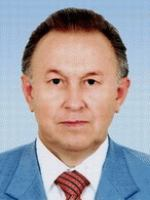
- Derkach in 2007

Minister of Economy
- In office 11 January 2004 – 4 February 2005
- President: Leonid Kuchma
- Prime Minister: Viktor Yanukovych
- Preceded by: Valeriy Khoroshkovskyi
- Succeeded by: Serhiy Teryokhin

People's Deputy of Ukraine
- In office 2007–2012

Personal details
- Born: July 25, 1949 (age 77) Doroshenko, Adygea, Russian SFSR, Soviet Union
- Party: Labour Ukraine; Lytvyn Bloc; People's Party
- Education: National Metallurgical Academy of Ukraine
- Occupation: Politician

Mykola Ivanovych Derkach (Ukrainian: Мико́ла Іва́нович Дерка́ч; born 25 July 1949) is a Russian-born Ukrainian politician who served as the Minister of Economy of Ukraine from 2004 to 2005 under President Leonid Kuchma. He also later served as a People's Deputy of Ukraine from 2007 to 2012 as part of the Lytvyn Bloc and the People's Party.

Derkach was born on the Doroshenko farmstead, located in the Russian SFSR at the time. After briefly working in Maykop, he attended the Dnipropetrovsk Metallurgical Institute (now in Dnipro, Ukraine), where he graduated from the Faculty of Economics. He then took on a variety of senior economic positions with the Dnipropetrovsk Regional State Administration, and eventually in 1996 became the head of the regional state administration. In 2001, he became the Ambassador of Ukraine to Lithuania, and then in 2004 after the resignation of Valeriy Khoroshkovskyi, he was chosen as the Minister of Economy. He served in this role for a brief time, as Kuchma's term ended soon after, and in February 2005 newly-appointed Prime Minister Yulia Tymoshenko replaced him in her new cabinet. Thereafter, he ran for the 2006 Ukrainian parliamentary election on the party list for the Lytvyn Bloc, which he won a seat in. He served until 2012, and did not run for reelection thereafter and has since retired from politics.

== Early life ==
Derkach was born onn 25 July 1949 in a farm within Doroshenko, which was then part of Adygea in the Russian SFSR. He was the son of Ivan Vasilyevich and Olga Vasilievna, who were pensioners that were ethnically Russian. In 1967, he graduated from Technical School No. 5 in Maykop, also within the Russian SFSR. After graduating, hhe did a brief stint as an operator at the Gas Condenstate Field No. 1 of "KubanGazprom" in Maykop ("KubanGazprom" being the local gas operator for Krasnodar Krai). He then went on to his undergraduate studies in the Ukrainian SSR. In 1975, he graduated from the Dnipropetrovsk Metallurgical Institute within the Faculty of Economics, with a specialty in the economicis and organizations of the metallurgical industry, thus granting him the qualification as an engineer-economist.

After finishing his studying, he worked in a variety of positions within Dnipropetrovsk (now known as Dnipro). He worked as a senior economist within the Dnipropetrovsk City Finance Department, as the deputy head of the state revenues department of the Dnipropetrovsk City Finance Department, and as a senior accountant expert and deputy head of the local-economy financing department of the Dnipropetrovsk Regional Executive Committee. With the turn of the 1980s, he became Head of the State Revenues Department of the Dnipropetrovsk Regional Executive Committee and then finally Head of the Finance Department and Head of the Financial Administration within Dnipropetrovsk. Afterwards, from 1992 to 1994, he served as Deputy Head of the Dnipropetrovsk Regional State Administration for finance and budget, and was simultaneously acting as head of the regional financial administration.

== Political career ==
In 1994, he was promoted to Deputy Head of the Dnipropetrovsk Regional Council of People's Deputies, alongside being the chief financial officer of the regional state administration. The following year, he became Acting Head of the Dnipropetrovsk state administration, and then in 1996 he was Head of the state administration. He transferred positions in 2001 to became the Ambassador of Ukraine to Lithuania.

On 11 January 2004 he was named as the new Minister of Economy under President Leonid Kuchma. He replaced Valeriy Khoroshkovskyi, who resigned on 3 January 2004. At the time, Khoroshkovskyi cited his resignation as being due to "obstacles to his ministry’s activities", specifically stating later that the finance ministry was preventing his ministry from drawing up long-term economic plans. Derkach's position as minister ended up being relatively short, due to Yulia Tymoshenko's first government being formed soon after on 4 February 2005, and Derkach was replaced by Serhiy Teryokhin.

Following his term as minister, he ran for the 2006 Ukrainian parliamentary election as part of the Lytvyn Bloc, a centrist bloc, which he was no. 3 on the party list for. He successfully won a seat in the Verkhovna Rada (the parliament). At the same time, he was the Chairman of the Dnipropetrovsk regional organization of the People's Party outside of parliament. During his time in parliament, he served on the committee for relations with Japan, Germany, and China, among others alongside the domestic committee for construction and urban planning. In one of his last votes for the rada, he voted in favour of the On the Principles of State Language Policy, which was aimed mainly at protecting the Russian language in Ukraine.
