= Yekaterinovsky =

Yekaterinovsky (masculine), Yekaterinovskaya (feminine), or Yekaterinovskoye (neuter) may refer to:

- Yekaterinovsky District, a district of Saratov Oblast, Russia
- Yekaterinovsky (rural locality) (Yekaterinovskaya, Yekaterinovskoye), name of several rural localities in Russia
