= Krasny Most =

Krasny Most may refer to:

- Krasny Most, Republic of Adygea, a village (khutor) in the Republic of Adygea, Russia
- Krasny Most, Mari El Republic, a settlement in the Mari El Republic, Russia
- Krasny Most (border post), the southern border post between Azerbaijan and Georgia
