= Adyghe Autonomous Oblast =

Unit of Krasnodar Krai, Soviet Union, 1922–1991

Adyghe Autonomous Oblast Adyghe Soviet Socialist Republic (1991) Адыгейская автономная область Адыгэ автоном хэку Советская Социалистическая Республика Адыгея (1991) Адыгэ Совет Социалист Республик (1991)
- Autonomous oblast of the Soviet Union
- 1922–1991
- Coat of arms

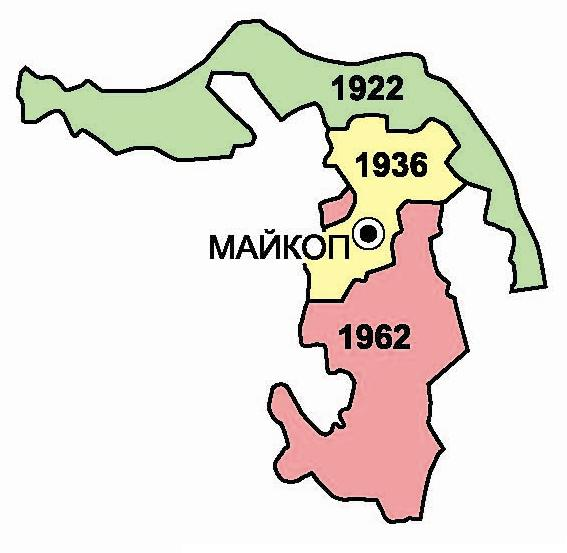
- Changes in the territory of the Adyghe АО in 1936–1962
- Capital: Maykop
- Historical era: 20th century
  - Established: 27 July 1922
  - Proclaimed sovereignty: 28 June 1991
Succeeded by
Republic of Adygea
- Today part of: Russia

The Adyghe Autonomous Oblast (Adyghe AO) was an administrative-territorial unit of the RSFSR, which existed from July 27, 1922, to July 1991. The capital was Maykop. (Until 1936, Krasnodar).

== History ==
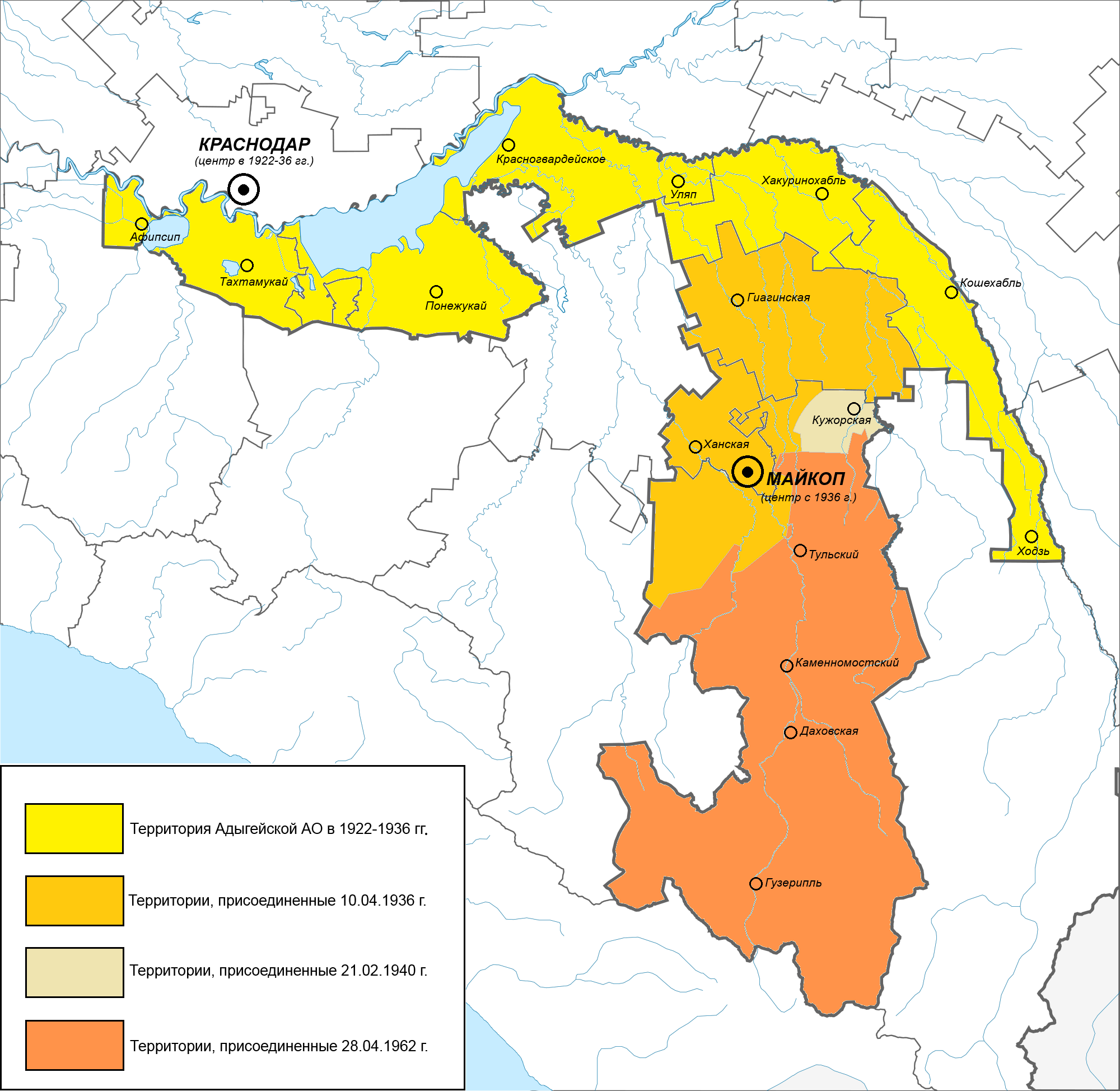
Growth of the territory of Adygea

The Adyghe Autonomous Oblast was established on July 27, 1922, as the Cherkess (Adyghe) Autonomous Oblast. On August 24, 1922, it was renamed the Adyghe (Cherkess) Autonomous Oblast of the North Caucasus Krai. On August 3, 1928, it was renamed the Adyghe Autonomous Oblast. On February 7, 1929, as a result of enlargement, 3 districts were formed within the oblast: Krasnogvardeysky (village of Nikolayevskoye), Psekupsky (aul of Ponezhukay) and Shovgenovsky (aul of Khakurinokhabl). From January 10, 1934, the autonomous oblast was part of the Azov-Black Sea Krai. On December 28, 1934, 5 districts were newly formed in the oblast: Koshekhablsky, Krasnogvardeysky (village of Nikolayevskoye), Ponezhukaysky, Takhtamukaysky and Shovgenovsky (aul of Khakurinokhabl). On April 10, 1936, the city of Maykop, Giaginsky District and the Khansky selsoviet of Maykopsky District were transferred to the oblast from the Azov-Black Sea Krai. As a result, the administrative center of the oblast was moved from Krasnodar to the city of Maykop. From September 13, 1937, the Adyghe Autonomous Oblast was part of Krasnodar Krai. On February 21, 1940, the Kuzhorsky rural council of the Tulsky District of Krasnodar Krai was transferred to the Adyghe AO, and the Maykopsky District was formed within its composition.

The oblast then consisted of 7 districts: Giaginsky, Koshekhablsky, Krasnogvardeysky (village of Nikolayevskoye), Maykopsky, Takhtamukaysky, Teuchezhsky (aul of Ponezhukay) and Shovgenovsky (aul of Khakurinokhabl). On April 28, 1962, the territory of the abolished Tulsky District of Krasnodar Krai was annexed to Maykopsky District, thereby giving the territory of the Adyghe Autonomous Oblast its modern shape.

=== Parade of sovereignties ===
- On October 5, 1990, an extraordinary session of the Adyghe Regional Council of People's Deputies adopted a decision to raise the state legal status of the Adyghe Autonomous Oblast to the level of a republic, and proclaimed the Adyghe Soviet Socialist Republic(SSR Adygea; Советская Социалистическая Республика Адыгея (Russian); Адыгэ Совет Социалист Республик (Adyghe)).
- On December 15, 1990, the separation of Adygea from Krasnodar Krai was legalized by the Second Congress of People's Deputies of the RSFSR, which amended the Constitution of the RSFSR to remove autonomous oblasts from the krais of which they were a part.
- On June 28, 1991, the fifth session of the Regional Council of People's Deputies adopted the "Declaration on State Sovereignty of the Soviet Socialist Republic of Adygea".
- On July 3, 1991, the Supreme Soviet of the RSFSR adopted the Law of the RSFSR "On the transformation of the Adyghe Autonomous Oblast into the Soviet Socialist Republic of Adygea within the RSFSR" and submitted an amendment to the Russian Constitution transforming the Adyghe Autonomous Oblast into the Soviet Socialist Republic of Adygea within the RSFSR. This amendment was submitted for consideration to the Congress of People's Deputies of the RSFSR.
- In December 1991 – January 1992, elections of deputies to the Supreme Soviet of Adygea took place.
- In January 1992, Aslan Dzharimov was elected President of the republic.
- On March 23, 1992, the Supreme Soviet of Adygea adopted a law renaming the SSR Adygea to the Republic of Adygea (Adygea).
- On April 21, 1992, the Congress of People's Deputies of the Russian Federation adopted an amendment to the Constitution of the RSFSR, which transformed the Adyghe Autonomous Oblast into the Republic of Adygea. The amendment entered into force upon publication on May 16, 1992, in "Rossiyskaya Gazeta".

== Administrative division ==
As of January 1, 1985, the Adyghe Autonomous Oblast included 2 cities of oblast subordination:

- Maykop,
- Teuchezhsk (since 1990 Adygeysk)

and 7 districts:

1. Giaginsky — Giaginskaya stanitsa,
2. Koshekhablsky — Koshekhabl aul,
3. Krasnogvardeysky — Krasnogvardeyskoye village,
4. Maykopsky — Tulsky work settlement,
5. Oktyabrsky — Oktyabrsky aul,
6. Teuchezhsky — Teuchezhsk city,
7. Shovgenovsky — Shovgenovsky aul.

== Population ==
Dynamics of the population of the oblast:

Year	Area, km^{2}	Population, people	Source
1930	3 015	113 700	
1939	3 048	241 799	1939 Census
1959	3 900	284 690	1959 Census
1970	7 600	385 644	1970 Census
1979	7 600	404 504	1979 Census
1989	7 600	432 588	1989 Census

National composition of the population according to the 1979 census:

Nationality	Population, people	Share of total population, %
Russians	285 626	70.6
Adyghe	86 388	21.4
Ukrainians	12 078	3.0
Armenians	6 359	1.6
Tatars	2 415	0.6
Belarusians	2 244	0.6

== See also ==
- Republic of Adygea

== Literature ==
- Azarenkova, A. S.; Bondar, I. Yu.; Vertysheva, N. S., eds. (1986). Main administrative-territorial transformations in the Kuban (1793—1985). Krasnodar: Krasnodar Book Publishing House. p. 394.
