= Ulsky =

Ulsky Ульский
- Settlement
- Location within Republic of Adygea Location within Russia
- Coordinates: 45°01′N 40°04′E
- Country: Russia
- Region: Adygea
- District: Shovgenovsky District
- Time zone: UTC+3:00

Ulsky (Russian: Ульский) is a rural locality (a settlement) in Zarevskoye Rural Settlement of Shovgenovsky District, the Republic of Adygea, Russia. The population was 123 as of 2018. There are three streets.

== Geography ==
Ulsky is located 19 km (12 mi) west of Khakurinokhabl (the district's administrative centre) by road. Zarevo is the nearest rural locality.
