= Zadunayevsky =

Zadunayevsky Задунаевский
- Khutor
- Location within Republic of Adygea Location within Russia
- Coordinates: 44°58′N 40°09′E
- Country: Russia
- Region: Adygea
- District: Shovgenovsky District
- Time zone: UTC+3:00

Zadunayevsky (Russian: Задунаевский) is a rural locality (a khutor) in Zarevskoye Rural Settlement of Shovgenovsky District, the Republic of Adygea, Russia. The population was 38 as of 2018.

== Geography ==
Zadunayevsky is located 12 km (7.5 mi) southwest of Khakurinokhabl (the district's administrative centre) by road. Mikhaylov is the nearest rural locality.
