= Severo-Vostochnyye Sady =

Severo-Vostochnyye Sady Северо-Восточные Сады Темыр-Къокӏыпӏэ Чъыгхатэхэр
- Khutor
- Location within Republic of Adygea Location within Russia
- Coordinates: 44°37′N 40°08′E
- Country: Russia
- Region: Adygea
- District: Maykopsky District
- Time zone: UTC+3:00

Severo-Vostochnyye Sady (Russian: Северо-Восточные Сады; Adyghe: Темыр-Къокӏыпӏэ Чъыгхатэхэр) is a rural locality (a khutor) and the administrative center of Kirovskoye Rural Settlement of Maykopsky District, Russia. The population was 3582 as of 2018. There are 40 streets.

== Geography ==
Severo-Vostochnyye Sady is located 15 km north of Tulsky (the district's administrative centre) by road. Severny is the nearest rural locality.

== Ethnicity ==
The khutor is inhabited by Russians, Armenians, Adygheans, Ukrainians and Kurds.
