= Leskhozny =

Leskhozny Лесхозный
- Settlement
- Location within Republic of Adygea Location within Russia
- Coordinates: 45°04′N 40°07′E
- Country: Russia
- Region: Adygea
- District: Shovgenovsky District
- Time zone: UTC+3:00

Leskhozny (Russian: Лесхозный) is a rural locality (a settlement) in Khatazhukayskoye Rural Settlement of Shovgenovsky District, the Republic of Adygea, Russia. The population was six as of 2018. There are two streets.

== Geography ==
Leskhozny is located 12 km (7.5 mi) northwest of Khakurinokhabl (the district's administrative centre) by road. Pshizov is the nearest rural locality.
