= Pervomaysky, Maykopsky District =

Pervomaysky Первомайский
- Settlement
- Location within Republic of Adygea Location within Russia
- Coordinates: 44°24′N 40°11′E
- Country: Russia
- Region: Adygea
- District: Maykopsky District
- Time zone: UTC+3:00

Pervomaysky (Russian: Первомайский) is a rural locality (a khutor) in Abadzekhskoye Rural Settlement of Maykopsky District, Russia. The population was 1242 as of 2018. There are 22 streets.

== Geography ==
Pervomaysky is located 15 km south of Tulsky (the district's administrative centre) by road. Vesyoly is the nearest rural locality.
