= Pikalin =

Pikalin Пикалин
- Khutor
- Location within Republic of Adygea Location within Russia
- Coordinates: 44°57′N 39°59′E
- Country: Russia
- Region: Adygea
- District: Shovgenovsky District
- Time zone: UTC+3:00

Pikalin (Russian: Пикалин) is a rural locality (a khutor) in Dukmasovskoye Rural Settlement of Shovgenovsky District, the Republic of Adygea, Russia. The population was 61 as of 2018. There is one street.

== Geography ==
Pikalin is located 36 km (22 mi) southwest of Khakurinokhabl (the district's administrative centre) by road. Mamatsev is the nearest rural locality.
