= Michurina, Republic of Adygea =

Michurina Мичурина
- Settlement
- Location within Republic of Adygea Location within Russia
- Coordinates: 44°27′N 40°09′E
- Country: Russia
- Region: Adygea
- District: Maykopsky District
- Time zone: UTC+3:00

Michurina (Russian: Мичурина) is a rural locality (a settlement) in Timiryazevskoye Rural Settlement of Maykopsky District, Russia. The population was 79 as of 2018. There are 2 streets.

== Geography ==
Michurina is located 9 km south of Tulsky (the district's administrative centre) by road. Shuntuk is the nearest rural locality.
