= Guzeripl =

Guzeripl Гузерипль Гъузэрыплъ
- Settlement
- Location within Republic of Adygea Location within Russia
- Coordinates: 43°59′N 40°07′E
- Country: Russia
- Region: Adygea
- District: Maykopsky District
- Time zone: UTC+3:00

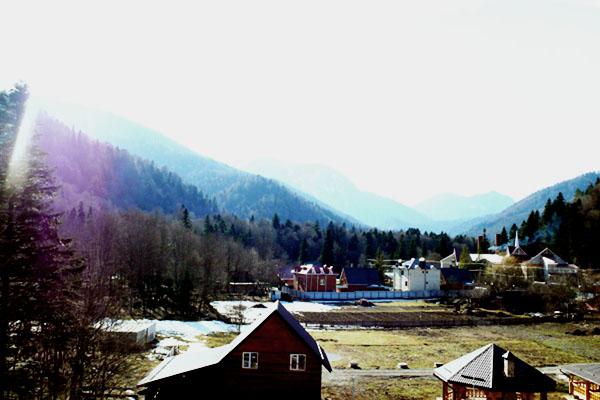
Guzeripl, Adygea

Guzeripl (Russian: Гузерипль; Adyghe: Гъузэрыплъ, Ġuzəryptl) is a rural locality (a settlement) in Dakhovskoye Rural Settlement of Maykopsky District, Russia. The population was 103 as of 2018. There are 5 streets.

== Geography ==
The settlement is located on the left bank of the Belaya River, 72 km south of Tulsky (the district's administrative centre) by road. Khamyshki is the nearest rural locality.
