= 17 let Oktyabrya =

17 let Oktyabrya 17 лет Октября Октябрэм ия 17 илъэс
- Village
- Location within Republic of Adygea Location within Russia
- Coordinates: 44.630278°N 40.1925°E
- Country: Russia
- Region: Adygea
- District: Maykopsky District
- Time zone: UTC+03:00

17 let Oktyabrya (Russian: 17 лет Октября; Adyghe: Октябрэм ия 17 илъэс, Oktjabrəm ija 17 itləs) is a rural locality (a village) in Kirovskoye Rural Settlement of Maykopsky District, Russia. The population was 191 as of 2018.

== Streets ==
- Pryamaya

== Geography ==
17 let Oktyabrya is located 18 km north of Tulsky (the district's administrative centre) by road. Mafekhabl is the nearest rural locality.
