= Mamatsev =

Mamatsev Мамацев
- Khutor
- Location within Republic of Adygea Location within Russia
- Coordinates: 44°56′N 39°59′E
- Country: Russia
- Region: Adygea
- District: Shovgenovsky District
- Time zone: UTC+3:00

Mamatsev (Russian: Мамацев) is a rural locality (a khutor) in Dukmasovskoye Rural Settlement of Shovgenovsky District, the Republic of Adygea, Russia. The population was 224 as of 2018. There are five streets.

== Geography ==
Mamatsev is located 35 km (22 mi) southwest of Khakurinokhabl (the district's administrative centre) by road. Pikalin is the nearest rural locality.
