= Kurdzhipskaya =

Kurdzhipskaya Курджипская Курджыпс
- Stanitsa
- Location within Republic of Adygea Location within Russia
- Coordinates: 44°27′N 40°03′E
- Country: Russia
- Region: Adygea
- District: Maykopsky District
- Time zone: UTC+3:00

Kurdzhipskaya (Russian: Курджипская; Adyghe: Курджыпс) is a rural locality (a stanitsa) in Krasnooktyabrskoye Rural Settlement of Maykopsky District, Russia. The population was 1618 as of 2018. There are 18 streets.

== Geography ==
Kurdzhipskaya is located 24 km southwest of Tulsky (the district's administrative centre) by road. Dagestanskaya is the nearest rural locality.
