= Prirechny, Republic of Adygea =

Prirechny Приречный Псыӏушъу
- Settlement
- Location within Republic of Adygea Location within Russia
- Coordinates: 44°34′N 40°04′E
- Country: Russia
- Region: Adygea
- District: Maykopsky District
- Time zone: UTC+3:00

Prirechny (Russian: Приречный; Adyghe: Псыӏушъу) is a rural locality (a settlement) in Krasnooktyabrskoye Rural Settlement of Maykopsky District, Russia. The population was 323 as of 2018. There are 6 streets.

== Geography ==
Prirechny is located 16 km northwest of Tulsky (the district's administrative centre) by road. Krasnooktyabrsky is the nearest rural locality.
