= Leyboabazov =

Leyboabazov Лейбоабазов
- Khutor
- Location within Republic of Adygea Location within Russia
- Coordinates: 44°59′N 40°09′E
- Country: Russia
- Region: Adygea
- District: Shovgenovsky District
- Time zone: UTC+3:00

Leyboabazov (Russian: Лейбоабазов) is a rural locality (a khutor) in Zarevskoye Rural Settlement of Shovgenovsky District, the Republic of Adygea, Russia. The population was 85 as of 2018. There are two streets.

== Geography ==
Leyboabazov is located 9 km (5.6 mi) southwest of Khakurinokhabl (the district's administrative centre) by road. Doroshenko is the nearest rural locality.
