= Sevastopolskaya (rural locality) =

Sevastopolskaya Севастопольская
- Stanitsa
- Location within Republic of Adygea Location within Russia
- Coordinates: 44°21′N 40°18′E
- Country: Russia
- Region: Adygea
- District: Maykopsky District
- Time zone: UTC+3:00

Sevastopolskaya (Russian: Севастопольская) is a rural locality (a stanitsa) in Abadzekhskoye Rural Settlement of Maykopsky District, Russia. The population was 608 as of 2018. There are 13 streets.

== Geography ==
The stanitsa is located in the upper reaches of the river Fyuntv, 27 km southeast of Tulsky (the district's administrative centre) by road. Novosvobodnaya is the nearest rural locality.
