= Chikalov =

Chikalov Чикалов
- Khutor
- Location within Republic of Adygea Location within Russia
- Coordinates: 44°57′N 39°57′E
- Country: Russia
- Region: Adygea
- District: Shovgenovsky District
- Time zone: UTC+3:00

Chikalov (Russian: Чикалов) is a rural locality (a khutor) in Dukmasovskoye Rural Settlement of Shovgenovsky District, the Republic of Adygea, Russia. The population was 118 as of 2018. There are three streets.

== Geography ==
Chikalov is located 32 km (20 mi) west of Khakurinokhabl (the district's administrative centre) by road. Pentyukhov is the nearest rural locality.
