= Mamkheg =

Mamkheg Мамхег Мамхыгъ
- Aul
- Location within Republic of Adygea Location within Russia
- Coordinates: 45°00′N 40°13′E
- Country: Russia
- Region: Adygea
- District: Shovgenovsky District
- Time zone: UTC+3:00

Mamkheg (Russian: Мамхег; Adyghe: Мамхыгъ) is a rural locality (an aul) and the administrative center of Mamkhegskoye Rural Settlement of Shovgenovsky District, the Republic of Adygea, Russia. The population was 1985 as of 2018. There are 24 streets.

== Geography ==
Mamkheg is located on the bank of the Fars River, 3 km (1.9 mi) southwest of Khakurinokhabl (the district's administrative centre) by road. Khakurinokhabl is the nearest rural locality.

== Ethnicity ==
The aul is inhabited by Circassians of the Mamkhegh tribe, after whom the village is named.
