= Dyakov =

Dyakov (masculine; Russian: Дьяков; Bulgarian: Дяков) or Dyakova (feminine) is a masculine surname derived from the occupation of dyak (clerk).

== People ==
- Bogomil Dyakov, Bulgarian soccer player
- Dumitru Diacov, Moldovan politician of Russian ethnicity
- Iliya Dyakov, Bulgarian soccer player
- Kostadin Dyakov, Bulgarian soccer player
- Svetoslav Dyakov, Bulgarian soccer player
- Tanko Dyakov, Bulgarian soccer player
- Viktoriya Dyakova (born 1993), Ukrainian archer
- Vitali Dyakov, Russian soccer player

== Place ==
- Dyakov (rural locality), a rural locality (a khutor) in Maykopsky District of the Republic of Adygea, Russia
