= Bezvodnaya, Republic of Adygea =

Bezvodnaya Безводная Псынчъэ
- Stanitsa
- Location within Republic of Adygea Location within Russia
- Coordinates: 44°22′N 39°54′E
- Country: Russia
- Region: Adygea
- District: Maykopsky District
- Time zone: UTC+3:00

Bezvodnaya (Russian: Безводная; Adyghe: Псынчъэ, Psynĉə) is a rural locality (a stanitsa) in Krasnooktyabrskoye Rural Settlement of Maykopsky District, Russia. The population was 67 as of 2018. There are 7 streets.

== Geography ==
The stanitsa is located on the Bezvodnaya River, 42 km southwest of Tulsky (the district's administrative centre) by road. Krasny Dagestan is the nearest rural locality.

== Ethnicity ==
The stanitsa is inhabited by Russians.
