= Yekaterinovsky (rural locality) =

Yekaterinovsky (Russian: Екатери́новский; masculine), Yekaterinovskaya (Екатери́новская; feminine), or Yekaterinovskoye (Екатери́новское; neuter) is the name of several rural localities in Russia:

- Yekaterinovsky, Adygea, a khutor in Giaginsky District of the Republic of Adygea
- Yekaterinovsky, Krasnodar Krai, a khutor in Fedorovsky Rural Okrug of Abinsky District of Krasnodar Krai
- Yekaterinovsky, Saratov Oblast, a settlement in Kalininsky District of Saratov Oblast
- Yekaterinovsky, Stavropol Krai, a khutor in Zavetnensky Selsoviet of Kochubeyevsky District of Stavropol Krai
