= Pshizov =

Pshizov Пшизов Пщыжъхьабл
- Aul
- Location within Republic of Adygea Location within Russia
- Coordinates: 45°05′N 40°06′E
- Country: Russia
- Region: Adygea
- District: Shovgenovsky District
- Time zone: UTC+3:00

Pshizov (Russian: Пшизов; Adyghe: Пщыжъхьабл) is a rural locality (an aul) in Khatazhukayskoye Rural Settlement of Shovgenovsky District, the Republic of Adygea, Russia. The population was 845 as of 2018. There are 20 streets.

== Geography ==
Pshizov is located south of the Laba River, 15 km (9.3 mi) northwest of Khakurinokhabl (the district's administrative centre) by road. Vesyoly is the nearest rural locality.

== Ethnicity ==
The aul is inhabited by Circassians.
