= Prichtovsky =

Prichtovsky Причтовский
- Khutor
- Location within Republic of Adygea Location within Russia
- Coordinates: 44°31′N 40°08′E
- Country: Russia
- Region: Adygea
- District: Maykopsky District
- Time zone: UTC+3:00

Prichtovsky (Russian: Причтовский) is a rural locality (a khutor) in Pobedenskoye Rural Settlement of Maykopsky District, Russia. The population was 415 as of 2018. There are 11 streets.

== Geography ==
Prichtovsky is located 8 km northwest of Tulsky (the district's administrative centre) by road. Shaumyan is the nearest rural locality.
