= Makhoshepolyana =

Makhoshepolyana Махошеполяна
- Village
- Location within Republic of Adygea Location within Russia
- Coordinates: 44°27′N 40°17′E
- Country: Russia
- Region: Adygea
- District: Maykopsky District
- Time zone: UTC+3:00

Makhoshepolyana (Russian: Махошеполяна) is a rural locality (a selo) in Tulskoye Rural Settlement of Maykopsky District, Russia. The population was 6 as of 2018. There is 1 street.

== Geography ==
Makhoshepolyana is located 18 km southeast of Tulsky (the district's administrative centre) by road. Tulsky is the nearest rural locality.

== Ethnicity ==
The village is inhabited by Armenians and Mari.
