= Mikhaylov, Republic of Adygea =

Mikhaylov Михайлов
- Khutor
- Location within Republic of Adygea Location within Russia
- Coordinates: 44°58′N 40°09′E
- Country: Russia
- Region: Adygea
- District: Shovgenovsky District
- Time zone: UTC+3:00

Mikhaylov (Russian: Михайлов) is a rural locality (a khutor) in Zarevskoye Rural Settlement of Shovgenovsky District, the Republic of Adygea, Russia. The population reported was 76 as of 2018. There are three streets.

== Geography ==
Mikhaylov is located 11 km (6.8 mi) southwest of Khakurinokhabl (the district's administrative centre) by road. Zadunayevsky is the nearest rural locality.
