= Volny (village) =

Volny Вольный Шъхьафит
- Khutor
- Location within Republic of Adygea Location within Russia
- Coordinates: 44°40′N 40°11′E
- Country: Russia
- Region: Adygea
- District: Maykopsky District
- Time zone: UTC+3:00

Volny (Russian: Вольный; Adyghe: Шъхьафит, Ŝḥafit) is a rural locality (a khutor) in Krasnoulskoye Rural Settlement of Maykopsky District, Russia. The population was 268 as of 2018. There are 3 streets.

== Geography ==
Volny is located 30 km north of Tulsky (the district's administrative centre) by road. Krasnaya Ulka is the nearest rural locality.
