= Mirny, Maykopsky District, Republic of Adygea =

Mirny Мирный Мамыр
- Settlement
- Location within Republic of Adygea Location within Russia
- Coordinates: 44°32′N 39°57′E
- Country: Russia
- Region: Adygea
- District: Maykopsky District
- Time zone: UTC+3:00

Mirny (Russian: Мирный; Adyghe: Мамыр) is a rural locality (a settlement) in Krasnooktyabrskoye Rural Settlement of Maykopsky District, Russia. The population was 17 as of 2018. There are 2 streets.

== Geography ==
Mirny is located 26 km west of Tulsky (the district's administrative centre) by road. Prirechny is the nearest rural locality.
