= Serhiy Teryokhin =

Ukrainian politician

- Сергій Терьохін
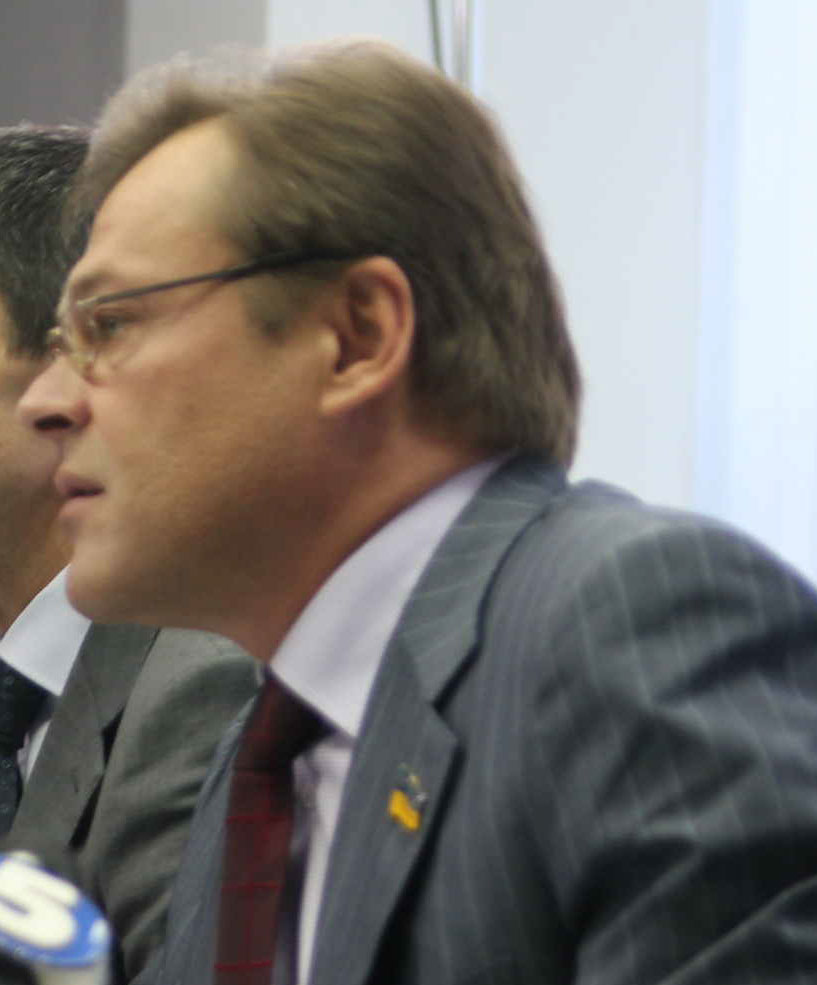
- Teryokhin in 2012

Minister of Economy of Ukraine
- In office 4 February 2005 – 27 September 2005
- Prime Minister: Yulia Tymoshenko
- Preceded by: Mykola Derkach
- Succeeded by: Arseniy Yatsenyuk

Personal details
- Born: 29 September 1963 (age 63) Kyiv, Ukrainian SSR
- Party: Batkivshchyna
- Spouse: Svitlana (1967)
- Children: son Kyrylo (1988) daughter Daryna (2003)
- Education: Taras Shevchenko National University of Kyiv

Serhiy Anatolіyovich Terokhin (Ukrainian: Сергій Анатолійович Терьохін) is a Ukrainian economist and politician. MP of Ukraine. Minister of Economy of Ukraine from 4 February to 27 September 2005. Batkivshchyna Party member.
