= Krasnaya Ulka =

Krasnaya Ulka Красная Улька Улэжъые Плъыжь
- Khutor
- Location within Republic of Adygea Location within Russia
- Coordinates: 44°41′N 40°10′E
- Country: Russia
- Region: Adygea
- District: Maykopsky District
- Time zone: UTC+3:00

Krasnaya Ulka (Russian: Красная Улька; Adyghe: Улэжъые Плъыжь, Uləẑye Ptlyź) is a rural locality (a khutor) and the administrative center of Krasnoulskoye Rural Settlement of Maykopsky District, Russia. The population was 401 as of 2018. There are 6 streets.

== Geography ==
Krasnaya Ulka is located 28 km north of Tulsky (the district's administrative centre) by road. Volny is the nearest rural locality.
