= Khamyshki =

Khamyshki Хамышки Хъымыщкӏэй
- Village
- Location within Republic of Adygea Location within Russia
- Coordinates: 44°05′N 40°07′E
- Country: Russia
- Region: Adygea
- District: Maykopsky District
- Time zone: UTC+3:00

Khamyshki (Russian: Хамышки; Adyghe: Хъымыщкӏэй) is a rural locality (a selo) in Dakhovskoye Rural Settlement of Maykopsky District, the Republic of Adygea, Russia. The population was 297 as of 2018. There are 22 streets.

== Geography ==
The village is located in the valley of the Belaya River, 57 km south of Tulsky (the district's administrative centre) by road. Dakhovskaya is the nearest rural locality.
