= Kabekhabl =

Kabekhabl Кабехабль Къэбэхьабл
- Aul
- Location within Republic of Adygea Location within Russia
- Coordinates: 45°03′N 40°10′E
- Country: Russia
- Region: Adygea
- District: Shovgenovsky District
- Time zone: UTC+3:00

Kabekhabl (Russian: Кабехабль; Adyghe: Къэбэхьабл) is a rural locality (an aul) in Khatazhukayskoye Rural Settlement of Shovgenovsky District, the Republic of Adygea, Russia. The population was 1,015 as of 2018. There are 14 streets.

== Geography ==
Kabekhabl is in the steppe zone, on the left bank of the Fars River, 8 km (5.0 mi) northwest of Khakurinokhabl (the district's administrative centre) by road. Pshicho is the nearest rural locality.

== Ethnicity ==
The aul is inhabited by Circassians.
