= Merkulayevka =

Merkulayevka Меркулаевка
- Settlement
- Location within Republic of Adygea Location within Russia
- Coordinates: 44°09′N 40°14′E
- Country: Russia
- Region: Adygea
- District: Maykopsky District
- Time zone: UTC+3:00

Merkulayevka (Russian: Меркулаевка) is a rural locality (a settlement) in Dakhovskoye Rural Settlement of Maykopsky District, Russia. The population was 52 as of 2018. There are 3 streets.

== Geography ==
The settlement is located in the valley of the Merkulayevka River, 47 km south of Tulsky (the district's administrative centre) by road. Novoprokhladnoye is the nearest rural locality.
