= Novorusov =

Novorusov Новорусов
- Khutor
- Location within Republic of Adygea Location within Russia
- Coordinates: 44°59′N 40°08′E
- Country: Russia
- Region: Adygea
- District: Shovgenovsky District
- Time zone: UTC+3:00

Novorusov (Russian: Новорусов) is a rural locality (a khutor) in Zarevskoye Rural Settlement of Shovgenovsky District, the Republic of Adygea, Russia. The population was 95 as of 2018. There is one street.

== Geography ==
Novorusov is located 9 km (5.6 mi) southwest of Khakurinokhabl (the district's administrative centre) by road. Mikhaylov is the nearest rural locality.
