= Novoprokhladnoe =

Novoprokhladnoe Новопрохладное
- Village
- Location within Republic of Adygea Location within Russia
- Coordinates: 44°08′N 40°17′E
- Country: Russia
- Region: Adygea
- District: Maykopsky District
- Time zone: UTC+3:00

Novoprokhladnoe (Russian: Новопрохладное) is a rural locality (a selo) in Dakhovskoye Rural Settlement of Maykopsky District, Russia. The population was 119 as of 2018. There are 5 streets.

== Geography ==
The village is located in the valley of the Sakhray River, 54 km south of Tulsky (the district's administrative centre) by road. Merkulayevka is the nearest rural locality.
