= Oktyabrsky, Republic of Adygea =

Oktyabrsky Октябрьский Чъэпогъу
- Khutor
- Location within Republic of Adygea Location within Russia
- Coordinates: 44°38′N 40°13′E
- Country: Russia
- Region: Adygea
- District: Maykopsky District
- Time zone: UTC+3:00

Oktyabrsky (Russian: Октябрьский; Adyghe: Чъэпогъу) is a rural locality (a khutor) in Kirovskoye Rural Settlement of Maykopsky District, Russia. The population was 52 as of 2018. There are 2 streets.

== Geography ==
Oktyabrsky is located 21 km north of Tulsky (the district's administrative centre) by road. Grozny is the nearest rural locality.
