= Tkachyov (village) =

Tkachyov Ткачёв
- Khutor
- Location within Republic of Adygea Location within Russia
- Coordinates: 44°43′N 40°12′E
- Country: Russia
- Region: Adygea
- District: Maykopsky District
- Time zone: UTC+3:00

Tkachyov (Russian: Ткачёв) is a rural locality (a khutor) in Krasnoulskoye Rural Settlement of Maykopsky District, Russia. The population was 207 as of 2018. There is 1 street.

== Geography ==
Tkachyov is located 31 km north of Tulsky (the district's administrative centre) by road. Komintern is the nearest rural locality.
