= Grozny (disambiguation) =

Grozny is the capital city of the Chechen Republic, Russia.

Grozny (masculine), Groznaya (feminine), or Groznoye (neuter) may also refer to:

- Ivan the Terrible (Grozny) (1530–1584), Grand Prince of Moscow (1533–1547) and the Tsar of Russia (1547–1584)
- Grozny Group, a volcano on the Kuril Islands, Russia
- Grozny Urban Okrug, a municipal formation which the city of republic significance of Grozny in the Chechen Republic, Russia is incorporated as
- Grozny (inhabited locality) (Groznaya, Groznoye), several inhabited localities in Russia
- Groznoye, former name of Amanbaev, a village in Kyrgyzstan
- Soviet destroyer Grozny (1936), a Gnevny-class destroyer
- Grozny (horse), a Peruvian racehorse
