= Shaumyan, Republic of Adygea =

Shaumyan Шаумян
- Khutor
- Location within Republic of Adygea Location within Russia
- Coordinates: 44°31′N 40°08′E
- Country: Russia
- Region: Adygea
- District: Maykopsky District
- Time zone: UTC+3:00

Shaumyan (Russian: Шаумян) is a rural locality (a khutor) in Pobedenskoye Rural Settlement of Maykopsky District, the Republic of Adygea, Russia. The population was 386 as of 2018. There are 4 streets.

== Geography ==
Shaumyan is located 9 km northwest of Tulsky (the district's administrative centre) by road. Prichtovsky is the nearest rural locality.
