= Kirov, Republic of Adygea =

Kirov Киров
- Khutor
- Location within Republic of Adygea Location within Russia
- Coordinates: 45°05′N 40°15′E
- Country: Russia
- Region: Adygea
- District: Shovgenovsky District
- Time zone: UTC+3:00

Kirov (Russian: Киров) is a rural locality (a khutor) in Khakurinokhablskoye Rural Settlement of Shovgenovsky District, the Republic of Adygea, Russia. The population was 100 as of 2018. There are six streets.

== Geography ==
Kirov is located 16 km (9.9 mi) northeast of Khakurinokhabl (the district's administrative centre) by road. Temirgoyevskaya is the nearest rural locality.
