= Tsvetochny, Republic of Adygea =

Tsvetochny Цветочный
- Settlement
- Location within Republic of Adygea Location within Russia
- Coordinates: 44°29′N 40°08′E
- Country: Russia
- Region: Adygea
- District: Maykopsky District
- Time zone: UTC+3:00

Tsvetochny (Russian: Цветочный) is a rural locality (a settlement) in Timiryazevskoye Rural Settlement of Maykopsky District, the Republic of Adygea, Russia. The population was 1,388 as of 2018. There are 18 streets.

== Geography ==
Tsvetochny is located 6 km southwest of Tulsky (the district's administrative centre) by road. Tulskaya is the nearest rural locality.
