= Komintern, Republic of Adygea =

Komintern Коминтерн
- Khutor
- Location within Republic of Adygea Location within Russia
- Coordinates: 44°42′N 40°11′E
- Country: Russia
- Region: Adygea
- District: Maykopsky District
- Time zone: UTC+3:00

Komintern (Russian: Коминтерн) is a rural locality (a khutor) in Krasnoulskoye Rural Settlement of Maykopsky District, Russia. The population was 283 as of 2018. There are 2 streets.

== Geography ==
Komintern is located 29 km north of Tulsky (the district's administrative centre) by road. Krasnaya Ulka is the nearest rural locality.
