= Krasnooktyabrsky, Republic of Adygea =

Krasnooktyabrsky Краснооктябрьский Октябрэплъыжь
- Settlement
- Location within Republic of Adygea Location within Russia
- Coordinates: 44°34′N 40°04′E
- Country: Russia
- Region: Adygea
- District: Maykopsky District
- Time zone: UTC+3:00

Krasnooktyabrsky (Russian: Краснооктябрьский; Adyghe: Октябрэплъыжь, Oktjabrəptlyź) is a rural locality (a settlement) and the administrative center of Krasnooktyabrskoye Rural Settlement of Maykopsky District, Russia. The population was 6536 as of 2018. There are 69 streets.

== Geography ==
Krasnooktyabrsky is located 14 km northwest of Tulsky (the district's administrative centre) by road. Prirechny is the nearest rural locality.
