= Proletarsky, Republic of Adygea =

Proletarsky Пролетарский Ермэл
- Khutor
- Location within Republic of Adygea Location within Russia
- Coordinates: 44°37′N 40°10′E
- Country: Russia
- Region: Adygea
- District: Maykopsky District
- Time zone: UTC+3:00

Proletarsky (Russian: Пролетарский; Adyghe: Ермэл) is a rural locality (a khutor) in Kirovskoye Rural Settlement of Maykopsky District, Russia. The population was 1064 as of 2018. There are 10 streets.

== Geography ==
Proletarsky is located 17 km north of Tulsky (the district's administrative centre) by road. Mafekhabl is the nearest rural locality.
