= Kelemetov =

Kelemetov Келеметов
- Khutor
- Location within Republic of Adygea Location within Russia
- Coordinates: 44°57′N 40°06′E
- Country: Russia
- Region: Adygea
- District: Shovgenovsky District
- Time zone: UTC+3:00

Kelemetov (Russian: Келеметов) is a rural locality (a khutor) in Zarevskoye Rural Settlement of Shovgenovsky District, the Republic of Adygea, Russia. The population was 29 as of 2018. There are two streets.

== Geography ==
Kelemetov is located 19 km (12 mi) southwest of Khakurinokhabl (the district's administrative centre) by road. Zarevo is the nearest rural locality.
