= Timiryazeva =

Timiryazeva Тимирязева
- Settlement
- Location within Republic of Adygea Location within Russia
- Coordinates: 44°28′N 40°10′E
- Country: Russia
- Region: Adygea
- District: Maykopsky District
- Time zone: UTC+3:00

Timiryazeva (Russian: Тимирязева) is a rural locality (a settlement) and the administrative center of Timiryazevskoye Rural Settlement of Maykopsky District, Russia. The population was 1163 as of 2018. There are 6 streets.

== Geography ==
Timiryazeva is located 8 km south of Tulsky (the district's administrative centre) by road. Michurina is the nearest rural locality.
