= Shuntuk =

Shuntuk Шунтук
- Khutor
- Location within Republic of Adygea Location within Russia
- Coordinates: 44°27′N 40°10′E
- Country: Russia
- Region: Adygea
- District: Maykopsky District
- Time zone: UTC+3:00

Shuntuk (Russian: Шунтук) is a rural locality (a khutor) in Timiryazevskoye Rural Settlement of Maykopsky District, the Republic of Adygea, Russia. The population was 919 as of 2018. There are 15 streets.

== Geography ==
Shuntuk is located 9 km south of Tulsky (the district's administrative centre) by road. Podgorny is the nearest rural locality.
