= Ust-Sakhray =

Ust-Sakhray Усть-Сахрай
- Settlement
- Location within Republic of Adygea Location within Russia
- Coordinates: 44°12′N 40°16′E
- Country: Russia
- Region: Adygea
- District: Maykopsky District
- Time zone: UTC+3:00

Ust-Sakhray (Russian: Усть-Сахрай) is a rural locality (a settlement) in Dakhovskoye Rural Settlement of Maykopsky District, the Republic of Adygea, Russia. The population was 297 as of 2018. There are 6 streets.

== Geography ==
The settlement is located near the confluence of the rivers Dakh and Sahrai, 43 km south of Tulsky (the district's administrative centre) by road. Dakhovskaya is the nearest rural locality.
