= Vesyoly, Shovgenovsky District, Republic of Adygea =

Vesyoly Весёлый
- Khutor
- Location within Republic of Adygea Location within Russia
- Coordinates: 45°03′N 40°03′E
- Country: Russia
- Region: Adygea
- District: Shovgenovsky District
- Time zone: UTC+3:00

Vesyoly (Russian: Весёлый) is a rural locality (a khutor) in Zarevskoye Rural Settlement of Shovgenovsky District, the Republic of Adygea, Russia. The population was 249 as of 2018. There are three streets.

== Geography ==
Vesyoly is located 23 km (14 mi) southeast of Khakurinokhabl (the district's administrative centre) by road. Chernyshyov is the nearest rural locality.
