= Mamkhegh =

Circassian tribe

The Mamkhegh or Mamheg (Adyghe: Мамхыгъ Mamxığ or Мамхэгъ Mamxeğ; Russian: Мамхеги Mamxegi) were one of the twelve major Circassian tribes, representing one of the twelve stars on the green-and-gold Circassian flag.

Originally, the Mamkhegs lived in the territory between the Belaja and Kurdžips Rivers, in the territory of modern Majkop and environs in the Russian republics of Adygea and Krasnodar Krai. Due to the Caucasian War, the Mamkheghs were forced to leave their territories in the expulsion of the Circassians. Most of the survivors left for the Ottoman Empire. Those who remained took Russian citizenship and founded a village called Mamxeg, which survives today in the Shovgenovsky District of modern Adygea.

== History ==
Legends say that they moved from the Black Sea coast to the upper reaches of the Pšexa River. At first, Mamkhegs were just three big families: Shnah, Mami, and Tlizhho. When the population significantly increased (naturally and after immigration from Abadzeh lands) they moved to a territory between the Belaja and Kurdžips Rivers near modern Majkop, where they remained till 1862 and formed about 16 villages. According to most historians, the number of Mamkheghs in the middle of the 19th century was about 3,500 people. Yet some sources indicate that they were about 15,000 people.

Aleksandr D′jačkov-Tarasov (А.Н. Дьячков-Тарасов) reported the following Mamkhegh villages in the 19th century:

- Tlevceževy (Тлевцежевы)- on the Kubiok River, a tributary of the White;
- Patukay (Патукай)- six versts from Majkop on the Kuro River;
- Duxxabl′ (Духхабль)- less than a verst from the above on the Kurdžips River;
- Hačemzy (Хачемзий)- on the site of the present village of Tula River;
- Dačehabl′ (Дачехабль)- between Kurdžips and Belaja Rivers;
- Kural′ (Кураль)- central village mamhegov, on the watershed between the Belaja and Kurdžips.

Other villages recorded were: Xoretli (Хоретли), Bardžukaj (Барджукай), Badženaj (Бадженай), Uordane (Уордане), Kujže (Куйже), Tag″anaj (Тагъанай), and Xakunaj (Хакунай).

After a pogrom in 1823, however, the number of villages dramatically decreased as many Mamkheghs sought refuge among Abadzekhs.

Due to the Caucasian War, the Mamkheghs were forced to leave their territories in the expulsion of the Circassians. The majority of the survivors left for the Ottoman Empire. The remaining Mamkheghs took Russian citizenship and founded a village called Mamxeg in the lower part of Fars River (in the Kuban Oblast). Another group of Mamkheghs joined Circassian villages nearby. In 1884 1,258 Mamkheghs remained in the Kuban region of Russia composed people, 715 of them in Mamxeg village.

== Culture ==
The Mamkhegh spoke a special dialect of the Adyghe language, closest to that of the Temirgoy, yet in their traditions and lifestyle were the closest to that of the Abadzekh people. According to sources, the Mamkheghs had classes of nobles, freemen, servants and slaves. They did not, however, have the highest class of prince who usually controlled villages, like most Circassian tribes. Rural administration was in the hands of elected elders from the freemen class.

== See also ==
- Circassians#Tribes
- Shapsugs
- Bzhedug
- Abzakhs
- Zhaney
- Natukhai
- Temirgoy
- Hatuqwai
- Besleney
