= Karmir-Astkh =

Karmir-Astkh Кармир-Астх
- Khutor
- Location within Republic of Adygea Location within Russia
- Coordinates: 44°36′N 40°13′E
- Country: Russia
- Region: Adygea
- District: Maykopsky District
- Time zone: UTC+3:00

Karmir-Astkh (Russian: Кармир-Астх) is a rural locality (a khutor) in Kuzhorskoye Rural Settlement of Maykopsky District, in the Adygea Republic of Russia. The population was 26 as of 2018. There are 3 streets.

== Etymology ==
Karmir Astkh (Կարմիր Աստղ) means Red Star in Armenian.

== Geography ==
Karmir-Astkh is located 22 km northeast of Tulsky (the district's administrative centre) by road. 17 let Oktyabrya is the nearest rural locality.

== Ethnicity ==
The khutor is inhabited by Russians.
