= Dukmasov =

Dukmasov Дукмасов
- Khutor
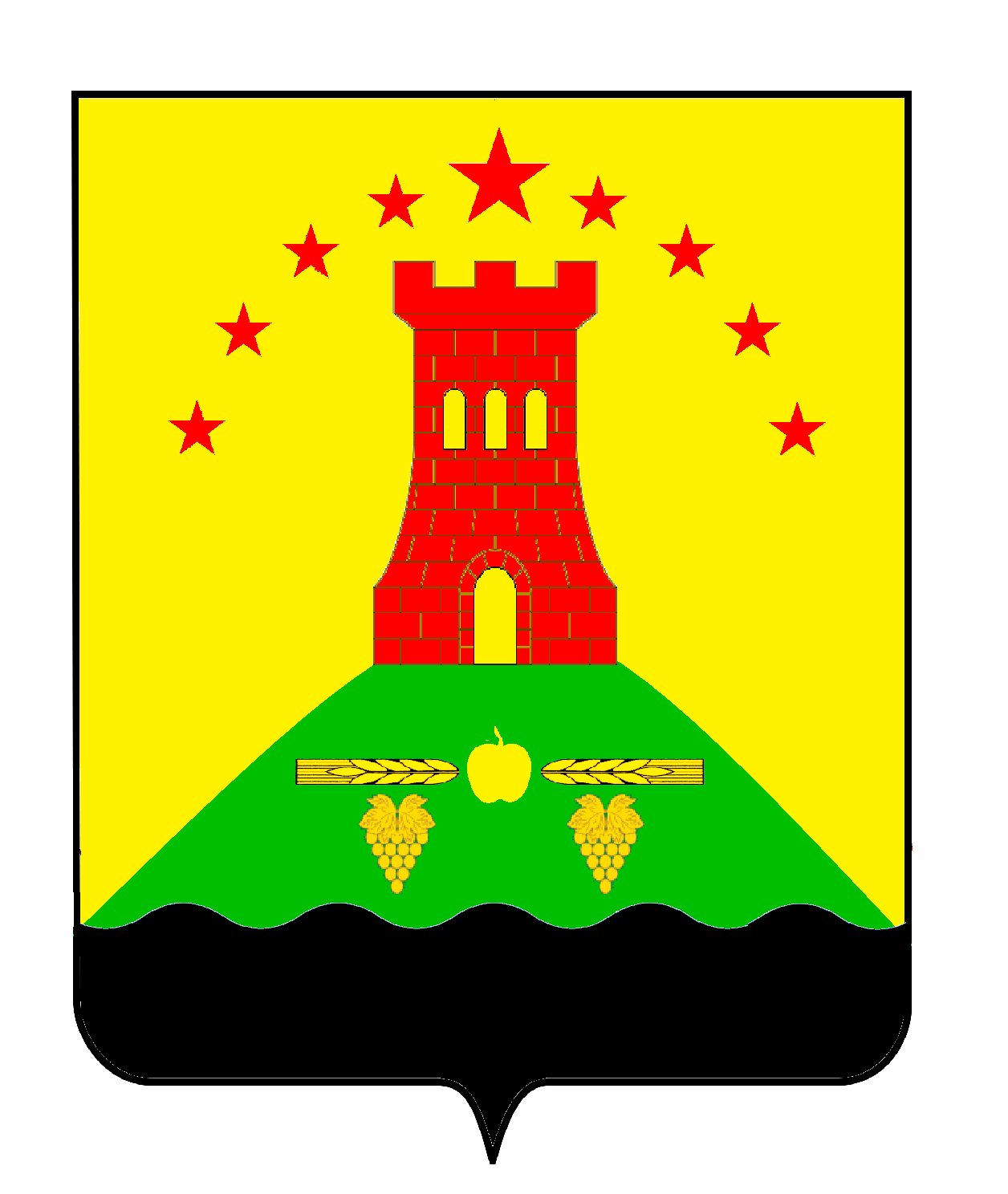
- Seal

- Location within Republic of Adygea Location within Russia
- Coordinates: 45°00′N 39°54′E
- Country: Russia
- Region: Adygea
- District: Shovgenovsky District
- Time zone: UTC+3:00

Dukmasov (Russian: Дукмасов) is a rural locality (a khutor) and the administrative center of Dukmasovskoye Rural Settlement of Shovgenovsky District, the Republic of Adygea, Russia. The population was 478 as of 2018. There are 12 streets.

== Geography ==
Dukmasov is located 29 km (18 mi) west of Khakurinokhabl (the district's administrative centre) by road. Mokronazarov is the nearest rural locality.
