= Spokoyny (settlement) =

Spokoyny Спокойный Гупсэф
- Settlement
- Location within Republic of Adygea Location within Russia
- Coordinates: 44°33′N 40°03′E
- Country: Russia
- Region: Adygea
- District: Maykopsky District
- Time zone: UTC+3:00

Spokoyny (Russian: Спокойный; Adyghe: Гупсэф) is a rural locality (a settlement) in Krasnooktyabrskoye Rural Settlement of Maykopsky District, Russia. The population was 38 as of 2010. There is one street.

== Geography ==
Spokoyny is located 18 km northwest of Tulsky (the district's administrative centre) by road. Prirechny is the nearest rural locality.
