= Tabachny =

Tabachny Табачный ТутыншӏапI
- Settlement
- Location within Republic of Adygea Location within Russia
- Coordinates: 44°33′N 40°05′E
- Country: Russia
- Region: Adygea
- District: Maykopsky District
- Time zone: UTC+3:00

Tabachny (Russian: Табачный; Adyghe: ТутыншӏапI) is a rural locality (a settlement) in Krasnooktyabrskoye Rural Settlement of Maykopsky District, Russia. The population was 2008 as of 2018. There are 52 streets.

== Geography ==
Tabachny is located 16 km northwest of Tulsky (the district's administrative centre) by road. Sadovy is the nearest rural locality.
