= Tryokhrechny =

Tryokhrechny Трёхречный
- Khutor
- Location within Republic of Adygea Location within Russia
- Coordinates: 44°39′N 40°23′E
- Country: Russia
- Region: Adygea
- District: Maykopsky District
- Time zone: UTC+3:00

Tryokhrechny (Russian: Трёхречный) is a rural locality (a khutor) in Khuzhorskoye Rural Settlement of Maykopsky District, Russia. The population was 572 as of 2018. There are 11 streets.

== Geography ==
Tryokhrechny is located 37 km northeast of Tulsky (the district's administrative centre) by road. Kuzhorskaya is the nearest rural locality.
