= Sovetsky, Republic of Adygea =

Sovetsky Советский
- Khutor
- Location within Republic of Adygea Location within Russia
- Coordinates: 44°40′N 40°05′E
- Country: Russia
- Region: Adygea
- District: Maykopsky District
- Time zone: UTC+3:00

Sovetsky (Russian: Советский) is a rural locality (a khutor) in Kirovskoye Rural Settlement of Maykopsky District, Russia. The population was 517 as of 2018. There are 5 streets.

== Geography ==
Sovetsky is located 21 km north of Tulsky (the district's administrative centre) by road. Severny is the nearest rural locality.
