= Dagestanskaya =

Dagestanskaya Дагестанская Дэгъыстан
- Stanitsa
- Location within Republic of Adygea Location within Russia
- Coordinates: 44°22′N 40°01′E
- Country: Russia
- Region: Adygea
- District: Maykopsky District
- Time zone: UTC+3:00

Dagestanskaya (Russian: Дагестанская; Adyghe: Дэгъыстан, Dəġystan) is a rural locality (a stanitsa) in Krasnooktyabrskoye Rural Settlement of Maykopsky District, Russia. The population was 495 as of 2018. There are 19 streets.

== Geography ==
The stanitsa is located on the Kurdzhips River, 34 km southwest of Tulsky (the district's administrative centre) by road. Krasny Dagestan is the nearest rural locality.
