= Khapachev =

Khapachev Хапачев
- Khutor
- Location within Republic of Adygea Location within Russia
- Coordinates: 45°05′N 40°13′E
- Country: Russia
- Region: Adygea
- District: Shovgenovsky District
- Time zone: UTC+3:00

Khapachev (Russian: Хапачев) is a rural locality (a khutor) in Khakurinokhablskoye Rural Settlement of Shovgenovsky District, the Republic of Adygea, Russia. The population was 216 as of 2018. There are seven streets.

== Geography ==
Khapachev is located in the north of Adygea, 12 km (7.5 mi) north of Khakurinokhabl (the district's administrative centre) by road. Kirov is the nearest rural locality.

== Ethnicity ==
The khutor is inhabited by Russians, Tatars, Ukrainians and representatives of Dagestan peoples.
