= Udobny, Republic of Adygea =

Udobny Удобный
- Settlement
- Location within Republic of Adygea Location within Russia
- Coordinates: 44°33′N 40°09′E
- Country: Russia
- Region: Adygea
- District: Maykopsky District
- Time zone: UTC+3:00

Udobny (Russian: Удобный) is a rural locality (a settlement) in Pobedenskoye Rural Settlement of Maykopsky District, the Republic of Adygea, Russia. The population was 1443 as of 2018. There are 38 streets.

== Geography ==
The settlement is located between Maykop and Tulsky, 5 km north of Tulsky (the district's administrative centre) by road. Sovkhozny is the nearest rural locality.
