= Kuzhorskaya =

Kuzhorskaya Кужорская Хьаджэхъухьабл
- Stanitsa
- Location within Republic of Adygea Location within Russia
- Coordinates: 44°40′N 40°18′E
- Country: Russia
- Region: Adygea
- District: Maykopsky District
- Time zone: UTC+3:00

Kuzhorskaya (Russian: Кужорская; Adyghe: Хьаджэхъухьабл, Ḥadžəẋuḥabl) is a rural locality (a stanitsa) and the administrative center of Kuzhorskoye Rural Settlement of Maykopsky District, Russia. The population was 3578 as of 2018. There are 66 streets.

== Geography ==
The stanitsa is located 28 km northeast of Tulsky (the district's administrative centre) by road. Tryokhrechny is the nearest rural locality.
