= Zarevo, Russia =

Zarevo Зарево
- Settlement
- Location within Republic of Adygea Location within Russia
- Coordinates: 45°00′N 40°04′E
- Country: Russia
- Region: Adygea
- District: Shovgenovsky District
- Time zone: UTC+3:00

Zarevo (Russian: Зарево) is a rural locality (a settlement) and the administrative center of Zarevskoye Rural Settlement of Shovgenovsky District, the Republic of Adygea, Russia. The population was 979 as of 2018. There are 11 streets.

== Geography ==
Zarevo is located 14 km (8.7 mi) west of Khakurinokhabl (the district's administrative centre) by road. Doroshenko is the nearest rural locality.

== Ethnicity ==
The settlement is inhabited by Russians, Adygheans, Tatars and Armenians.
