= Krasny Most, Republic of Adygea =

Krasny Most Красный Мост Лъэмыдж Плъыжь
- Khutor
- Location within Republic of Adygea Location within Russia
- Coordinates: 44°32′N 40°06′E
- Country: Russia
- Region: Adygea
- District: Maykopsky District
- Time zone: UTC+3:00

Krasny Most (Russian: Красный Мост; Adyghe: Лъэмыдж Плъыжь, Tləmydž Ptlyź) is a rural locality (a khutor) in Krasnooktyabrskoye Rural Settlement of Maykopsky District, Russia. The population was 40 as of 2018. There are 3 streets.

== Geography ==
Krasny Most is located 13 km northwest of Tulsky (the district's administrative centre) by road. Sadovy is the nearest rural locality.
