= Podgorny, Maykopsky District, Republic of Adygea =

Podgorny Подгорный
- Settlement
- Location within Republic of Adygea Location within Russia
- Coordinates: 44°27′N 40°10′E
- Country: Russia
- Region: Adygea
- District: Maykopsky District
- Time zone: UTC+3:00

Podgorny (Russian: Подгорный) is a rural locality (a settlement) in Timiryazevskoye Rural Settlement of Maykopsky District, Russia. The population was 117 as of 2018. There is 1 street.

== Geography ==
Podgorny is located 8 km south of Tulsky (the district's administrative centre) by road. Shuntuk is the nearest rural locality.
