= Chernyshev (rural locality) =

Chernyshev Чернышев
- Khutor
- Location within Republic of Adygea Location within Russia
- Coordinates: 45°02′N 40°02′E
- Country: Russia
- Region: Adygea
- District: Shovgenovsky District
- Time zone: UTC+3:00

Chernyshev (Russian: Чернышев) is a rural locality (a khutor) in Zarevskoye Rural Settlement of Shovgenovsky District, the Republic of Adygea, Russia. The population was 763 as of 2018. There are nine streets.

== Geography ==
Chernyshev is located 22 km (14 mi) west of Khakurinokhabl (the district's administrative centre) by road. Vesyoly is the nearest rural locality.

== Ethnicity ==
Chernyshev is inhabited by Russians and Ukrainians.
