= Vesyoly, Abadzekhskoye Rural Settlement, Maykopsky District, Republic of Adygea =

Vesyoly Весёлый
- Khutor
- Location within Republic of Adygea Location within Russia
- Coordinates: 44°24′N 40°11′E
- Country: Russia
- Region: Adygea
- District: Maykopsky District
- Time zone: UTC+3:00

Vesyoly (Russian: Весёлый) is a rural locality (a khutor) in Abadzekhskoye Rural Settlement of Maykopsky District, Russia. The population was 303 as of 2018.
