= Kamennomostsky =

Place in Adygea, Russia

Coordinates: 44°18′N 40°14′E

Kamennomostsky (Russian: Каменномо́стский; lit. stone bridge; Adyghe: Хьаджэкъо, Ḥadžəqo), also known as Khadzhokh (Хаджо́х) is a rural locality (a settlement) in Maykopsky District of the Republic of Adygea, Russia, located on the Belaya River 40 kilometers (25 mi) south of Maykop. Population: 7,213 (2010 census); 7,580 (2002 census); 8,292 (1989 Soviet census).

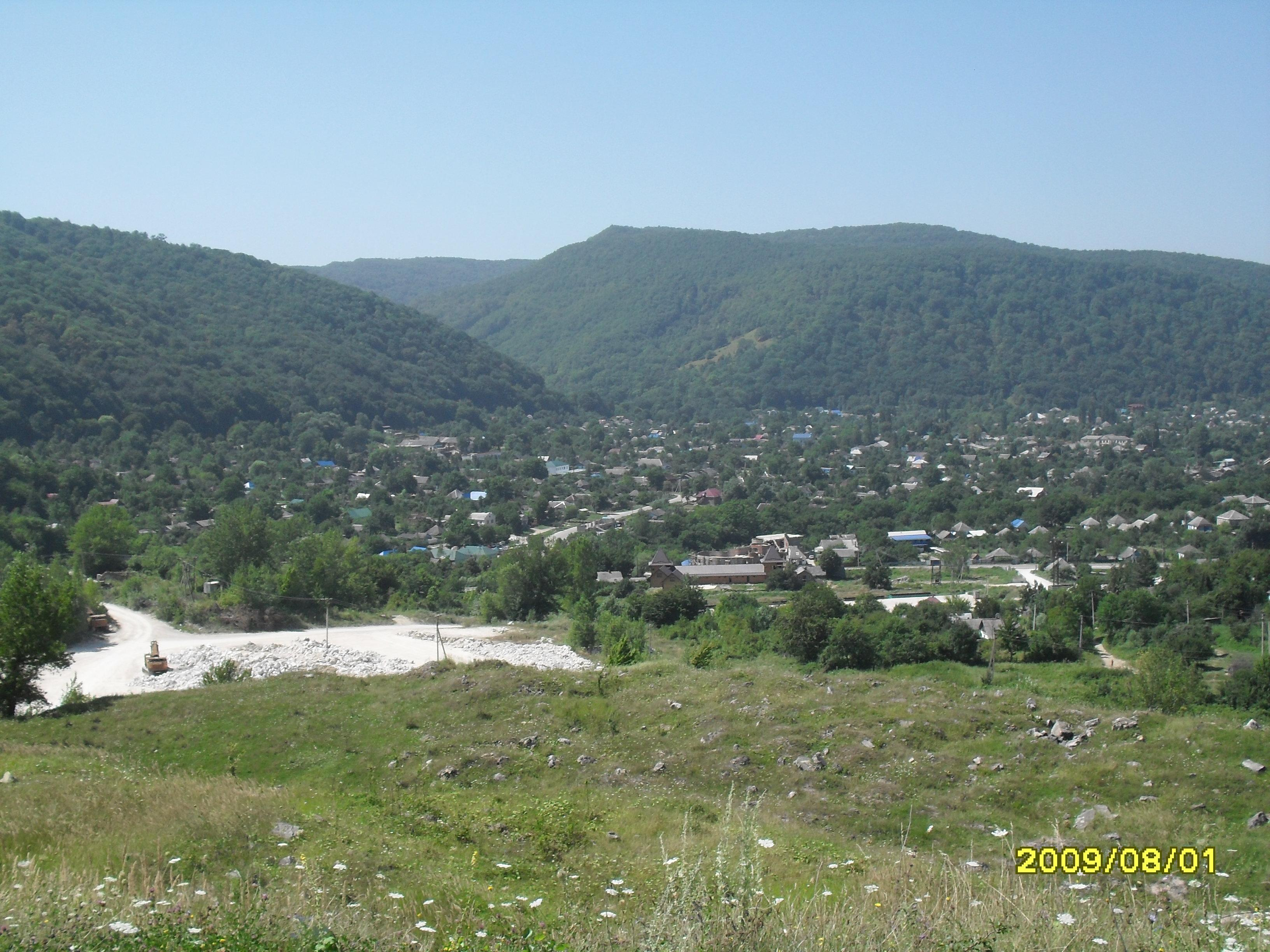

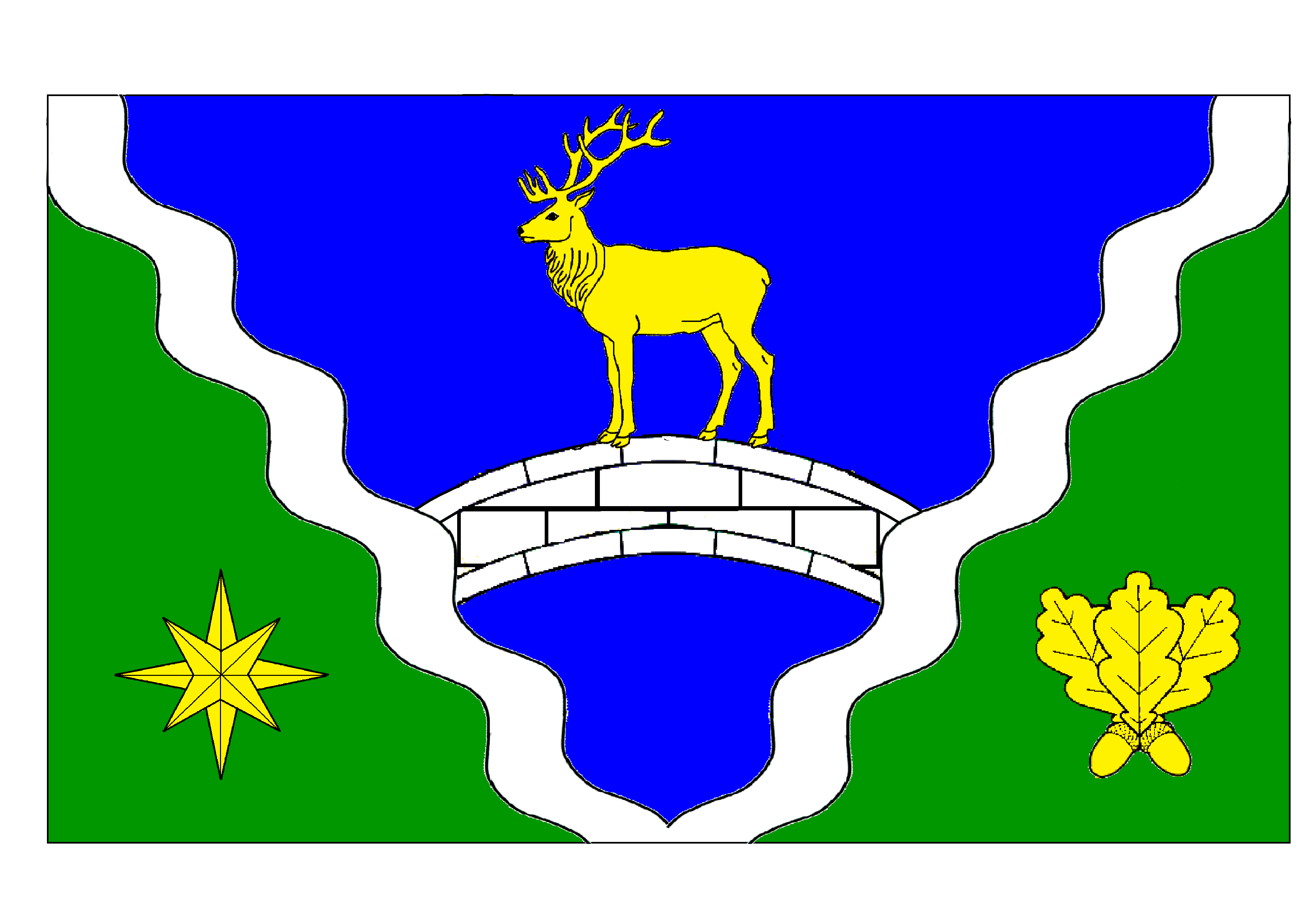
Flag of Kamennomostsky

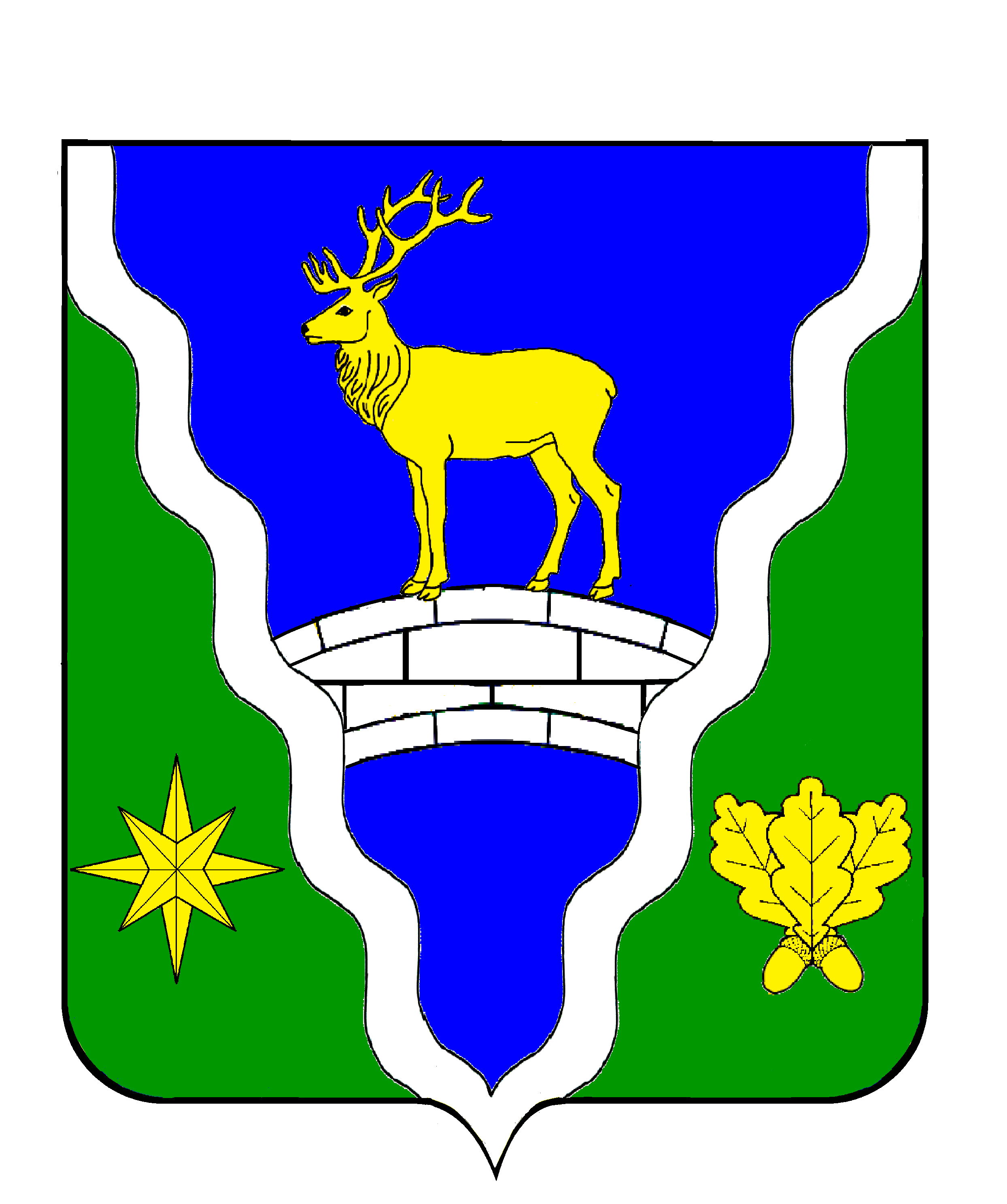
Coat of arms of Kamennomostsky

An Adyghe aul, famous for its prolonged resistance against Russian rule in the Caucasian War of 1817–1864, was located on the territory of this settlement. In 1862, a Cossack outpost was built in place of the ravaged aul, which later grew into the stanitsa of Kamennomostskaya (Каменномостская). The stanitsa was granted urban-type settlement status in 1948 but was demoted to rural locality on March 10, 2011.

Khadzhokh canyon (Хаджохская теснина), which is 45 meters (148 ft) deep but only 3 meters (9.8 ft) wide, is located on the Belaya River near the settlement. The modern name of the settlement is after a collapsed rock that forms a natural bridge across the canyon.
