= Dyakov (rural locality) =

Dyakov Дьяков
- Khutor
- Location within Republic of Adygea Location within Russia
- Coordinates: 44°39′N 40°08′E
- Country: Russia
- Region: Adygea
- District: Maykopsky District
- Time zone: UTC+3:00

Dyakov (Russian: Дьяков) is a rural locality (a khutor) in Kirovskoye Rural Settlement of Maykopsky District, Russia. The population was 149 as of 2018. There are 2 streets.

== Geography ==
Dyakov is located 19 km north of Tulsky (the district's administrative centre) by road. Grazhdansky is the nearest rural locality.
