= Svobodny Trud, Amur Oblast =

Svobodny Trud Свободный Труд
- Selo
- Location within Amur Oblast Location within Russia
- Coordinates: 51°57′N 127°17′E
- Country: Russia
- Region: Amur Oblast
- District: Shimanovsky District
- Time zone: UTC+9:00

Svobodny Trud (Russian: Свободный Труд) is a rural locality (a selo) in Novogeorgiyevsky Selsoviet of Shimanovsky District, Amur Oblast, Russia. The population was 32 as of 2018. There are 5 streets.

== Geography ==
Svobodny Trud is located 33 km west of Shimanovsk (the district's administrative centre) by road. Novogeorgiyevka is the nearest rural locality.
