= Doroshenko (khutor) =

Doroshenko Дорошенко
- Khutor
- Location within Republic of Adygea Location within Russia
- Coordinates: 44°59′N 40°09′E
- Country: Russia
- Region: Adygea
- District: Shovgenovsky District
- Time zone: UTC+3:00

Doroshenko (Russian: Дорошенко) is a rural locality (a khutor) in Zarevskoye Rural Settlement of Shovgenovsky District, the Republic of Adygea, Russia. The population was 147 as of 2018. There are three streets.

== Geography ==
Doroshenko is located 7 km (4.3 mi) west of Khakurinokhabl (the district's administrative centre) by road. Leyboabazov is the nearest rural locality.
