= Sovkhozny, Republic of Adygea =

Sovkhozny Совхозный
- Settlement
- Location within Republic of Adygea Location within Russia
- Coordinates: 44°32′N 40°09′E
- Country: Russia
- Region: Adygea
- District: Maykopsky District
- Time zone: UTC+3:00

Sovkhozny (Russian: Совхозный) is a rural locality (a settlement) and the administrative center of Pobedenskoye Rural Settlement of Maykopsky District, Russia. The population was 1483 as of 2018. There are 29 streets.

== Geography ==
Sovkhozny is located 4 km north of Tulsky (the district's administrative centre) by road. Udobny is the nearest rural locality.
