= Semyono-Makarensky =

Semyono-Makarensky Семёно-Макаренский
- Khutor
- Location within Republic of Adygea Location within Russia
- Coordinates: 44°55′N 40°14′E
- Country: Russia
- Region: Adygea
- District: Shovgenovsky District
- Time zone: UTC+3:00

Semyono-Makarensky (Russian: Семёно-Макаренский) is a rural locality (a khutor) in Dzherokayskoye Rural Settlement of Shovgenovsky District, the Republic of Adygea, Russia. The population was 87 as of 2018. There are four streets.

== Geography ==
Semyono-Makarensky is located 21 km (13 mi) south of Khakurinokhabl (the district's administrative centre) by road. Volno-Vesyoly is the nearest rural locality.
