= Kalinin, Republic of Adygea =

Kalinin Калинин
- Khutor
- Location within Republic of Adygea Location within Russia
- Coordinates: 44°42′N 40°07′E
- Country: Russia
- Region: Adygea
- District: Maykopsky District
- Time zone: UTC+3:00

Kalinin (Russian: Калинин) is a rural locality (a khutor) in Krasnoulskoye Rural Settlement of Maykopsky District, Russia. The population was 275 as of 2018. There are 6 streets.

== Geography ==
Kalinin is located 25 km north of Tulsky (the district's administrative centre) by road. Grazhdansky is the nearest rural locality.
