= Nizhniy Ayryum =

Nizhniy Ayryum Нижний Айрюм Ычӏэгъ Арым
- Village
- Location within Republic of Adygea Location within Russia
- Coordinates: 44°54′N 40°11′E
- Country: Russia
- Region: Adygea
- District: Giaginsky District
- Time zone: UTC+3:00

Nizhniy Ayryum (Russian: Нижний Айрюм; Adyghe: Ычӏэгъ Арым) is a rural locality (a selo) in Ayryumovskoye Rural Settlement of Giaginsky District, Adygea, Russia. The population was 264 as of 2018. There are 4 streets.

== Geography ==
Nizhniy Ayryum is located 16 km east of Giaginskaya (the district's administrative centre) by road. Novy and Obraztsovoye are the nearest rural localities.
