= Udobnoye =

Udobnoye Удобное
- Selo
- Location within Amur Oblast Location within Russia
- Coordinates: 50°08′N 127°48′E
- Country: Russia
- Region: Amur Oblast
- District: Blagoveshchensky District
- Time zone: UTC+9:00

Udobnoye (Russian: Удобное) is a rural locality (a selo) in Gribsky Selsoviet of Blagoveshchensky District, Amur Oblast, Russia. The population was 121 as of 2018. There are 7 streets.

== Geography ==
Udobnoye is located 36 km southeast of Blagoveshchensk (the district's administrative centre) by road. Peredovoye is the nearest rural locality.
