= Grazhdansky, Republic of Adygea =

Grazhdansky Гражданский Гражданскэр
- Khutor
- Location within Republic of Adygea Location within Russia
- Coordinates: 44°41′N 40°08′E
- Country: Russia
- Region: Adygea
- District: Maykopsky District
- Time zone: UTC+3:00

Grazhdansky (Russian: Гражданский; Adyghe: Гражданскэр, Graždanskər) is a rural locality (a khutor) in Krasnoulskoye Rural Settlement of Maykopsky District, Russia. The population was 379 as of 2018. There are three streets.

== Geography ==
Grazhdansky is located 24 km (15 mi) north of Tulsky (the district's administrative centre) by road. Kalinin is the nearest rural locality.
