= Abadzekhskaya =

Abadzekhskaya Абадзехская
- Stanitsa
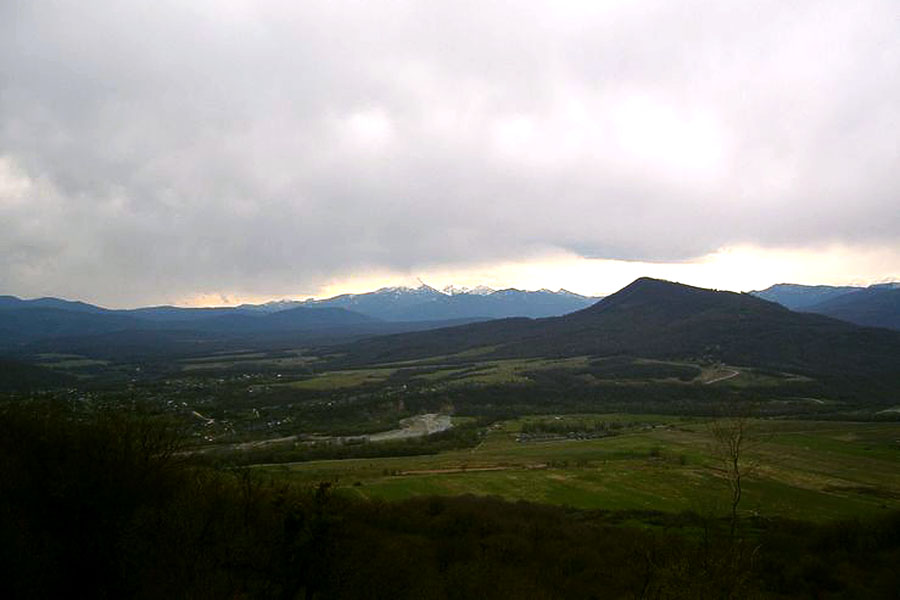
- Interactive map of Abadzekhskaya
- Location of Abadzekhskaya Abadzekhskaya (Republic of Adygea)
- Coordinates: 44°23′27″N 40°13′24″E
- Country: Russia
- Federal subject: Adygea
- Administrative district: Maykopsky District
- Founded: 1862
- Elevation: 350 m (1,150 ft)

Population (2010 Census)
  - Total: 3,623
  - Estimate (2024): 3,532 (−2.5%)
- Time zone: UTC+3 (MSK)
- Postal code: 385774
- OKTMO ID: 79622402101

Abadzekhskaya (Russian: Абадзехская, Adyghe: Абдзах, romanized: Abdzax) is a rural locality (a stanitsa) in Maykopsky District of the Republic of Adygea, Russia, located on the Belaya River 28 kilometers (17 mi) south of Maykop. Population: 3,623 (2010 census); 4,008 (2002 census).
