= Sovkhozny, Belgorod Oblast =

Sovkhozny Совхозный
- Settlement
- Location within Belgorod Oblast Location within Russia
- Coordinates: 50°28′N 35°52′E
- Country: Russia
- Region: Belgorod Oblast
- District: Grayvoronsky District
- Time zone: UTC+3:00

Sovkhozny (Russian: Совхозный) is a rural locality (a settlement) in Grayvoronsky District, Belgorod Oblast, Russia. The population was 90 as of 2010. There are 2 streets.

== Geography ==
Sovkhozny is located 25 km east of Grayvoron (the district's administrative centre) by road. Gorkovsky and Kazachok are the nearest rural localities.
