= Sadovoye, Astrakhan Oblast =

Sadovoye Садовое
- Selo
- Location within Astrakhan Oblast Location within Russia
- Coordinates: 48°28′N 45°33′E
- Country: Russia
- Region: Astrakhan Oblast
- District: Akhtubinsky District
- Time zone: UTC+4:00

Sadovoye (Russian: Садовое) is a rural locality (a selo) in Akhtubinsky District, Astrakhan Oblast, Russia. The population was 411 as of 2010. There is 1 street.

== Geography ==
Sadovoye is located 69 km northwest of Akhtubinsk (the district's administrative centre) by road. Grachi is the nearest rural locality.
