= Dakhovskaya =

Dakhovskaya Даховская Дахъо
- Stanitsa
- Location within Republic of Adygea Location within Russia
- Coordinates: 44°13′N 40°12′E
- Country: Russia
- Region: Adygea
- District: Maykopsky District
- Time zone: UTC+3:00

Dakhovskaya (Russian: Даховская; Adyghe: Дахъо, Daẋo) is a rural locality (a stanitsa) and the administrative center of Kuzhorskoye Rural Settlement of Maykopsky District, Russia. The population was 1363 as of 2018. There are 41 streets.

It was the site of executions and burials during the Civil War.

== Geography ==
The stanitsa is located on the right bank of the Belaya River, 36 km south of Tulsky (the district's administrative centre) by road. Ust-Sakhray is the nearest rural locality.
