= Sadovy, Timiryazevskoye Rural Settlement, Maykopsky District, Republic of Adygea =

Sadovy Садовый
- Settlement
- Location within Republic of Adygea Location within Russia
- Coordinates: 44°26′N 40°08′E
- Country: Russia
- Region: Adygea
- District: Maykopsky District
- Time zone: UTC+3:00

Sadovy (Russian: Садовый) is a rural locality (a settlement) in Timiryazevskoye Rural Settlement of Maykopsky District, Russia. The population was 160 in 2018. There is one street.

== Geography ==
Sadovy is located 11 kilometres (6.8 mi) southwest of Tulsky (the district's administrative centre) by road. Shuntuk is the nearest rural locality.
