= Dyukovo =

Dyukovo Дюково
- Village
- Location within Vologda Oblast Location within Russia
- Coordinates: 59°03′N 39°47′E
- Country: Russia
- Region: Vologda Oblast
- District: Vologodsky District
- Time zone: UTC+3:00

Dyukovo (Russian: Дюково) is a rural locality (a village) in Spasskoye Rural Settlement, Vologodsky District, Vologda Oblast, Russia. The population was 16 as of 2002. There are 3 streets.

== Geography ==
Dyukovo is located 22 km south of Vologda (the district's administrative centre) by road. Peryevo is the nearest rural locality.
