= Pobeda, Kamennomostskoye =

Pobeda Победа
- Settlement
- Location within Republic of Adygea Location within Russia
- Coordinates: 44°17′N 40°18′E
- Country: Russia
- Region: Adygea
- District: Maykopsky District
- Time zone: UTC+3:00

Pobeda (Russian: Победа) is a rural locality (a settlement) in Kamennomostskoye Rural Settlement of Maykopsky District, Russia. The population was 152 as of 2018.
