= Orekhov, Republic of Adygea =

Orekhov Орехов
- Khutor
- Location within Republic of Adygea Location within Russia
- Coordinates: 44°59′N 39°56′E
- Country: Russia
- Region: Adygea
- District: Shovgenovsky District
- Time zone: UTC+3:00

Orekhov (Russian: Оре́хов) is a rural locality (a khutor) in Dukmasovskoye Rural Settlement of Shovgenovsky District, the Republic of Adygea, Russia. The population was 133 as of 2018. There are three streets.

== Geography ==
Orekhov is located 27 km (17 mi) west of Khakurinokhabl (the district's administrative centre) by road. Mokronazarov is the nearest rural locality.
