= Sadovy, Krasnooktyabrskoye Rural Settlement, Maykopsky District, Republic of Adygea =

Sadovy Садовый Чъыгхат
- Khutor
- Location within Republic of Adygea Location within Russia
- Coordinates: 44°33′N 40°06′E
- Country: Russia
- Region: Adygea
- District: Maykopsky District
- Time zone: UTC+3:00

Sadovy (Russian: Садовый; Adyghe: Чъыгхат) is a rural locality (a khutor) in Krasnooktyabrskoye Rural Settlement of Maykopsky District, Russia. The population was 451 as of 2018. There are 23 streets.

== Geography ==
The khutor is in the valley of the Kurdzhips River, 11 km northwest of Tulsky (the district's administrative centre) by road. Tabachny is the nearest rural locality.
