= Sadovy, Giaginsky District, Republic of Adygea =

Sadovy Садовый Чъыгхат
- Khutor
- Location within Republic of Adygea Location within Russia
- Coordinates: 44°50′N 40°14′E
- Country: Russia
- Region: Adygea
- District: Giaginsky District
- Time zone: UTC+3:00

Sadovy (Russian: Садовый; Adyghe: Чъыгхат) is a rural locality (a khutor) in Ayryumovskoye Rural Settlement of Giaginsky District, Adygea, Russia. The population of this khutor was 202 as of 2018. There are 2 streets.

== Geography ==
Sadovy is located 22 km southeast of Giaginskaya (the district's administrative centre) by road. Krasny Khleborob is the nearest rural locality.
