= Sadovoye, Republic of Adygea =

Sadovoye Садовое Чъыгхат
- Village
- Location within Republic of Adygea Location within Russia
- Coordinates: 45°00′N 39°41′E
- Country: Russia
- Region: Adygea
- District: Krasnogvardeysky District
- Time zone: UTC+3:00

Sadovoye (Russian: Садовое; Adyghe: Чъыгхат) is a rural locality (a selo) and the administrative center of Sadovskoye Rural Settlement of Krasnogvardeysky District, Adygea, Russia. The population was 1422 as of 2018. There are 15 streets.

== Geography ==
Sadovoye is located 20 km southeast of Krasnogvardeyskoye (the district's administrative centre) by road. Bzhedugkhabl is the nearest rural locality.

== Ethnicity ==
The village is inhabited by Russians (49.4%) and Kurds (46.6%) according to the 2010 census.
