= Khachemzy =

Aul in Adygea, Russia

Khachemzy Хачемзий Хьакӏэмзый
- Aul
- Location within Republic of Adygea Location within Russia
- Coordinates: 44°57′N 40°18′E
- Country: Russia
- Region: Adygea
- District: Koshekhablsky District

Population (2018)
  - Total: 672
- Time zone: UTC+3:00

Khachemzy (Russian: Хачемзий; Adyghe: Хьакӏэмзый) is a rural locality (an aul) in Dmitriyevskoye Rural Settlement of Koshekhablsky District, Adygea, Russia. The population was 672 as of 2018. There are 16 streets.

== Geography ==
The aul is located on the left bank of the Fars River, 19 km northwest of Koshekhabl (the district's administrative centre) by road. Otradny is the nearest rural locality.

== Ethnicity ==
The settlement is inhabited by Circassians.
