= Grozny, Pobedenskoye Rural Settlement, Maykopsky District, Republic of Adygea =

Grozny Грозный
- Khutor
- Location within Republic of Adygea Location within Russia
- Coordinates: 44°33′N 40°08′E
- Country: Russia
- Region: Adygea
- District: Maykopsky District
- Time zone: UTC+3:00

Grozny (Russian: Грозный) is a rural locality (a khutor) in Pobedenskoye Rural Settlement of Maykopsky District, Russia. The population was 695 as of 2018. There are 20 streets.
