= Dzherokay =

Dzherokay Джерокай Джыракъый
- Aul
- Location within Republic of Adygea Location within Russia
- Coordinates: 44°59′N 40°18′E
- Country: Russia
- Region: Adygea
- District: Shovgenovsky District
- Time zone: UTC+3:00

Dzherokay (Russian: Джерокай; Adyghe: Джыракъый) is a rural locality (an aul) in Dzherokayskoye Rural Settlement of Shovgenovsky District, the Republic of Adygea, Russia. The population was 1098 as of 2018. There are 16 streets.

== Geography ==
The aul is located on the Fars River, 9 km (5.6 mi) southeast of Khakurinokhabl (the district's administrative centre) by road. Svobodny Trud is the nearest rural locality.

== Ethnicity ==
The aul is inhabited by Circassians.
