= Podgorny (rural locality) =

Podgorny Подгорный Къушъхьэ лъачI
- Settlement
- Location within Republic of Adygea Location within Russia
- Coordinates: 44°41′N 40°05′E
- Country: Russia
- Region: Adygea
- District: Maykop
- Time zone: UTC+3:00

Podgorny (Russian: Подгорный; Adyghe: Къушъхьэ лъачI) is a settlement in urban okrug of Maykop, Russia. The population was 773 as of 2018. There are 9 streets.

== Geography ==
Podgorny is located 12 km north of Maykop (the district's administrative centre) by road. Sovetsky is the nearest rural locality.
