= Khatazhukay =

Khatazhukay Хатажукай Хьатыгъужъыкъуай
- Aul
- Location within Republic of Adygea Location within Russia
- Coordinates: 45°04′N 40°11′E
- Country: Russia
- Region: Adygea
- District: Shovgenovsky District
- Time zone: UTC+3:00

Khatazhukay (Russian: Хатажукай; Adyghe: Хьатыгъужъыкъуай) is a rural locality (an aul) in Khatazhukayskoye Rural Settlement of Shovgenovsky District, the Republic of Adygea, Russia. The population was 907 as of 2018. There are 24 streets.

== Geography ==
Khatazhukay is on the right bank of the Fars River, near the village of Pshicho, 8 km (5.0 mi) north of Khakurinokhabl (the district's administrative centre) by road. Pshicho is the nearest rural locality.

== Ethnicity ==
The aul is inhabited by Circassians.
