= Shovgenovsky District =

Shovgenovsky District Шовгеновский район (Russian)
- District

Other transcription(s)
  - Adyghe: Шэуджэн къедзыгъо
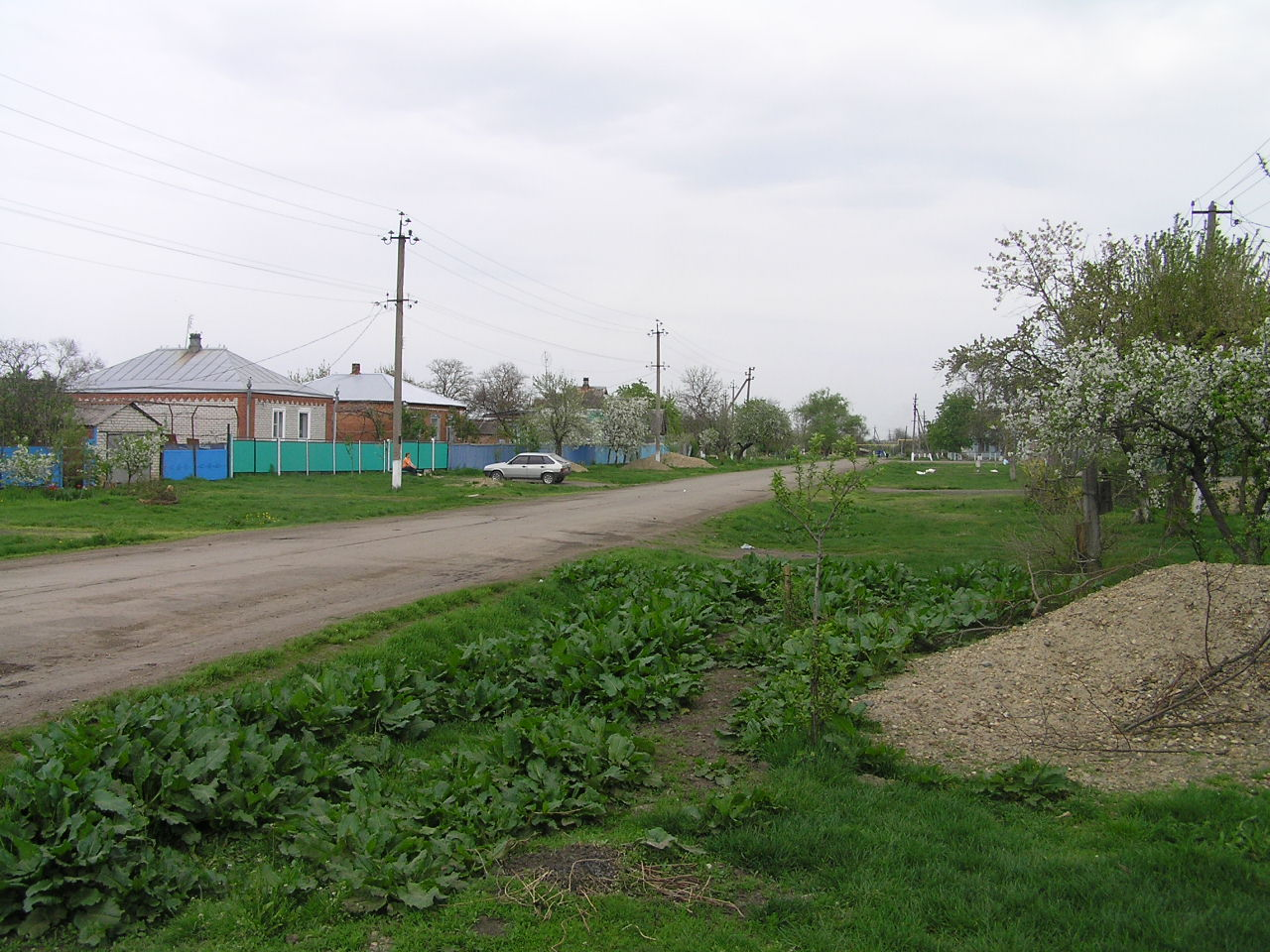
- The village of Chernyshev, Shovgenovsky District

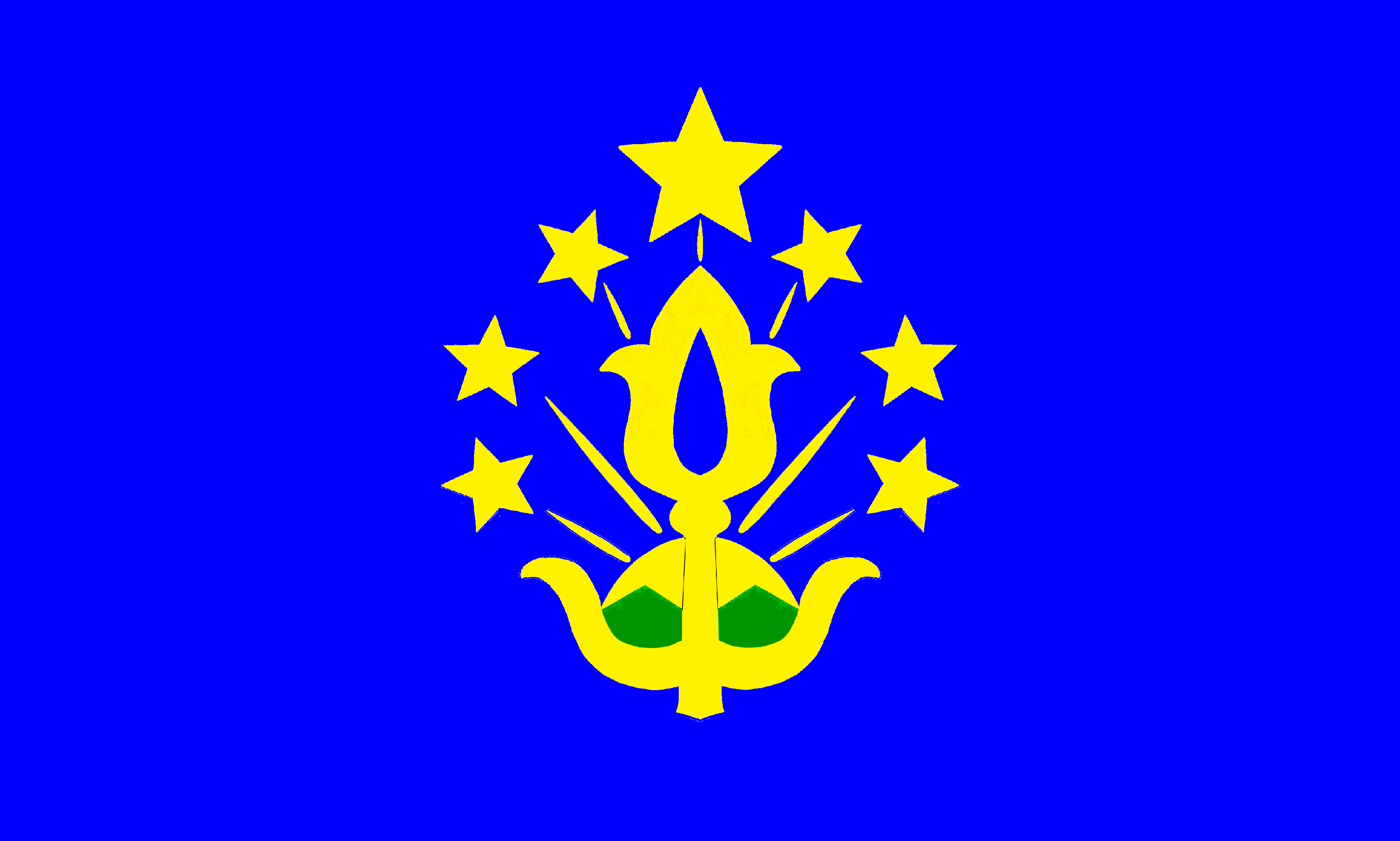
- Flag Coat of arms
- Location of Shovgenovsky District in the Republic of Adygea
- Coordinates: 45°01′N 40°14′E
- Country: Russia
- Federal subject: Republic of Adygea
- Established: January 12, 1965
- Administrative center: Khakurinokhabl

Government
  - Type: Local government
  - Head: Aslan Meretukov

Area
  - Total: 521.43 km^{2} (201.33 sq mi)

Population (2010 Census)
  - Total: 16,997
  - Density: 32.597/km^{2} (84.426/sq mi)
  - Urban: 0%
  - Rural: 100%

Administrative structure
  - Inhabited localities: 31 rural localities

Municipal structure
  - Municipally incorporated as: Shovgenovsky Municipal District
  - Municipal divisions: 0 urban settlements, 6 rural settlements
- Time zone: UTC+3 (MSK)
- OKTMO ID: 79640000
- Website: http://shovgen880.ru

Population of Shovgenovsky District
- 2010 Census: 16,997
- 2002 Census: 16,388
- 1989 Census: 17,867
- 1979 Census: 19,512

Shovgenovsky District (Russian: Шовге́новский райо́н, romanized: Šovgenovskij rajon; Adyghe: Шэуджэн къедзыгъо, romanized: Ṩəwdjən qyedzığo) is an administrative and a municipal district (raion), one of the seven in the Republic of Adygea, Russia. It is located in the central northern portion of the republic and borders with Ust-Labinsky District of Krasnodar Krai in the north, Kurganinsky District of Krasnodar Krai in the north and northeast, Koshekhablsky District in the east and southeast, Giaginsky District in the south, Belorechensky District of Krasnodar Krai in the southwest, and with Krasnogvardeysky District in the west. The area of the district is 521.43 square kilometers (201.33 sq mi). Its administrative center is the rural locality (an aul) of Khakurinokhabl. As of the 2010 Census, the total population of the district was 16,997, with the population of Khakurinokhabl accounting for 23.8% of that number.

== History ==
History of Shovgenovsky District dates back to July 27, 1922, when Adyghe (Cherkess) Autonomous Oblast was established within the Russian SFSR. At that time, the autonomous oblast consisted of three okrugs, one of which, Farssky, covered the territory of modern Shovgenovsky District. On August 5, 1924, Farssky Okrug was renamed Khakurinokhablsky District (Хакуринохабльский район). On December 7, 1956, Khakurinokhablsky District was abolished, and its territory distributed among Koshekhablsky, Giaginsky, and Krasnogvardeysky Districts. On January 12, 1965, however, the district was re-established under the name of Shovgenovsky. During all of the district's history, the aul of Khakurinokhabl served as the district's administrative center.

== Administrative and municipal status ==
Within the framework of administrative divisions, Shovgenovsky District is one of the seven in the Republic of Adygea and has administrative jurisdiction over all of its thirty-one rural localities. As a municipal division, the district is incorporated as Shovgenovsky Municipal District. Its thirty-one rural localities are incorporated into six rural settlements within the municipal district. The aul of Khakurinokhabl serves as the administrative center of both the administrative and municipal district.

=== Municipal composition ===
1. Dukmasovskoye Rural Settlement (Дукмасовское)
  Administrative center: khutor of Dukmasov
  other localities of the rural settlement:
  - khutor of Chikalov
  - khutor of Kasatkin
  - khutor of Mamatsev
  - khutor of Mokronazarov
  - khutor of Orekhov
  - khutor of Pentyukhov
  - khutor of Pikalin
  - khutor of Tikhonov
2. Dzherokayskoye Rural Settlement (Джерокайское)
  Administrative center: aul of Dzherokay
  other localities of the rural settlement:
  - khutor of Semyono-Makarensky
  - khutor of Svobodny Trud
3. Khakurinokhablskoye Rural Settlement (Хакуринохабльское)
  Administrative center: aul of Khakurinokhabl
  other localities of the rural settlement:
  - khutor of Khapachev
  - khutor of Kirov
4. Khatazhukayskoye Rural Settlement (Хатажукайское)
  Administrative center: aul of Pshicho
  other localities of the rural settlement:
  - aul of Kabekhabl
  - aul of Khatazhukay
  - settlement of Leskhozny
  - aul of Pshizov
5. Mamkhegskoye Rural Settlement (Мамхегское)
  Administrative center: aul of Mamkheg
6. Zarevskoye Rural Settlement (Заревское)
  Administrative center: settlement of Zarevo
  other localities of the rural settlement:
  - khutor of Chernyshev
  - khutor of Doroshenko
  - khutor of Kelemetov
  - khutor of Leyboabazov
  - khutor of Mikhaylov
  - khutor of Novorusov
  - settlement of Ulsky
  - khutor of Vesyoly
  - khutor of Zadunayevsky
