= Maykopsky District =

Maykopsky District Майкопский район (Russian)
- District

Other transcription(s)
  - Adyghe: Мыекъуапэ къедзыгъо
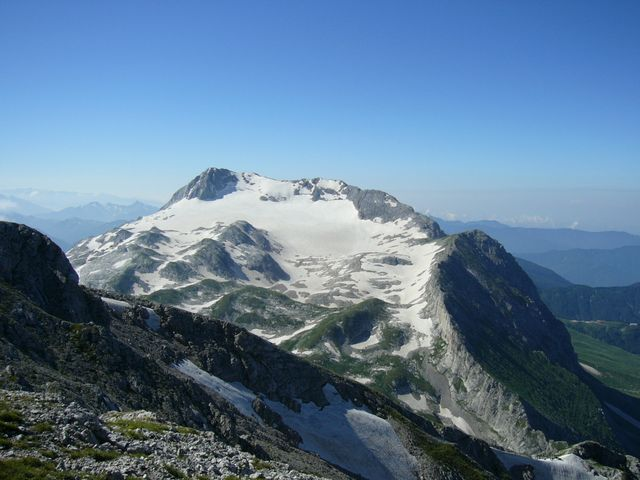
- Mount Fisht in Maykopsky District

- Coat of arms
- Location of Maykopsky District in the Republic of Adygea
- Coordinates: 44°31′N 40°10′E
- Country: Russia
- Federal subject: Republic of Adygea
- Established: February 21, 1940
- Administrative center: Tulsky

Government
  - Type: Local government
  - Head: Alexey Petrusenko

Area
  - Total: 3,667.43 km^{2} (1,416.00 sq mi)

Population (2010 Census)
  - Total: 58,439
  - Density: 15.935/km^{2} (41.270/sq mi)
  - Urban: 30.7%
  - Rural: 69.3%

Administrative structure
  - Inhabited localities: 57 rural localities

Municipal structure
  - Municipally incorporated as: Maykopsky Municipal District
  - Municipal divisions: 0 urban settlements, 10 rural settlements
- Time zone: UTC+3 (MSK)
- OKTMO ID: 79622000
- Holiday: Observed in September
- Website: http://www.mr01.ru

Population of Maykopsky District
- 2010 Census: 58,439
- 2002 Census: 58,485
- 1989 Census: 58,593
- 1979 Census: 70,818

Maykopsky District (Russian: Майко́пский райо́н; Adyghe: Мыекъуапэ къедзыгъо) is an administrative and a municipal district (raion), one of the seven in the Republic of Adygea, Russia. It is located in the south of the republic and borders Giaginsky District in the north, Mostovsky District of Krasnodar Krai in the east, the territory of the City of Sochi in Krasnodar Krai in the south, Apsheronsky District of Krasnodar Krai in the west and southwest, and with Belorechensky District of Krasnodar Krai in the northwest. The area of the district is 3,667.43 square kilometers (1,416.00 sq mi). Its administrative center is the rural locality (a settlement) of Tulsky. As of the 2010 Census, the total population of the district was 58,439, with the population of Tulsky accounting for 18.4% of that number.

== History ==
The predecessor of this district was first established on December 28, 1934 as an administrative division of Azov-Black Sea Krai. It was renamed Tulsky on April 10, 1936. When Azov-Black Sea Krai was divided into Krasnodar Krai and Rostov Oblast in September 1937, Tulsky District remained a part of the former. On February 21, 1940, Maykopsky District was established within Adyghe Autonomous Oblast and on April 28, 1962 Tulsky District of Krasnodar Krai was merged into it.

== Administrative and municipal status ==
Within the framework of administrative divisions, Maykopsky District is one of the seven in the Republic of Adygea and has administrative jurisdiction over all of its fifty-seven rural localities. As a municipal division, the district is incorporated as Maykopsky Municipal District. Its fifty-seven rural localities are incorporated into ten rural settlements within the municipal district. The settlement of Tulsky serves as the administrative center of both the administrative and municipal district.

=== Municipal composition ===
1. Abadzekhskoye Rural Settlement (Абадзехское)
  Administrative center: stanitsa of Abadzekhskaya
  other localities of the rural settlement:
  - stanitsa of Novosvobodnaya
  - settlement of Pervomaysky
  - stanitsa of Sevastopolskaya
  - khutor of Vesyoly
2. Dakhovskoye Rural Settlement (Даховское)
  Administrative center: stanitsa of Dakhovskaya
  other localities of the rural settlement:
  - settlement of Guzeripl
  - selo of Khamyshki
  - settlement of Merkulayevka
  - settlement of Nikel
  - selo of Novoprokhladnoe
  - settlement of Ust-Sakhray
3. Kamennomostskoye Rural Settlement (Каменномостское)
  Administrative center: settlement of Kamennomostsky
  other localities of the rural settlement:
  - settlement of Pobeda
  - khutor of Vesyoly
4. Kirovskoye Rural Settlement (Кировское)
  Administrative center: khutor of Severo-Vostochnyye Sady
  other localities of the rural settlement:
  - khutor of 17 let Oktyabrya
  - khutor of Dyakov
  - khutor of Grozny
  - aul of Mafekhabl
  - khutor of Oktyabrsky
  - khutor of Proletarsky
  - khutor of Sovetsky
5. Krasnooktyabrskoye Rural Settlement (Краснооктябрьское)
  Administrative center: settlement of Krasnooktyabrsky
  other localities of the rural settlement:
  - stanitsa of Bezvodnaya
  - stanitsa of Dagestanskaya
  - settlement of Khakodz
  - khutor of Krasny Most
  - stanitsa of Kurdzhipskaya
  - settlement of Mirny
  - settlement of Prirechny
  - khutor of Sadovy
  - settlement of Spokoyny
  - settlement of Tabachny
6. Krasnoulskoye Rural Settlement (Красноульское)
  Administrative center: khutor of Krasnaya Ulka
  other localities of the rural settlement:
  - khutor of Grazhdansky
  - khutor of Kalinin
  - khutor of Komintern
  - khutor of Tkachyov
  - khutor of Volny
7. Kuzhorskoye Rural Settlement (Кужорское)
  Administrative center: stanitsa of Kuzhorskaya
  other localities of the rural settlement:
  - khutor of Karmir-Astkh
  - settlement of Tryokhrechny
8. Pobedenskoye Rural Settlement (Победенское)
  Administrative center: settlement of Sovkhozny
  other localities of the rural settlement:
  - khutor of Grozny
  - settlement of Pobeda
  - khutor of Prichtovsky
  - khutor of Shaumyan
  - settlement of Udobny
9. Timiryazevskoye Rural Settlement (Тимирязевское)
  Administrative center: settlement of Timiryazeva
  other localities of the rural settlement:
  - settlement of Michurina
  - settlement of Podgorny
  - settlement of Sadovy
  - khutor of Shuntuk
  - settlement of Tsvetochny
10. Tulskoye Rural Settlement (Тульское)
  - Administrative center: settlement of Tulsky
  other localities of the rural settlement:
  - selo of Makhoshepolyana
