= Khakurinokhabl =

Human settlement in Shovgenovsky, Adygea, Russia

Coordinates: 45°01′12″N 40°13′48″E

Khakurinokhabl (Russian: Хакуриноха́бль; Adyghe: Хьэкурынэхьабл, Hekurynehabl) is a rural locality (an aul) and the administrative center of Shovgenovsky District of the Republic of Adygea, Russia, located on the Fars River, 60 kilometers (37 mi) north of Maykop. Population: 4,038 (2010 census); 3,828 (2002 census); 4,101 (1989 Soviet census).

== History ==
Until March 27, 1996, the aul was called Shovgenovsky (Шовгеновский).

== Culture and education ==
There is a museum of Khusen Andrukhayev, a Hero of Soviet Union, founded in 1973 in the aul. As of 2003, there are no educational facilities above the level of secondary school.

== Ecology ==
The landfill of Khakurinokhabl is located dangerously close (2 km or 1.2 mi) to the Fars River and to the agricultural lands, posing high ecological risk since the time of its opening in 2000.
