= Tulsky, Republic of Adygea =

Place in Adygea, Russia

Coordinates: 44°31′30″N 40°10′30″E

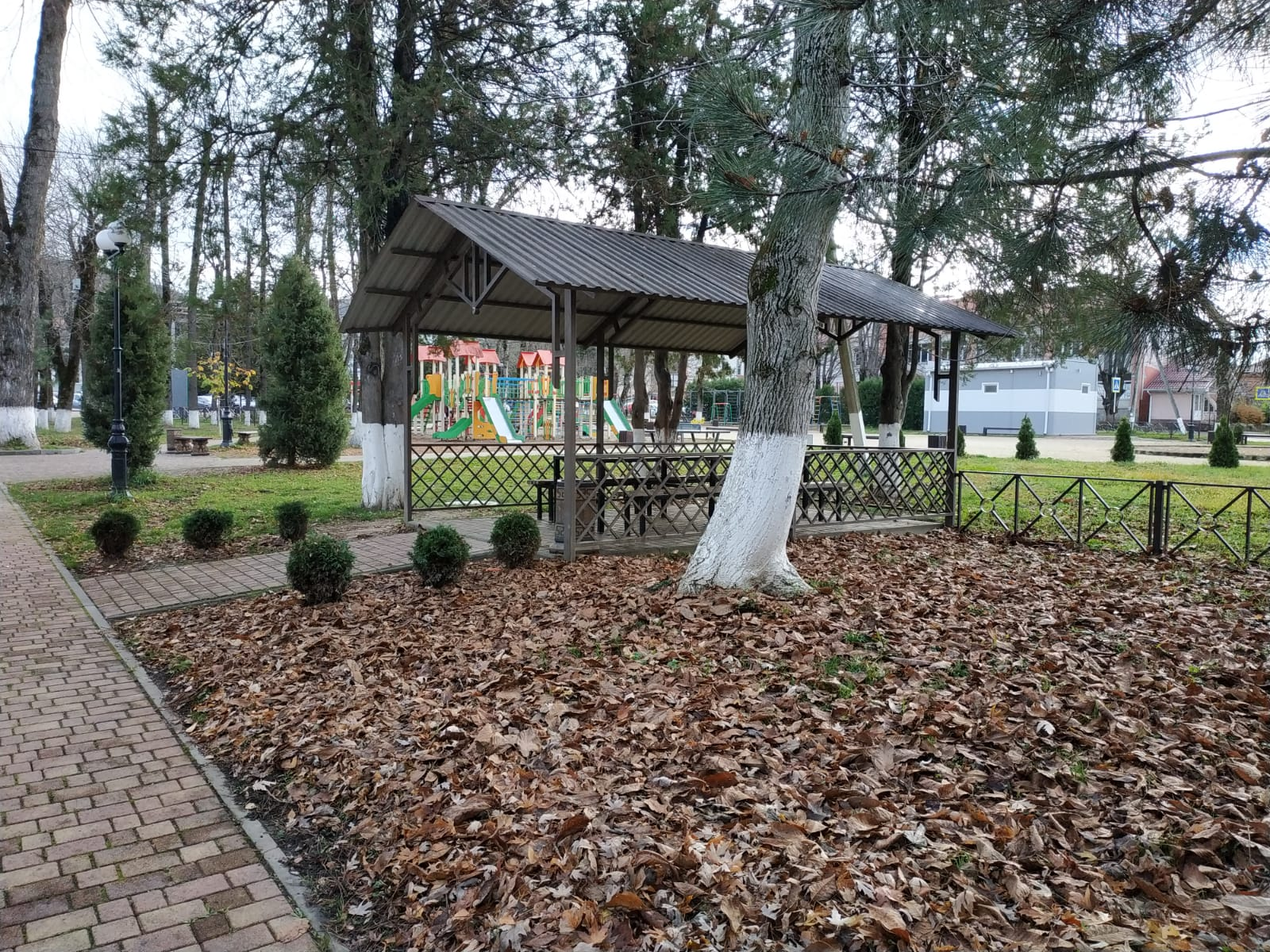
Bower in the park. Tulsky, Republic of Adygea, Russia

Tulsky (Russian: Ту́льский; Adyghe: Еджэркъоежъ, Edžərqoeẑ) is a rural locality (a settlement) and the administrative center of Maykopsky District in the Republic of Adygea, Russia, located on the right bank of the Belaya River (Kuban's tributary) 12 kilometers (7.5 mi) south of Maykop. Population: 10,732 (2010 census); 10,502 (2002 Census); 9,538 (1989 Soviet census).

== History ==
Urban-type settlement status was granted to then-stanitsa of Tulskaya (Ту́льская) in 1963 in anticipation of the settlement's industrial growth. In April 2011, a referendum was planned to decide whether Tulsky should be demoted to a rural locality—a move that would allow the population to receive some benefits from the social programs specific to rural areas, as well as to lower the utility costs. The results were in favor, and by the Law of November 2, 2011 Tulsky was formally demoted to rural status.

== Culture ==
There is a museum of local history in the settlement.

Tulsky hosted the 15th Regional Festival of Cossack culture in 2006.
