= Mass media in Abkhazia =

Mass media in Abkhazia consists of several TV channels, newspapers, magazines and radio stations. Some of them are government-owned, others are private. Apsnypress is the government information agency. Russian media are generally also available and popular.

== History ==
The first newspaper appeared in Abkhazia in 1917, Dmitry Gulia was its editor. It was succeeded by Apsny Kapsh (Red Abkhazia) in Soviet times. Alongside it there were numerous other publications in Abkhaz, Russian, Georgian, Armenian, Greek and Laz languages. The 1992–1993 Georgian-Abkhaz war which was followed by the exodus of a large share of the republic's population and a blockade had a profound effect on all the media, with only a few surviving it.

== Media outlets ==
=== Print media ===
There are two government and several private newspapers, published in Russian (predominantly) and Abkhaz. The circulation ranges from 1,000 to 5,000, most of the newspapers are weeklies. There is a degree a diversity, opposition media criticise the government over the wide range of issues such as Abkhazian-Russian relations and internal politics. Novy Den and Chegemskaya Pravda newspapers had a pro-opposition tone during the 2009 presidential elections. There have been several claims of harassment of journalists by the authorities. In September 2009, a court in Sukhumi gave journalist Anton Krivenyuk a three-year suspended sentence for allegedly libelling Bagapsh. Some Abkhazian journalists viewed this as an intimidation of opposition in the run-up to the elections.

There is a trilingual semimonthly newspaper, Gal, published in Gali District.

=== Radio broadcasting ===
Radio Soma is the only private radio station is very popular, broadcasting 24 hours a day, primarily music, but also carrying some news and, at times, live talk shows with invited guests. The state radio, like state TV, broadcasts for 3–4 hours a day. In December 2014, Sputnik (news agency) inaugurated its website and radio broadcasting in Abkhazia.

=== Television broadcasting ===
The most important channel is a state-run one (Apsua TV), which is broadcast up to 6 hours a day, with 15-minute news in Abkhaz and Russian. It is the only local channel available all over the country. Abaza TV, the only private station, reaches only Sukhumi and its environs. It is owned by Beslan Butba and supported him during the 2009 presidential elections. Another private channel, Sukhum-TV existed in the capital in 2006, there are local TV stations in Gagra and Tkvarcheli.

Russian channels, such as Channel One, Russia 1, NTV and Kultura, are available throughout Abkhazia. There is an access to Georgian TV in some parts of Abkhazia as well.

On 25 January 2016, Prime Minister Artur Mikvabia released, upon her request, Emma Khojava from the post of General Director of the Abkhazian State TV and Radio, and appointed Roland Bganba as her temporary replacement. On 29 January, former Culture Minister Leonid Enik was appointed as the new General Director.

== Media freedom in Abkhazia ==
Abkhazia is not part of international treaties such as the ICCPR and the ECHR, which for most countries in the world constitute legal obligations for the state-party to respect human rights, including freedom of expression and press freedom. However, Abkhazian authorities have made a commitment to respect international standards of democratic governance and human rights. The ‘Constitution of Abkhazia’ recognises and guarantees, in Chapter 2, Article 11, “the human rights and freedoms fixed in the Universal Declaration of Human Rights, the International covenants of economic, social, cultural, civil and political rights, or in other universally recognized international legal acts.

Media freedom and pluralism in Abkhazia is affected by government influence as well as by the penetration of Russian media in the Abkhazian media landscape. According to Freedom House 2016 report, the government, which operates the Abkhaz State Television and Radio Company (AGTRK) largely controls also local broadcast media.

The IREX Media Sustainability report for the year 2016 notes the view of a group of Georgian panelists who agreed that Russia’s influence in the region is growing, and its impact on Abkhazia's media landscape is evidenced by the fact that “because of Russia’s huge influence and interference no media representatives broadcast anything in Abkhazian language.”

=== Attacks and threats against journalists ===
Attacks and killings of journalists in Abkhazia have been registered during the War in Abkhazia (1992–1993).

According to the registry of journalists killed, which is maintained by the US-based, independent organization Committee to Protect Journalists (CPJ), two foreign journalists lost their life in 1993 while covering the conflict: the Wall Street Journal correspondent Alexandra Tuttle was killed on September 22, 1993, while being on a military aircraft hit by an Abkhazian ground-to-air missile. while Russian war photographer Andrey Soloviev was killed in Shukumi by a sniper fire on September 27, 1993.

A third journalist, Georgian reporter Georgy Chanya, was killed on 27 May 1998 while being engaged in the coverage of a new outburst of fighting near Gali.

== See also ==
- Abkhazian Network News Agency
- Apsnypress

== Sources ==
- A Survey of Access to Information in Abkhazia and its Impact on People’s Lives, Article 19, June 2007
- Abkhazia Today, International Crisis Group, 15.09.2006
- Abkhazia: Deepening Dependence, International Crisis Group, 26.02.2010
