= Adygea constituency =

Constituency of the State Duma of the Russian Federation

Adygea single-member constituency
- Constituency of the Russian State Duma

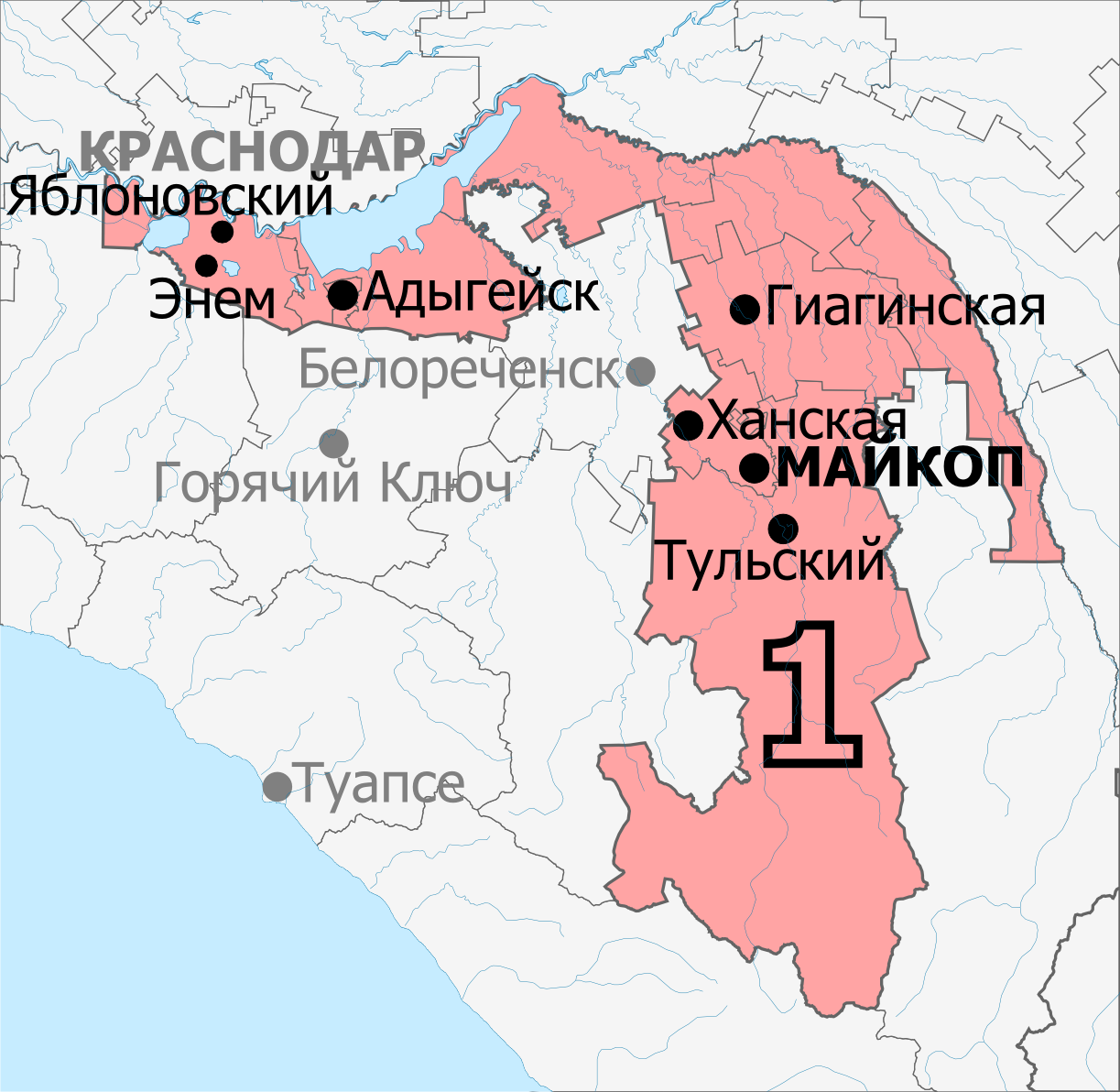
- Deputy: Vladislav Reznik; United Russia
- Federal subject: Adygea
- Districts: Giaginsky, Koshekhablsky, Krasnogvardeysky, Maykopsky, Shovgenovsky, Takhtamukaysky, Teuchezhsky, Maykop, Adygeysk
- Voters: 338,585 (2026)

The Adygea constituency (No.1) is a Russian legislative constituency in the Republic of Adygea. The constituency encompasses the entire territory of Adygea.

The constituency has been represented since 2016 by United Russia deputy Vladislav Reznik, a six-term State Duma member and insurance executive, who was elected as an independent in 2016 and 2021.

== Boundaries ==
1993–2007, 2016–present: Adygeysk, Giaginsky District, Koshekhablsky District, Krasnogvardeysky District, Maykop, Maykopsky District, Shovgenovsky District, Takhtamukaysky District, Teuchezhsky District
The constituency has been covering the entirety of the Republic of Adygea since its initial creation in 1993.

== Members elected ==
Election	Member	Party
1993	Valentin Lednev	Independent
1995	Grigory Senin	Communist Party
1999	Grigory Senin	Communist Party
2003	Nikolay Demchuk	United Russia
2007	Proportional representation - no election by constituency	
2011	Proportional representation - no election by constituency	
2016	Vladislav Reznik	Independent
2021	Vladislav Reznik	Independent
2026	Vladislav Reznik	United Russia

== Election results ==
=== 1993 ===
==== Declared candidates ====
- Eduard Akhmetov (BR–NI), Ministry of Justice of Adygea official
- Arambiy Blyagoz (YaBL), businessman
- Pshimaf Khakuz (Independent), Krasnodar Polytechnic Institute department of philosophy head, 1991–1992 presidential candidate (previously ran as YaBL candidate)
- Georgy Kozmenko (Independent), Member of Legislative Assembly – Parliament of the Republic of Adygea (1993–present)
- Valentin Lednev (Independent), Deputy Premier of Adygea – Minister of Social Protection (1993–present) (previously ran as BR–NI and Civic Union candidate)
- Grigory Senin (Independent), furniture factory foreman

==== Results ====
Summary of the 12 December 1993 Russian legislative election in the Adygea constituency
Candidate	Party	Votes	%
Valentin Lednev	Independent	46,755	23.90%
Grigory Senin	Independent	34,949	17.87%
Eduard Akhmetov	Future of Russia–New Names	29,051	14.85%
Georgy Kozmenko	Independent	28,581	14.61%
Pshimaf Khakuz	Independent	16,526	8.45%
Arambiy Blyagoz	Yavlinsky–Boldyrev–Lukin	7,606	3.89%
against all		14,022	7.17%
Total		195,625	100%

=== 1995 ===
==== Declared candidates ====
- Viktor Aleynikov (LDPR)
- Zhanpago Apazhikhova (Independent), Ministry of Labor and Social Protection of Adygea secretary
- Anatoly Berezovoy (Independent), retired cosmonaut, Hero of the Soviet Union (1982)
- Arambiy Blyagoz (PGL), businessman, 1993 YaBL candidate for this seat
- Vitaly Kalashaov (Independent), construction businessman
- Aslan Khagurov (K–TR–zSS), surgeon
- Valentin Lednev (Independent), incumbent Member of State Duma (1994–present)
- Anatoly Osokin (Independent), Member of Legislative Assembly – Parliament of the Republic of Adygea (1993–present)
- Grigory Senin (CPRF), furniture factory foreman, 1993 candidate for this seat
- Valery Tretyakov (APR)
- Lyubov Usacheva (NDR), union leader
- Yury Yakhutl (Independent)
- Aydamir Yeshev (Yabloko), chairman of the party regional office

==== Results ====
Summary of the 17 December 1995 Russian legislative election in the Adygea constituency
Candidate	Party	Votes	%
Grigory Senin	Communist Party	56,353	26.16%
Anatoly Osokin	Independent	21,472	9.97%
Valentin Lednev (incumbent)	Independent	21,252	9.87%
Lybov Usacheva	Our Home – Russia	17,150	7.96%
Aslan Khagurov	Communists and Working Russia - for the Soviet Union	17,041	7.91%
Anatoly Berezovoy	Independent	14,505	6.73%
Aleksey Aleynikov	Liberal Democratic Party	12,403	5.76%
Zhanpago Apazhikhova	Independent	9,001	4.18%
Aydamir Yeshev	Yabloko	6,837	3.17%
Arambiy Blyagoz	Pamfilova–Gurov–Lysenko	4,788	2.22%
Yury Yakhutl	Independent	4,618	2.14%
Valery Tretyakov	Agrarian Party of Russia	4,588	2.13%
Vitaly Kalashaov	Independent	4,349	2.02%
against all		14,159	6.57%
Total		215,393	100%

=== 1999 ===
==== Declared candidates ====
- Adam Bogus (Yabloko), Member of State Council of the Republic of Adygea (1996–present), businessman
- Aleksandr Dorofeyev (Independent), Member of State Council of the Republic of Adygea (1992–present), Deputy Commander of the North Caucasus Military District (1991–present), Russian Army major general
- Vladimir Gavrilenko (Independent), Rosaviatsiya staffer
- Nina Konovalova (KRO-Boldyrev), Member of State Council of the Republic of Adygea (1992–1993, 1996–present)
- Valentin Lednev (LDPR), former Member of State Duma (1994–1995)
- Gennady Markov (NDR), engineer
- Yevgeny Salov (Independent), Chairman of the State Council of the Republic of Adygea (1996–present), Member of the State Council (1991–present)
- Grigory Senin (CPRF), incumbent Member of State Duma (1996–present)
- Aslanbiy Sovmiz (Independent), oil businessman, 1997 presidential candidate

==== Failed to qualify ====
- Askarbiy Adzhigiriyev (Nikolayev–Fyodorov Bloc), Maykop State Technological University associate professor
- Aslan Bezrukov (Independent), former Member of Legislative Assembly – Parliament of the Republic of Adygea (1991–1996)
- Sergey Kupin (Independent), businessman
- Viktor Kupin (Independent), Judge of the Constitutional Court of Adygea

==== Did not file ====
- Oleg Khuazhev (Independent), economist
- Vladimir Logachev (Independent)

==== Results ====
Summary of the 19 December 1999 Russian legislative election in the Adygea constituency
Candidate	Party	Votes	%
Grigory Senin (incumbent)	Communist Party	46,516	22.32%
Nina Konovalova	Congress of Russian Communities-Yuri Boldyrev Movement	44,244	21.23%
Aleksandr Dorofeyev	Independent	37,926	18.19%
Adam Bogus	Yabloko	33,735	16.18%
Yevgeny Salov	Independent	11,319	5.43%
Valentin Lednev	Liberal Democratic Party	7,285	3.49%
Aslanbiy Sovmiz	Independent	4,805	2.31%
Gennady Markov	Our Home – Russia	4,347	2.09%
Vladimir Gavrilenko	Independent	3,162	1.52%
against all		9,548	4.58%
Total		208,443	100%

=== 2003 ===
==== Declared candidates ====
- Igor Andreyev (LDPR), market worker
- Nikolay Demchuk (United Russia), Vice President of Adygea (2003–present)
- Azmet Dzharimok (VR–ES), accountant
- Nina Filipyeva (SPS), auditor
- Sergey Grozov (Independent), businessman
- Anatoly Ivanov (PVR-RPZh), Member of State Council of the Republic of Adygea (1991–present)
- Timur Kalakutok (Independent), Member of State Council of the Republic of Adygea (2002–present)
- Aliy Khachak (KPE), artistic ensemble director
- Nina Konovalova (Independent), Member of State Council of the Republic of Adygea (1992–1993, 1996–present), 1999 candidate for this seat, 2002 presidential candidate
- Sergey Kupin (Independent), businessman, 1999 candidate for this seat
- Grigory Senin (CPRF), incumbent Member of State Duma (1996–present)
- Aleksandr Sirchenko (Independent), Ministry of Economic Development and Trade of Russia official
- Pavel Vasiliadi (SDPR), Deputy Chairman of the Maykop City Council of People's Deputies (2002–present)

==== Withdrawn candidates ====
- Eduard Kuyek (APR), agriculture businessman
- Aleksandr Naumov (ORP Rus'), former Deputy Commander of the North Caucasus Military District (1996–1998), retired Russian Army lieutenant general

==== Failed to qualify ====
- Anna Guz (ZRS), regional station of plant protection director
- Mukharby Kirzhinov (Independent), 1972 Olympic Champion weightlifter
- Nikolay Konkov (Independent), former Minister of Interethnic Relations and Socio-Political Forecasting of Adygea

==== Did not file ====
- Oleg Krutov (Independent), corporate executive

==== Results ====
Summary of the 7 December 2003 Russian legislative election in the Adygea constituency
Candidate	Party	Votes	%
Nikolay Demchuk	United Russia	87,050	47.43%
Nina Konovalova	Independent	26,195	14.27%
Grigory Senin (incumbent)	Communist Party	20,444	11.14%
Timur Kalakutok	Independent	6,125	3.34%
Sergey Grozov	Independent	5,907	3.21%
Igor Andreyev	Liberal Democratic Party	4,027	2.19%
Azmet Dzharimok	Great Russia–Eurasian Union	3,864	2.11%
Anatoly Ivanov	Party of Russia's Rebirth-Russian Party of Life	3,166	1.72%
Aleksandr Sirchenko	Independent	2,990	1.63%
Aliy Khachak	Conceptual Party "Unity"	2,371	1.29%
Nina Filipyeva	Union of Right Forces	2,156	1.17%
Sergey Kupin	Independent	1,540	0.84%
Pavel Vasiliadi	Social Democratic Party	1,371	0.75%
against all		13,270	7.23%
Total		183,549	100%

=== 2016 ===
==== Declared candidates ====
- Valery Brinikh (The Greens), ecologist
- Sergey Gukasyan (CPCR), perennial candidate
- Nina Konovalova (Rodina), Member of Maykop City Council of People's Deputies (2013–present), former Member of State Council of the Republic of Adygea (1992–1993, 1996–2011), 1999 and 2003 candidate for this seat, 2002 presidential candidate
- Aleksandr Loboda (A Just Russia), Member of State Council of the Republic of Adygea (2011–present)
- Denis Ogiyenko (LDPR), aide to State Duma member Yury Napso
- Vladislav Reznik (Independent), Member of State Duma (2000–present), United Russia primary candidate
- Yevgeny Salov (CPRF), Member of State Council of the Republic of Adygea (1991–present), former Chairman of the State Council (1996–2001), 1999 candidate for this seat

==== Withdrawn candidates ====
- Vladislav Zafesov (Party of Growth), Commissioner for Entrepreneurs' Rights in Adygea (2013–present)

==== Failed to qualify ====
- Mukharbiy Tkharkakhov (Independent), Member of State Council of the Republic of Adygea (1993–1996, 2001–2006, 2011–present), former Chairman of the State Council (2001–2006)

==== Did not file ====
- Eduard Tkhakushinov (Independent), Member of State Council of the Republic of Adygea (2007–present), brother of Head of Adygea Aslan Tkhakushinov

==== Declined ====
- Murat Khasanov (United Russia), Chairman of the Adygea Committee on Physical Culture and Sport (2007–present), World Champion sambist (won the primary, ran on the party list)
- Rustem Meretukov (United Russia), Minister of Health of Adygea (2012–present) (lost the primary, ran on the party list)
- Raziyot Natkho (United Russia), Member of State Duma (2011–present) (lost the primary, ran on the party list)
- Anatoly Osokin (United Russia), Commissioner for Human Rights in Adygea (2009–present), 1995 candidate for this seat (lost the primary)

==== Results ====
Summary of the 18 September 2016 Russian legislative election in the Adygea constituency
Candidate	Party	Votes	%
Vladislav Reznik	Independent	100,651	55.22%
Yevgeny Salov	Communist Party	26,603	14.59%
Nina Konovalova	Rodina	12,956	7.11%
Denis Ogiyenko	Liberal Democratic Party	11,655	6.39%
Aleksandr Loboda	A Just Russia	10,612	5.82%
Sergey Gukasyan	Communists of Russia	7,016	3.85%
Valery Brunikh	Greens	5,817	3.19%
Total		175,310	100%

=== 2021 ===
==== Declared candidates ====
- Yevgeny Grunin (LDPR), Member of Maykop City Council of People's Deputies (2018–present), legal counsel
- Sergey Gukasyan (CPCR), perennial candidate, 2016 candidate for this seat
- Andrey Mikhaylov (SR–ZP), attorney, law firm partner
- Vladislav Reznik (Independent), incumbent Member of State Duma (2000–present)
- Yevgeny Salov (CPRF), Member of State Council of the Republic of Adygea (1991–present), former Chairman of the State Council (1996–2001), 1999 and 2016 candidate for this seat
- Ruslanbek Tsikunib (New People), businessman

==== Failed to qualify ====
- Adam Beshkok (RPPSS), homemaker
- Vladislav Gamanovich (Rodina), Member of Enem City Council of People's Deputies (2017–present), printing house manager
- Pyotr Kuplinov (ROS), unemployed

==== Results ====
Summary of the 17-19 September 2021 Russian legislative election in the Adygea constituency
Candidate	Party	Votes	%
Vladislav Reznik (incumbent)	Independent	150,217	64.81%
Yevgeny Salov	Communist Party	29,366	12.67%
Andrey Mikhaylov	A Just Russia — For Truth	14,349	6.19%
Yevgeny Grunin	Liberal Democratic Party	12,356	5.33%
Sergey Gukasyan	Communists of Russia	10,468	4.52%
Ruslanbek Tsikunib	New People	10,109	4.36%
Total		212,733	100%

=== 2026 ===
==== Declared candidates ====
- Sergey Gukasyan (CPCR), perennial candidate, 2016 and 2021 candidate for this seat
- Timur Nepso (Rodina), security executive
- Albert Osmanov (A Just Russia), former Head of Krasnogvardeysky District (2017–2020), former Minister of Labor and Social Development of Adygea (2013–2017)
- Vladislav Reznik (United Russia), incumbent Member of State Duma (2000–present)
- Tembot Shovgenov (LDPR), Member of State Council of the Republic of Adygea (2016–present)
- Marina Sitnikova (CPRF), Member of Maykop City Council of People's Deputies (2018–present), party lawyer
- Rashid Tsakhayev (New People), infectious disease physician

==== Results ====
Summary of the 18-20 September 2026 Russian legislative election in the Adygea constituency
Candidate	Party	Votes	%
Vladislav Reznik (incumbent)	United Russia	179,768	67.09%
Marina Sitnikova	Communist Party	22,350	8.34%
Tembot Shovgenov	Liberal Democratic Party	19,370	7.23%
Albert Osmanov	A Just Russia	16,147	6.03%
Rashid Tsakhayev	New People	13,345	4.98%
Sergey Gukasyan	Communists of Russia	6,937	2.59%
Timur Nepso	Rodina	5,627	2.10%
Total		267,938	100%
