= Vyacheslav Shverikas =

Russian politician (1961–2021)

- Вячеслав Шверикас
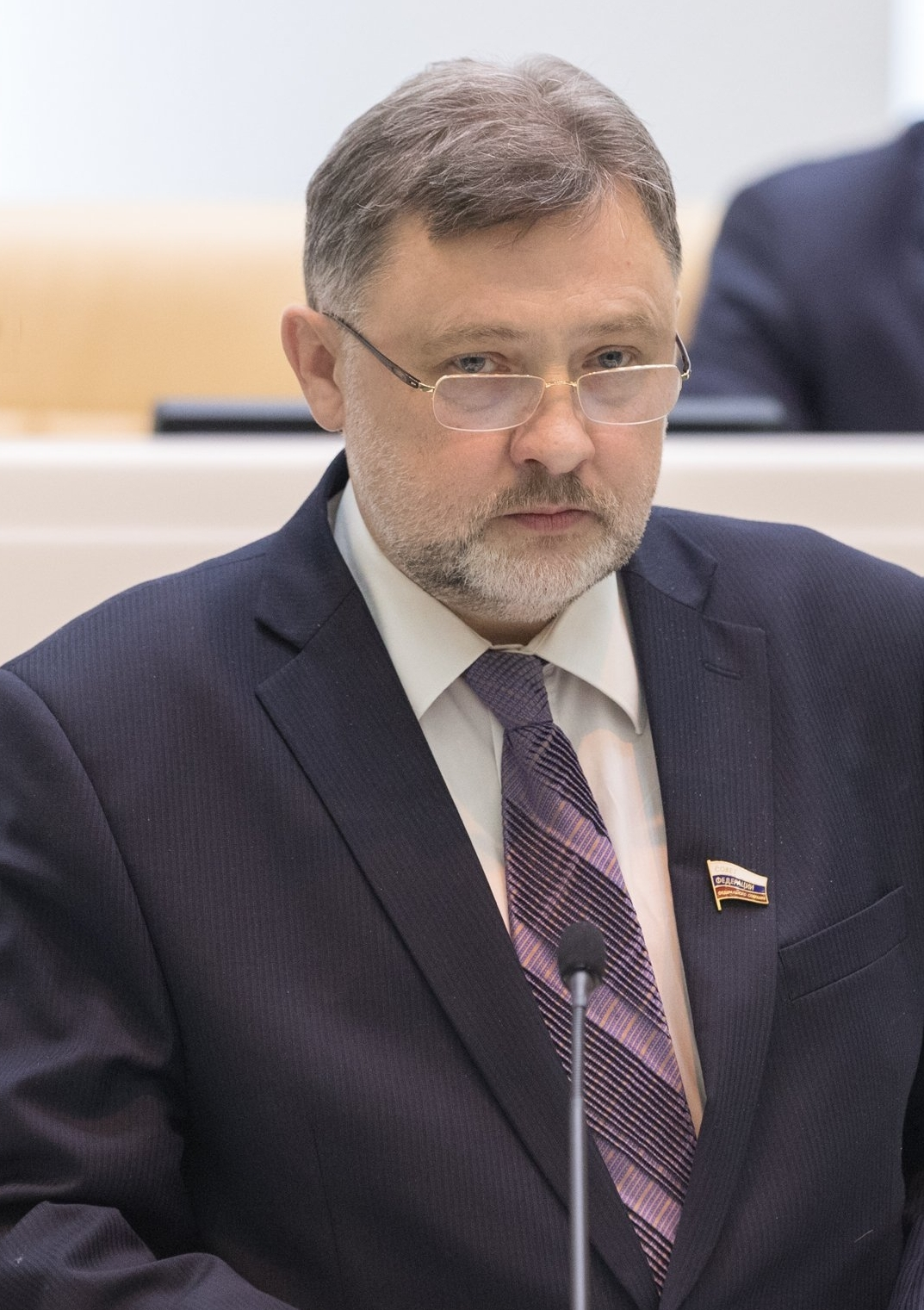
- Shverikas in 2016

Russian Federation Senator from the Republic of Adygea
- In office 28 January 2004 – 10 September 2017
- Preceded by: Andrey Vorobyov
- Succeeded by: Oleg Seleznyov

Personal details
- Born: 3 February 1961 Russian SFSR, Soviet Union
- Died: 23 June 2021 (aged 60)
- Party: United Russia
- Education: Leningrad State University (1984)

Vyacheslav Nikolayevich Shverikas (Russian: Вячеслав Николаевич Шверикас, 3 February 1961 – 23 June 2021) was a Russian politician. He served as member of the Federation Council of the Federal Assembly as the representative of Adygea.

Shverikas graduated from Leningrad State University with a speciality in economics, and went on to work with the Saint Petersburg City Administration, before moving to the central governmental organs, holding positions in the Presidential Administration of Russia, and the Ministry of Finance. In 2004 he was appointed the representative of the Republic of Adygea's executive body to the Federation Council. He held the post through two convocations of the council, between 2004 and 2017. He sat on several of the council's committees during his tenure, including those on financial markets and currency circulation, on information policy, and on economic policy. He stepped down in 2017, and died in 2021.

== Career ==
=== Early politics ===
Shverikas was born on 3 February 1961. He graduated from the Faculty of Economics of Leningrad State University in 1984 as an economist, and teacher of political economy. After graduating, he worked in production, and then with the Saint Petersburg City Administration.

Shverikas then became head of the general department of the Main Control Directorate of the Presidential Administration of Russia, working in the central government apparatus, as well as in the Ministry of Finance. At the time of his election as a senator he was the head of the Department of Management of Affairs and Personnel of the Ministry of Finance. Prior to his appointment to the Federation Council, he was a deputy of the third convocation of Council of People's Deputies of Adygea for Maykopsky District. In 2003 he was awarded the Medal "In Commemoration of the 300th Anniversary of Saint Petersburg".

=== Member of the Federation Council ===
In January 2004 Shverikas was appointed the representative from the Republic of Adygea's executive body to the Federation Council. His term lasted until March 2012. He became member of the council's committees on Financial Markets and Currency Circulation from March 2004 to October 2009, on Information Policy from March 2004 to November 2011, on control over the provision of activities of the Federation Council from April 2004 to April 2008, on International Affairs from November 2011 to March 2012, and on the Commonwealth of Independent States from October 2009 to November 2011. He was confirmed for the second time on 6 April 2012, with his term due to expire in September 2017.

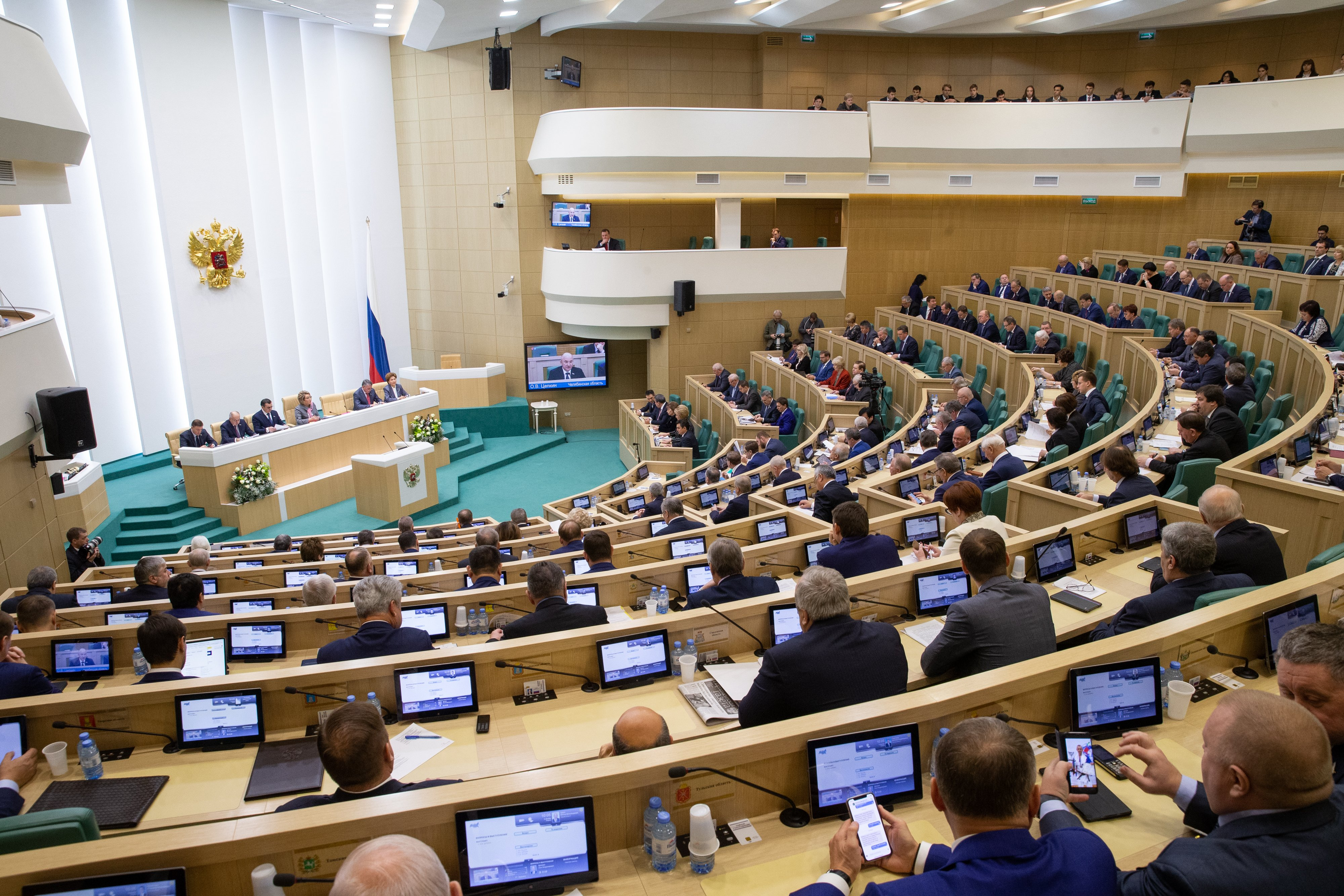
A session of the Federation Council. Shverikas was a member for two terms between 2004 and 2017.

As a member of the Federation Council's Committee on Economic Policy he helped to draft laws to improve the bankruptcy procedure for insurance organizations. He was also chairman of the committee's Expert Council on the Development of the Precious Metals and Precious Stones Industry, holding a round table in April 2016 on the topic of "Improving the procedures for the import and export of precious metals and goods". He also hosted presentations to the committee from Adygean producers in the context of entering international markets. He was also a member of the board of trustees of the patriarchal compound of the Znamenskaya Church in Dubrovitsy. On the expiration of his second term on 10 September 2017, his successor Oleg Seleznyov, was appointed by Murat Kumpilov, Head of the Republic of Adygea.

Over his political career Shverikas received a certificate of honour of the Federation Council, and the honorary badge of the Federation Council "For merits in the development of parliamentarism." He died on 23 June 2021, at the age of 60. His death was announced by Murat Kumpilov, Head of the Republic of Adygea.
