= Alexander Narolin =

Russian politician

- Александр Наролин
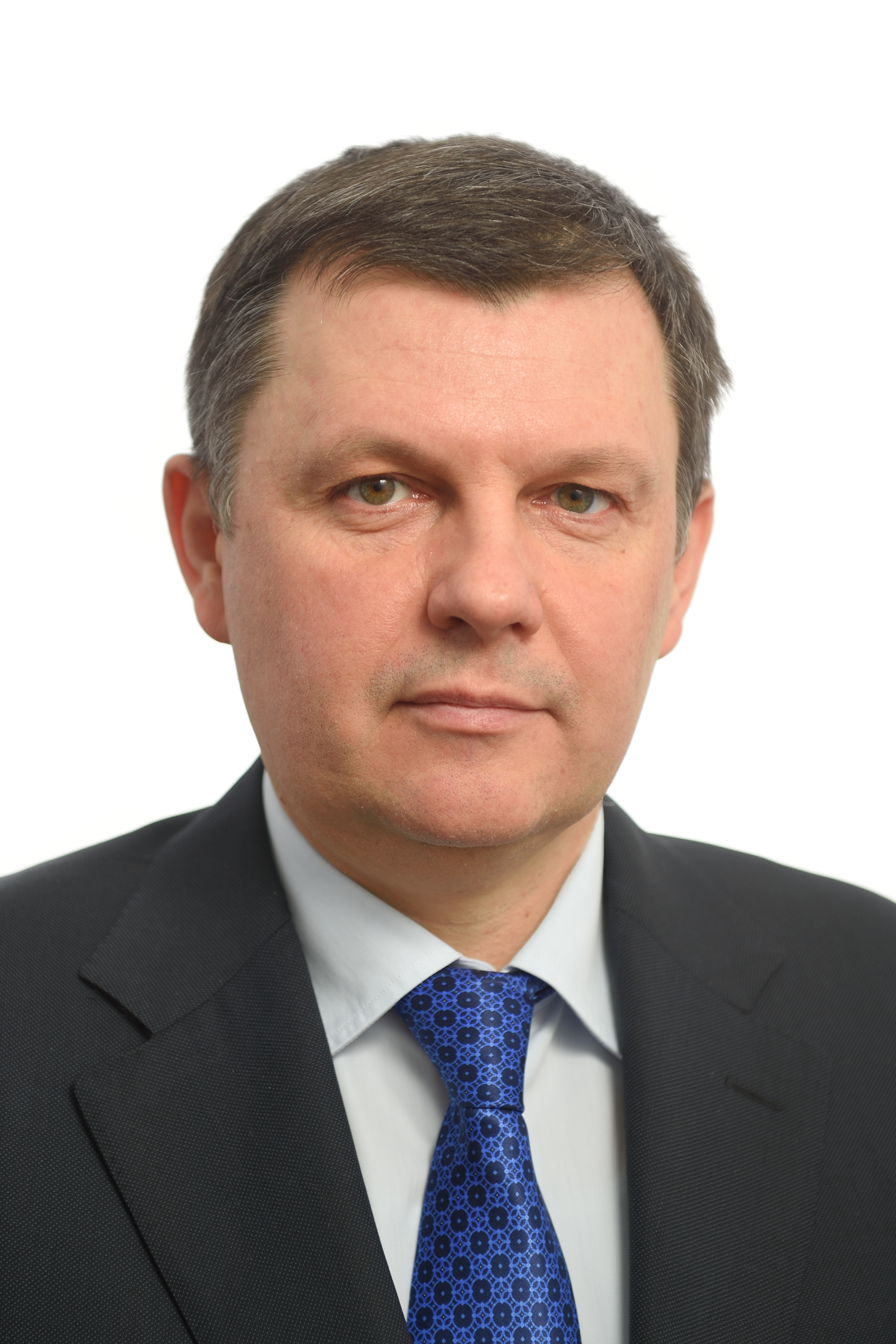
- Narolin in 2018

Russian Federation Senator from Adygea
- Incumbent
- Assumed office 14 December 2021 Serving with Murat Khapsirokov
- Preceded by: Oleg Seleznyov

Prime Minister of Adygea
- In office 2017–2021

Mayor of Maykop
- In office 2013–2017

Personal details
- Born: Alexander Narolin; 27 June 1972 (age 54) Krasnogvardeyskoye, Adyghe AO, Russian SFSR, Soviet Union (now Adygea, Russia)
- Party: United Russia
- Education: Kuban State Agrarian University

Alexander Vladimirovich Narolin (Russian: Александр Владимирович Наролин; born 27 June 1972) is a Russian politician serving as a senator from Adygea since 2021.

== Biography ==
Alexander Narolin was born on 27 June 1972 in Krasnogvardeyskoye, Adygea. In 1994, he graduated from the Kuban State Agrarian University.

After the graduation, he began working at the regional branch of the Russian Social Insurance Fund in Adygea.

From 2008 to 2013, he was the Head of the Interdistrict Inspectorate of the Federal Taxation Service (No. 3, responsible for Adygea).

From 2013 to 2017, Narolin served as the mayor of the Maykop, the republic's capital.

He left the position in 2017 to take on the position of Prime Minister of Adygea, the second-highest office in the state.

In December 2021, he was appointed as his region's representative in the Russian Federation Council by the Head of the Republic. As Senator, he effectively voted to recognise the independence of the Donetsk and Lugansk people's republics from Ukraine. As a result, he was sanctioned by the United States, Canada, United Kingdom, European Union, Switzerland, Australia and New Zealand.
