= Oleg Seleznyov =

Russian politician (1959–2021)

- Олег Селезнёв
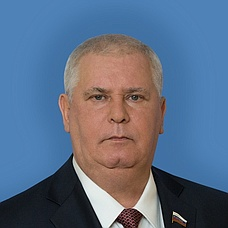

Russian Federation Senator from the Republic of Adygea
- In office 10 September 2017 – 6 October 2021
- Preceded by: Vyacheslav Shverikas
- Succeeded by: Alexander Narolin

Personal details
- Born: 22 July 1959
- Died: 6 October 2021 (aged 62) Krasnodar, Russia
- Party: Independent
- Education: Novocherkassk Higher Military Command School of Communications
- Awards: Order of Military Merit; Order of the Red Star

Oleg Viktorovich Seleznyov (Russian: Олег Викторович Селезнёв, 22 July 1959 – 6 October 2021) was a Russian politician. He served as the member of the Federation Council of the Federal Assembly as the representative for the executive authority of Adygea from 2017 until his death.

== Early life ==
Seleznyov was born on 22 July 1959. He studied at the Novocherkassk Higher Military Command School of Communications, graduating in 1980 as an officer with a higher military special education, with a specialisation as a radio communications engineer.

== Career ==
Over the course of his service in the Soviet, and later Russian Armed Forces, he was awarded the Order of the Red Star in 1987, and the Order of Military Merit in 1999. He saw service with KGB and the Federal Security Service (FSB), rising to the rank of major general. He served for a time as first deputy head of the FSB department in Krasnodar Krai, and in 2009 became head of the FSB department in Adygea. He held this post until July 2017.

On 10 September 2017, Head of the Republic of Adygea Murat Kumpilov appointed Seleznyov as a member of the Federation Council of the Federal Assembly, serving as the representative for the executive authority of Adygea. Seleznyov sat on the council's international affairs committee during his tenure.

== Death ==
Seleznyov died from COVID-19 at a Krasnodar hospital on 6 October 2021, at the age of 62, during the COVID-19 pandemic in Russia. His death was announced by the head of the Federation Council's committee on regulations, Vyacheslav Timchenko. Chairwoman of the Federation Council Valentina Matviyenko sent a telegram of condolence to Murat Kumpilov, stating Seleznyov was "a responsible and principled politician who devoted his whole life to serving the Fatherland."
