= Kazbek Paranuk =

Russian politician

Kazbek Ismailovich Paranuk was the acting prime minister of the Republic of Adygea, Russia, from 16 September 2006 until 15 January 2007. He was appointed by President Khazret Sovmen four days after Yevgeny Kovalyov was dismissed. He has previously served as mayor of Adygeysk.

Preceded by Yevgeny Kovalyov	Prime Minister of the Republic of Adygea; 16 September 2006 – 25 January 2007	Succeeded by Vladimir Samozhenkov
