= Future of Russia–New Names =

Future of Russia–New Names Будущее России — Новые имена
- Abbreviation: BRNI
- Leader: Vyacheslav Laschevsky
- Founded: 6 November 1993
- Dissolved: 1994
- Preceded by: Civic Union
- Ideology: Youth politics Social policies
- Political position: Centre
- Member parties: RSM; NPSR

Future of Russia – New Names (Russian: Будущее России — Новые имена, Budushchee Rosii – Novye imena, BRNI) was a political alliance in Russia.

== History ==
Electoral bloc "Future of Russia — New Names" was created prior to the 1993 legislative election by several youth organisations of centrist and anti-Yeltsinism orientation. The bloc had three official founders: Russian Union of Youth (RSM), politico-economic association Civic Union (GS) and Youth Movement in Support of the People's Party "Free Russia". Regional network of RSM was the core of the bloc, as association Civic Union by autumn 1993 became a "ghost organisation" (several its leaders even created their own electoral bloc) and NPSR's leader Aleksandr Rutskoy was imprisoned.

BRNI founders focused on the necessity of renewal of Russian elite. Main principles of the bloc's platform were:

- priority of human rights, national interests and society over government
- protection of property rights
- decrease and total cessation of subsidies to loss-making enterprises
- investment promotion in national economy
- development assistance to small and medium-sized businesses
- revision of the privatisation mechanism
- increase in social assistance and youth programs

On 6 November 1993 "Future of Russia — New Names" party list was approved. The list was headed by RSM first secretary Vyacheslav Lashchevsky, chairman of the council of Youth Movement "Free Russia" Oleg Sokolov and director of Institute of Politics Vladimir Mironov. Party list mainly included RSM activists, the only prominent politician in BRNI list was former people's deputy and coordinator of the Free Russia parliamentary faction Irina Vinogradova from Novosibirsk Oblast. Several regional officials were in the party list but later withdrew in favour of more establishment electoral unions, such as Choice of Russia, PRES and Civic Union. Among those candidates were Vice Chairman of the Adygea Government Valentin Lednev, Karelian Minister of Internal Affairs Igor Prokhorov, Deputy Head of Administration of Krasnodar Krai Ruslan Gunsaruk, Deputy Head of Administration of Belgorod Oblast Mikhail Goykhberg and Deputy Head of Administration of Ulyanovsk Oblast Valery Sychev

In the general election on 12 December 1993 Future of Russia — New Names received only 1.25% of popular vote and placed 11th among 13 political parties and blocs, failing to cross a 5% threshold. The only candidate to win in the single-mandate constituency was Anatoly Guskov (Lyubertsy), who joined Women of Russia faction in the State Duma. However, four candidates, who withdrew from the BRNI list, were elected as Independents: Nikolay Gen (Syktyvkar), Valentin Lednev (Adygea), Valery Sychev (Leninsky) and Andrey Zakharov (Blagoveshchensk).

After the election the bloc was transformed into Movement "New Names", led by Vladimir Mironov, Oleg Sokolov and Artyom Smolyanoy. In October 1994 Women of Russia State Duma member Yelena Chepurnykh were elected to the Presidium of Russian Social Democratic Centre from the "New Names" movement. In the 1995 election Russian Union of Youth became a co-founder of Ivan Rybkin Bloc.

== Electoral history ==
=== Federal parliamentary elections ===
Election	Leader	Votes	%	Seats	+/–	Rank	Government
1993	Vyacheslav Lashchevsky	672,283	1.25	1 / 450		11th	Opposition
