= Chegemskaya Pravda =

Russian-language newspaper in Abkhazia

Чегемская правда Chegemskaya Pravda
- 8 December 2009 front page of the Chegemskaya Pravda
- Type: Weekly
- Founder: Inal Khashig
- Editor-in-chief: Inal Khashig
- Founded: 18 June 2004
- Political alignment: Independent
- Language: Russian
- Headquarters: ul. Jonua 6 Sukhumi
- Circulation: 1100

Chegemskaya Pravda (Russian: Чегемская правда) is an independent Russian-language weekly newspaper in Abkhazia. It was founded on 18 June 2004 by Inal Khashig. It currently has a circulation of 1100 and its price is 10 ruble.

== February 2009 death threat to Inal Khashig ==
=== Initial reports ===
In February 2009 Inal Khashig was the centre of a controversy when several media, among which Caucasian Knot and Abaza TV, reported that on 6 February, while at the embankment in Sukhumi, Khashig had been invited into a car containing David Bagapsh, a nephew of Sergei Bagapsh and head of his presidential guard, Kondrat Samsonia, General Director of A-Mobile and deputy of the Sukhumi Municipal Assembly and Adgur Tarba, head of the Municipal Advertising Agency. According to the story, Khashig was then driven to a sub-urban wasteland where he was threatened the same fate as Dmitry Kholodov and Anna Politkovskaya lest he change the tone of his publications. The direct motivation for the threat was said to be the critical article Беспрограммная любовь (Love without programme) published on 3 February in Chegemskaya Pravda about the congress of United Abkhazia held on 27 January.

=== Initial reactions ===
On 18 February, 31 Journalists signed a declaration addressed to President Bagapsh in which they demanded his intervention. Likewise, opposition politicians requested the law-enforcement agencies to intervene and members of the Public Chamber called upon all political actors to settle disputes within the law only. On 19 February, Khashig's original article was republished by the Russian news agency REGNUM.

Presidential spokesman Kristian Bzhania denied the involvement of people from the president's entourage in the incident, and he said that he had spoken with Inal Khashig on the telephone and the latter had not mentioned the purported events. He also hinted that the conversation between Khashig and the three men had taken place in a waterfront cafe.

=== Khashig's statement ===
Khashig initially refused to comment on the reports. He then on 21 February released a statement in which he confirmed that the incident had taken place, while downplaying its seriousness. He denied reports which claimed that he had been taken to the woods and had been beaten. He also denied that he had been taken anywhere by car. Instead, he said that the men had walked to a deserted beach near Kelasuri and that, taking into account that he knew two of the men quite well, the conversation had not been out of line. Khashig did confirm that Kholodov and Politkovskaya had been mentioned, while saying that due to their youth the men probably did not appreciate the semantic load of these names.

Khashig stated that he had not responded to the reports earlier as he did not want to exacerbate an already dramatic situation, and that he was forced to change his mind when the story grew out of proportion. He thanked people for coming to his defence, but stressed that he did not want to be seen as a martyr or a sacrificial lamb. He also wished for the three involved men not to be regarded as crooks. According to Khashig, the principal lesson of the episode was that a journalist is free to raise any sensitive issue, and that those who feel hurt should challenge the journalist through legal channels only.

=== Bagapsh's statement ===
Following Khashig's declaration, President Bagapsh released a statement in which he said that he agreed with Khashig that problems can only be solved within the legal framework. He added that he had been concerned about the reported incident, as he had always been a staunch defender of the freedom of speech, but that he had waited with his reaction until all the facts had become clear. He condemned the opposition parties who had not done so and who had used the opportunity to "wage an information war against the government".

== June 2009 printing problems ==
In the week of 5 June 2009, the newspaper's printing house Alasharbaga refused to print it, giving the lack of profit from publishing the newspaper as its reason. Inal Khashig accused the government of being behind the action with the upcoming 12 December 2009 presidential election in mind. This was denied by Prime Minister Alexander Ankvab, who argued that Alasharbaga was a private business, and by Presidential Spokesman Kristian Bzhania, who pointed out that the newspaper had been warned in advance by its printing house and that Alasharbaga had not stopped publishing the larger government-critical newspaper Ekho Abkhazii.
