= 2009 Abkhazian presidential election =

- 12 December 2009
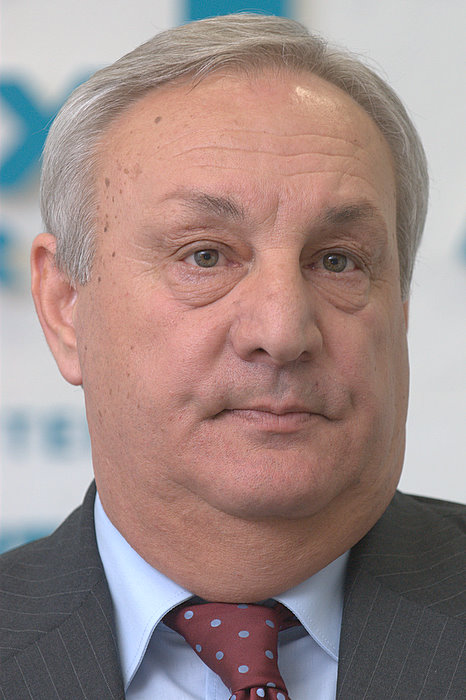

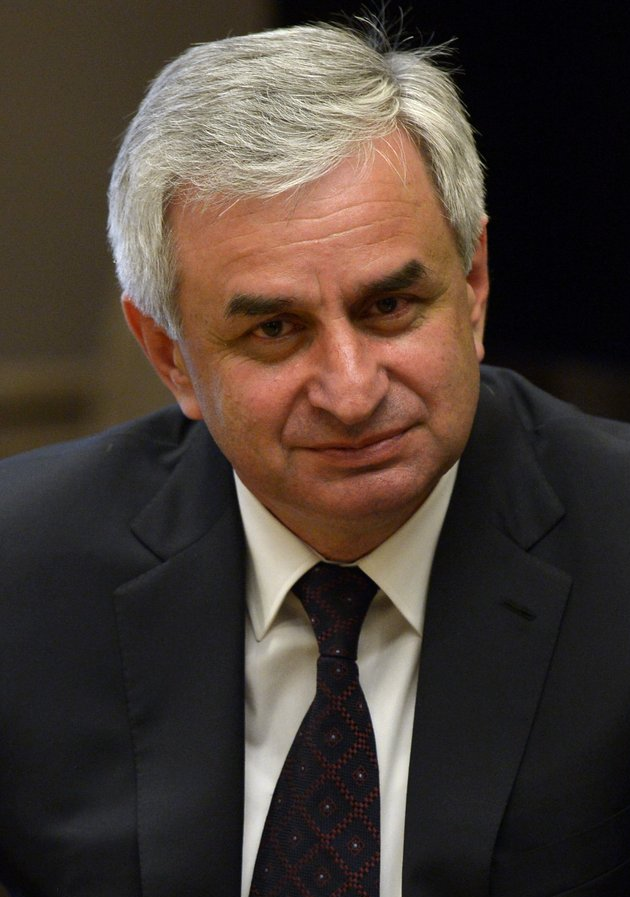
Nominee	Sergei Bagapsh	Raul Khajimba
Party	United Abkhazia	FNUA
Running mate	Alexander Ankvab	Vasilii Avidzba
Popular vote	62,231	15,584
Percentage	63.03%	15.79%
President before election
Sergei Bagapsh
United Abkhazia
Elected President
Sergei Bagapsh
United Abkhazia

Presidential elections were held in Abkhazia on 12 December 2009, the fourth such elections since the post of President of the Autonomous Republic of Abkhazia was created in 1994. The result was a victory for incumbent president Sergei Bagapsh, who received 63% of the vote, winning a second term in office. Bagapsh competed against four opposition candidates: former vice president and prime minister Raul Khajimba, who came second behind Bagapsh in the 2004 presidential election, and newcomers Beslan Butba, Zaur Ardzinba and Vitali Bganba. Khajimba had stated that he, Ardzinba and Butba would support each other should one of them reach the second round of the election. Bagapsh was inaugurated on 12 February 2010.

== Candidates ==
=== Requirements and the procedure for registration ===
According to the Law on the Election of the President of the Republic of Abkhazia, candidates for the presidency have to:

- possess Abkhazian citizenship;
- be of Abkhaz nationality;
- be fluent in the Abkhaz language;
- be no younger than 35 and no older than 65 years of age;
- be eligible to vote;
- have permanently lived in Abkhazia for the last five years up to the election day;
- have an account in a credit institution officially registered in Abkhazia.

Prospective candidates had to be nominated between 13 October and 2 November 2009. This could be done either by an interest group, which had to present a list of signatures, or by a political party registered with the Central Election Commission. The only parties registered in this way were United Abkhazia, the Forum of the National Unity of Abkhazia, the Party of the Economic Development of Abkhazia and the People's Party. After the nomination period ended on 2 November, the Central Election Commission verified the signature lists and whether candidates satisfied the set requirements. To test the nominees' proficiency in Abkhaz, it established a language commission consisting of Aleksei Kaslandzia, Batal Khagush, Eva Tania, Adgur Skinkuba and Fatima Kvarchelia. Registration of the candidates had to be completed before 12 November and two days after their registration the Central Election Commission had to publish the list of nominees whose candidacy had been approved.

=== Candidates ===
Five people were nominated for the presidency. On 5 November they successfully passed the Abkhaz language examination. Bagapsh and Khajimba were exempted from it as they had already passed a similar examination during the 2004 presidential election, but they both volunteered to undergo it anyway. On 6 November, all five nominees were officially registered as candidates, and they received their certificates on 9 November.

Presidential candidate	Career	Vice presidential candidate	Career	Political support
	Doctor of Philosophy and Economics			Nominated by an interest group on 14 October.
Vitali Resh-ipa Bganba	Doctor of Philosophy and Economics	David Dasania		Nominated by an interest group on 14 October.
	Vice president (2005–2009); Prime minister (2003–2004); Minister of Defence (2002–2003)			Nominated by an interest group on 19 October. On 20 October received the additional support of the Forum of the National Unity of Abkhazia, Aruaa and Akhatsa.
Raul Jumka-ipa Khajimba	Vice president (2005–2009); Prime minister (2003–2004); Minister of Defence (2002–2003)	Vasilii Avidzba		Nominated by an interest group on 19 October. On 20 October received the additional support of the Forum of the National Unity of Abkhazia, Aruaa and Akhatsa.
	Member of the People's Assembly (2002–2007); Businessman, owner of Abaza TV and Ekho Abkhazii		Minister of the Interior (?–?)	Nominated on 23 October by the Party of the Economic Development of Abkhazia, which he leads. Received the additional support of Iakub Lakoba, head of the People's Party and a candidate in the two previous presidential elections, and Vitali Bigvava, representative of the youth organisation Apsilaa. Campaign headed by Leon Ajinjal.
Beslan Butba	Member of the People's Assembly (2002–2007); Businessman, owner of Abaza TV and Ekho Abkhazii	Almasbei Kchach	Minister of the Interior (?–?)	Nominated on 23 October by the Party of the Economic Development of Abkhazia, which he leads. Received the additional support of Iakub Lakoba, head of the People's Party and a candidate in the two previous presidential elections, and Vitali Bigvava, representative of the youth organisation Apsilaa. Campaign headed by Leon Ajinjal.
	President (since 2005); Chairman of Chernomorenergo (2000–2005); Prime Minister (1997–1999)		Prime Minister (since 2005); Minister of the Interior (1992–1993); Businessman	Nominated on 27 October by United Abkhazia. On 18 November received the additional support of the Communist Party.
Sergei Uasyl-ipa Bagapsh	President (since 2005); Chairman of Chernomorenergo (2000–2005); Prime Minister (1997–1999)	Aleksandr Zolotinska-ipa Ankvab	Prime Minister (since 2005); Minister of the Interior (1992–1993); Businessman	Nominated on 27 October by United Abkhazia. On 18 November received the additional support of the Communist Party.
	Head of the Abkhazian state shipping company (since 1993)		Head of the Ochamchira District (?–?)	Nominated by an interest group on 29 October.
Zaur Ardzinba	Head of the Abkhazian state shipping company (since 1993)	Khripsom Jopua	Head of the Ochamchira District (?–?)	Nominated by an interest group on 29 October.

One person was nominated who subsequently withdrew his nomination:

- Jamalik Aiba. Aiba was nominated by an interest group on 23 October. On 26 October the Central Election Commission reported that Aiba had withdrawn his nomination.

== Political-background ==
=== Bagapsh, Khajimba, the 2004 election and the power-sharing agreement ===
Sergei Bagapsh and Raul Khajimba already competed for the presidency in the 2004 presidential election. That election was narrowly won by Bagapsh, but this was disputed by Khajimba and his supporters. To end the severe crisis that followed Bagapsh and Khajimba reached an agreement under which Bagapsh became president and Khajimba vice president. The arrangement was uneasy: Khajimba's Forum of the National Unity of Abkhazia remained in opposition and Khajimba on various occasions supported the opposition's criticism of government policy.

Most recently, on 20 May 2009, the Forum of the National Unity of Abkhazia, the Party of the Economic Development of Abkhazia and several other opposition groupings held a press conference in which they sharply criticised the governments foreign policy. On 28 May Khajimba announced that he agreed with the criticism and that he had filed for resignation. According to some observers Khajimba was partly motivated in his decision by the need to disassociate himself from the current authorities in the run-up to the election.

Bagapsh first addressed the matter of his candidacy when during a press conference in Moscow on 18 April 2009 he announced that he would probably make use of his constitutional right to run for a second term.

=== Beslan Butba ===
Beslan Butba is a prominent businessman and a former member of the People's Assembly. When he failed to retain his seat in the 2007 elections, he founded the Party of the Economic Development of Abkhazia and the private TV station Abaza TV. On 15 May 2009 Butba first announced that he planned to compete in the presidential election.

=== Attempts by Khajimba to form alliances with Butba and Ardzinba ===
In the run-up to the election, various opposition politicians and organisation often jointly expressed their criticism of the government. The Russian newspaper Kommersant reported that during the summer of 2009 Khajimba and Butba had entered negotiations over forming an alliance, but fell out following the visit of Russian prime minister Vladimir Putin to Abkhazia. Putin had met with Khajimba, but not with Butba, and Butba considered this an unfriendly act on the part of Khajimba.

During the nomination period for candidates, Khajimba then tried to form a team with Ardzinba. The alliance would have combined Ardzinba's backing by part of the business community and his financial resources with Khajimba's elector popularity. The pair said they would run together during two meetings with voters, and the idea was that they would receive the joint nomination by the Forum of the National Unity of Abkhazia. According to the Kommersant, in the end the pair could not agree on what positions they would get. Khajimba wanted the presidency, and offered Ardzinba to become prime minister, but this was not acceptable to the latter. The congress of the Forum of the National Unity of Abkhazia planned on 29 October was called off, and Ardzinba was instead nominated by an initiative group that day. Khajimba had already been nominated by an initiative group on 19 October.

Nevertheless, on 18 November Khajimba and Ardzinba announced that they would continue to coordinate their campaigns, and that they had appointed chairman of Aruaa Vadim Smyr to lead this coordination. On 20 November, Khajimba stated that he and Ardzinba had different visions on coming to power, but that he did not consider Ardzinba his opponent, and that in the case of a second round, he, Ardzinba and Butba would support each other.

=== Other political actors ===
==== Sergei Shamba ====
Minister for Foreign Affairs Sergei Shamba was another potential presidential candidate. Shamba had participated and come third in the 2004 election. Even though he had originally been brought into the cabinet by Khajimba over Bagapsh' preferred candidate he rejected the opposition criticism of Abkhazia's foreign policy that led Khajimba to resign.

==== Stanislav Lakoba ====
In the 2004 election, Bagapsh had run with Stanislav Lakoba as vice presidential candidate. The power-sharing deal between Bagapsh and Khajimba to end the post-election crisis meant that Lakoba could no longer become vice president. Instead, after the new election on 12 January 2005, Lakoba was appointed Secretary of the Security Council on 17 February. When Khajimba resigned as vice president on 28 May 2009 he declared that within the government he had received most support by Lakoba. On 18 August Lakoba himself handed his resignation over the Abkhazian citizenship crisis. In an interview with Caucasian Knot on 3 September Lakoba stated that he would not participate in the December 2009 presidential election and he called absurd the notion that he would join the opposition. Nevertheless, in an interview with the newspaper Nuzhnaya on 17 November, Lakoba stated that as a private citizen he supported Khajimba's candidacy and he praised his work in the Security Council. On 4 December Lakoba had a statement read out on Abkhazian television in which he stressed that this was only his private opinion and that it should not be used by any of the election campaigns.

== Campaign ==
The election campaign official began when the candidates received their registration certificates on 9 November. Since Prime Minister Alexander Ankvab was a candidate for the vice presidency, he was suspended from his post on 11 November as required by law, and his tasks were taken over by First Vice Premier Leonid Lakerbaia.

The election campaign was monitored as in previous years by the League of Voters "For Fair Elections". On 26 October, it released its first report and on 5 November it gave a press conference detailing its findings. The League released a second report on 1 December and a third report on 12 December.

The Central Election Commission was headed by Batal Tabagua, first appointed by Bagapsh's predecessor Vladislav Ardzinba during the crisis following the 2004 election. In its second report, the League of Voters "For Fair Elections", generally praised the Central Election Commission, but called upon it to be more responsive to the various complaints submitted to it, and it expressed regret that the Commission had not set up its own information service and website.

=== Political programmes ===
==== Raul Khajimba ====
On 20 November Khajimba gave a press conference in which he talked about some of his political positions. He spoke out in favour of free press and of equal access to information sources for all journalists. He promised that if he won the election he would not prosecute journalists for their view of events. Khajimba also promised to continue to fight corruption by providing decent wages and the certainty of punishment in the event of corruption. He claimed that while still in government, he had brought to light the corruption in the Sukhumi administration that cost Mayor Astamur Adleiba and several others their position, but that similar corruption in other cities had been buried by the prosecutor.

This criticism was strongly rejected by the prosecutor's office on 30 November. It claimed that the corruption in the Sukhumi administration could only be investigated properly once Khajimba's allies O.L. Berulava and T.V. Parulua had been take of the case, and that corruption in other cities had not been ignored since misdealings in the Ochamchira district administration had also been dealt with. It furthermore criticized possibly corrupt affairs during Khajimba's own time as prime minister.

Khajimba also spoke out in favour of reducing the bureaucracy by removing parallel structures in government. Concretely, he proposed removing the legal and economic departments of the presidential administration in light of the existence of the Justice and Economy Ministries, and the cutting of the position of vice president. He also criticised the recruitment of state officials on the basis of their family ties. Khajimba complained that the judiciary was not independent and he proposed that judges should be appointed by the People's Assembly and not by the president. According to the press agency Apsnypress, judges are actually already elected by Parliament, albeit upon nomination by the president.

On 11 December Khajimba gave a press conference with the Association of Media Workers. He advocated the strengthening of relations with Russia while at the same time preserving the identity of Abkhazia. Regarding the inhabitants of the Gali District, Khajimba denied that he was against granting them Abkhazian citizenship and passports but argued that this should take place according to laws reflecting the will of the people.

==== Sergei Bagapsh ====
During a visit to a school in Sukhumi on 23 November, Bagapsh stated that education and health were his priorities, that wages would probably be raised in these areas in the coming year, that it was impossible to solve all problems simultaneously and that opposition promises of raising wages to 20,000 rubles were blatant lies. His vice presidential candidate Ankvab talked about the achievements of the current government, claiming that 10,622 people had received a total of 67 million rubles in assistance. He also praised the fact that patients had been sent to Russian medical institutions to receive free treatment.

In an interview with the newspaper Respublika Abkhaziya Vice Premier Leonid Lakerbaia boasted of the sixfold increase of pensions between 2004 and 2009, the increase of pension categories from 16 to 29, the post-war high in fertility and other successes in social policy.

==== Zaur Ardzinba ====
On 24 November Ardzinba gave a press conference in which he stated that if he were elected President, he would do everything to bring together the fragmented people of Abkhazia and to remove the divide between 'us' and 'them'. He also declared that he would make use of qualified people in the government administration, from all political camps.

On 11 December, Ardzinba declared that while the power-sharing agreement that resolved the 2004 post-election crisis had meant to bring an end to the division in the Abkhazian society, it had in fact failed to do so, and that he meant to correct that. Ardzinba also spoke out against the size of the bureaucracy, lamenting the duplication of functions.

=== Media use ===
==== TV broadcasts ====
Each candidate received four hours of free air time on national television in the four weeks running up to election day. During the first week (from 16 to 20 November) candidates had to either address voters live and answer questions from voters or send in a pre-recorded DVD. In the second week the candidates, assisted by no more than five associates, would answer questions of voters present in the studio, or send in a pre-recorded DVD. In the third week the vice presidential candidate had to answer questions from voters. In the last week the presidential candidate again had to address voters live and answer questions.

Apart from these broadcasts, each candidate could also buy one commercial not longer than three minutes, which would be broadcast on national television three times daily.

The private channel Abaza TV, owned by Beslan Butba, also offered equal amounts of airtime to all candidates.

The League of Voters "For Fair Elections" criticised both the State Radio and TV and Abaza TV for unequal coverage of the election. It noted that the State TV had shown in detail meetings of United Abkhazia, the party of incumbent president Bagapsh, and that Abaza TV had broadcast directly from the Congress of the Party of the Economic Development of Abkhazia, the party of its owner Beslan Butba. Both broadcasts had featured clear agitation in support of the parties' candidates and against the other candidates.

==== Newspapers ====
Most newspapers of Abkhazia campaigned for one of the candidates, with Edinoy Abkhazii, Amtsakhara and Respublika Abkhaziya on the side of incumbent president Bagapsh, and Ekho Abkhazii, Forum, Novy Den and Nuzhnaya on the side of the opposition. The League of Voters "For Fair Elections" condemned the unbalanced and incomplete reporting in both pro-government and pro-opposition papers. It particularly condemned the fact that Butba had replaced all the journalists of his newspaper Ekho Abkhazii by political activists. It also criticised an article by Daur Achugba in Forum for its gross unsubstantiated accusations against the government and President Bagapsh in particular, and its statements directed against a national minority.

=== Public contract ===
With input from all involved parties, the Public Chamber drafted a ten-point social contract to regulate election conduct, which it opened up for signing from 13 till 18 November. On the first day, head of the Public Chamber Natela Akaba expressed her puzzlement that it had not yet been signed by any of the candidates or the heads of the election campaigns. On 18 November, Khajimba and Ardinba stated that they would sign the social contract if and only if Bagapsh were to sign it.

In its second report on 1 December, the League of Voters "For Fair Elections" acknowledged that there had been some flaws in the way the Public Contract had been drafted, but it nevertheless criticised President Bagapsh for refusing to sign it.

=== Unlawful campaigning ===
==== Use of administrative resources ====
Government officials were by law forbidden to participate in the election campaign.

In its first report, the League "For Fair Elections" admonished certain government officials for calling on voters to vote for President Bagapsh. In its second report, the League specifically singled out the Minister of Education and the Mayor of Sukhumi for participating in Bagapsh's campaign. It furthermore judged that while the General Prosecutor had a right to correct incorrect accusations by opposition candidates, he had gone beyond that and his statements too could be considered campaigning for Bagapsh. The league criticised the opposition for the fact that members of the People's Assembly had appeared in the campaigns of Khajimba and Ardzinba.

The League also condemned the call of some leaders of the Armenian community on all Armenians to vote for President Bagapsh, and a more covert but similar call for support for Bagapsh by Vice Premier Alexander Stranichkin during a conference of the Union of Russian Nationals.

On 20 November, Khajimba complained to the Central Election Commission that Bagapsh was trying to influence the election by ordering state-employees to make copies of their passports.

On 25 November the Central Election Commission responded to Khajimba's complaint. It stated that it had not received any concrete examples by Khajimba, but that it had nevertheless investigated the copying of passports in the Sukhumi City Hospital, which had been mentioned by Khajimba in his press conference on 20 November. According to the Central Election Commission, passports had been copied in the context of a human resource program of the health ministry initiated in 2008 involving all medical personnel in Abkhazia, and the matter was thus unrelated to the election campaign.

==== Use of foreign nationals in campaigns ====
Abkhazian election law forbade foreign nationals from taking part in the election campaign.

On 20 November, Khajimba complained to the Central Election Commission that in one of Bagapsh's election videos on TV, foreign nationals had campaigned for him. According to the press agency Apsnypress, the video had indeed featured several Russian nationals speaking approvingly of Bagapsh, although they did not explicitly recommend voting for him.

In its second report, the League "For Fair Elections" also criticised the fact that the first president of Adygea Aslan Dzharimov had participated in Bagapsh's campaign. It also considered Beslan Butba's employment of Russian spin doctors to be in breach of the constitution.

==== Other violations ====
In its press conference on 5 November the League of Voters "For Fair Elections" condemned United Abkhazia and the Party of the Economic Development of Abkhazia for having started campaigning before the official start of the election campaign when the candidates were registered.

Opposition candidates complained that on 23 November, their election posters were torn in Gagra.

In its second report, the League condemned the campaigns of Ardzinba and Butba for using recordings of ordinary citizens without their consent.

=== Abkhazian citizenship dispute ===
The 2009 presidential election was the first in which voters could only use their Abkhazian passport to identify themselves. This disenfranchised mostly the Georgian part of Abkhazian society, since the majority of Georgians does not have Abkhazian citizenship. In the run-up to the election, President Bagapsh attempted to extend the number of Georgians eligible for Abkhazian citizenship, but had to abandon these plans under opposition protests, and the government decided to suspend until after the election the issuing of new passports to residents of the Gali District, where most Georgians live.

This last decision was sharply and repeatedly criticised by the League "For Fair Elections" as violating the Constitution of Abkhazia. It strongly recommended that the sides should come to agree that the suspension be lifted before the election, and it criticised the opposition for its unwillingness to do so. The League also considered the general ambiguous effects of making the Abkhazian passport the sole document granting participation in the election. It praised the increased overall transparency but lamented the electoral exclusion of most inhabitants of the Gali District, pointing out the fact that only 3500 inhabitants of the Gali District would be able to participate in the election, whereas 25,000, 12,000 and 15,000 inhabitants of the Gali District had voted in the elections of 1999, 2005 and 2007. The League warned that the legitimacy of the election would be judged on the basis of the participation of ethnic minorities.

On 24 November, Ardzinba, Khajimba and Butba complained to Minister of Internal Affairs Otar Khetsia that the State Passport Service had refused to provide them with the number of Abkhazian passport holders, divided out by district and nationality, the number of passport holders abroad and the number of Abkhazian citizens under the age of 18. Specifically, the trio requested anonymised passport data for the Gali District.

=== Fire incidents involving Beslan Butba's campaign ===
On 19 November, in Gagra the car of Vitali Azhiba burned down, head of the regional branch of Beslan Butba's Party of the Economical Development of Abkhazia. On 20 November a building burned down in the village of Aradu in the Ochamchira District, said by Butba's campaign to be the district office of the agro-industrial complex 'Aradu', owned by Butba. Butba condemned the events on 21 November as "planned political provocations, aimed at destabilising the situation in Abkhazia and intidating society". They were labeled 'terrorist attacks' by Aruaa, "aimed at intimidating voters and destabilising the country". It lamented "the inability of authorities to ensure the safety of citizens and the rule of law in such a challenging period for our nation and state" and it warned that should the government not in the course of the following days take decisive steps towards resolving the crimes, Aruaa would consider it partly to blame for the resulting civil unrest.

Minister of the Interior Otar Khetsia stated on 21 November that criminal cases had been opened by law enforcement agencies in Gagra and Aradu. He noted that Azhiba's car had stood along the road at a far distance from his home, and while he confirmed that fire had broken out, he cautioned that it was up to the investigation to establish whether the car had exploded or been set fire to. Khetsia also confirmed that a warehouse for kiwifruit had burned down in Aradu, and that everything would be done to find the perpetrators, but he expressed his surprise at the fact that reporters from Abaza TV (owned by Butba) had been at the crime scene before officers from the Ochamchira police department.

The prosecutor's office declared on 30 November that the incidents were under investigation, and it condemned accusations of government involvement, warning that it would prosecute any attempts to destabilise the situation.

In its second report, the League of Voters "For Fair Elections" called alarming the burning incidents and it called for an impartial, thorough and speedy investigation.

=== Possible election fraud ===
Some of the opposition candidates have repeatedly speculated that the government might try to rig the election. On 20 November, Khajimba requested to know the number of eligible voters abroad. and also on 20 November, Zaur Ardzinba requested of the Central Election Commission that it publish the names of the members of the central, district and divisional election commissions, including those abroad.

On 11 December Khajimba gave a press conference with the Association of Media Workers. He expressed his conviction that all opposition candidates would conduct their activities within the law, but he accused the government of planning fraud and of using its administrative resources to support the campaign of Bagapsh. He claimed that if he had used the administrative at his position when he was prime minister, he would have won the 2004 election. He also denied that he had received any Russian support during that election, and praised the fact the Russian government was not supporting any candidate now. He did not exclude the possibility that the opposition would start street protests should the government manipulate the election.

Likewise, Ardzinba said on 11 December that while the 2004 election had been 'stolen', the opposition would not allow that to happen this time.

Conversely, in its second report the League of Voters "For Free Elections" condemned the campaign of Butba for soliciting voters to sign a 'contract' in which they committed themselves to voting for Butba during the election. The League also reported receiving unconfirmed reports of vote buying.

On 3 December Head of the Central Election Commission Batal Tabagua also stated that although no official complaints had been made, reports had come in concerning the bribing of voters. He warned that if this turned out to be true, the candidate in question would be excluded from the election.

== Conduct ==
On 7 October 2009, the date of the election was set by the People's Assembly to be 12 December. The voting was structured through the 35 electoral districts of Abkhazia, comprising a total of 174 polling stations. Two of these were stationed in Russia – in Moscow and Cherkessk – they were officially part of electoral district no. 5 in Sukhumi. Their election commissions were appointed by Abkhazian Ambassador to Russia Igor Akhba. Ten days before election day, on 2 December, lists of voters were distributed. On 10 and 11 December, the ballot papers were handed out to the election commissions.

On Election Day, the voting stations were open from 08:00 until 20:00. The Abkhazian passport was the only document voters could use to identify themselves. To prevent multiple voting, the passports of voters were stamped on page 17. On 7 December, there were 146,121 holders of an Abkhazian passport, of which 9910 were under the age of 18 and thus ineligible to vote, and 5759 lived outside Abkhazia. The total number of eligible voters was estimated at 127,000.

Raul Khajimba was the first of the candidates to vote, at 9:00, followed by Sergei Bagapsh at 9:30. Beslan Butba intended to vote at 10:00 but had to come back late due to the huge crowd at the polling station.

At 12:00, the turn-out was 21%, at 15:00 it was 40.77%.

The results of the election are to be published no later than three days after the election, that is, 15 December. If a second round is necessary, it is to be held no later than two weeks after the first round, that is, before 26 December.

On 1 December the Public Chamber of Russia announced that it would send a delegation to Abkhazia from 11 to 13 December to monitor the election. On 8 December it was announced that also the State Duma and various Russian NGOs would send delegations during that period.

== Results ==
According to the final results, Bagapsh won in the first round with over 60% of the vote.

Candidate	Party	Votes	%
Sergei Bagapsh	United Abkhazia	62,231	63.03
Raul Khajimba	Forum for the National Unity of Abkhazia	15,584	15.79
Zaur Ardzinba	Independent	9,296	9.42
Beslan Butba	Party for the Economic Development of Abkhazia	8,395	8.50
Vitali Bganba	Independent	1,326	1.34
Against all		1,893	1.92
Total		98,725	100.00
Valid votes		98,725	97.02
Invalid/blank votes		3,031	2.98
Total votes		101,756	100.00
Registered voters/turnout		138,447	73.50
Source: Kavkaz-Uzel

== International reactions ==
Georgia – The election was condemned as illegal on 20 November by the Central Election Commission of Georgia, which considers Abkhazia to be part of its territory. On 11 December the spokesperson of Georgia's president Mikheil Saakashvili called the election an immoral Kremlin-staged comedy.

Russia – Two polling stations were opened in Russia for local Abkhazian citizens to vote in the elections. After the election results were announced, Russian prime minister Vladimir Putin and President Dmitry Medvedev congratulated Bagapsh for his victory.

United States – The Department of State called the elections illegitimate and illegal, and reiterated its support for Georgia's sovereignty and territorial integrity.

== Inauguration and formation of a new government ==
President Bagapsh announced on 13 December that his reinauguration would take place on 12 February 2010.
