= ANNA News =

Russian pro-government news agency

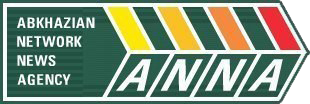
- Industry: News media
- Founded: 18 July 2011; 15 years ago
- Founder: Marat Musin
- Headquarters: Moscow, Russia (Abkhazia until 2017)
- Number of employees: 50 (as of 2013)
- Website: www.anna-news.info

ANNA News (Analytical Network News Agency) is a Russian pro-Kremlin news agency. The agency's name ANNA used to stand for "Abkhazian Network News Agency"; after the head office moved to Moscow, when registering in Roskomnadzor on 22 September 2017, "Abkhazian" was changed to "Analytical".

== History ==
ANNA News was officially registered as mass media in Abkhazia on 18 July 2011 after the events of the Abkhaz–Georgian conflict. It was founded and managed by Marat Musin until his death in May 2018. Musin was a specialist in financial intelligence who worked at Moscow State University and at the Russian State University of Trade and Economics.

The agency takes a pro-Kremlin position, and is part of a wider network of outlets that amplifies Russian propaganda. ANNA publishes in the Russian language and is known for being "a voracious purveyor of insider YouTube footage of the Syrian civil war since 2012"; ANNA embedded with the Syrian Arab Army in their operations against rebels. It has been known for publishing footage recorded directly from Syrian Army tanks. In January 2013, a Russian judge and a former military intelligence officer Sergey Berezhnoy survived being shot while accompanying ANNA crew in the Damascus suburb of Darayya, Syria. Berezhnoy said that he participated in the coverage of the military operation in Syria as a writer. According to a 2018 publication from the Moscow Psychological and Social University, ANNA News works with officers of the information confrontation group of the Russian Reconciliation Center for Syria.

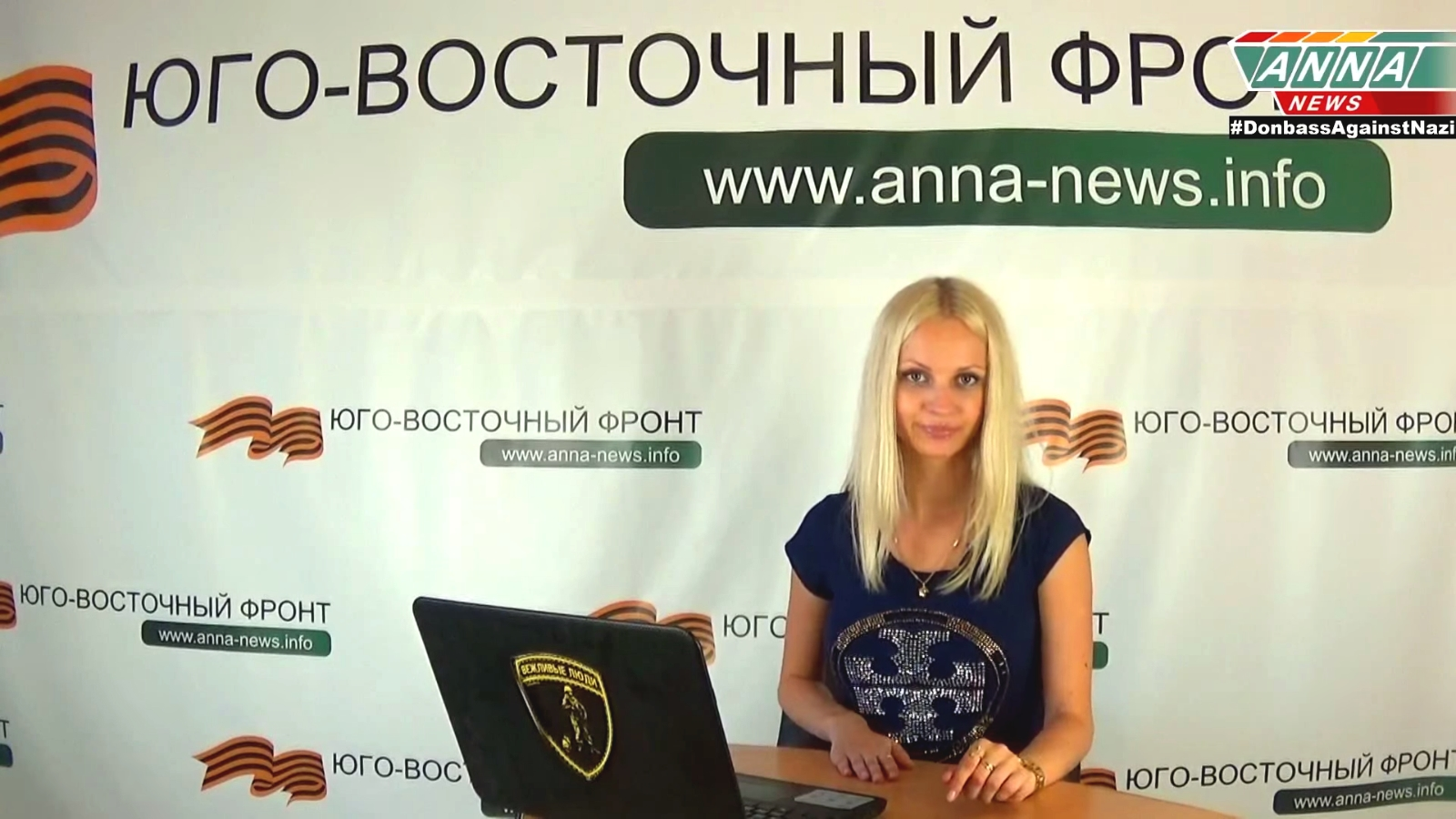
Anchor Helen Krasovskaya with latest news of Novorossiya, 9 August 2014 (at background a title "South-Eastern Front")

ANNA journalists were also embedded with Russian-backed separatists fighting the Government of Ukraine since 2014.

In May 2020, ANNA News was banned from YouTube for violating its terms of service. It was revealed that employees of ANNA also worked for Russian propaganda websites NewsFront and SouthFront, and that NewsFront had raised money for ANNA in 2014. Both ANNA News and SouthFront support separatist forces in Ukraine. In August 2021, president of Ukraine Volodymyr Zelenskyy, based on the decision of the National Security and Defence Council, signed a decree "on the application of personal special economic and other restrictive measures" against ANNA News. The decision ordered the web resources of the news agency to be blocked.

== Content ==
According to U.S. intelligence officer T. S. Allen, Pascal Andresen and the Ukrainian magazine Political Life, it is engaged in influence operations and is a propaganda tool. According to The Moscow Times newspaper, it has a 'forceful pro-Assad slant.' Professor of Arabic language and civilisation Stéphane Valter writes that the way the news agency diffuse their images "clearly indicates a bias in favour of the Syrian regime."

In June 2014, ANNA News falsely claimed that political advisor Jen Psaki had been fired from the US State Department. In the fall of 2014, the agency published a fake photo of several dead people who were allegedly killed by the Ukrainian authorities.

On 5 January 2017, ANNA News falsely claimed that the jihadist organisation Al-Nusra Front, which fought against the Syrian authorities, calls the White Helmets volunteer organisation "soldiers of the revolution".

In February 2017, ANNA News claimed that Ukraine was the source of a leak of radioactive iodine-131. The news agency did not provide any evidence.

In late 2017, ANNA News journalist Oleg Blokhin based in Syria created staged photos to substantiate the existence of a fake private military company Turan. After it was discovered that the photos were fake, ANNA removed all of Blokhin materials from its website. Oleg Blokhin categorically rejected the claims of Russian research group Conflict Intelligence Team that the PMC Turan, fighting in Syria, is a fiction created by him. He also mentioned that neither he nor ANNA News have ever released information about "Turan", since he doesn't comment on information of any Russian units in Syria at all.

== See also ==
- Internet Research Agency
- Apsnypress
