= Grigory Senin =

Russian politician

- Григорий Сенин

Member of the State Duma
- In office 17 December 1995 – 2003

Personal details
- Born: Grigory Nikolayevich Senin; 27 April 1947 (age 78) Prikalausky, Russian SFSR, Soviet Union
- Party: Communist Party of the Russian Federation

Grigory Nikolayevich Senin (Russian: Григорий Николаевич Сенин; born 28 April 1947), is a Russian politician who served as a member of the State Duma for its second and third convocations from 1995 to 2003.

== Biography ==
Grigory Senin was born on 28 April 1957, in Prikalausky, Petrovsky District, Stavropol Krai into a family of rural teachers. In 1979, he graduated from the Moscow Forestry Institute. From 1979 to 1980, he was the master of the transport workshop of the production woodworking association "Apsheronsk". From 1980 to 1982, he served in the Soviet Army. Between 1982 and 1995, he worked in the production furniture-drilling association "Druzhba": the master of the site, and was the head of the workshop of Maykoplesprommemeube JSC Druzhba (Maykop).

In December 1993, Senin ran for the State Duma's first convocation, taking second place, with 19.7% of the vote and losing to Valentin Lednev. On 17 December 1995, he became a member of the State Duma's second convocation. In 1999, he was re-elected to the State Duma for its third convocation. On 26 January 2000, he joined the agro-industrial committee group. He left the Duma in 2003.

Senin was the Second Secretary of the Adyghe Republican Committee of the Communist Party of the Russian Federation. From 2006 to 2011, he was a member of the State Council of the Republic of Adygea's 4th convocation.

== Family ==
Senin is married and has two children.
