= Prime Minister of the Republic of Adygea =

Governmental position

As of 2007, the Prime Minister of the Republic of Adygea is the most senior official within the Adyghean State Assembly.

Name	Took office	Left office
Nikolay Pedan	19 April 1995	19 February 1997
Mukharby Tkharkakhov	19 February 1997	March 2001
Nikolay Avdiyenko	March 2001	14 February 2002
Khazret Khuade	14 February 2002	6 March 2002
Nikolay Demchuk	6 March 2002	24 January 2003
Gennady Mikichura	24 January 2003	20 August 2003
Khazret Khuade	20 August 2003	17 November 2004
Skhatby Vorokov	17 November 2004	30 December 2004
Asfar Khagur	30 December 2004	30 May 2006
Yevgeny Kovalyov	30 May 2006	16 September 2006
Kazbek Paranuk	16 September 2006	25 January 2007
Vladimir Samozhenkov	15 January 2007	12 May 2008
