= List of chairmen of the State Council of the Republic of Adygea =

Chairmen of the State Assembly of the Republic of Adygea

== Chairman of the Supreme Soviet (from 1993: The Legislative Assembly) ==
Name	Period
Adam Tleuzh	March 16, 1992–January 1996

== Chairman of the State Assembly ==
Name	Period
Yevgeny Salov	January 1996–March 2001

== Chairmen of the Council of the Republic ==
Name	Period
Mukharby Tkharkhakov	March 2001–January 2002
Anatoly Ivanov	January 2002–April 2003
Mukharby Tkarkhakhov	April 20, 2003–March 2006

== Chairman of the Council of Representatives ==
Name	Period
Tatiana Petrova	March 2001–March 2006

== Chairmen of the State Council ==
Name	Period
Ruslan Khadzibiekov	March 2006–2007
Mugdin Chermit (Acting) ?	2007–2008
Anatoly Ivanov	May 2008–March 2011
Fedor Fedorko	March 30, 2011–March 8, 2012
Mohamed Ashev	March 8, 2012–January 16, 2013
Vladimir Narozhny	January 16, 2013 – Present

== Sources ==
- Official website
