= Vladimir Samozhenkov =

Russian politician

Vladimir Mikhaylovich Samozhenkov (born 1950) is the Prime Minister of the Republic of Adygea, Russia. He was appointed by Aslan Tkhakushinov on December 21, 2006.

Preceded by Kazbek Paranuk	Prime Minister of the Republic of Adygea; 15 February 2007 – present	Succeeded by incumbent
