= Vladislav Reznik =

Russian businessman and politician (born 1954)

Vladislav Matusovich Reznik
- Владисла́в Ма́тусович Ре́зник
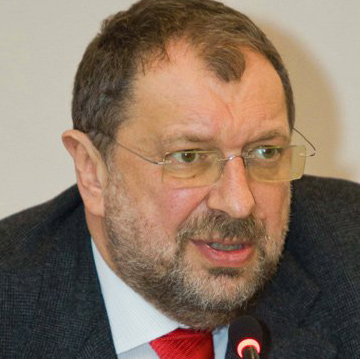

Member of the State Duma
- Incumbent
- Assumed office 18 January 2000
- Preceded by: Multi-member district
- Constituency: Adygea-at-large (No. 1) (2016-); Party List Seat (2000-2016)

Personal details
- Born: 17 May 1954 (age 72) Leningrad, Russian SFSR, Soviet Union
- Occupation: Businessman; politician

Vladislav Matusovich Reznik (Russian: Владисла́в Ма́тусович Ре́зник; born 17 May 1954) is a Russian businessman and politician. He is the chairman of the insurance company Rus, member of the general council of the United Russia political party, Chairman of the State Duma Committee on Finances, former chairman of Rosgosstrakh.

== Early life and education ==
Reznik was born 17 May 1954 in Leningrad.

He graduated from the Biological Department of Leningrad State University in 1976. He holds a Kandidat degree in biology. In 1979-1987 he worked as a researcher in the All Union Research and Development Technological Institute for Antibiotics and Medical Ferments in Leningrad.

== Early career ==
In 1987-1989 he became a Deputy Director General of Russkoye Video firm. In 1989-1990 he is a Deputy Chairman of Rossiya Bank (established by the Communist Party of the Soviet Union). Since 1990 Reznik is the head of the insurance company Rus. As the head of Rus, Reznik was an employer of the young lawyer Dmitri Medvedev, future President of Russia. In 2002, he sold his stake in Rus for $10 million. In 1995-1998 Reznik was the Chairman of main Russian state-owned insurance company Rosgosstrakh. Since 1995 he is a director of Obi-bank bank and since 1996 he is a director of Mosbiznesbank.

== Political career ==
In 1999 Reznik was elected to the State Duma as a member of the Unity political party. He is a member of the United Russia since its formation by a merger of Unity and the Fatherland – All Russia. In 2001 he became the deputy chairman of the United Russia party. He was responsible for the economical program of the party.

In 2003 Reznik was re-elected to the State Duma. In Duma Reznik became the Chairman of the Committee on Finances. He was the main author of the 2006 law On preventing laundering of the income from criminal activities and financing of terrorism establishing stricter control over bank operations.

=== The Spanish Case ===
In 2008 a case was filed by Spanish Interpol against a group of Russians, which included a civil servant Vladislav Reznik. The investigation had lasted almost 11 years, the suspects were accused of “money laundering”. The Investigation Department of the MOI refused to institute criminal proceedings because the financial documents presented by the accused were clean, and the transaction that prompted the filing of the case was completely legal.

On February 19, 2018, a trial took place in a Spanish court, where Reznik was acquitted of all charges.

In October 2018, the National Court of Spain dropped the charges against all the Russians, involved in the case, including the deputy of the State Duma, Chairman of the Committee on Finances Vladislav Reznik. The acquittal was based on the fact that the evidence presented by the investigators did not confirm the accusations thus making them unfounded. Tax returns and other documents, which were presented to the court by Vladislav Reznik's defense, confirmed that all of the politician's income was completely legal and transparent.

=== Sanctions ===
In April 2018, the United States imposed sanctions on Reznik and 23 other Russian nationals. On 11 March 2022 the United Kingdom sanctioned Reznik in relation to Russia's actions in Ukraine. He has also been sanctioned by Canada, the European Union, Monaco, Switzerland, Australia and Japan.

== Personal life ==
Reznik's wife is Diana Gindin. She graduated from New York University, received an MBA from Columbia University, and worked at banks Lehman Brothers and Morgan Stanley.
