= Zaur Ardzinba =

Zaur Ardzinba (Заур Джотович Ардзинба; 8 May 1950 – 15 April 2015) was a businessman from Abkhazia who unsuccessfully ran for President in the 2009 election.

== 2009 election ==
=== Attempt by Khajimba and Ardzinba to form an alliance ===
In the run-up to the election, various opposition politicians and organisation often jointly expressed their criticism of the government. The Russian newspaper Kommersant reported that during the nomination period for candidates, Raul Khajimba and Ardzinba negotiated about running together. The alliance would have combined Ardzinba's backing by part of the business community and his financial resources with Khajimba's electoral popularity. The pair said they would run together during two meetings with voters, and the idea was that they would receive the joint nomination by the Forum of the National Unity of Abkhazia. According to Kommersant, in the end, the pair could not agree on the positions they would get. Khajimba wanted the Presidency, and offered Ardzinba the position of Prime Minister, but this was not acceptable to the latter. The congress of the Forum of the National Unity of Abkhazia, planned for 29 October, was called off, and Ardzinba was instead nominated by an initiative group on the day. An initiative group had already nominated Khajimba on 19 October.

Nevertheless, on 18 November, Khajimba and Ardzinba announced that they would continue to coordinate their campaigns and had appointed Vadim Smyr, chairman of Aruaa, to lead this coordination. On 20 November, Khajimba stated that he and Ardzinba had different visions for coming to power, but that he did not consider Ardzinba his opponent; and in the case of a second round, he, Ardzinba, and Butba would support each other.

=== Nomination ===
Zaur Ardzinba was nominated by an initiative group on 29 October, with former Ochamchira District Governor Khrips Jopua as Vice-Presidential candidate.

=== Election campaign ===
On 20 November, Zaur Ardzinba requested that the Central Election Commission publish the names of the members of the central, district and divisional election commissions, including those abroad.

On 24 November, Ardzinba gave a press conference in which he stated that if elected President, he would do everything to bring together the fragmented people of Abkhazia and remove the divide between 'us' and 'them'. He also declared that he would utilize qualified individuals from all political camps in the government administration.

On 11 December, Ardzinba declared that while the power-sharing agreement that resolved the 2004 post-election crisis had been intended to bring an end to the division in Abkhazian society, it had in fact failed to do so, and that he meant to correct that. He added that while the 2004 election had been 'stolen', the opposition would not allow that to happen this time. Ardzinba also spoke out against the size of the bureaucracy, lamenting the duplication of functions.

== Result ==
According to the official result, Ardzinba came in third place, garnering 9296 votes (9.14% of the total).

== Death ==
Ardzinba died on 15 April 2015 at the age of 64.
