= Anatoly Ivanov (politician, born 1950) =

Russian politician (born 1950)

Chairman of the State Council of the Republic of Adygea
- In office 15 May 2008 – 13 March 2011
- Preceded by: Ruslan Hajebiyokov
- Succeeded by: Fyodor Fedorko

Personal details
- Born: September 19, 1950 (age 75) Buryat ASSR, Soviet Union
- Party: Communist Party of the Soviet Union; United Russia
- Education: Sakhalin State University (1981); Rostov State University (1996)

Anatoly Georgievich Ivanov (born 19 September 1950) is a Russian politician and a five-term deputy to the State Council of the Republic of Adygea. From 2008 to 2011, Ivanov was the State Council's chairman.

== Early life and career ==
Anatoly Ivanov was born on 19 September 1950 in Buryatia (then part of the Soviet Union, now Russian Federation). He is of Russian ethnicity.

From 1968 to 1970, Ivanov carried out military service in the Soviet Army. Upon completing military service, he enrolled in an industrial-pedagogical institute in Chita, where he studied until 1973 but did not receive a degree. From 1973 to 1974, Ivanov worked at a power station in Chita before being elected to the Chita Central Council of People's Deputies in 1975.

From 1975 to 1981, Ivanov studied at Sakhalin State University (then Yuzhno-Sakhalinsk State Pedagogical Institute), where he graduated with a teaching degree in history and social science. From 1981 to 1988, Ivanov worked at a vocational school in Yuzhno-Sakhalinsk.

In 1988, Ivanov moved to Adygea, where he worked in Maykop first at a vocational school, and later as the head of a nursing home for the elderly and disabled.

== Political career ==
In 1990, Anatoly Ivanov was elected as a deputy to the Maykop City Council of People's Deputies. Ivanov was elected to the first parliament of the Republic of Adygea in 1991, and was re-elected to the second and third parliaments in 1996 and 2001 respectively.

In March 2006, the parliament was reformed into the State Council of the Republic of Adygea, and Ivanov was elected for a fourth term as part of the United Russia group.

From 2006 to 2008, Ivanov was the deputy chairman of the State Council, and in 2008 was elected chairman. He served as chairman until 2011.

Following the end of his time as chair, Ivanov stood for re-election (once again as part of the United Russia group) and was elected for a fifth term on the State Council.

== Personal life ==
Ivanov is married and has a son.
