= Hazret Sovmen =

Russian politician (born 1937)

- Хазрет Совмен; Шъоумэн Хьазрэт
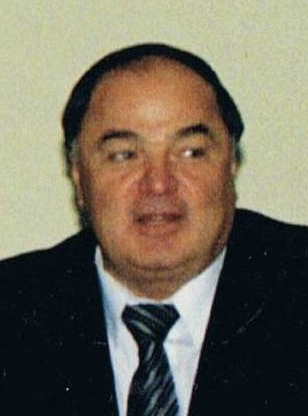
- Sovmen in 2001

2nd President of the Republic of Adygea
- In office 8 February 2002 – 12 January 2007
- Preceded by: Aslan Dzharimov
- Succeeded by: Aslan Tkhakushinov

Personal details
- Born: 1 May 1937 (age 88) Afipsip, Takhtamukaysky District, Adyghe AO, Russian SFSR, Soviet Union
- Party: United Russia
- Profession: Businessman, professor
- Awards: Order of Merit for the Fatherland; Order of the Badge of Honour Order of Honour and Glory of Abkhazia

Hazret Medzhidovich Sovmen (Adyghe: Шъэумэн Хьазрэт Меджидэ ыкъор [ʂawman ħaːzrat]; Russian: Хазре́т Меджи́дович Совмен; born 1 May 1937) was the second president of the Republic of Adygea, Russia, having succeeded Aslan Dzharimov at the post. Sovmen is a university professor from Maykop. Before becoming President, Hazret Sovmen had been a successful businessman (with links to Russian entrepreneurs in Siberia), having started off as a bulldozer driver in a gold mine in Chukotka. He is the founder of Polyus Gold, Russia's leading gold-mining company.

== Early life ==
Sovmen was born in the aul of Afipsip in Takhtamukaysky District of Adyghe Autonomous Oblast in the Russian SFSR, Soviet Union. He served in the Black Sea Fleet and graduated from the Saint Petersburg Mining Institute. He started working at a gold mine in Chukotka in 1961 and worked in mines in the Krasnoyarsk Krai and Magadan Oblast. He became manager of the Polyus Mine in 1981. As president, he was the only regional head without any spouse.

== Political career ==
Sovmen was elected to the office of President on 13 January 2002 by direct suffrage. He was faced with the challenges of leading one of Russia's poorest republics, officially declared bankrupt by the Government of Russia. Sovmen was involved in political activities with the Slavic people Union, Adygeya's principal opposition party. Russian President Vladimir Putin is believed to have supported Sovmen. In 1997, Russian President Yeltsin awarded him with the Order of Merit for the Fatherland 3rd class. On 13 January 2007, he was succeeded as Adygean President by Aslan Tkhakushinov.

He is a member of the United Russia party.

Preceded by Aslan Dzharimov	President of the Republic of Adygea; 8 February 2002 – 13 January 2007	Succeeded by Aslan Tkhakushinov
