= Murat Kumpilov =

Head of the Republic of Adygea

- Мурат Кумпилов; КъумпӀылэ Мурат
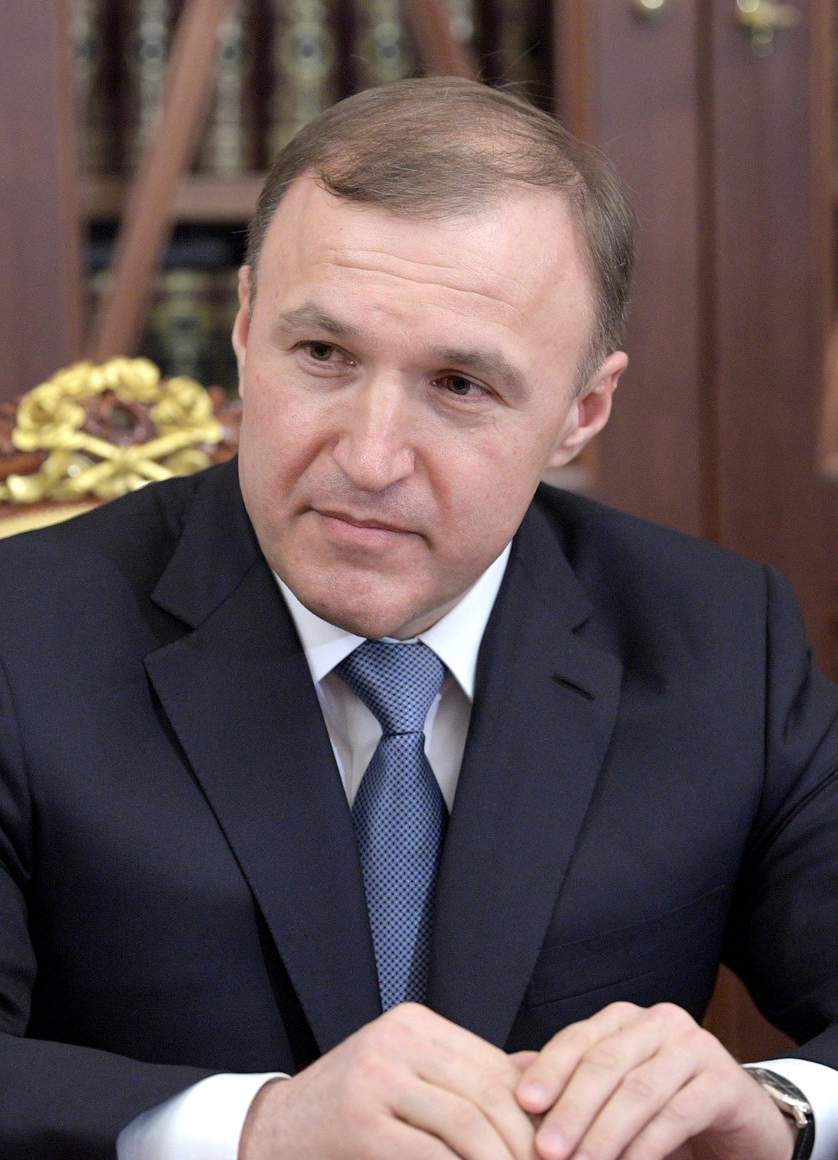
- Kumpilov in 2017

4th Head of the Republic of Adygea
- Incumbent
- Assumed office 12 January 2017
- Preceded by: Aslan Tkhakushinov

Chairman of the State Council of the Republic of Adygea
- Preceded by: Vladimir Narozhny
- Succeeded by: Vladimir Narozhny

Personal details
- Born: Murat Karalbyevich Kumpilov; 27 February 1973 (age 53) Ulyap, Krasnogvardeysky District, Adyghe Autonomous Oblast, Russian SFSR, Soviet Union
- Party: United Russia

Murat Karalbiyevich Kumpilov (Adyghe: КъумпӀылэ Мурат, romanized: Qump'ılə Murat; Russian: Мурат Каральбиевич Кумпилов; born on 27 February 1973) is a Russian politician and economist serving as Head of the Republic of Adygea since 12 January 2017. He previously served as prime minister of the republic from 2008 to 2016.

== Career ==
Murat Kumpilov was born in the village of Ulyap of the Krasnogvardeysky District in the Adyghe Autonomous Oblast on 27 February 1973. In 1989, he graduated from Ulyap secondary school number 9. In 1994, three years after the collapse of the Soviet Union, Kumpilov graduated from Rostov Institute of National Economy with a degree in "Economics and entrepreneurship". He became an engineer at Promagros Purchasing and Sales Association in Rostov-on-Don. In the same year, he was made Chief Auditor-Controller of the Krasnogvardeisky Office of the Federal Treasury of the Ministry of Finance of the Republic of Adygea. In 2008, Kumpilov was appointed as acting deputy prime minister of the Republic of Adygea, and then promoted to acting prime minister. Later he was appointed Prime Minister of the Republic. On 19 September 2016, Kumpilov was elected as a member of the State Council of the Republic of Adygea. However, he was relieved of his duties in connection with his election as a deputy of the State Council. On 3 October 2016, he was elected to the Chairman of the State Council of the Republic of Adygea. On 12 January 2017, after Aslan Tkhakushinov left his post, Russian president Vladimir Putin, appointed Kumpilov as the acting head of the Republic of Adygea. On 10 September 2017, the parliament of Adygea unanimously elected him as head of the republic. He was re-elected unanimously for a second term on 11 September 2022.

Preceded by Aslan Tkhakushinov	President of the Republic of Adygea; January 13, 2017 – Present	Succeeded by Incumbent
