= Turan Group =

Fake Muslim Russian private military company in Syria

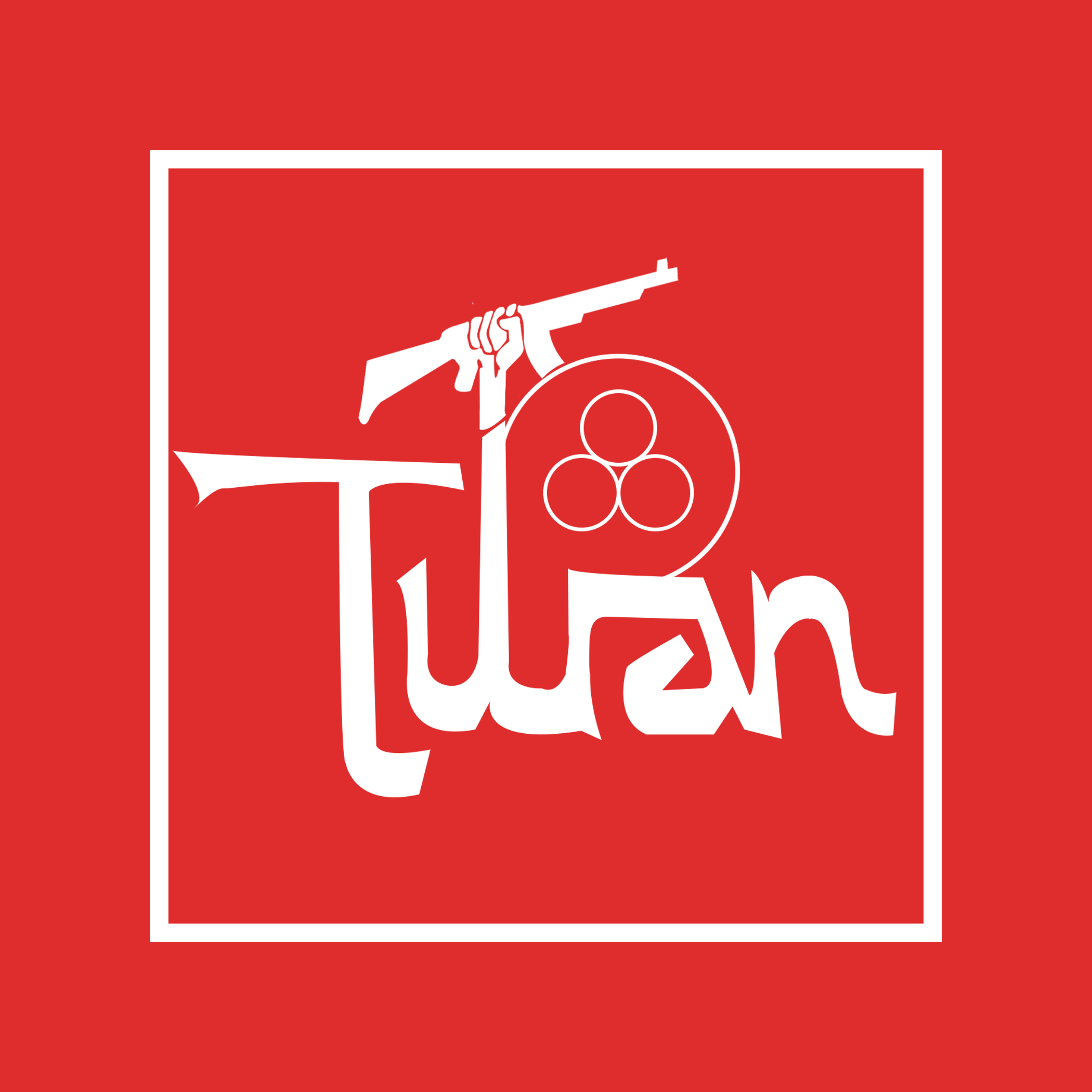
Turan group logo

The Turan Group (Russian: Группа Туран, romanized: Gruppa Turan) is a fake Muslim Russian private military company in Syria. For unknown reasons, the existence of Turan was fabricated by a Russian journalist and others through staged photographs and Photoshop. It is described as a hoax.

According to a September 2018 report from the Chr. Michelsen Institute, contractors of another Russian PMC active in Syria called the Wagner Group who were asked about Turan have never heard of its existence.

== History ==
The group was supposedly founded in the spring of 2017 Central Asian, Russian and other former Soviet nationals with Special Forces and general military background. The group was described as similar to another Russian PMC active in Syria called the Wagner Group, but that many of its recruits were Central Asians who had adopted Shiite beliefs and were therefore recruited to go to Syria to fight alongside other Shiite militia groups such as Hezbollah. An Estonian-born Russian national using the pseudonym Ivan who said he was affiliated with the group claimed that Russian speaking Arabs with Hezbollah patches had recruited on behalf of the organization, individuals from the former Soviet Union, offering recruits US$15,000 to fight for 8 months in Syria against ISIL.

== Gear ==
Members of the group were reported to use NATO weapons such as M4 Carbines, and to wear black, red and blue stripes on their shirts with "Turan" inscribed on them and patches with a clenched fist holding a Kalashnikov type rifle, similar to Hezbollah's logo. The group was also said to venerate Tamerlane and the Timurid Empire, including using Timurid symbols among their own.
