= Radio SOMA =

- Sukhum; Abkhazia
- Broadcast area: Abkhazia
- Frequency: 107.9 MHz

Programming
- Language: Russian
- Format: Music

Ownership
- Owner: Independent

History
- First air date: 31 December 1997

Technical information
- Transmitter coordinates: 42°58′34″N 41°03′59″E

Links
- Website: www.radiosoma.com

Radio SOMA (Russian: Радио СОМА) is a Russian-language musical FM radio station based in Abkhazia. It is Abkhazia's only independent radio station.

== History ==
The first broadcast started on 31 December 1997. Radio SOMA was founded by Zurab Ajinjal, who first had the idea to launch the station in 1997.

== Broadcasts ==
The station broadcasts usually 24 hours a day on 107.9 MHz in Abkhazia. The studio of Radio SOMA is located in a building of the Abkhazian State University.

Radio SOMA is a partner of Voice of Russia.

Radio SOMA is a partner of Conciliation Resources in their South Caucasus Radio Diaries project.

In 2004 Radio SOMA prepared the cd Абхазия – взгляд изнутри (Abkhazia – A Look Inside) meant to describe today's life in Abkhazia.
