= Aslan Dzharimov =

Russian and Adyghe politician

- Аслан Джаримов; Джарымэ Аслъан
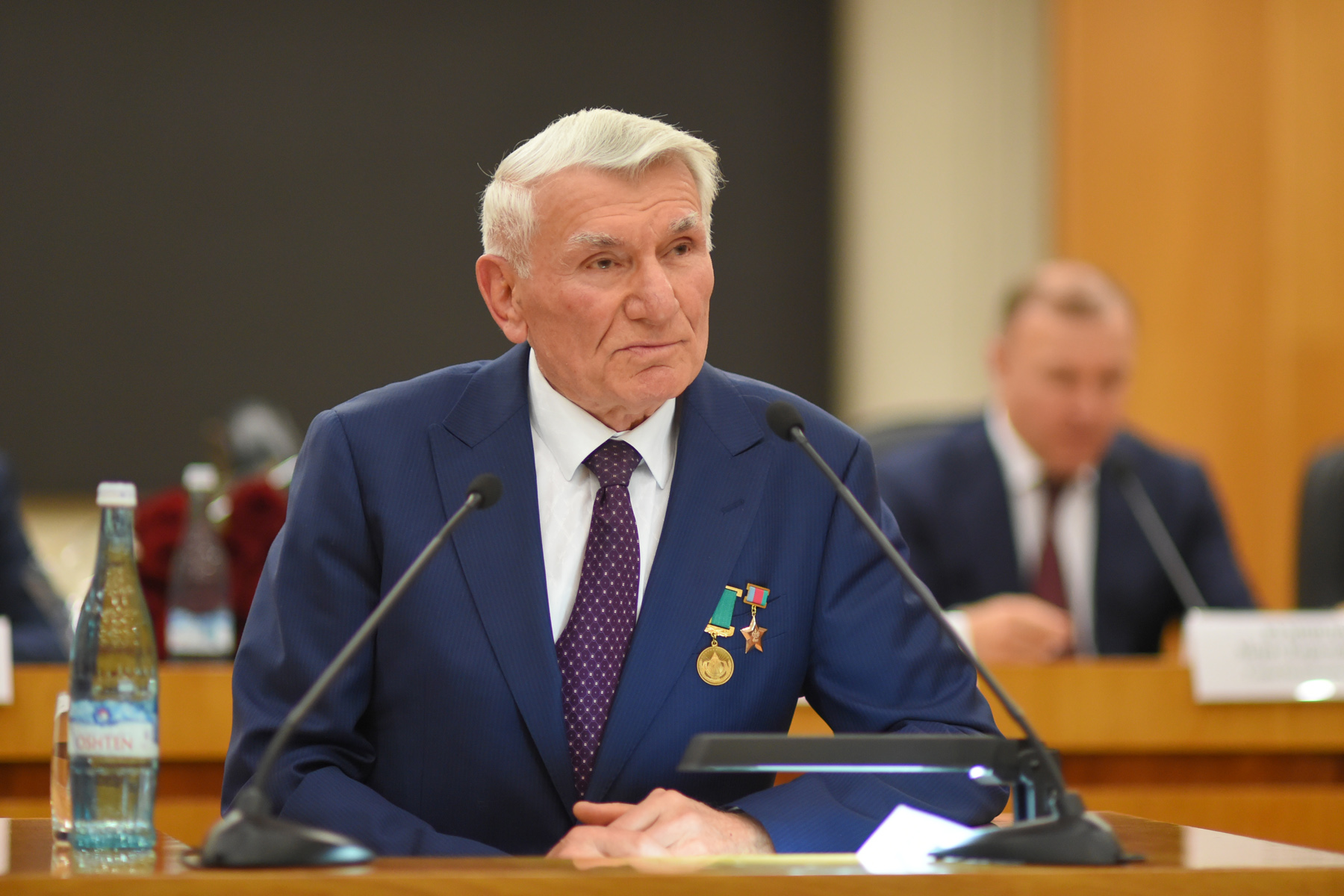
- Dzharimov in 2019

1st President of Adyghe Republic
- In office 5 January 1992 – 8 February 2002
- Preceded by: Position established
- Succeeded by: Hazret Sovmen

Personal details
- Born: May 17, 1936 (age 89) Koshekhablsky District, Adyghe Autonomous Oblast, RSFSR, USSR
- Party: Communist Party of the Soviet Union (1969-1991)
- Spouse: Fatima Dzharimova
- Children: Angela Dzharimova, Bela Dzharimova
- Profession: Agronomist
- Awards: Order of Merit for the Fatherland; Order of Friendship; Order of the Badge of Honour Order of Honour and Glory of Abkhazia

Aslan Aliyevich Dzharimov (Adyghe: Джарымэ Аслъан Алые ыкъор [d͡ʒaːrəjma aːsɬaːn aːləja əqʷar]; Russian: Аслан Алиевич Джаримов) is a Russian politician who served as the first president of the Adyghe Republic from 1992 to 2002.

== Education ==
He graduated from the agronomy department of the Kuban Agricultural Institute in 1964 and received a post-graduate degree in agricultural economics in 1968. He also graduated from the CPSU Central Committee’s Academy of Social Sciences in 1985.

== Political activity ==
Dzharimov is the only leader in the history of Adygea to occupy all three top party and government positions (both under the communist government of the USSR and the democratic government of modern Russia), successively holding the posts of First Secretary of the Adygea Regional Committee of the CPSU, then Chairman of the Council of People's Deputies of the Adygea Autonomous Region and President of the Republic of Adygea.

He was a member of the CPSU from 1956 until it was banned in August 1991.

== Positions ==
From 1968 to 1970, Dzharimov was the head of the planning and economic department of the Adyghe Regional Department of Agriculture.

From 1970 to 1973, he was the deputy head of the Department of Agriculture of the Adyghe Regional Committee of the CPSU.

From 1973 to 1975, he was the director of the Adyge Regional State Agricultural Experimental Station.

From 1975 to 1980, he was the head of the Department of Agriculture and Food Industry of the Adyghe Regional Committee of the CPSU.

From 1980 to 1984, he was the secretary of the Adyghe Regional Committee of the CPSU (supervised issues of the agro-industrial complex).

From 1984 to 1987, he was the head of the Department of Agriculture and Food Industry of the Krasnodar Regional Committee of the CPSU.

From 1987 to 1989, he was the secretary of the Krasnodar Regional Committee of the CPSU.

From 1989 to 1991, he was the first secretary of the Adyghe Regional Committee of the CPSU.

From 1990 to 1992, he was the chairman of the Adyghe Regional Council of People's Deputies.

He was elected a people's deputy of the USSR for the national-territorial district N703 (Adygea), was a member of the Deputy group of communists. In 1990 he was a delegate to the Constituent Congress of the Communist Party of the RSFSR and the XXVIII Congress of the CPSU. At the Second Congress of People's Deputies of the USSR in December 1989, he opposed the inclusion on the agenda of the question of the abolition of Article 6 of the Constitution of the USSR.

On October 5, 1990, at a session of the regional Council of People's Deputies, the Autonomous Soviet Socialist Republic (ASSR) of Adygea was proclaimed as part of the RSFSR.

== Family ==
He is married and has two daughters.

He is a master in Sambo. In 2000, he (representing Russia) became the world champion in Sambo among veterans in the weight category of over 100 kilograms.

Preceded by Position created	President of the Republic of Adygea; 17 January 1992 – 8 February 2002	Succeeded by Hazret Sovmen
