= Aslan Tkhakushinov =

Former Adyghe President

- Аслан Тхакушинов; ТхьакIущынэ Аслъан
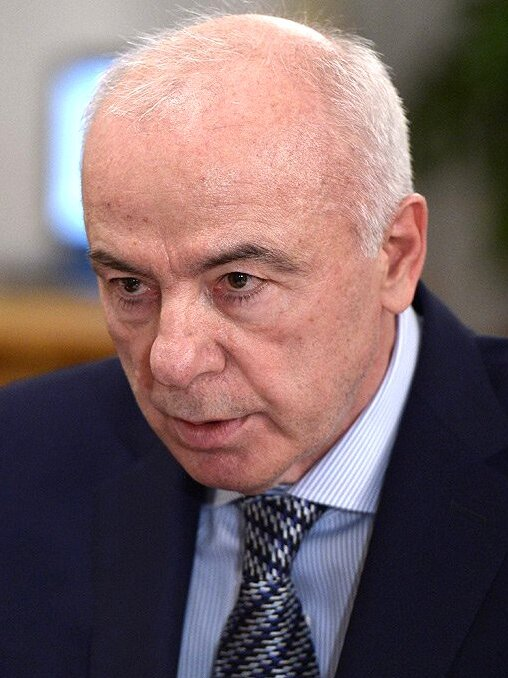
- Tkhakushinov in 2014

3rd Head of the Republic of Adygea
- In office 13 January 2007 – 12 January 2017
- Prime Minister: Vladimir Samozhenkov
- Preceded by: Hazret Sovmen
- Succeeded by: Murat Kumpilov

Personal details
- Born: 12 July 1947 (age 79) Krasnodar Region, RSFSR, USSR
- Party: United Russia
- Spouse: Lyudmila Ramazanovna Tkhakushinova
- Children: 1
- Profession: Russian Teacher
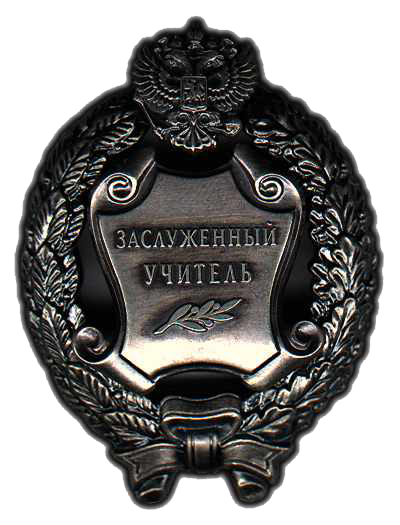
- Awards: Order of Merit for the Fatherland; Order of Honour (Russian Federation) Honored Teacher of the Russian Federation

Aslan(cheriy) Kitovich Tkhakushinov (Russian: Асланчерий Китович Тхакушинов; Adyghe: ТхьакIущынэ Аслъанджэрий Кытэ ыкъор [tħaːkʷʼəɕəna aːsɬaːn kəta əqʷar]; born 12 July 1947) is the former Head of the Republic of Adygea, Russia, and is an ethnic Adyghe.

Tkhakushinov was born in the aul of Ulyap in Krasnogvardeysky District and graduated in 1971 from the Adyghe State Pedagogical University. He obtained a degree in Sociology from the same university in 1977. He worked at the Maykop State Technical University from 1983 to 2006 becoming president of the university in 1994.

He was a deputy on Maykop City Council from 1981 to 1990. He was elected to the legislature of Adygea in 1990.

Tkhakushinov is active in meeting with the members of the Circassians diasporas, and trying to solve the problem of the Circassians compatriots living abroad. In December 2010, he issued a decree to elaborate a program to help resettling the compatriots living in diaspora, whom want to return voluntarily to the motherland.

Tkhakushinov visited different countries with an effective Circassians diasporas, such as his visit to Jordan in 1997.

On 12 January 2017, Tkhakushinov left his post as the republics president. Russian president Vladimir Putin, appointed Murat Kumpilov as the acting head of the Republic of Adygea.

He is married and has a son.

Preceded by Hazret Sovmen	President of the Republic of Adygea; 13 January 2007 – 12 January 2017	Succeeded by Murat Kumpilov
