= Valentin Lednev =

Russian politician

- Валентин Леднев
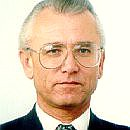

Member of the State Duma
- In office December 1993 – 17 December 1995

Personal details
- Born: Valentin Petrovich Lednev; 29 June 1941 (age 84) Krasnaya Ulka, Russian SFSR, Soviet Union

Valentin Petrovich Lednev (Russian: Валентин Петрович Леднев; born 29 June 1941), is a Russian politician who served as a member of the State Duma's first convocation from 1993 to 1995.

== Biography ==
Valentin Lednev was born on 29 October 1941 into the family of kolkhoz farmers. In 1956, he was a horse driver at the Maykop brick factory No. 2. In 1957, he studied at the Railway School in Leninakan. After graduation in 1959, he worked as a fitter of electric motor train No. 703 in Kursk. From 1960 to 1967, he was an electrician of the Adyghe plant of building materials and oak mill.

From 1967 to 1972, Lednev worked in the Maykop city committee of the Komsomol. Between 1972 and 1986, he was the head of the housing and household work department of the Adyghe regional soviet, chairman of the soviet of the Adyghe regional collective farm construction association. In 1975, he graduated from the correspondence department of the energy faculty of Krasnodar Polytechnic Institute, as an electromechanical engineer in automation.

From 1986 to 1992, Lednev was the Chairman of the City Committee of the Trade Union of Employees of the Agro-Industrial Complex, Chairman of the Coordinating Council of Trade Unions (Maykop). Having been elected to the City Council of People's Deputies, he became the coordinator of the "Action" group, formed by deputies who were in opposition to the Communist Party and were reform-minded. In October 1992, he became Deputy Chairman of the Cabinet of Ministers - Government of the Republic of Adygea, and in April 1993, he was simultaneously the Minister of Social Protection of the Population of the Republic of Adygea.

In the elections to the State Duma's first convocation, Lednev was nominated by the Union of the Slavs of Adygea, the Democratic Party of Russia, the Kuban Cossack army and trade unions. He was included in the list of support of the "Choice of Russia" electoral bloc in the Adygea constituency N1 (Republic of Adygea). In 1993, he was elected a member of parliament, a deputy of the State Duma of the first convocation. In the Duma he was part of the faction "Choice of Russia". He was a member of the Committee on Labor and Social Support, and Chairman of the Subcommittee for Social Service and Invalid Affairs. He was the curator and one of the main authors of the laws "On Veterans".

In March 1994, Lednev became a member of the initiative to create the Democratic Choice of Russia party. On 11 January 1995, he left the “Choice of Russia” faction and joined the deputy group “Stability”. In December 1995, he ran for election to the State Duma's second convocation, again in the Adygea constituency No. 1, but lost the election lost to Grigory Senin. By the end of 1996, he was the Head of the Department of the Ministry of Social Protection of Russia. In 1996, he became the Deputy Head of the apparatus of the State Duma Committee on Labor and Social Policy.

In 1999, Lednev ran for the State Duma's third convocation, and was included in the general Federal list of electoral associations of the Liberal Democratic Party of Russia (No. 28 in the southern regional group). On 11 October 1999, the Central Executive Committee refused to register the Liberal Democratic Party of Russia's federal list. The LDPR also nominated Lednev as a candidate for the Adygea single-mandate constituency No. 1 (Republic of Adygea). He was not elected. In 2001, he was the Executive Secretary of the Expert Council on urban planning activities of the State Duma Construction and Housing and Public Utilities. Since 2012, he is the assistant to State Duma member Sergey Petrov.

== Family ==
Lednev was married and has two daughters.
