= Abaza TV =

Abaza TV is a television station operating in Abkhazia. It is owned by businessman and politician Beslan Butba. It claims to have an independent editorial policy that is not aligned with either the government or the opposition of Abkhazia. The station broadcasts twice a day in Russian and has a news roundup once a week.
