= Apsnypress =

State press agency

Apsnypress Апсныпресс Аҧсныпресс
- Type: State-owned
- Industry: News agency
- Founded: 31 January 1995
- Headquarters: Sukhumi, Abkhazia
- Key people: Renata Chagava, Director
- Website: www.apsnypress.info

Apsnypress is the de facto state press agency of Abkhazia. Its stated goals is to assist in development of democracy, sovereignty and independence of the breakaway Abkhaz republic and to ensure the information security thereof.

== Detailed objectives ==
Apsnypress is dedicated to collecting, processing, publishing and distributing information pertaining to all sorts of events taking place in Abkhazia or otherwise concerning it. Its other activities include:

- Establishing trends; modeling the development of political and socio-economic tendencies
- Collaborating with the foreign media; accommodating the foreign journalists
- Developing the media network within the republic and abroad
- Improving the staff's professional skills; continuously recruiting of the journalists with knowledge of Russian, Abkhaz and English languages
- Prompt publishing of the Abkhazian laws, presidential decrees and cabinet's decisions; its analysis, generalization and studying and publishing the responses to thereof
- Prompt publishing of statements and appeals by the government bodies and its officials.
- Reflecting the broad array of opinions regarding the important political, socio-economic and cultural events of Abkhazia.
- Preparing and distributing the daily news bulletins
- Preparing and distributing the press reviews
- Organizing the press-conferences and briefings for the senior government officials
- Information activities in the fields of TV and radio broadcasting; preparation of the self and jointly produced TV a radio programmes
- Carrying out the sociological studies, surveys and analyzing thereof

== History ==
Apnypress was founded on 31 January 1995.

Following the May 2014 Revolution and the election of Raul Khajimba as President, on 23 September 2014 he replaced Manana Gurgulia as Head of Apsnypress with Renata Chagava.
