= Head of the Republic of Adygea =

Highest-ranking official in Adygea, Russia

- Standard of the head of the Republic of Adygea

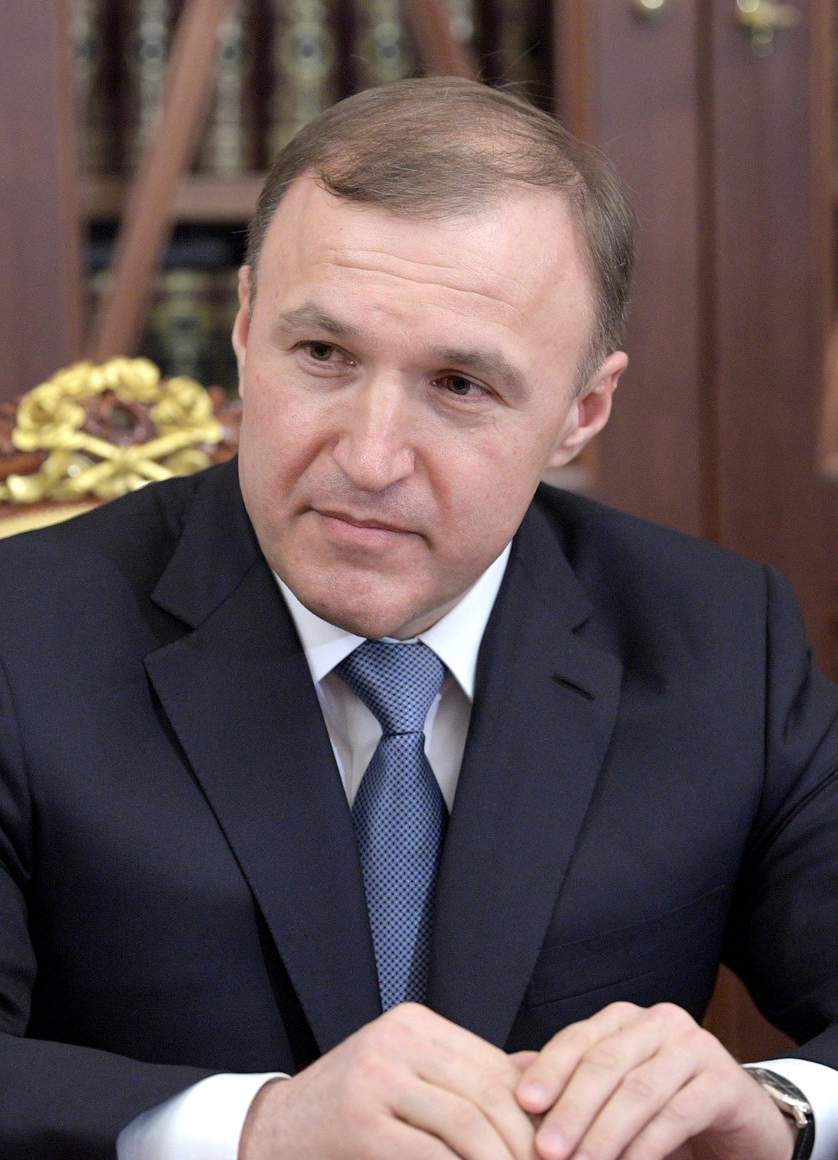
- Incumbent; Murat Kumpilov since 12 January 2017
- Executive branch of the Republic of Adygea
- Style: His Excellency; The Honorable
- Type: Governor; Head of state; Head of government
- Residence: Building of the Administration
- Seat: Maykop
- Appointer: President of Russia with the consent of the State Council
- Term length: Five years, renewable once
- Precursor: First Secretary of the Communist Party of Adygea
- Formation: 5 January 1992
- First holder: Aslan Dzharimov
- Website: www.adygheya.ru

The head of the Republic of Adygea (Russian: Глава Республики Адыгея; Adyghe: Адыгэ Республикэм илӀышъхьэ) is a head of Adygea, federal subject of Russia. Until May 2011, the position was called President of the Republic of Adygea (Russian: Президент Республики Адыгея; Adyghe: Адыгэ Республикэм ипрезидент).

== History ==
The position of the President of the Republic of Adygea (until March 24, 1992 - Adygean ASSR) was introduced in accordance with the Declaration of State Sovereignty of Adygean ASSR on June 28, 1991. In December 1991 - January 1992 (in two rounds), the elections of the first President of the Republic was held in Adygea. On October 19, 1994, the members of the Constitutional Commission prepared a draft of the new constitution of the republic and submitted for the approval by the State Council. After a discussion, the session of the State Council adopted the draft and submitted it for the nationwide discussion. March 6, 1995, after 4.5 months of national discussion and two-time consideration in the State Council, the draft version of the Constitution was submitted for final consideration and adoption by the State Council members. By the adoption of the new constitution after the numerous discussions the powers and the duties of the President of Adygea was fixed.

On December 28, 2010, the Federal Law was adopted, which establishes that the name of highest official of the Federal subjects of the Russian Federation (the head of the highest executive body of the state) cannot contains the titles and phrases that constitute the name of the position of the head of state - the President of the Russian Federation. This law establishes until January 1, 2015 a long period during which the constitutions and charters of the Russian federal subjects must be brought into line with it.

On April 20, 2011 at the second meeting of the State Council of Adygea, members approved the introduction of amendments to the Constitution of the republic to replace the name “President of the Republic of Adygea” with “Head of the Republic of Adygea”.

== Selection process ==
=== Election ===
The Head of the Republic is elected by the members of the State Council of Adygea from candidates submitted by the President of Russia.

==== Last election ====
Candidate	Party	Votes	%
Murat Kumpilov	United Russia	48	100%
Alexander Loboda	A Just Russia	0	0%
Shamsuddin Pshizov	Independent	0	0%
Total		48	100%
Registered voters/turnout		50	96.0%

=== Inauguration ===
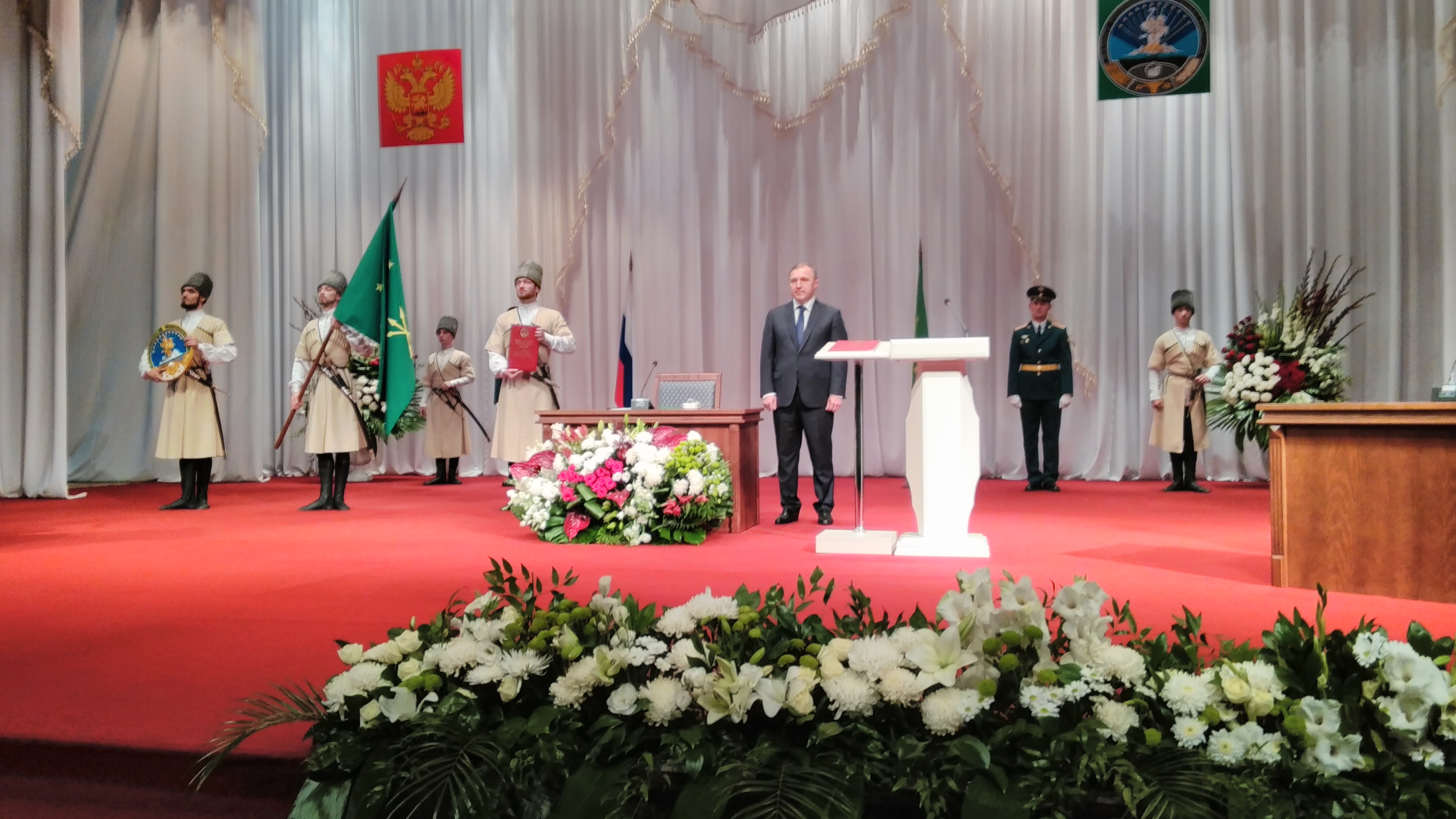
2017 Inauguration of Murat Kumpilov

The head of the Republic shall take office at the meeting of the state Council, the day in which he was elected.

Before executing the powers of the office, the Head of Republic is constitutionally required to take the oath:

I solemnly swear to the multinational people of Adygeya in the execution of powers of the Head of the Republic of Adygea to abide by the Constitution of the Russian Federation, the Constitution of the Republic of Adygea, to respect and protect the rights of man and citizen, to implement in good faith vested in me by the people duties.

== Powers ==
According to the Constitution of the Republic Adygea, Head of the Republic:

- define key directions of domestic policy and foreign economic relations of the Republic of Adygea in accordance with the Constitution of Russia, Federal laws, the Constitution of Adygea and the laws of Adygea;
- provides for the rights and freedoms of citizens, lawfully in the territory of Adygea, security and territorial integrity of Adygea;
- represents the Republic of Adygea in relations with Federal bodies of state power, bodies of state power of subjects of the Russian Federation, bodies of local self-government and the implementation of foreign economic relations, the right to sign contracts and agreements on behalf of the Republic of Adygea;
- concluding agreements on mutual transfer of part of powers of Executive bodies of state power of the Russian Federation and the Republic of Adygea;
- exercises the right of legislative initiative in the State Council - Khase Republic of Adygea;
- submit to the State Council - Khase of Republic of Adygeya the Republican budget of the Republic of Adygea, the program of socio-economic development of the Republic of Adygea, as well as reports on their implementation;
- directs the annual message to State Council - Khase Republic of Adygea;
- h) promulgate constitutional laws, the laws of the Republic of Adygea, identifying the promulgation of the constitutional laws by signing or special act, or rejects the laws;
- entitled to participate in the work of the State Council - Khase of Republic of Adygeya with the right of Advisory vote;
- ensure the coordination of activities of Executive authorities of the Republic of Adygea and other bodies of state power of the Republic of Adygea and in accordance with the legislation of the Russian Federation organizes the interaction of the Executive authorities of the Republic of Adygea with the Federal Executive authorities and their territorial bodies, local self-government bodies and public associations;
- the right to demand convocation of an extraordinary meeting of the State Council - Khase Republic of Adygea, as well as to convoke the newly elected State Council - Khase of Republic of Adygeya for the first meeting, informed of the deadline set for this State Council - Khase of Republic of Adygeya Constitution of the Republic of Adygea;
- may apply to the State Council - Khase of Republic of Adygeya with the offer on modification and (or) additions in the decision of the State Council - Khase of Republic of Adygeya, or their cancellation, and also has the right to appeal these decisions in court;
- determines the structure of Executive bodies of state power of the Republic of Adygea in accordance with the Constitution of the Republic of Adygea;
- may preside at meetings of the Cabinet of Ministers of the Republic of Adygea;
- forms the Cabinet of Ministers of the Republic of Adygea and make a decision on his resignation, appoints with the consent of the State Council - Khase of Republic of Adygeya Prime Minister of the Republic of Adygea; the Vice Prime Minister of the Republic of Adygea; the heads of the Executive authorities of the Republic of Adygea in charge of Finance, economic development, social protection and agriculture, and also dismiss them from office;
- appoints and dismisses the other leaders of the Executive authorities of the Republic of Adygea in accordance with the Federal legislation and the legislation of the Republic of Adygea;
- decides on the granting of powers of the Senator - representative from Executive government authority of the Republic of Adygea;
- has the right to suspend or cancel acts of the Cabinet of Ministers of the Republic of Adygea, ministries and other Executive bodies of the Republic of Adygea in case of contradiction of the Constitution of the Republic of Adygea, the laws of the Republic of Adygea and the acts of the head of the Republic of Adygea;
- takes part in the formation of the constitutional Court of the Republic of Adygea in accordance with the law of the Republic of Adygea, as well as the Central election Commission of the Republic of Adygea in the manner prescribed by Federal law and the law of the Republic of Adygea;
- appoint official representatives of the Republic of Adygea and dismiss them from office;
- appoints and dismisses the Commissioner for the rights of the child in the Republic of Adygea;
- appoints and dismisses the Commissioner for the protection of the rights of entrepreneurs in the Republic of Adygea;
- has the right to appeal to the constitutional Court of the Republic of Adygea and the constitutional Court of the Russian Federation;
- shall bestow state awards of the Republic of Adygea and confers honorary titles of the Republic of Adygea;
- forms a unified Administration of the head of Republic Adygea and the Cabinet of Ministers of the Republic of Adygea;
- exercise other powers in accordance with Federal laws, the Constitution of the Republic of Adygea and the laws of the Republic of Adygea;
- can dissolve the state Council of the Republic of Adygea.

== List ==
This is the list of individuals that serve the office.

=== Republic of Adygea ===
No.	Portrait	Name (born–died)	Term of office			Political party	Election	Ref.
No.	Portrait	Name (born–died)	Took office	Left office	Time in office	Political party	Election	Ref.
1		Aslan Dzharimov (born 1936)	5 January 1992	8 February 2002	10 years, 34 days	Independent	1991–1992	
1		Aslan Dzharimov (born 1936)	5 January 1992	8 February 2002	10 years, 34 days	Our Home – Russia	1997	
2		Hazret Sovmen (born 1937)	8 February 2002	13 January 2007	4 years, 339 days	United Russia	2002	
3		Aslan Tkhakushinov (born 1947)	13 January 2007	12 January 2017	9 years, 365 days	United Russia	2007 (Note: Appointed by the President of Russia with the consent of the State Council); 2011	
–		Murat Kumpilov (born 1973)	12 January 2017	10 September 2017	241 days	United Russia	— (Note: Appointed by the President of Russia as Acting Head of Republic)	
4		Murat Kumpilov (born 1973)	10 September 2017	Incumbent	8 years, 362 days	United Russia	2017 (Note: Indirect election); 2022	
