= State Council of the Republic of Adygea =

Regional parliament of Adygea, Russia

State Council — Khase of the Republic of Adygea Государственный совет — Хасэ Республики Адыгея
- 7th legislature

Type
- Type: Unicameral

Leadership
- Chairman: Vladimir Narozhny, United Russia since 14 January 2017

Structure
- Seats: 50
- Political groups: United Russia (41) CPRF (5); LDPR (3) SRZP (1)

Elections
- Last election: 19 September 2021
- Next election: 2026

Meeting place
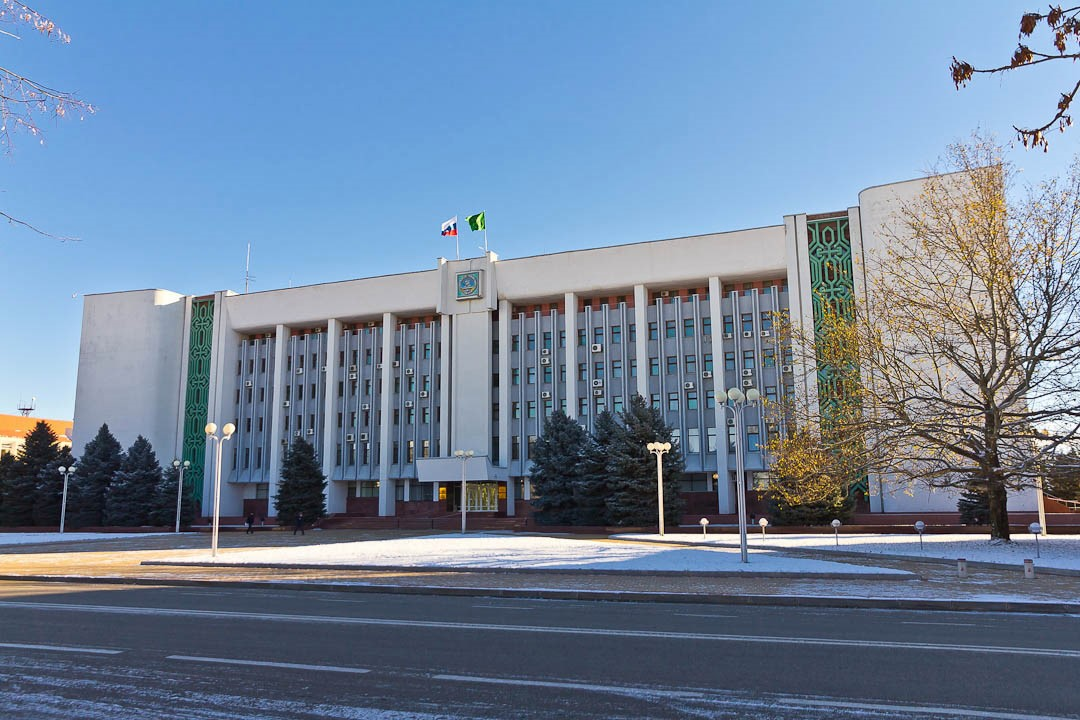
- 22 Zhukovskogo Street, Maykop

Website
- www.gshra.ru

The State Council — Khase of the Republic of Adygea (Russian: Государственный совет — Хасэ Республики Адыгея, romanized: Gosudarstvennyy sovyet — Khase Respubliki Adygeya; Adyghe: Адыгэ Республикэм и Къэралыгъо Совет — Хасэ, romanized: Adəgă Respublikăm i Qăraləġo Sovet — Xasă) is the regional parliament of Adygea, a federal subject of Russia. A total of 50 deputies are elected for five-year terms.

== History ==
Its early predecessor was the Supreme Soviet. In 1993, that was succeeded by the Legislative Assembly.

In 1996, the State Council succeeded the Legislative Assembly.

In 2001–06, it was composed of the Council of Representatives and the Council of the Republic, both of which were elected every five years. There were twenty-seven representatives in each.

In 2006 the State Council became unicameral again.

== Elections ==
=== 2021 ===
Party	%	Seats
United Russia	66.73	40
Communist Party of the Russian Federation	17.65	5
Liberal Democratic Party of Russia	7.74	3
A Just Russia — For Truth	6.14	1
Registered voters/turnout	67.30	

== See also ==
- List of Chairmen of the State Council of the Republic of Adygea
