= Southern constituency (Krasnodar Krai) =

Southern single-member constituency
- Constituency of the Russian State Duma
- Deputy: Konstantin Zatulin; United Russia
- Federal subject: Krasnodar Krai
- Districts: Apsheronsky (Apsheronsk, Chernigovskoye, Mezmay, Neftegorsk, Nizhegorordskaya, Novye Polyany, Otdalyonny), Belorechensky, Sirius, Sochi
- Voters: 538,147 (2026)

The Southern constituency (No.54 (Note: Apsheronsk constituency No.39 in 2003-2007, Sochi constituency No.50 in 2016–2026)) is a Russian legislative constituency in Krasnodar Krai. The constituency covers southern Krasnodar Krai, including the resort city of Sochi as well as towns of Apsheronsk and Belorechensk.

The constituency has been represented since 2016 by United Russia deputy Konstantin Zatulin, a six-term State Duma member and foreign policy expert.

== Boundaries ==
2003–2007 Apsheronsk constituency: Apsheronsky District, Belorechensk, Goryachy Klyuch, Sochi
After 2003 redistricting Krasnodar Krai gained an eight State Duma constituency, which was carved out of Tuapse constituency. This seat covered the resort city of Sochi and stretched northwards to Belorechensk and Goryachy Klyuch.

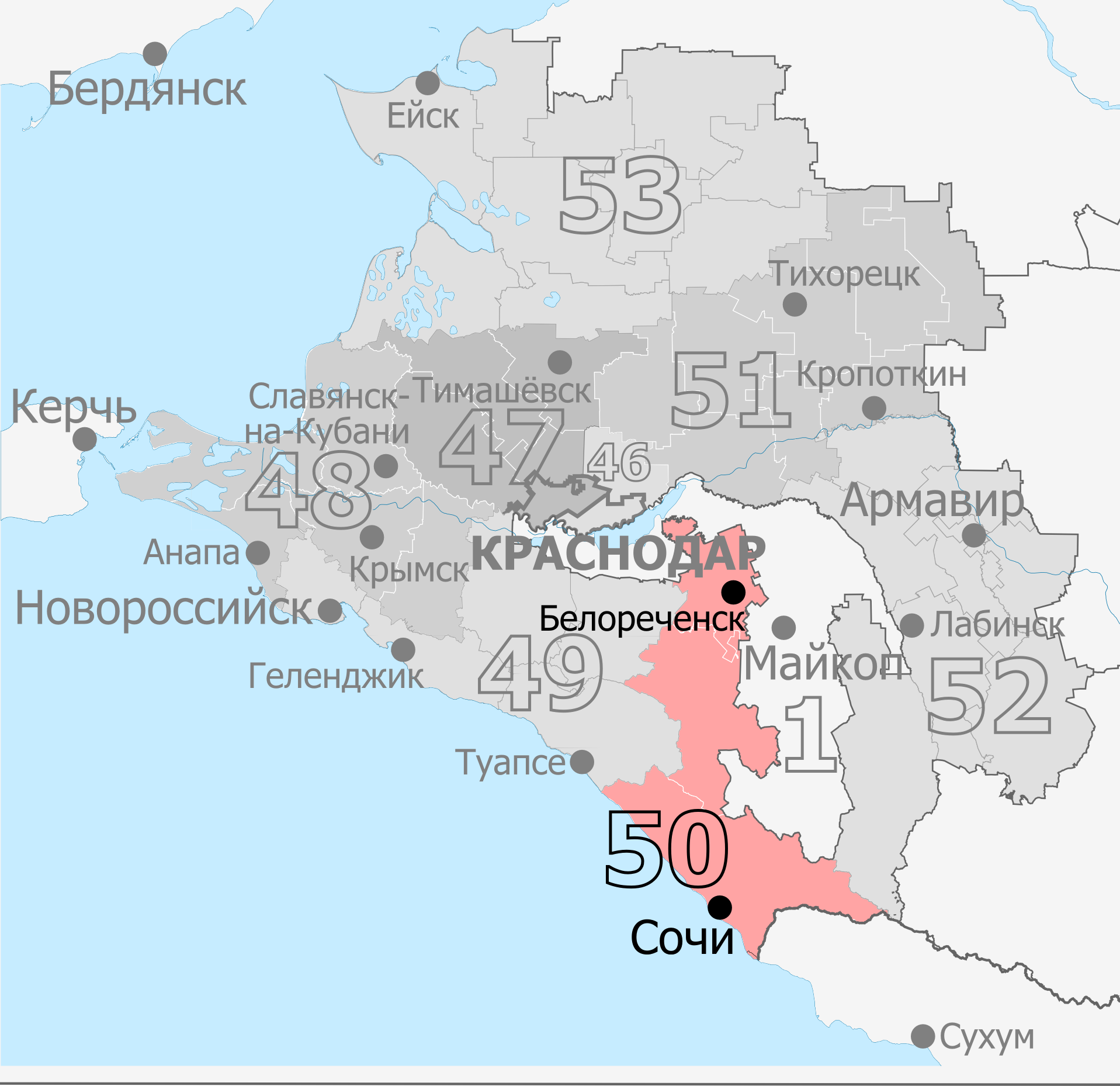
Constituency boundaries from 2016 to 2026

2016–2026 Sochi constituency: Apsheronsky District, Belorechensky District, Sirius, Sochi
The constituency was re-created for the 2016 election under the name of "Sochi constituency". This seat retained almost all of its former territory, losing Goryachy Klyuch to Tuapse constituency.

2026–present: Apsheronsky District (Apsheronsk, Chernigovskoye, Mezmay, Neftegorsk, Nizhegorordskaya, Novye Polyany, Otdalyonny), Belorechensky District, Sirius, Sochi
The constituency was slightly altered after the 2025 redistricting, losing western Apsheronsky District to Tuapse constituency.

== Members elected ==
Election	Member	Party
2003	Vitaly Sevastyanov	Communist Party
2007	Proportional representation - no election by constituency	
2011	Proportional representation - no election by constituency	
2016	Konstantin Zatulin	United Russia
2021	Konstantin Zatulin	United Russia
2026	Konstantin Zatulin	United Russia

== Election results ==
=== 2003 ===
==== Declared candidates ====
- Aleksey Andreyev (PVR-RPZh), former Member of State Duma (1996–1999)
- Yevgeny Bagishvili (LDPR), party activist
- Nikolay Khoroshilov (Independent), Member of Sochi City Assembly, city hospital chief doctor
- Sergey Kozaderov (APR), farmer
- Nikolay Petrov (ORP Rus'), former Chief of Staff – First Deputy Commander of the 51st Army (1992–1995), retired Russian Army major general
- Vitaly Polessky (Independent), businessman
- Vitaly Sevastyanov (CPRF), incumbent Member of State Duma (1994–present) (Note: redistricted from Tuapse constituency), Chairman of the Duma Credential Committee (1994–present)
- Leonid Teleleyko (Yabloko), former Member of Legislative Assembly of Krasnodar Krai (1998–2002)
- Vasily Teterin (United Russia), Member of State Duma (2000–present)

==== Withdrawn candidates ====
- Natalia Serdyukova (Independent), nonprofit chairwoman

==== Did not file ====
- Vyacheslav Kukharkin (ZRS), municipal afterschool centre director
- Martiros Oganesyan (Independent), former kraal diagnostic centre deputy chief doctor, 2000 gubernatorial candidate
- Maksim Panaetov (NPS RF), insurance executive
- Dmitry Zonin (VR–ES), businessman

==== Results ====
Summary of the 7 December 2003 Russian legislative election in the Apsheronsk constituency
Candidate	Party	Votes	%
Vitaly Sevastyanov (incumbent)	Communist Party	41,959	18.71%
Nikolay Khoroshilov	Independent	35,445	15.80%
Vasily Teterin	United Russia	32,534	14.51%
Aleksey Andreyev	Party of Russia's Rebirth-Russian Party of Life	22,845	10.19%
Leonid Teleleyko	Yabloko	18,184	8.11%
Yevgeny Bagishvili	Liberal Democratic Party	8,343	3.72%
Sergey Kozaderov	Agrarian Party	5,542	2.47%
Vitaly Polessky	Independent	3,679	1.64%
Nikolay Petrov	United Russian Party Rus'	3,502	1.56%
against all		41,314	18.42%
Total		224,492	100%

=== 2016 ===
==== Declared candidates ====
- Sergey Badyuk (Rodina), actor, community activist
- Anton Khasanov (CPCR), legal counsel, perennial candidate
- Svetlana Nezhelskaya (Patriots of Russia), landscaping businesswoman
- Dmitry Novikov (The Greens), retired Judge of the Sochi Khostinsky City District Court (2000–2008)
- Tatyana Seredenko (LDPR), Member of Sochi City Assembly (2015–present), oil businesswoman
- Igor Torosyan (A Just Russia), former Member of Legislative Assembly of Krasnodar Krai (2007–2012), marine logistics businessman
- Igor Vasilyev (CPRF), businessman
- Taras Yarosh (Party of Growth), chamber of commerce executive
- Konstantin Zatulin (United Russia), former Member of State Duma (1994–1995, 2003–2011)

==== Withdrawn candidates ====
- Aleksandr Kuznetsov (Yabloko), individual entrepreneur

==== Failed to qualify ====
- Natalya Belan (Independent), pensioner
- Yulia Tretyak (Independent), surveying engineer

==== Results ====
Summary of the 18 September 2016 Russian legislative election in the Sochi constituency
Candidate	Party	Votes	%
Konstantin Zatulin	United Russia	138,232	61.89%
Igor Vasilyev	Communist Party	27,242	12.20%
Tatyana Seredenko	Liberal Democratic Party	15,648	7.01%
Sergey Badyuk	Rodina	8,875	3.97%
Dmitry Novikov	The Greens	8,014	3.59%
Igor Torosyan	A Just Russia	7,551	3.38%
Svetlana Nezhelskaya	Patriots of Russia	4,495	2.01%
Taras Yarosh	Party of Growth	4,137	1.85%
Anton Khasanov	Communists of Russia	3,426	1.53%
Total		223,256	100%

=== 2021 ===
==== Declared candidates ====
- Samvel Bagiryan (Rodina), former businessman
- Aleksandra Bakina (LDPR), Member of Legislative Assembly of Krasnodar Krai (2019–present), oil executive
- Yevgeny Barinov (GP), businessman
- Nikolay Borovkov (CPRF), Member of Belorechensky District Council (2005–present), aide to Legislative Assembly of Krasnodar Krai member
- Murat Dudarev (New People), businessman, community activist
- Yelena Fisenko (Yabloko), mathematics and computer studies teacher
- Vitaly Lukyanov (SR–ZP), former Member of Goryachy Klyuch Council (2005–2010), industrial executive
- Sergey Minin (CPCR), perennial candidate
- Anna Slavgorodskaya (Party of Growth), tourism businesswoman
- Konstantin Zatulin (United Russia), incumbent Member of State Duma (1994–1995, 2003–2011, 2016–present)
- Daniil Zhakin (RPPSS), community activist

==== Failed to qualify ====
- Aleksandr Burlutsky (Independent), tanker fleet navigator

==== Did not file ====
- Karlen Tikhonov (Independent), undergraduate student
- Yulia Tretyak (Independent), unemployed, 2016 candidate for this seat

==== Declined ====
- Vitaly Ignatenko (United Russia), former Senator from Krasnodar Krai (2012–2015), former Deputy Prime Minister of Russia (1995–1997) (lost the primary)

==== Results ====
Summary of the 17-19 September 2021 Russian legislative election in the Sochi constituency
Candidate	Party	Votes	%
Konstantin Zatulin (incumbent)	United Russia	209,512	61.75%
Nikolay Borovkov	Communist Party	42,572	12.55%
Murat Dudarev	New People	16,657	4.91%
Aleksandra Bakina	Liberal Democratic Party	11,851	3.49%
Vitaly Lukyanov	A Just Russia — For Truth	11,098	3.27%
Sergey Minin	Communists of Russia	8,958	2.64%
Yelena Fisenko	Yabloko	7,913	2.33%
Daniil Zhakin	Party of Pensioners	7,105	2.09%
Samvel Bagiryan	Rodina	6,870	2.02%
Yevgeny Barinov	Civic Platform	5,668	1.67%
Anna Slavgorodskaya	Party of Growth	5,207	1.53%
Total		339,309	100%

=== 2026 ===
==== Declared candidates ====
- Dmitry Kozlov (New People), Russian Army officer
- Kirill Matusevich (LDPR), Member of Sochi City Assembly (2025–present), businessman
- Yury Nemtsev (A Just Russia), Member of Sochi City Assembly (2015–present), businessman
- Andrey Titov (The Greens), Member of Upornaya Council (2024–present), insolvency manager
- Konstantin Zatulin (United Russia), incumbent Member of State Duma (1994–1995, 2003–2011, 2016–present)
- Vladislav Zhironkin (CPRF), Member of Sochi City Assembly (2023–present), sales representative

==== Withdrawn candidates ====
- Vladimir Atamanchuk (Yabloko), community activist (disqualified on September 11, 2026, for using extremist materials in campaigning)

==== Did not file ====
- Svetlana Grebneva (Independent), businesswoman, United Russia primary candidate

==== Results ====
Summary of the 18-20 September 2026 Russian legislative election in the Southern constituency
Candidate	Party	Votes	%
Konstantin Zatulin (incumbent)	United Russia	161,879	47.09%
Vladislav Zhironkin	Communist Party	67,841	19.73%
Kirill Matusevich	Liberal Democratic Party	46,826	13.62%
Yury Nemtsev	A Just Russia	31,461	9.15%
Andrey Titov	The Greens	20,964	6.10%
Dmitry Kozlov	New People	12,248	3.56%
Total		343,774	100%
