= Chernomorsky constituency =

Russian legislative constituency

Chernomorsky single-member constituency
- Constituency of the Russian State Duma
- Deputy: Sergey Altukhov; United Russia
- Federal subject: Krasnodar Krai
- Districts: Apsheronsky (Kabardinskaya, Khadyzhensk, Kubanskaya, Kurinskaya, Tverskaya), Gelendzhik, Novorossiysk, Tuapsinsky
- Voters: 463,634 (2026)

The Chernomorsky constituency (No.53 (Note: Tuapse constituency No.45 in 1993-1995, Tuapse constituency No.44 in 1995-2003, Tuapse constituency No.46 in 2003-2007, Tuapse constituency No.49 in 2016–2026)) is a Russian legislative constituency in Krasnodar Krai. The constituency covers most of Krasnodar Krai Black Sea coast, stretching from Novorossiysk to Tuapse, including sea resort Gelendzhik.

The constituency has been represented since 2021 by United Russia deputy Sergey Altukhov, former Deputy Chairman of the Legislative Assembly of Krasnodar Krai and IT executive, who won the open seat, succeeding one-term United Russia incumbent Vladimir Sinyagovsky.

== Boundaries ==
1993–2003 Tuapse constituency: Apsheronsky District, Belorechensk, Belorechensky District, Goryachy Klyuch, Sochi, Tuapse, Tuapsinsky District
The constituency covered southern Krasnodar Krai, including Black Sea resorts of Sochi and Tuapse as well as inland territories near the border with Adygea.

2003–2007 Tuapse constituency: Gelendzhik, Novorossiysk, Seversky District, Tuapse, Tuapsinsky District
After 2003 redistricting the constituency was significantly changed, retaining only Tuapse and Tuapsinsky District, while losing the rest of its former territory to new Apsheronsk constituency. The constituency was pushed northwards, gaining Gelendzhik sea resort and major port of Novorossiysk from the former Novorossiysk constituency, Seversky District from Prikubansky constituency.

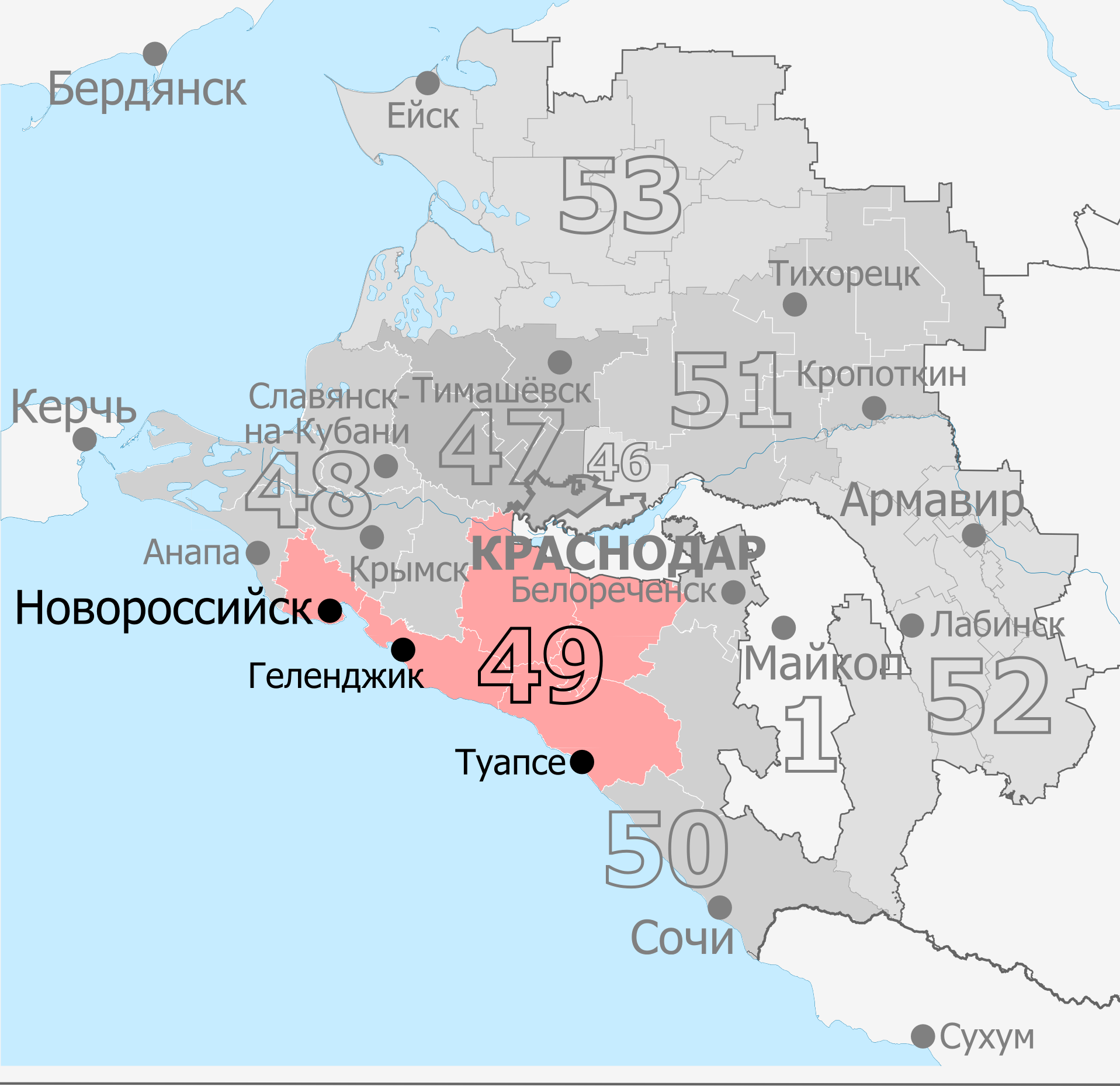
Constituency boundaries from 2016 to 2026

2016–2026 Tuapse constituency: Gelendzhik, Goryachy Klyuch, Novorossiysk, Seversky District, Tuapsinsky District
The constituency was re-created for the 2016 election. This seat retained all of its former territory and gained Goryachy Klyuch from former Apsheronsk constituency.

2026–present: Apsheronsky District (Kabardinskaya, Khadyzhensk, Kubanskaya, Kurinskaya, Tverskaya), Gelendzhik, Novorossiysk, Tuapsinsky District
The constituency was significantly altered after the 2025 redistricting, losing Goryachy Klyuch and Seversky District to new South-Western constituency. This seat gained eastern Apsheronsky District from Sochi constituency and was renamed "Chernomorsky constituency".

== Members elected ==
Election	Member	Party
1993	Vadim Boyko	Independent
1995	Vitaly Sevastyanov	Communist Party
1999	Vitaly Sevastyanov	Communist Party
2003	Sergey Shishkarev	Rodina
2007	Proportional representation - no election by constituency	
2011	Proportional representation - no election by constituency	
2016	Vladimir Sinyagovsky	United Russia
2021	Sergey Altukhov	United Russia
2026	Sergey Altukhov	United Russia

== Election results ==
=== 1993 ===
==== Declared candidates ====
- Vadim Boyko (Independent), journalist (previously ran as DPR candidate)
- Oskian Galustyan (Independent), chief of the MVD Training Centre (1987–present), militsiya major general
- Ashot Idzhyan (Independent), businessman
- Vitaly Sevastyanov (CPRF), former People's Deputy of Russia (1990–1993), cosmonaut, Hero of the Soviet Union (1970, 1975)
- Valery Sudakov (Choice of Russia), businessman
- Aleksandr Udalov (Independent), construction executive
- Konstantin Zatulin (PRES), entrepreneurs' association director

==== Results ====
Summary of the 12 December 1993 Russian legislative election in the Tuapse constituency
Candidate	Party	Votes	%
Vadim Boyko	Independent	72,115	26.19%
Vitaly Sevastyanov	Communist Party	60,899	22.12%
Konstantin Zatulin	Party of Russian Unity and Accord	55,118	20.02%
Aleksandr Udalov	Independent	20,942	7.61%
Oskian Galustyan	Independent	11,014	4.00%
Valery Sudakov	Choice of Russia	8,782	3.19%
Ashot Idzhyan	Independent	8,198	2.98%
against all		21,485	7.80%
Total		275,320	100%

=== 1995 ===
==== Declared candidates ====
- Vadim Boyko (Forward, Russia!), incumbent Member of State Duma (1994–present)
- Vladimir Gritsan (Independent), Member of State Duma (1994–present)
- Andrey Kaspinsky (Independent), nonprofit vice president
- Sergey Kovalev (LDPR), taekwondo federation president
- Vladimir Serebrennikov (Independent), Deputy Military Commissioner of Sochi Adlersky City District
- Vitaly Sevastyanov (CPRF), Member of State Duma (1994–present), Chairman of the Credentials Commission (1994–present), 1993 candidate for this seat
- Eduard Sharifov (ROD), banker
- Aleksandr Shcherbakov (PPR–ST), forestry union leader
- Sergey Shelest (KhDS–KhR), businessman
- Yevgeny Shulik (APR), Deputy Mayor of Sochi
- Leonid Teleleyko (Yabloko), teaching methodologist
- Aleksandr Vorobyev (BIR), nonprofit director
- Dmitry Yakushev (Independent), bank director
- Konstantin Zatulin (KRO), Member of State Duma (1994–present), Chairman of the Duma Committee on Commonwealth of Independent States Affairs and Relations with Compatriots (1994–present), 1993 PRES candidate for this seat

==== Results ====
Summary of the 17 December 1995 Russian legislative election in the Tuapse constituency
Candidate	Party	Votes	%
Vitaly Sevastyanov	Communist Party	90,609	27.61%
Konstantin Zatulin	Congress of Russian Communities	64,578	19.67%
Vadim Boyko (incumbent)	Forward, Russia!	54,086	16.48%
Leonid Teleleyko	Yabloko	20,728	6.32%
Sergey Kovalev	Liberal Democratic Party	17,049	5.19%
Aleksandr Shcherbakov	Trade Unions and Industrialists – Union of Labour	10,234	3.12%
Yevgeny Shulik	Agrarian Party	7,213	2.20%
Andrey Kaspinsky	Independent	7,151	2.18%
Dmitry Yakushev	Independent	6,127	1.87%
Vladimir Gritsan	Independent	5,168	1.57%
Vladimir Serebrennikov	Independent	4,665	1.42%
Eduard Sharifov	Russian All-People's Movement	4,202	1.28%
Sergey Shelest	Christian-Democratic Union - Christians of Russia	3,540	1.08%
Aleksandr Vorobyev	Ivan Rybkin Bloc	3,507	1.07%
against all		24,020	7.32%
Total		328,224	100%

=== 1999 ===
==== Declared candidates ====
- Larisa Kanashkina (Independent), journalist
- Aleksandr Kravtsov (RSP), pharmaceutical representative
- Viktor Krokhmal (Independent), former Member of Legislative Assembly of Krasnodar Krai (1994–1998), agricultural executive, 1996 gubernatorial candidate
- Darya Mitina (Independent), Member of State Duma (1996–present)
- Gennady Pristav (Independent), militsiya investigator
- Vitaly Sevastyanov (CPRF), incumbent Member of State Duma (1994–present), Chairman of the Credentials Commission (1994–present)
- Leonid Teleleyko (Independent), Member of Legislative Assembly of Krasnodar Krai (1998–present), 1995 candidate for this seat
- Igor Usachev (Independent), municipal master plan institute director
- Konstantin Zakharchenko (MTM), construction executive
- Konstantin Zatulin (OVR), former Member of State Duma (1994–1995), 1993 PRES and 1995 KRO candidate for this seat

==== Withdrawn candidates ====
- Aram Takhmazyan (Independent)

==== Failed to qualify ====
- Anatoly Kostriko (LDPR)
- Aleksandr Krut (KRO-Boldyrev), businessman

==== Did not file ====
- Georgy Borovikov (DN), former People's Deputy of the Soviet Union (1989–1991)
- Vladimir Gladkikh (Independent)
- Viktor Stepanenko (Independent)

==== Results ====
Summary of the 19 December 1999 Russian legislative election in the Tuapse constituency
Candidate	Party	Votes	%
Vitaly Sevastyanov (incumbent)	Communist Party	93,036	30.43%
Viktor Krokhmal	Independent	69,098	22.60%
Konstantin Zatulin	Fatherland – All Russia	37,198	12.17%
Konstantin Zakharchenko	Peace, Labour, May	20,361	6.66%
Leonid Teleleyko	Independent	16,008	5.24%
Aleksandr Kravtsov	Russian Socialist Party	15,344	5.02%
Larisa Kanashkina	Independent	6,776	2.22%
Gennady Pristav	Independent	4,678	1.53%
Darya Mitina	Independent	4,423	1.45%
Igor Usachev	Independent	2,395	0.78%
against all		30,338	9.92%
Total		305,719	100%

=== 2003 ===
==== Declared candidates ====
- Aleksandr Belichenko (LDPR), businessman
- Pavel Beloglazov (Independent), history lecturer
- Dmitry Gerasimov (ORP Rus'), recreation centre director
- Ilya Kochyan (United Russia), Novocherkassk Electric Locomotive Plant deputy director general
- Mikhail Kovalyuk (Independent), Member of Legislative Assembly of Krasnodar Krai (2002–present), oil businessman
- Semyon Kuznetsov (PVR-RPZh), businessman
- Sergey Panchenko (Yabloko), non-ferrous metals plant executive director
- Vladimir Savchenko (Independent), attorney
- Lyudmila Sergeyeva (Independent), television station director
- Konstantin Shirshov (CPRF), Krasnodar Administration official
- Sergey Shishkarev (Rodina), incumbent Member of State Duma (2000–present) (Note: redistricted from Novorossiysk constituency)
- Anatoly Vysochin (Independent), First Deputy Mayor of Tuapse (1997–present)
- Sergey Yaryshev (Independent), Member of Legislative Assembly of Krasnodar Krai (2002–present), marine transportation executive
- Nina Zatsepina (Independent), former Member of State Duma (1994–1999)

==== Withdrawn candidates ====
- Sergey Kovalev (Independent), taekwondo federation president, 1995 candidate for this seat

==== Failed to qualify ====
- Zoya Bagrova (Independent), former Member of Legislative Assembly of Krasnodar Krai (1998–2002), Novorossiysk city polyclinic chief doctor
- Yevgeny Panov (PME), nursing home deputy director
- Sergey Saneyev (DPR), engineer

==== Did not file ====
- Aleksandr Cherednichenko (NPS RF), businessman
- Galina Molchanova (Independent), municipal administrator
- Marina Novozhilova (Independent), homemaker
- Pyotr Shirshov (Independent), maintenance locksmith
- Sergey Vasilyev (Independent), unemployed
- Viktor Yerokhin (ZRS), marine resources state inspector

==== Declined ====
- Vitaly Sevastyanov (CPRF), incumbent Member of State Duma (1994–present), Chairman of the Credentials Commission (1994–present) (redistricted to Apsheronsk constituency)

==== Results ====
Summary of the 7 December 2003 Russian legislative election in the Tuapse constituency
Candidate	Party	Votes	%
Sergey Shishkarev (incumbent)	Rodina	41,419	18.98%
Sergey Yaryshev	Independent	30,132	13.82%
Ilya Kochyan	United Russia	23,668	10.85%
Nina Zatsepina	Independent	20,054	9.19%
Konstantin Shirshov	Communist Party	17,421	7.98%
Mikhail Kovalyuk	Independent	17,048	7.81%
Anatoly Vysochin	Independent	10,735	4.92%
Aleksandr Belichenko	Liberal Democratic Party	7,173	3.29%
Sergey Panchenko	Yabloko	5,751	2.64%
Pavel Beloglazov	Independent	4,416	2.02%
Vladimir Savchenko	Independent	2,687	1.23%
Semyon Kuznetsov	Party of Russia's Rebirth-Russian Party of Life	2,087	0.96%
Lyudmila Sergeyeva	Independent	1,896	0.87%
Dmitry Gerasimov	United Russian Party Rus'	752	0.34%
against all		28,696	13.15%
Total		218,419	100%

=== 2016 ===
==== Declared candidates ====
- Valery Khot (LDPR), corporate executive
- Vladimir Shturkin (Rodina), dance instructor
- Vladimir Sinyagovsky (United Russia), Mayor of Novorossiysk (2002–present)
- Aleksey Trenin (CPRF), Member of State Duma (2015–present)
- Yevgeny Vitishko (Yabloko), ecological activist
- Mikhail Yerokhin (A Just Russia), Member of Novorossiysk City Duma (2015–present), publishing businessman
- Olga Zaruba (CPCR), perennial candidate

==== Withdrawn candidates ====
- Aram Ayrapetyan (GS), unemployed
- Oleg Prokopenko (Party of Growth), businessman

==== Results ====
Summary of the 18 September 2016 Russian legislative election in the Tuapse constituency
Candidate	Party	Votes	%
Vladimir Sinyagovsky	United Russia	237,852	70.52%
Aleksey Trenin	Communist Party	28,206	8.36%
Valery Khot	Liberal Democratic Party	21,794	6.46%
Mikhail Yerokhin	A Just Russia	15,891	4.71%
Olga Zaruba	Communists of Russia	14,006	4.15%
Vladimir Shturkin	Rodina	7,224	2.14%
Yevgeny Vitishko	Yabloko	7,195	2.13%
Total		337,287	100%

=== 2021 ===
==== Declared candidates ====
- Sergey Altukhov (United Russia), Deputy Chairman of the Legislative Assembly of Krasnodar Krai (2017–present)
- Viktor Ivanov (LDPR), Member of Tuapsinsky District Council (2018–present), gas distribution executive
- Yevgeny Kapustin (New People), businessman
- Sergey Koltunov (RPPSS), pensioner
- Yulia Kovaleva (The Greens), housing cooperative chairwoman
- Eduard Kunayev (Yabloko), businessman
- Pavel Naumenko (Party of Growth), construction executive
- Sergey Plekhanov (Rodina), Member of Afipsky Council (2019–present)
- Vitaly Pronkin (CPRF), Member of Merchanskoye Council (2019–present), party secretary
- Sergey Sazonov (SR–ZP), Member of Novorossiysk City Duma (2020–present), construction executive
- Tatyana Sibiryakova (RPSS), counselor at Orlyonok
- Albert Yenikeyev (GP), medical executive

==== Declined ====
- Vladimir Sinyagovsky (United Russia), incumbent Member of State Duma (2016–present)

==== Results ====
Summary of the 17-19 September 2021 Russian legislative election in the Tuapse constituency
Candidate	Party	Votes	%
Sergey Altukhov	United Russia	243,149	64.30%
Vitaly Pronkin	Communist Party	42,708	11.29%
Sergey Sazonov	A Just Russia — For Truth	19,876	5.26%
Yevgeny Kapustin	New People	15,054	3.98%
Viktor Ivanov	Liberal Democratic Party	11,799	3.12%
Sergey Koltunov	Party of Pensioners	8,786	2.32%
Pavel Naumenko	Party of Growth	8,589	2.27%
Tatyana Sibiryakova	Russian Party of Freedom and Justice	6,356	1.68%
Yulia Kovaleva	The Greens	5,548	1.47%
Sergey Plekhanov	Rodina	3,620	0.96%
Eduard Kunayev	Yabloko	3,070	0.81%
Albert Yenikeyev	Civic Platform	2,835	0.75%
Total		378,154	100%

=== 2026 ===
==== Declared candidates ====
- Sergey Altukhov (United Russia), incumbent Member of State Duma (2021–present)
- Aleksey Karpich (A Just Russia), Member of Novorossiysk City Duma (2015–2018, 2025–present), construction businessman
- Valery Korkhmazov (LDPR), Member of Novorossiysk City Duma (2025–present), city hospital chief doctor
- Vadim Kulkov (New People), Member of Timashevsk Council (2024–present), businessman
- Vitaly Pronkin (CPRF), Member of Novorossiysk City Duma (2025–present), party secretary, 2021 candidate for this seat

==== Results ====
Summary of the 18-20 September 2026 Russian legislative election in the Chernomorsky constituency
Candidate	Party	Votes	%
Sergey Altukhov (incumbent)	United Russia	197,365	60.03%
Vitaly Pronkin	Communist Party	52,354	15.92%
Vadim Kulkov	New People	32,444	9.87%
Valery Korkhmazov	Liberal Democratic Party	29,711	9.04%
Aleksey Karpich	A Just Russia	15,170	4.61%
Total		328,773	100%
