= Apsheronsky =

Apsheronsky (masculine), Apsheronskaya (feminine), or Apsheronskoye (neuter) may refer to:

- Apsheronsky District, a district of Krasnodar Krai, Russia
- Apsheronsky District, Russian name of Absheron District, a district of Azerbaijan
- Apsheronskoye Urban Settlement, a municipal formation which the Town of Apsheronsk in Apsheronsky District of Krasnodar Krai, Russia is incorporated as
- Absheron peninsula (Apsheronsky poluostrov), a peninsula in Azerbaijan
- Apsheronskaya, name of Apsheronsk, a town in Krasnodar Krai, Russia, until 1947
- Apsheronsk narrow-gauge railway (Apsheronskaya railway), a narrow-gauge railway in Krasnodar Krai, Russia
