= Mezmay =

Village in Apsheronsky District, Russia

Coordinates: 44°12′N 39°58′E

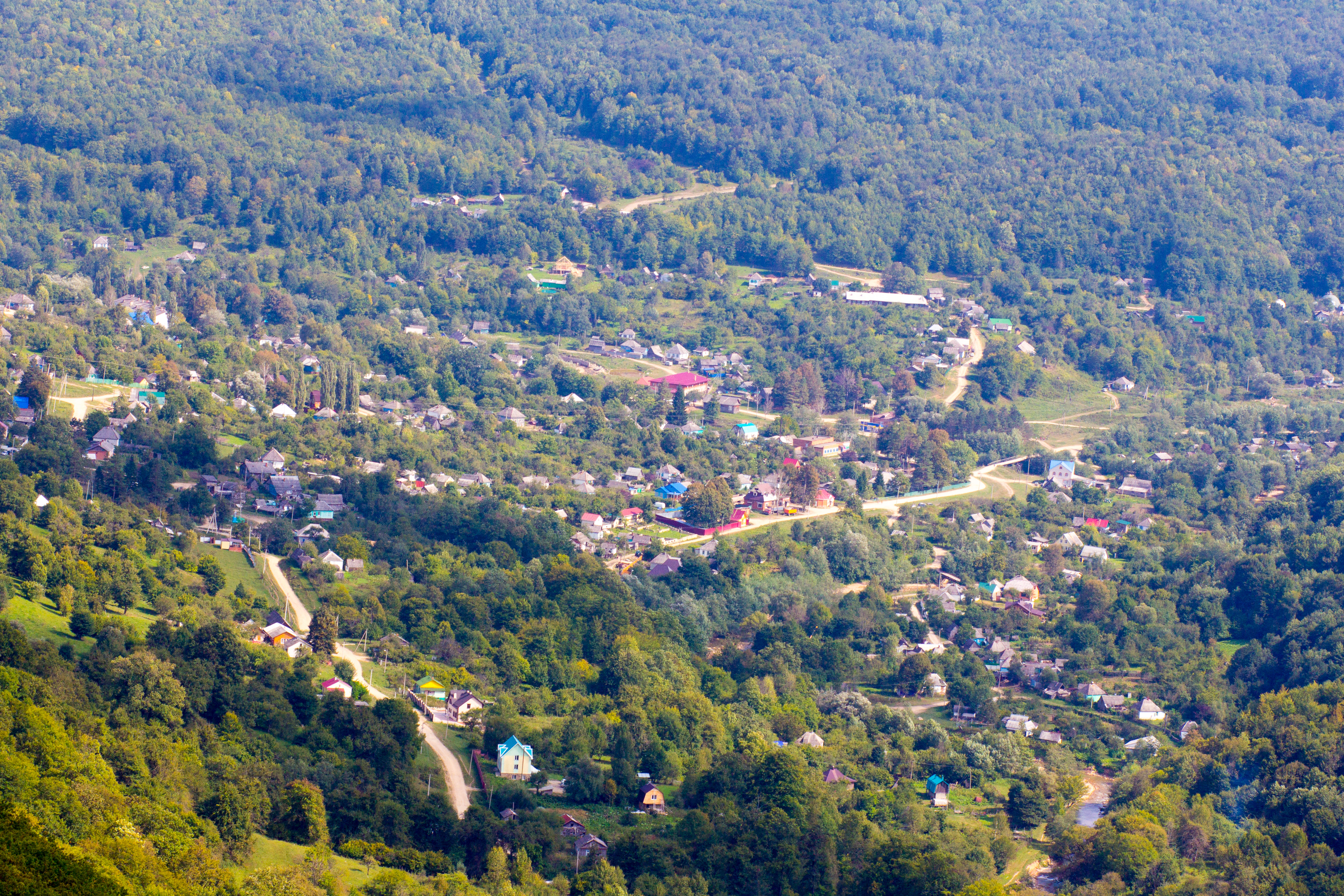
View of Mezmay

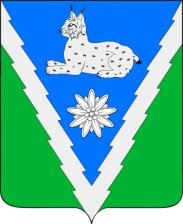
Coat of arms of Mezmai

Mezmay (Adyghe: Мэзмые, Russian: Мезма́й) is a settlement in Apsheronsky District of Krasnodar Krai, Russia, located in the valley of the Kurdzhips River near its confluence with the Mezmay River, 35 kilometres (22 mi) south-east of Apsheronsk. Its population is less than a thousand inhabitants. It is a popular mountain resort.

The village was linked with Apsheronsk by branch line of the Apsheronsk narrow-gauge railway, yet, in 2010 this branch was almost completely dismantled, except 8 kilometres (5.0 mi) length part between Mezmay and village Guamka. This remaining railway was from 2011 to 2017 interrupted due to a landslide.

== Name ==
The name Mezmay is formed of the two Circassian words Mez (forest) and Mye (wild apple), so Mezmay translated from Circassian as "wild apples forest."

== Landmarks ==
Mezmay is a popular tourist site with a lot of natural attractions: (waterfalls, caves, canyons, etc.), the Clay Roman necropolis (Mezmayskoe burial) on the north-western outskirts of the village and the astrophysics observatory of the Kuban State University.

There is also Mezmaiskaya cave, where, in 1993, was found perfectly preserved skeleton of a Neanderthal baby from which DNA was extracted.

== Gallery ==
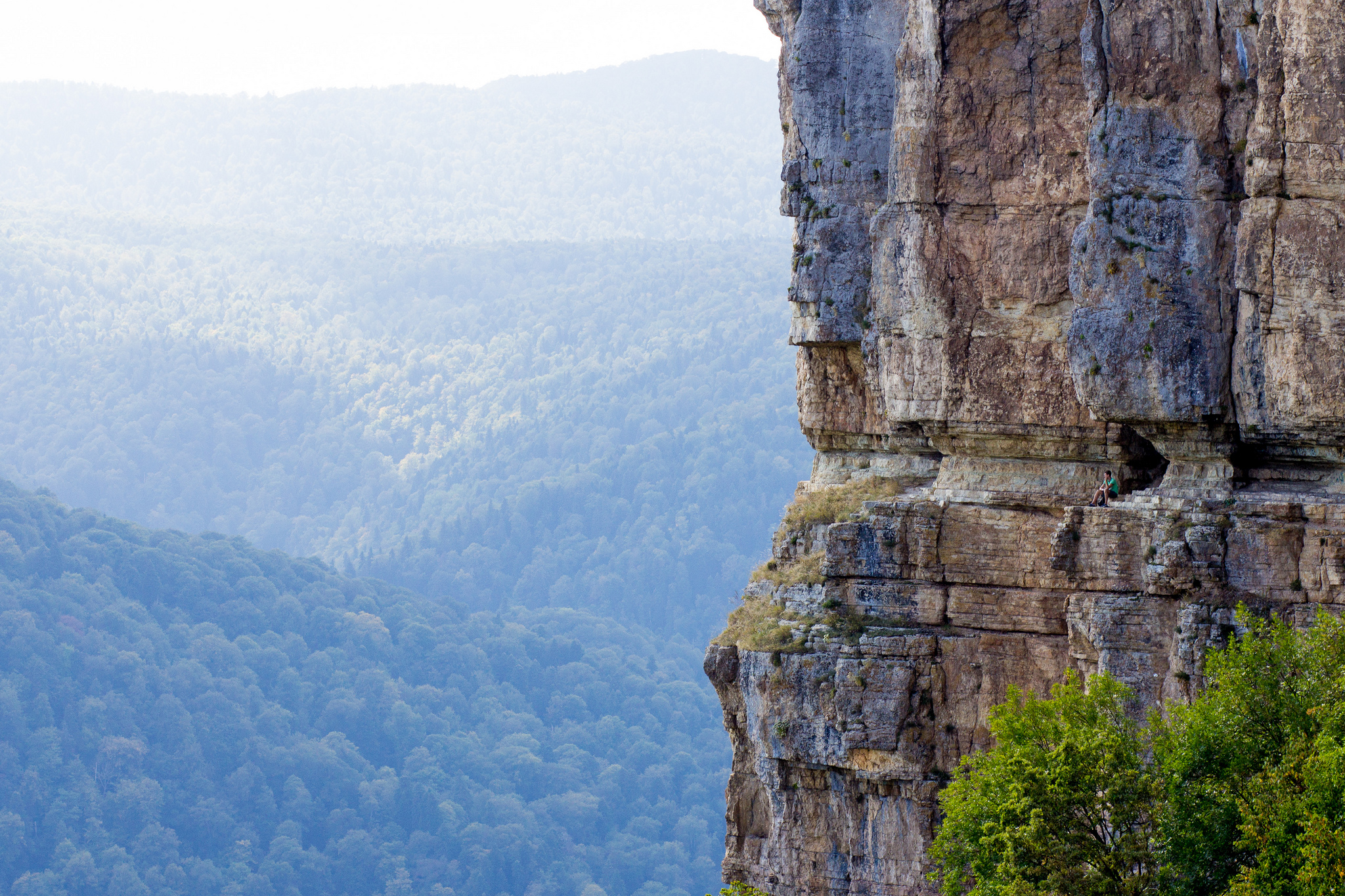
Cliffs of Guam Ridge in the surroundings of Mezmay

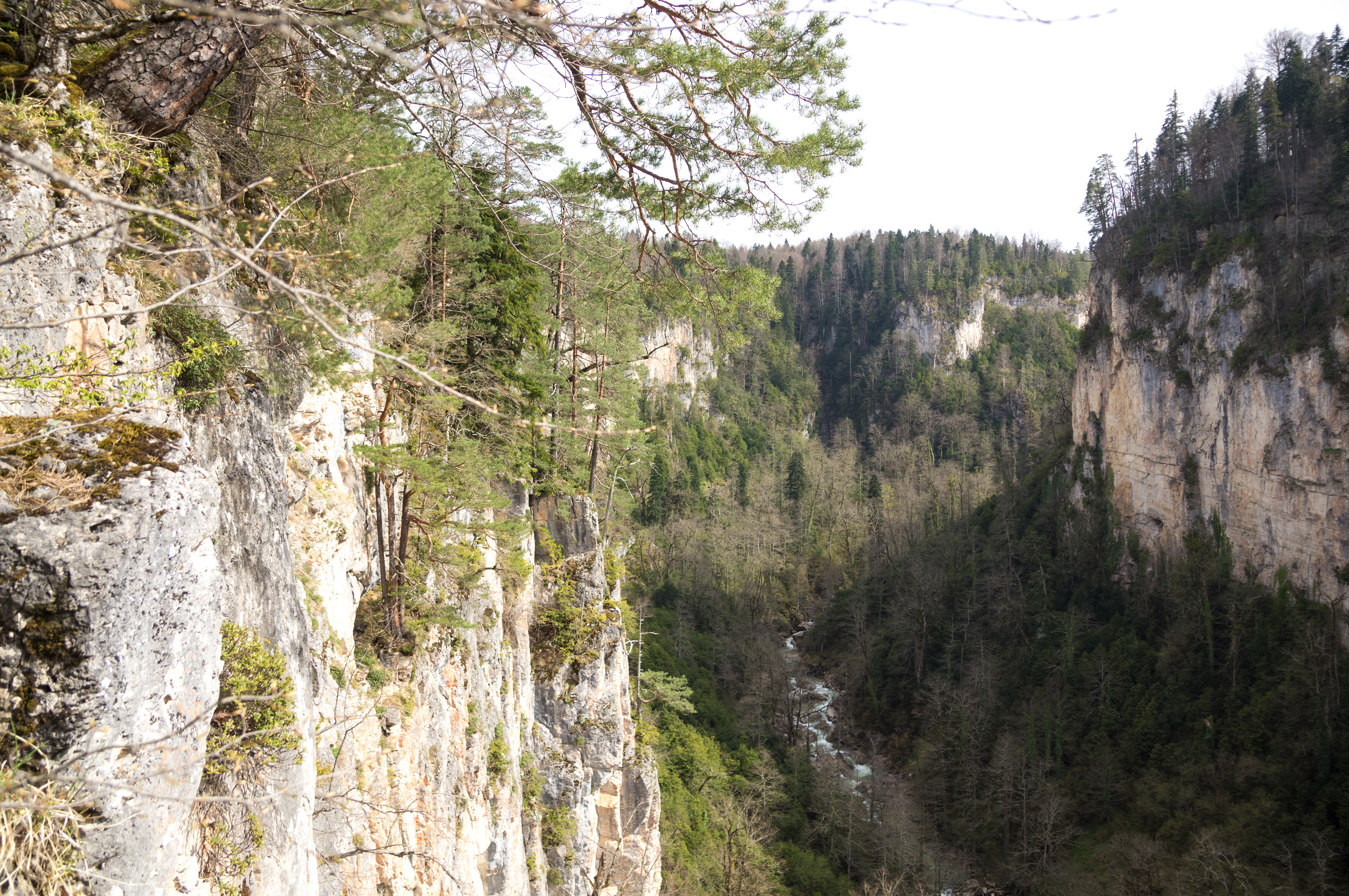
Kurdzhips River Canyon near Mezmay

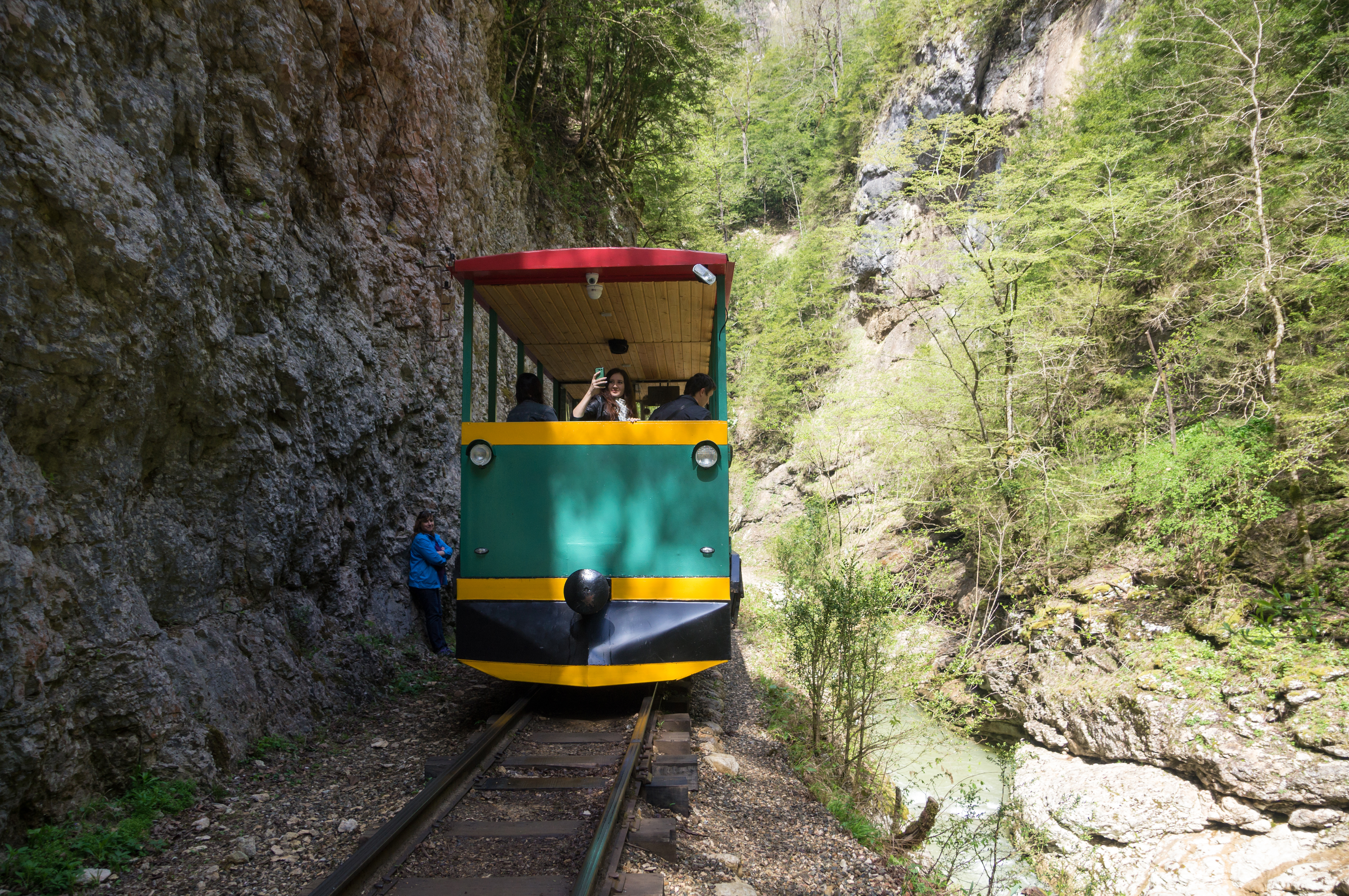
Apsheronsk mountain railway near Mezmay

Mezmai surroundings
