= Neftegorsk =

Neftegorsk may refer to:

- Neftegorsk, Krasnodar Krai, an urban-type settlement in Krasnodar Krai, Russia
- Neftegorsk, Sakhalin Oblast, a former urban-type settlement in Sakhalin Oblast, Russia, destroyed in an earthquake in 1995
- Neftegorsk, Samara Oblast, a town in Samara Oblast, Russia
