= Sakhray =

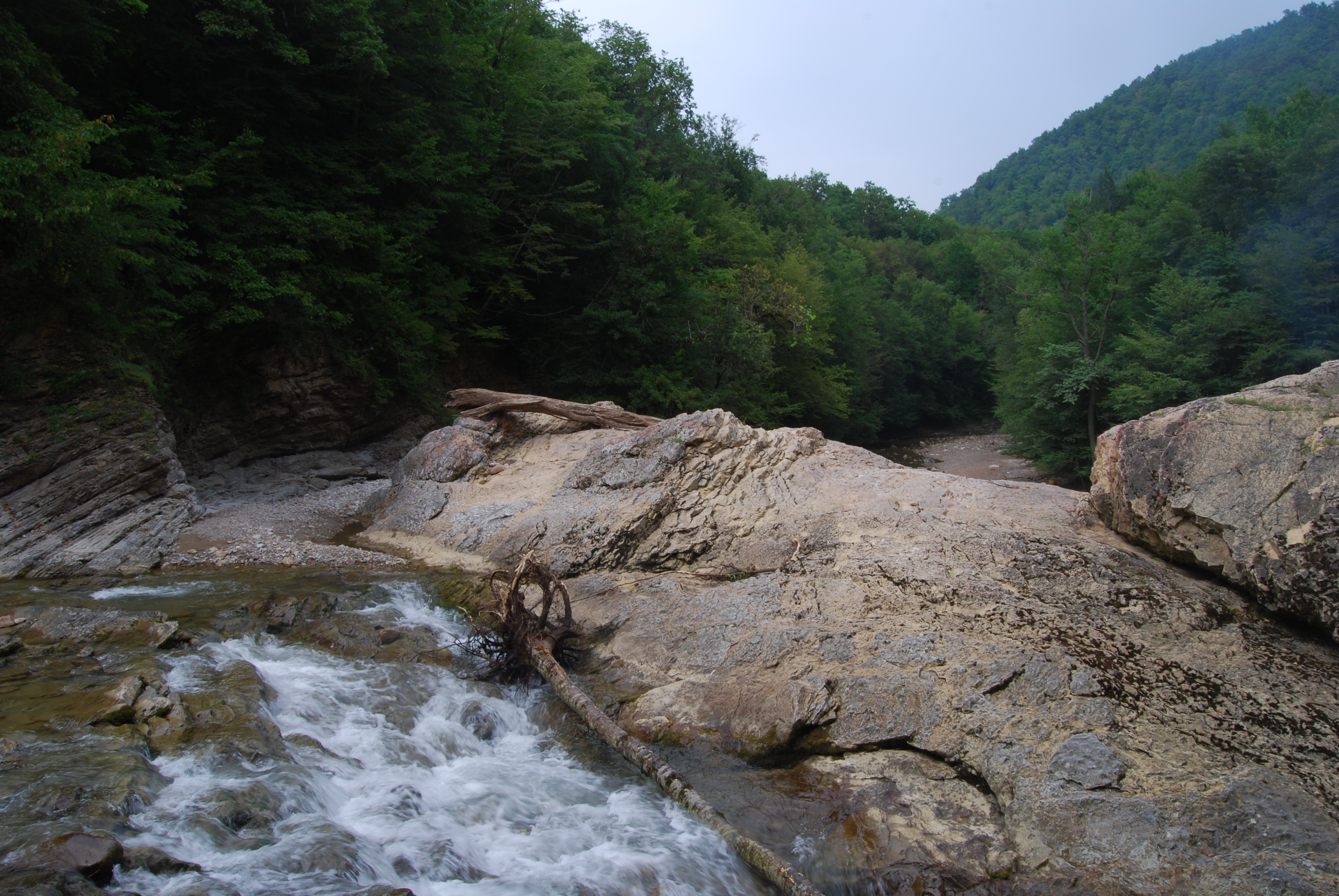
- Sakhray River Canyon

- Location within Republic of Adygea Location within Caucasus Mountains Location within European Russia

Physical characteristics
- Mouth: Dakh
  - coordinates: 44.2035°N 40.2664°E
- Length: 31 km (19 mi)
- Basin size: 259 km^{2} (100 sq mi)

Basin features
- Progression: Dakh→ Belaya→ Kuban→ Sea of Azov

The Sakhray (Russian: Сахрай) is a river of southwest Russia. It flows through the Republic of Adygea. It is a left tributary of the Dakh. It is 31 kilometres (19 mi) long, and has a drainage basin of 259 square kilometres (100 sq mi).
