= Grushevy =

Grushevy (Russian: Грушевый; masculine), Grushevaya (Грушевая; feminine), or Grushevoye (Грушевое; neuter) is the name of several rural localities in Russia:

- Grushevy, Krasnodar Krai, a khutor in Rodnikovsky Rural Okrug of Belorechensky District in Krasnodar Krai; 44°46′N 39°59′E
- Grushevy, Stavropol Krai, a khutor under the administrative jurisdiction of the city of krai significance of Stavropol in Stavropol Krai
- Grushevoye, Republic of Crimea, a selo in Simferopolsky District of Republic of Crimea
- Grushevoye, Primorsky Krai, a selo under the administrative jurisdiction of Dalnerechensk Town Under Krai Jurisdiction in Primorsky Krai
