= Dakh =

River of southwest Russia

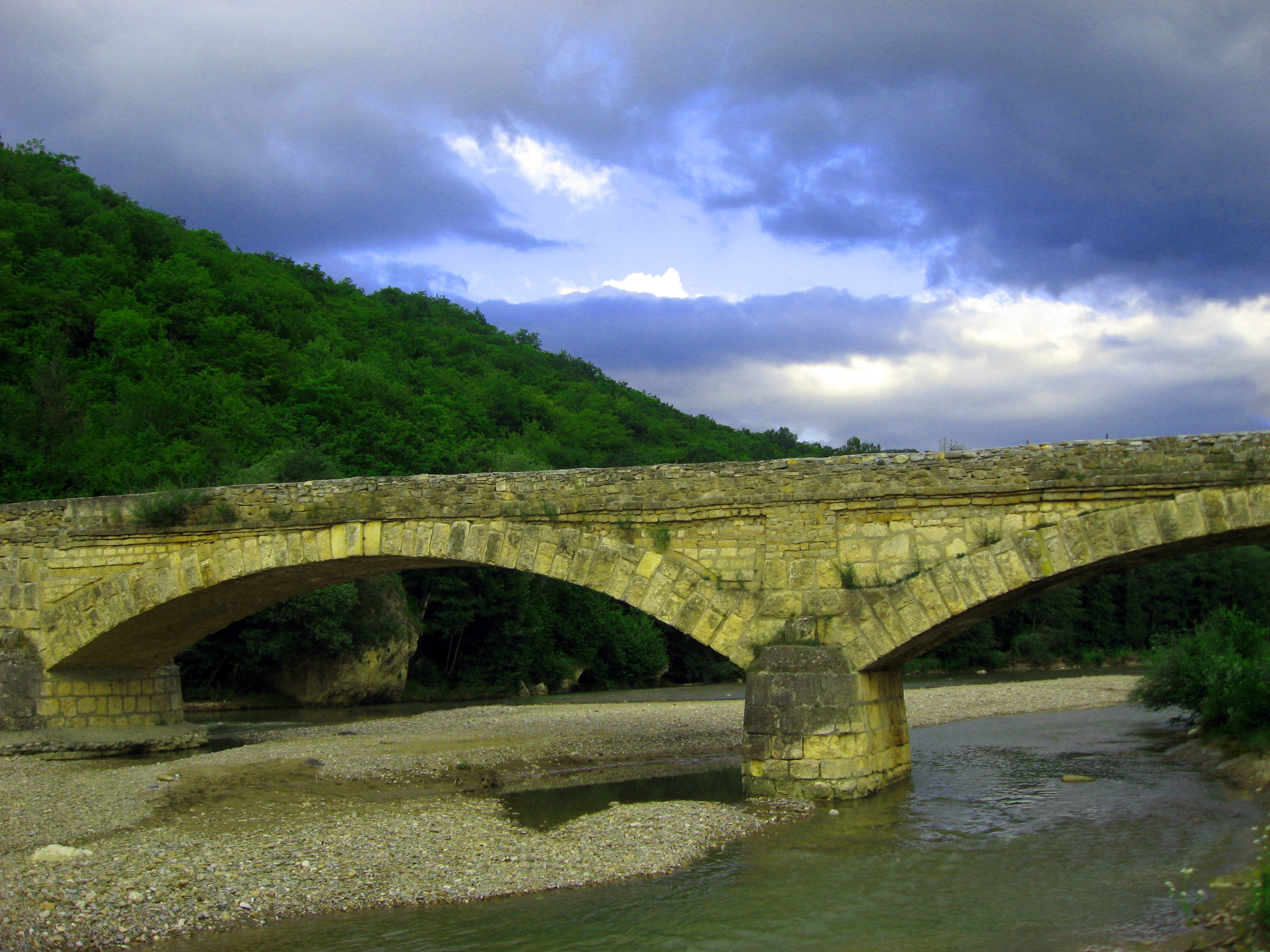
- Old bridge

- Location within Republic of Adygea Location within Caucasus Mountains Location within European Russia
- Native name: Дах (Russian)

Location
- Country: Russia
- Federal District: Southern

Physical characteristics
- Source
  - coordinates: 44.18040°N 40.40388°E
- Mouth: Belaya
  - location: near Dakhovskaya
  - coordinates: 44.24128°N 40.19960°E
- Length: 23 km (14 mi)
- Basin size: 389 km^{2} (150 mi^{2})

Basin features
- Progression: Belaya→ Kuban→ Sea of Azov

The Dakh is a river of southwest Russia. It flows through the Republic of Adygea. It is a right tributary of the Belaya. The Sakhray is its left tributary. It is 23 kilometres (14 mi) long, and has a drainage basin of 389 square kilometres (150 sq mi).
