= Khadyzhensk =

Town in Krasnodar Krai, Russia

Khadyzhensk Хадыженск
- Town
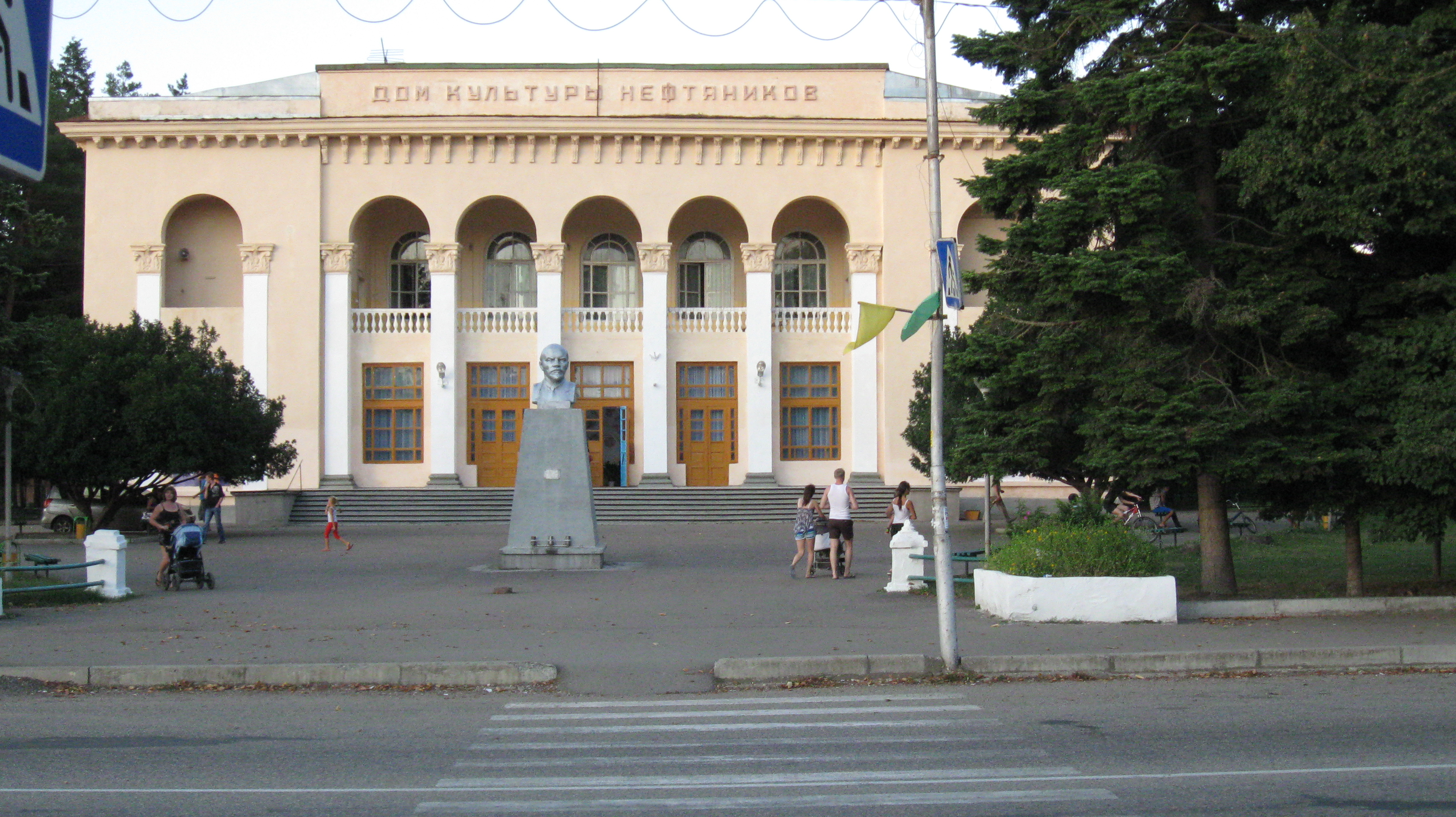
- Culture House in Khadyzhensk

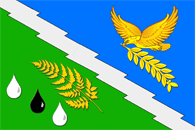
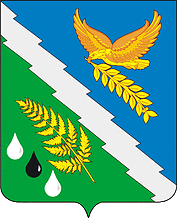
- Flag Coat of arms
- Interactive map of Khadyzhensk
- Location of Khadyzhensk Khadyzhensk (European Russia) Khadyzhensk (Russia)
- Coordinates: 44°25′32″N 39°31′55″E
- Country: Russia
- Federal subject: Krasnodar Krai
- Administrative district: Apsheronsky District
- TownSelsoviet: Khadyzhensk
- Founded: 1864
- Town status since: 1949
- Elevation: 120 m (390 ft)

Population (2010 Census)
  - Total: 21,579
  - Estimate (2025): 21,700 (+0.6%)

Administrative status
  - Capital of: Town of Khadyzhensk

Municipal status
  - Municipal district: Apsheronsky Municipal District
  - Urban settlement: Khadyzhenskoye Urban Settlement
  - Capital of: Khadyzhenskoye Urban Settlement
- Time zone: UTC+3 (MSK)
- Postal code: 352680–352681
- OKTMO ID: 03605109001
- Website: had.apsheronsk-oms.ru

Khadyzhensk (Russian: Хады́женск) is a town in Apsheronsky District of Krasnodar Krai, Russia, located on the Pshish River, 113 kilometers (70 mi) southeast of Krasnodar.

== History ==
It was founded in 1864 as the stanitsa of Khadyzhenskaya (Хадыженская). According to the 1926 census, the population was 48.1% Russian and 41.6% Ukrainian. Town status was granted in 1949.

== Administrative and municipal status ==
Within the framework of administrative divisions, it is, together with three rural localities, incorporated within Apsheronsky District as the Town of Khadyzhensk. As a municipal division, the Town of Khadyzhensk is incorporated within Apsheronsky Municipal District as Khadyzhenskoye Urban Settlement.

== Demographics ==
Historical population
Year	Pop.	±%
1926	2,468	—
1989	18,998	+669.8%
2002	21,286	+12.0%
2010	21,579	+1.4%
2018	22,468	+4.1%
Source: 21,579 (2010 census); 21,286 (2002 census); 18,998 (1989 Soviet census). 2,468 (1926 Soviet census)
