= Sergey Altukhov =

Russian politician (born 1982)

- Сергей Алтухов
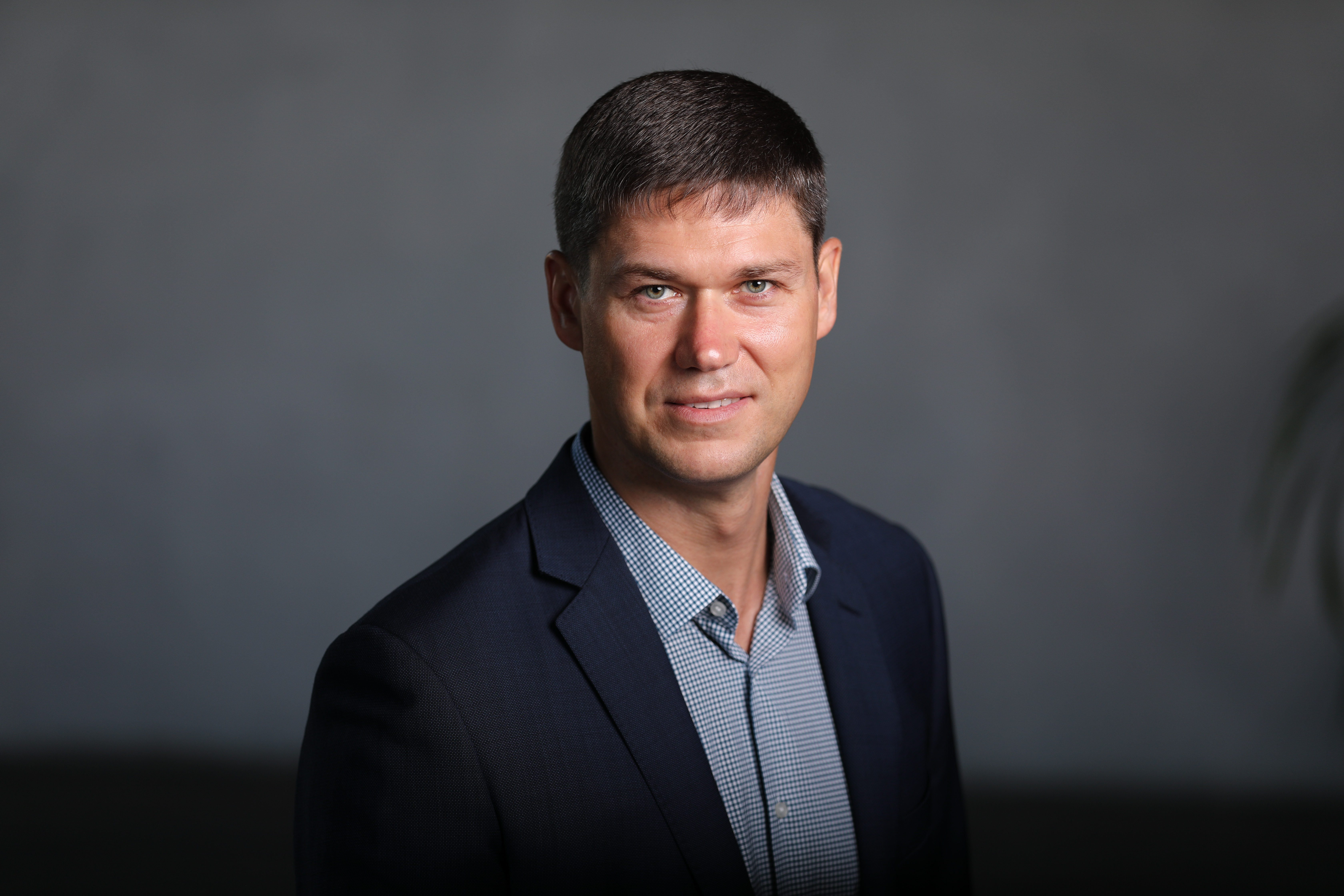

Member of the State Duma for Krasnodar Krai
- Incumbent
- Assumed office 12 October 2021
- Preceded by: Vladimir Sinyagovsky
- Constituency: Tuapse (No. 49)

Personal details
- Born: 23 February 1982 (age 44) Orsk, Orenburg Oblast, Russian SFSR, USSR
- Party: United Russia
- Children: 2
- Education: Petrozavodsk State University

Sergey Viktorovich Altukhov (Russian: Сергей Викторович Алтухов; born 23 February 1982, Orsk, Orenburg Oblast) is a Russian political figure, deputy of the 8th State Duma convocation. From 2004 to 2015, he occupied various positions in the Russian branches of international IT companies, including Microsoft and SAP. In 2015 he became a Deputy Governor of Krasnodar Krai. In 2021 he was elected to the State Duma of the 8th convocation, running from the United Russia. He represents the Tuapse constituency.

== Biography ==
Early life and education

Sergey Altukhov was born on 23 February 1982 in Orsk, Orenburg Oblast, and spent his childhood in Monchegorsk, Murmansk Oblast. In 2004 he graduated from Petrozavodsk State University with a degree in Automated Information Processing and Management Systems.

Career in telecommunications and IT

He worked in major telecommunications companies (Telecom XXI, MTS), and later in international IT companies (Microsoft Rus, SAP CIS), where he was responsible for business development in the regions.

Public service

In 2015 he was appointed Deputy Governor of Krasnodar Krai, overseeing housing and utilities, transport, communications, industry, investment, and small and medium-sized enterprises in the region.

Political career

In 2017 Altukhov was elected deputy of the Legislative Assembly of Krasnodar Krai from the Novorossiysk constituency. He became vice-speaker and chairman of the committee on industry, investment, entrepreneurship, communications, consumer and financial markets, and foreign economic activity.

In 2021 he was elected deputy of the State Duma of the VIII convocation from the Tuapse single-mandate constituency No. 49, joining the Committee on Economic Policy.

== Sanctions and criminal prosecution ==
Due to Russia’s invasion of Ukraine, he is under international sanctions imposed by the European Union, the United States, the United Kingdom, and several other countries.[3] On 22 March 2023, a Ukrainian court sentenced Altukhov in absentia to 15 years in prison with confiscation of property under the article on encroachment on the territorial integrity and inviolability of Ukraine.

He was sanctioned by the UK government in 2022 in relation to the Russo-Ukrainian War.

== Family ==
Sergey Altukhov is married and has two children.

== Awards ==
Order of Friendship (25 April 2025) — for contributions to the development of parliamentarianism, active legislative work, and many years of conscientious service.
