= Neftegorsk, Krasnodar Krai =

Neftegorsk Нефтегорск
- Urban-type settlement
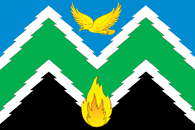
- Flag
- Interactive map of Neftegorsk
- Location of Neftegorsk Neftegorsk (Krasnodar Krai)
- Coordinates: 44.3558°N 39.7047°E
- Country: Russia
- Federal subject: Krasnodar Krai
- Administrative district: Apsheronsky District
- Elevation: 375 m (1,230 ft)

Population (2010 Census)
  - Total: 5,306
  - Estimate (2023): 4,749 (−10.5%)
- Time zone: UTC+3 (MSK)
- Postal codes: 352685, 352686
- OKTMO ID: 03605157051

Neftegorsk (Russian: Нефтего́рск) is an urban locality (an urban-type settlement) in Apsheronsky District of Krasnodar Krai, Russia. Population: 5,306 (2010 census); 4,724 (2002 census); 5,683 (1989 Soviet census).
