= Belorechensk, Krasnodar Krai =

Town in Krasnodar Krai, Russia

Belorechensk Белореченск
- Town
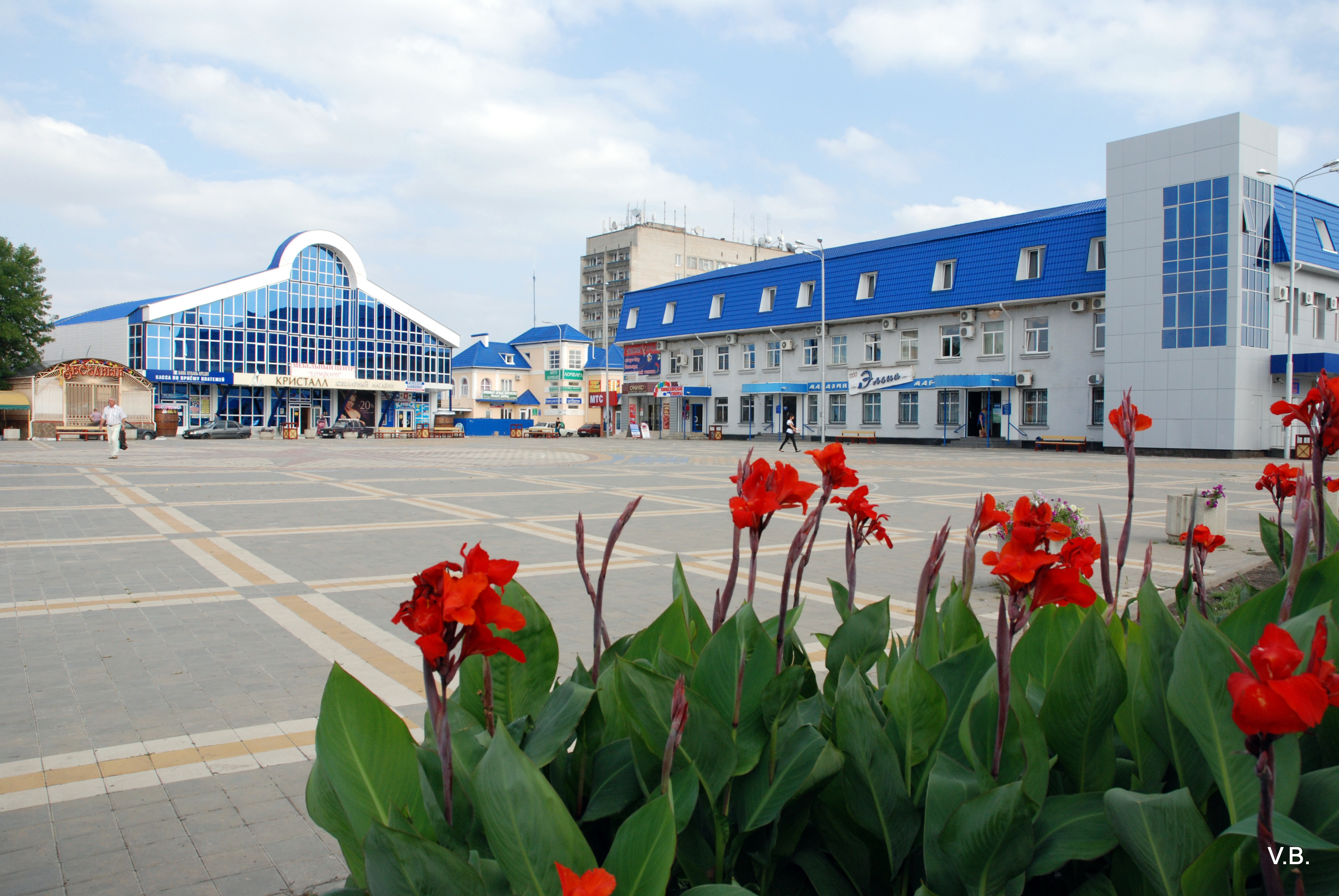
- Central Square in Belorechensk

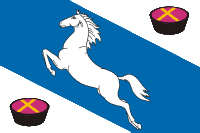
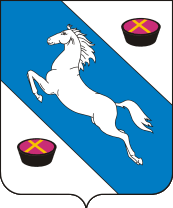
- Flag Coat of arms
- Interactive map of Belorechensk
- Location of Belorechensk Belorechensk (European Russia) Belorechensk (Russia)
- Coordinates: 44°46′07″N 39°52′24″E
- Country: Russia
- Federal subject: Krasnodar Krai
- Founded: 1862
- Town status since: 1958
- Elevation: 120 m (390 ft)

Population (2010 Census)
  - Total: 53,892
  - Estimate (2025): 54,190 (+0.6%)
  - Rank: 306th in 2010

Administrative status
  - Subordinated to: Town of Belorechensk
  - Capital of: Town of Belorechensk, Belorechensky District

Municipal status
  - Municipal district: Belorechensky Municipal District
  - Urban settlement: Belorechenskoye Urban Settlement
  - Capital of: Belorechensky Municipal District, Belorechenskoye Urban Settlement
- Time zone: UTC+3 (MSK)
- Postal code: 352630–352636
- OKTMO ID: 03608101001
- Website: www.gorodbelorechensk.ru

Belorechensk (Russian: Белоре́ченск) is a town in Krasnodar Krai, Russia, located on the Belaya River, from which it takes its name. It forms the municipal formation Belorechenskoye urban settlement, as the only locality in its composition. Population: 51,590 (2020), 53,892 (2010 census); 54,028 (2002 census); 51,177 (1989 Soviet census).

== History ==
It was established as a Cossack settlement in 1862. According to the 1926 census, it had a population of 14,947, 66.4% Russian and 24.5% Ukrainian. Town status was granted to it in 1958. During the Soviet period, a corrective labor camp was located here. Belorechensk was briefly occupied by Germany in the Second World War.

== Administrative and municipal status ==
Within the framework of administrative divisions, Belorechensk serves as the administrative center of Belorechensky District, even though it is not a part of it. As an administrative division, it is, together with the territory of Yuzhny Rural Okrug (which comprises three rural localities), incorporated separately as the Town of Belorechensk—an administrative unit with the status equal to that of the districts. As a municipal division, the town of Belorechensk is incorporated within Belorechensky Municipal District as Belorechenskoye Urban Settlement. Yuzhny Rural Okrug is incorporated within Belorechensky Municipal District as Yuzhnenskoye Rural Settlement.
