= Belorechensk =

Belorechensk may refer to:

- Belorechensk, Krasnodar Krai, a town in Krasnodar Krai, Russia
- Belorechensk, Kirov Oblast, a former urban-type settlement in Kirov Oblast, Russia; since 2005—a settlement
