= Belaya (Kuban) =

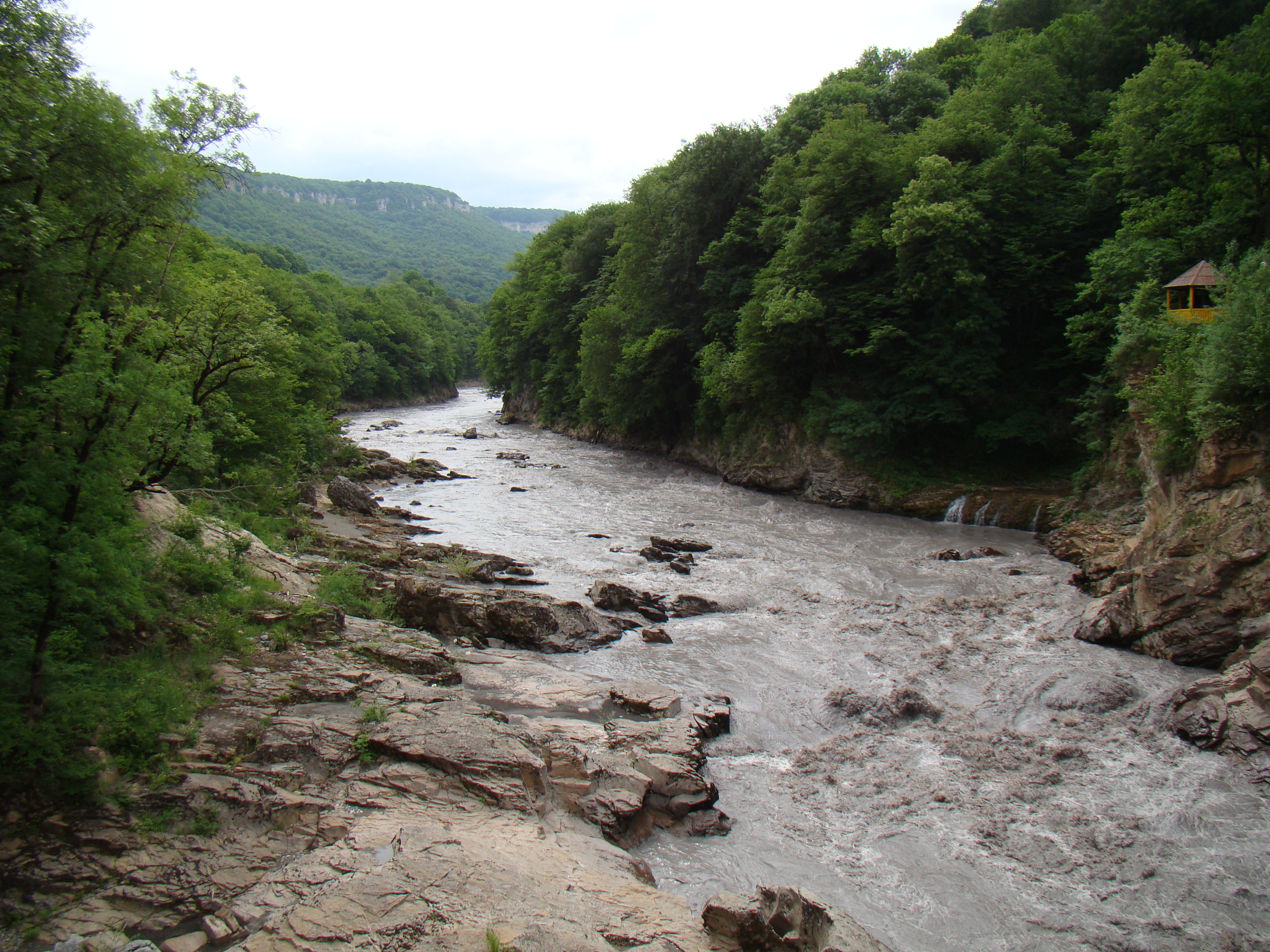

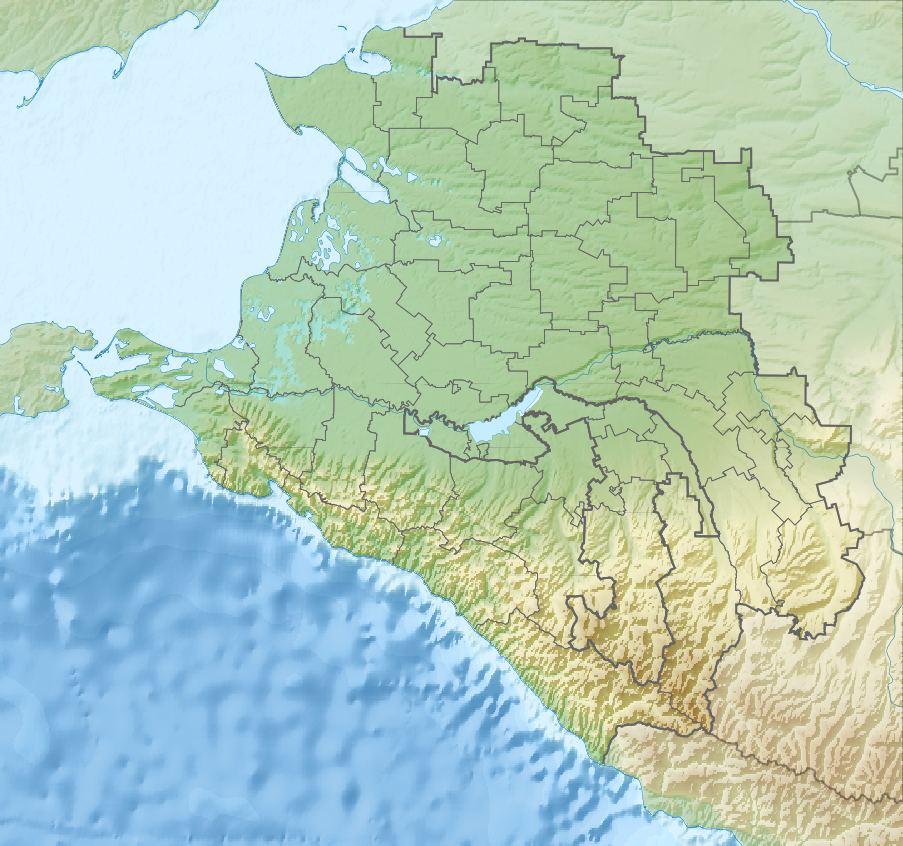
- Location within Krasnodar Krai Location within European Russia

Physical characteristics
- Mouth: Kuban
  - coordinates: 45°06′00″N 39°28′09″E
- Length: 265 km (165 mi)
- Basin size: 5,990 km^{2} (2,310 sq mi)

Basin features
- Progression: Kuban→ Sea of Azov

The Belaya (Russian: Белая [ˈbʲeɫəjə]; Adyghe: Шъхьагуащэ, romanized: Šhaguaśə, IPA: [ʂħaːɡʷaːɕɐ́]) is a river in the Republic of Adygea and Krasnodar Krai of Russia. It is a left tributary of the Kuban, which it joins in the Krasnodar Reservoir. The river is 265 kilometres (165 mi) long, with a drainage basin of 5,990 square kilometres (2,310 mi^{2}). It has its sources at the main watershed of the Caucasus Mountains. In its upper reaches it is a typical mountain river, and flows through deep canyons, while in its lower parts it is a slow flowing lowland river.

Its main tributaries are, from source to mouth, Kisha (right), Dakh (right), Kurdzhips (left) and Pshekha (left). Several cities and towns are located along the river including Maykop and Belorechensk.
