= Konstantin Zatulin =

Russian politician (born 1958)

- Константин Затулин
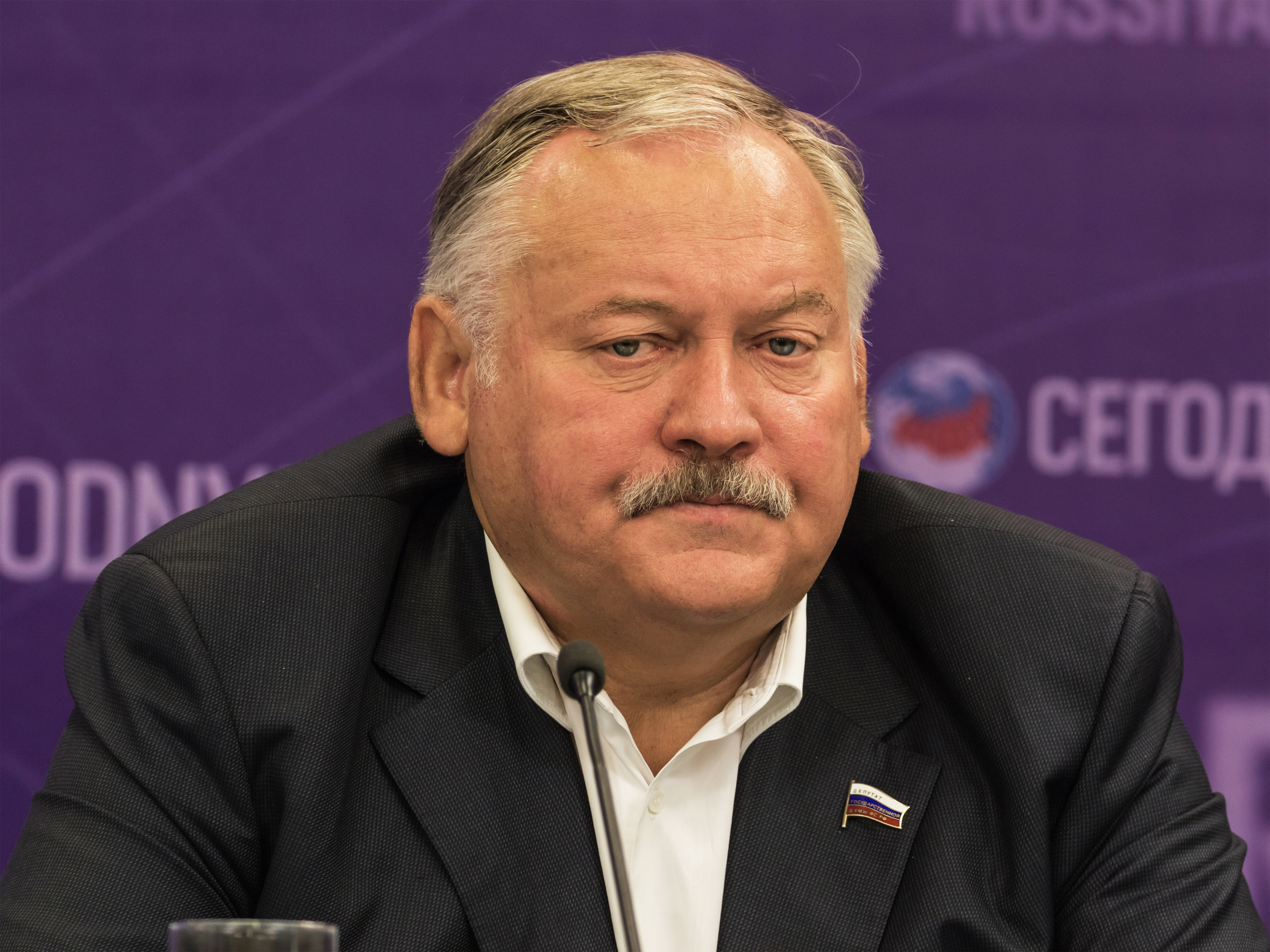
- Zatulin in 2017

Member of the State Duma for Krasnodar Krai
- Incumbent
- Assumed office 5 October 2016
- Preceded by: constituency re-established
- Constituency: Sochi (No. 50)

Member of the State Duma (Party List Seat)
- In office 24 December 2007 – 21 December 2011
- In office 11 January 1994 – 22 December 1995

Member of the State Duma for Moscow
- In office 29 December 2003 – 24 December 2007
- Preceded by: Andrey Nikolaev
- Succeeded by: constituencies abolished
- Constituency: Orekhovo–Borisovo constituency (No. 197)

Personal details
- Born: 7 September 1958 (age 68) Batumi, Adjarian ASSR, Georgian SSR, USSR
- Party: United Russia
- Other political affiliations: CPSU (before 1991); LDPR (1993–1995); Fatherland – All Russia (1998–2002)
- Education: Moscow State University

Konstantin Fyodorovich Zatulin (Russian: Константин Фёдорович Затулин; born 7 September 1958) is a Russian politician, first deputy chairman of the committee of the State Duma for the CIS and relations with Russian nationals abroad. He represents the Sochi constituency.

== Biography ==
Zatulin graduated from the History Department of Moscow State University in 1981, specializing in the history of the Communist Party of the Soviet Union. In 1987-1990, he worked in the Central Committee of the Komsomol. In the 1993 election, Zatulin was elected deputy in the State Duma, where he assumed the position of the chairman of the Committee for the Commonwealth of Independent States and relations with Russian nationals abroad. In the next 1995 election, Zatulin lost his mandate. Since the 1990s, Zatulin has been considered by the press as a champion of hard-line imperialist policies towards the former constituent republics of the Soviet Union. Due to his comments on the status of Crimea during 1996–2007, he was persona non-grata in Ukraine. Since the early 1990s, Zatulin has been a close associate of Mayor of Moscow, Yury Luzhkov, and in 1998 became a co-founder of Luzhkov's Fatherland Block. The block eventually merged with the All Russia block into Fatherland – All Russia, which in 2001 united with the Unity Party into United Russia. Zatulin assumed an important position within the leadership of that party, and with the 2003 election became a member of the State Duma once again and became first deputy chairman of the Committee for the Commonwealth of Independent States and relations with Russian nationals abroad. In October 2006, Zatulin said about the unrecognized Georgian breakaway republics of Abkhazia and South Ossetia: "Recognition of the so-called unrecognized states is not far off. Unrecognized republics have all attributes of state system and stable democratic system." In December 2007, Zatulin accused the Romanian Orthodox Church of "proselytism" against the Russian Orthodox Church in Moldova with the supposed aim of annexing these territories into Romania. He was reelected to the State Duma in the 2007 election. On 6 June 2006, Konstantin Zatulin and Vladimir Zhirinovsky were banned from entering Ukraine (were declared personae non-gratae) based on the Ukrainian law concerning foreigners' status, "foreigners are prohibited to enter the country if they violated Ukrainian legislation during their previous stay." The Ukrainian government accused Zatulin of trying to invoke ethnic violence and work against territorial integrity of the Ukrainian state. In July–August 2008 he was considered persona non-grata in Ukraine once again. In September 2008, shortly after the Georgian breakaway Republic of Abkhazia was recognized as independent by Russia, Abkhazian president Sergei Bagapsh awarded Zatulin honorary citizenship.

In 2016, Ukraine's Prosecutor General published wiretaps of telephone calls between Sergey Glazyev and various people in Ukraine and Russia involved in funding and organizing pro-Russian clashes (later referenced to as "Glazyev tapes"), including Zatulin, who confirmed that the intercepts were genuine, just "taken out of context".

In 2021, Zatulin said in an interview that "Ukraine is an enemy of the Russian Federation and we should do everything possible to ensure such Ukraine ceases its existence".

On 19 June 2022, Zatulin considered Kazakh president Tokayev’s statements in the St. Petersburg International Economic Forum were incorrect and threatened with measures “like with Ukraine.”

Zatulin has supported Russian irredentist aspirations in Northern Kazakhstan.

On 13 September 2022, in reaction to the September 2022 Armenia–Azerbaijan clashes, Zatulin blamed Azerbaijan for taking advantage of Russia's invasion of Ukraine to present a new ultimatum to Armenia, also implying Turkish involvement in Azerbaijan's actions—also stating that Russia must pacify Azerbaijan.

On 25 October 2022, Zatulin was informed by Armenian authorities that his visit to the country "would be considered undesirable", in reaction to his statements regarding Armenia.

=== Sanctions ===
He was sanctioned by the UK government on 11 March 2022 in relation to the Russo-Ukrainian War.
