= Kurdzhips =

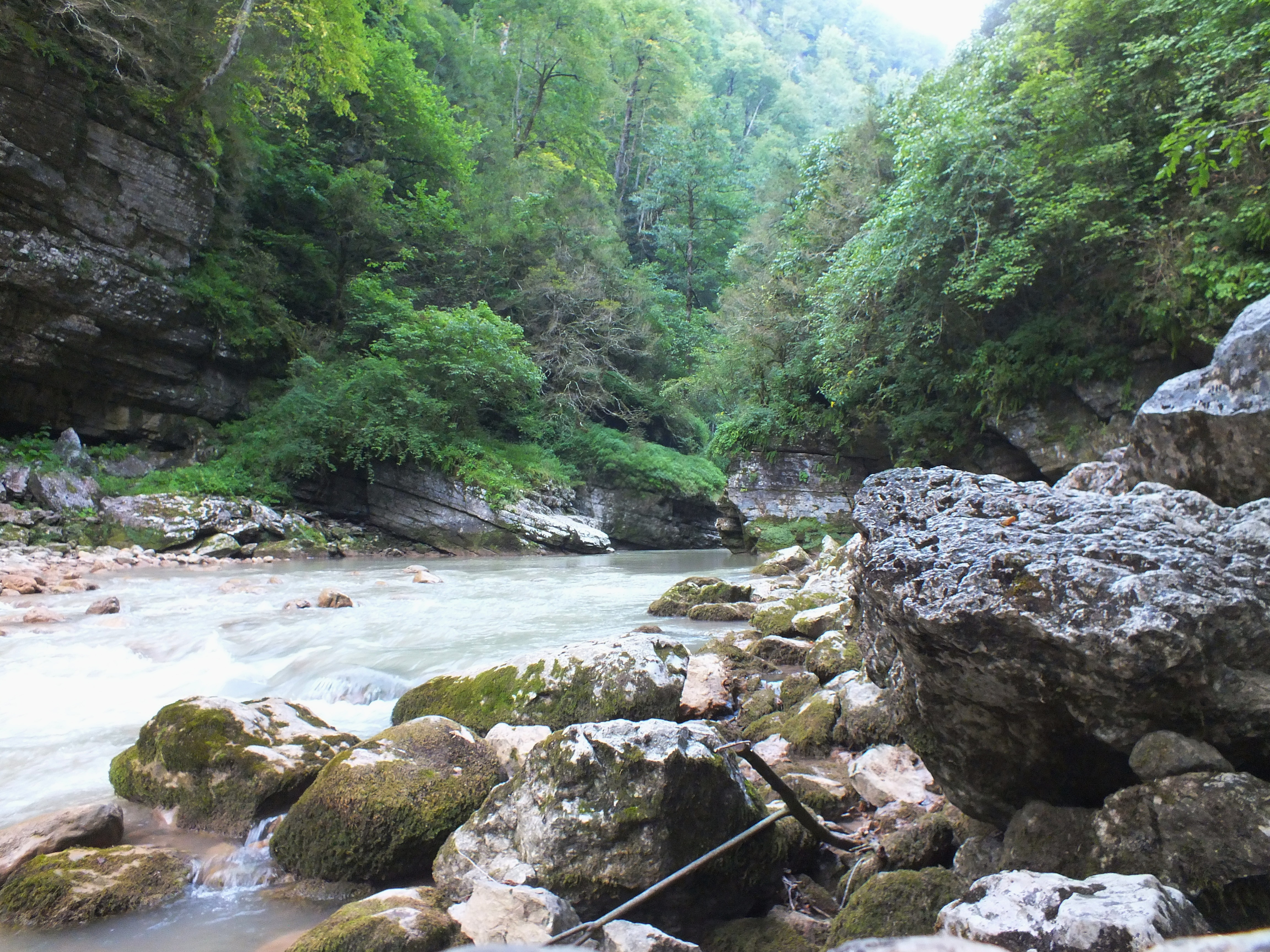
- Kurdzhips River in Guam Gorge

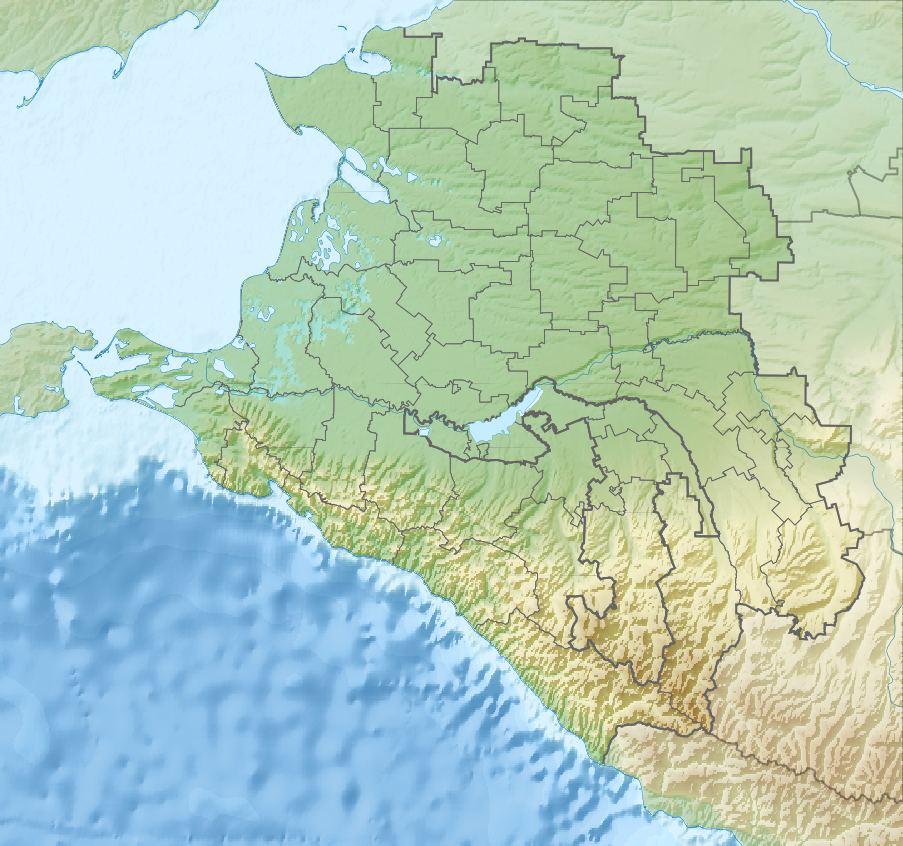
- Location within Krasnodar Krai Location within Caucasus Mountains Location within European Russia

Physical characteristics
- Mouth: Belaya
  - coordinates: 44.5786°N 40.0532°E
- Length: 100 km (62 mi)
- Basin size: 768 km^{2} (297 sq mi)

Basin features
- Progression: Belaya→ Kuban→ Sea of Azov

The Kurdzhips (Russian: Курджипс), located in the Caucasus Mountains, is a river in the Apsheronsky District of Krasnodar region, Russia. It is a left tributary of the Belaya near Maykop. It is 100 kilometres (62 mi) long, and has a drainage basin of 768 square kilometres (297 sq mi).

The river is a venue for wilderness and extreme sports. The river gained world attention in 2000 when Neanderthal remains were discovered in a cave on its banks.
