= Goryachy Klyuch, Krasnodar Krai =

Town in Krasnodar Krai, Russia

Goryachy Klyuch Горячий Ключ Псыфабэ (Adyghe)
- Town
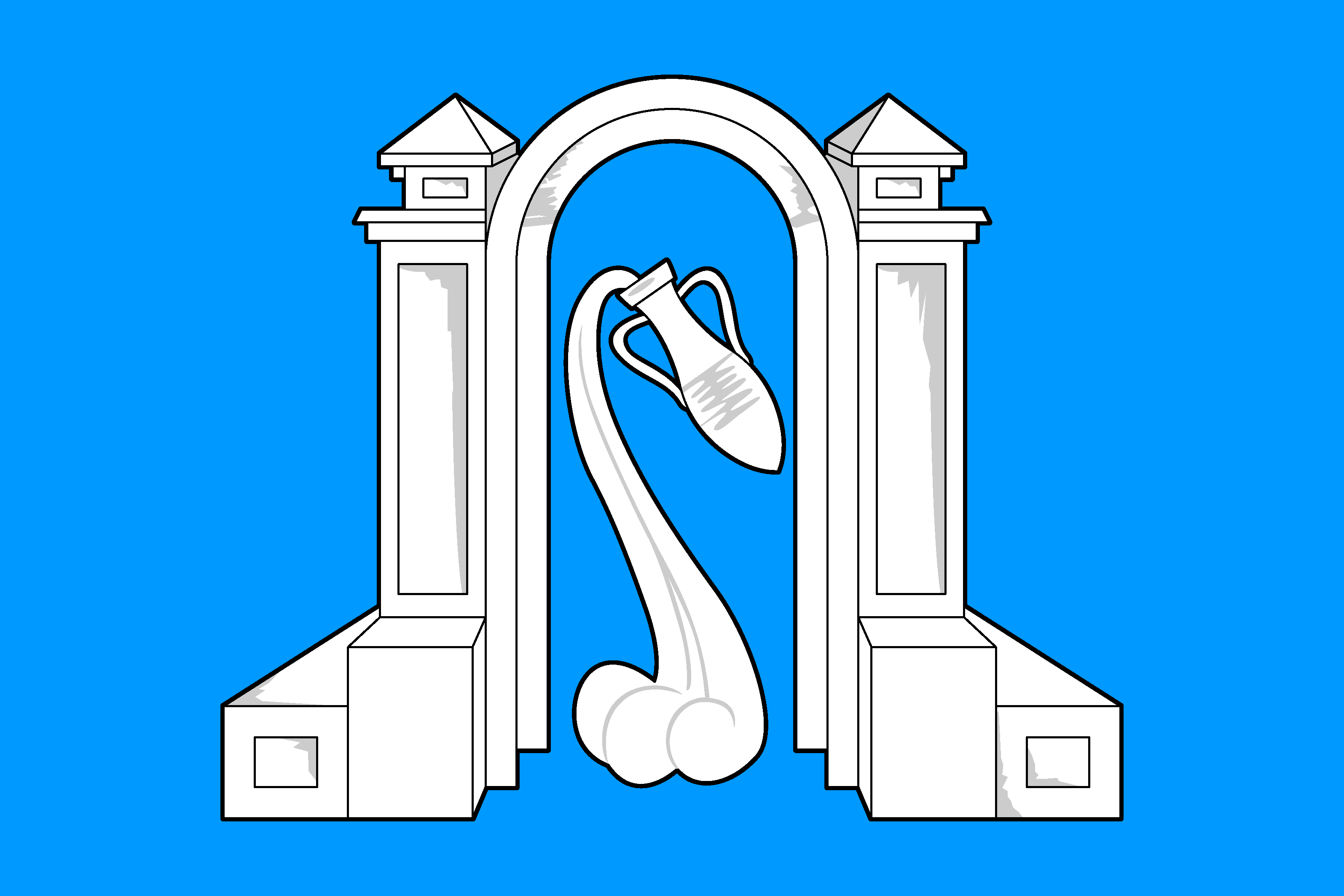
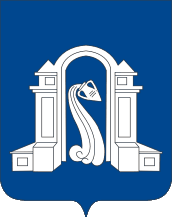
- Flag Coat of arms
- Interactive map of Goryachy Klyuch
- Location of Goryachy Klyuch Goryachy Klyuch (Krasnodar Krai)
- Coordinates: 44°38′N 39°08′E
- Country: Russia
- Federal subject: Krasnodar Krai
- Founded: 1864
- Town status since: 1965

Government
  - Head: Sergey Belopolskyi
- Elevation: 70 m (230 ft)

Population (2010 Census)
  - Total: 30,126
  - Estimate (2025): 42,634 (+41.5%)

Administrative status
  - Subordinated to: Town of Goryachy Klyuch
  - Capital of: Town of Goryachy Klyuch

Municipal status
  - Urban okrug: Goryachy Klyuch Urban Okrug
  - Capital of: Goryachy Klyuch Urban Okrug
- Time zone: UTC+3 (MSK)
- Postal code: 353290–353294
- OKTMO ID: 03709000001
- Website: www.gorkluch.ru

Goryachy Klyuch (Circassian: Псыфаб, Psəfab, lit. warm water; Russian: Горя́чий Ключ, lit. hot spring) is a town and a balneological resort in Krasnodar Krai, Russia, located on the Psekups River (Kuban's tributary) 65 kilometers (40 mi) south of Krasnodar, the administrative center of the krai. Population: 40,903 (2021 census); 30,126 (2010 census); 27,693 (2002 census); 25,610 (1989 Soviet census).

Historical population
Year	Pop.	±%
1939	3,330	—
1959	9,858	+196.0%
1970	19,808	+100.9%
1979	22,654	+14.4%
1989	25,610	+13.0%
2002	27,693	+8.1%
2010	30,126	+8.8%
2021	40,903	+35.8%
Source: Census data

== History ==
It was established in 1864 and granted town status in 1965.

== Administrative and municipal status ==
Within the framework of administrative divisions, it is, together with thirty rural localities, incorporated as the Town of Goryachy Klyuch—an administrative unit with the status equal to that of the districts. As a municipal division, the Town of Goryachy Klyuch is incorporated as Goryachy Klyuch Urban Okrug.

== Climate ==
Under the Köppen climate classification Goryachy Klyuch has a humid subtropical climate (Cfa). The rainfall is significant throughout the year. The average annual temperature is +12.2 °C (54.0 °F). The warmest month of the year is July with an average temperature of +23.1 °C (73.6 °F). In January, the average temperature is +1.8 °C (35.2 °F).

The driest month is September with 63 millimeters (2.5 in). Most precipitation falls in December, with an average of 102 millimeters (4.0 in). About 904 millimeters (35.6 in) of precipitation falls annually.

Climate data for Goryachy Klyuch
Month	Jan	Feb	Mar	Apr	May	Jun	Jul	Aug	Sep	Oct	Nov	Dec	Year
Record high °C (°F)	18.1 (64.6)	24.0 (75.2)	28.2 (82.8)	32.0 (89.6)	32.2 (90.0)	35.0 (95.0)	38.0 (100.4)	37.2 (99.0)	36.4 (97.5)	31.0 (87.8)	30.1 (86.2)	23.0 (73.4)	38.0 (100.4)
Mean daily maximum °C (°F)	5.0 (41.0)	5.5 (41.9)	9.1 (48.4)	16.1 (61.0)	21.2 (70.2)	25.0 (77.0)	27.6 (81.7)	27.5 (81.5)	22.8 (73.0)	16.8 (62.2)	11.4 (52.5)	7.3 (45.1)	16.3 (61.3)
Daily mean °C (°F)	1.8 (35.2)	2.1 (35.8)	5.2 (41.4)	11.6 (52.9)	16.6 (61.9)	20.5 (68.9)	23.1 (73.6)	22.9 (73.2)	18.1 (64.6)	12.4 (54.3)	7.9 (46.2)	4.2 (39.6)	12.2 (54.0)
Mean daily minimum °C (°F)	−1.4 (29.5)	−1.2 (29.8)	1.3 (34.3)	7.2 (45.0)	12.1 (53.8)	16.0 (60.8)	18.7 (65.7)	18.3 (64.9)	13.5 (56.3)	8.1 (46.6)	4.5 (40.1)	1.1 (34.0)	8.2 (46.8)
Record low °C (°F)	−29.0 (−20.2)	−27.2 (−17.0)	−24.6 (−12.3)	−2.3 (27.9)	−1.0 (30.2)	4.0 (39.2)	9.8 (49.6)	7.0 (44.6)	1.9 (35.4)	−8.0 (17.6)	−23.4 (−10.1)	−20.9 (−5.6)	−29.0 (−20.2)
Average precipitation mm (inches)	92 (3.6)	76 (3.0)	69 (2.7)	63 (2.5)	69 (2.7)	81 (3.2)	64 (2.5)	71 (2.8)	63 (2.5)	64 (2.5)	90 (3.5)	102 (4.0)	904 (35.5)
Source 1: climate-data.org
Source 2: climatebase.ru (records)
