= Apsheronsk =

Town in Krasnodar Krai, Russia

Apsheronsk Апшеронск
- Town
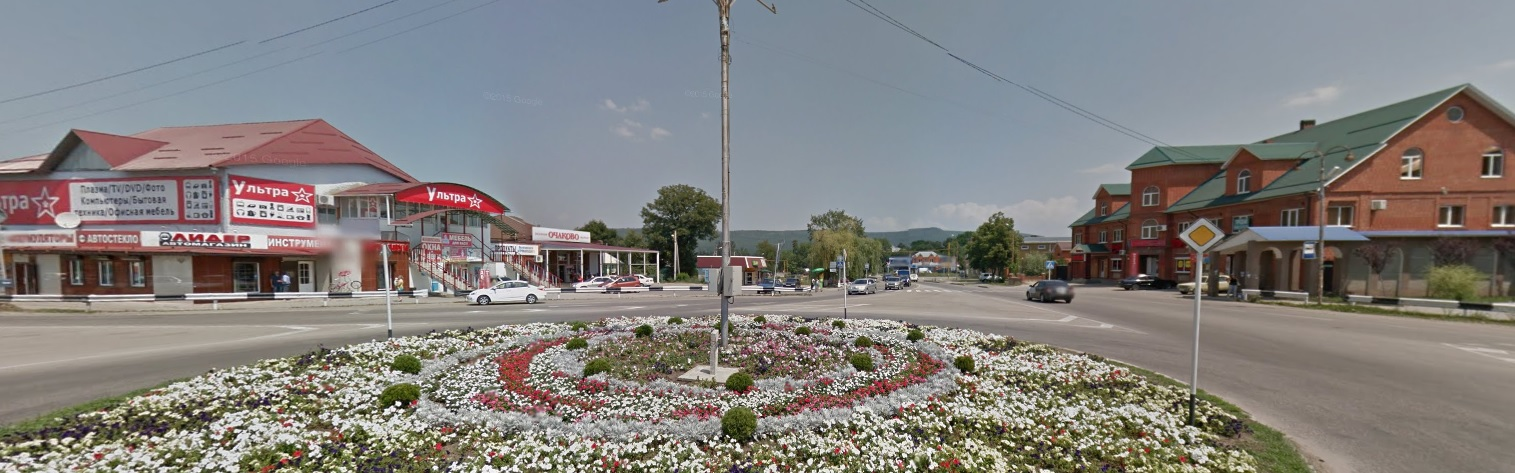
- City center, Apsheronsk

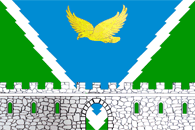
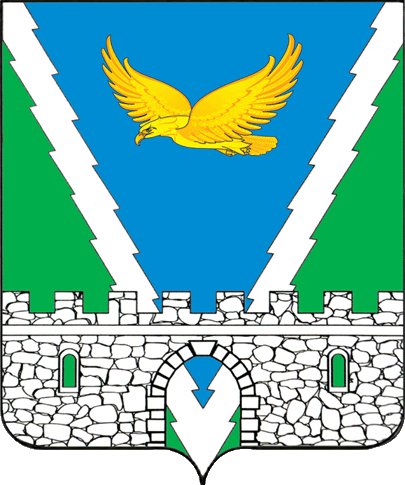
- Flag Coat of arms
- Interactive map of Apsheronsk
- Location of Apsheronsk Apsheronsk (European Russia) Apsheronsk (Russia)
- Coordinates: 44°28′N 39°44′E
- Country: Russia
- Federal subject: Krasnodar Krai
- Administrative district: Apsheronsky District
- TownSelsoviet: Apsheronsk
- Founded: 1863
- Town status since: 1947
- Elevation: 200 m (660 ft)

Population (2010 Census)
  - Total: 40,225
  - Estimate (2025): 39,047 (−2.9%)

Administrative status
  - Capital of: Apsheronsky District, Town of Apsheronsk

Municipal status
  - Municipal district: Apsheronsky Municipal District
  - Urban settlement: Apsheronskoye Urban Settlement
  - Capital of: Apsheronsky Municipal District, Apsheronskoye Urban Settlement
- Time zone: UTC+3 (MSK)
- Postal code: 352690
- Dialing code: +7 86152
- OKTMO ID: 03605101001
- Website: apr.apsheronsk-oms.ru

Apsheronsk (Russian: Апшеро́нск, until 1947: Apsheronskaya, Russian: Апшеронская, Ukrainian: Апшеронська, romanized: Apsheronska) is a town and the administrative center of Apsheronsky District of Krasnodar Krai, Russia, located on the Pshekha River (in the Kuban's basin). Population: 39,488 (2020), 40,225 (2010 census); 39,608 (2002 census); 34,505 (1989 Soviet census); 33,400 (1968); 4,615 (1926)

== Etymology ==
The town was named after the 81st Apsheron Infantry Regiment, as it was founded as a stanitsa near the regiment's camp. The regiment itself was named after the Absheron Peninsula, where it was stationed during the Russo-Persian War (1722–1723).

== History ==
It was founded in 1863 as the stanitsa of Apsheronskaya (Апшеронская). According to the 1926 census, the population was 58.2% Russian, 32.6% Ukrainian and 5.3% Greek.

During World War II, in 1942, the German occupiers operated the AGSSt 5 assembly center for prisoners of war in Apsheronsk.

== Geography ==
=== Climate ===
Under the Köppen climate classification Apsheronsk has a humid subtropical climate (Cfa).

There is significant rainfall throughout the year in Apsheronsk. The average annual temperature in Apsheronsk is 12.0 °C. The warmest month of the year is July with an average temperature of 22.5 °C. In January, the average temperature is 1.8 °C. It is the lowest average temperature of the whole year.

The driest month is February with 62 mm. Most precipitation falls in November and December, with an average of 94 mm. About 941 mm of precipitation falls annually.

Climate data for Apsheronsk
Month	Jan	Feb	Mar	Apr	May	Jun	Jul	Aug	Sep	Oct	Nov	Dec	Year
Mean daily maximum °C (°F)	5.2 (41.4)	5.7 (42.3)	9.4 (48.9)	16.1 (61.0)	21.0 (69.8)	24.7 (76.5)	27.3 (81.1)	27.3 (81.1)	22.9 (73.2)	17.0 (62.6)	11.6 (52.9)	7.3 (45.1)	16.3 (61.3)
Daily mean °C (°F)	1.8 (35.2)	2.2 (36.0)	5.3 (41.5)	11.3 (52.3)	16.1 (61.0)	19.9 (67.8)	22.5 (72.5)	22.3 (72.1)	17.8 (64.0)	12.4 (54.3)	7.9 (46.2)	4.0 (39.2)	12.0 (53.6)
Mean daily minimum °C (°F)	−1.6 (29.1)	−1.2 (29.8)	1.2 (34.2)	6.6 (43.9)	11.3 (52.3)	15.1 (59.2)	17.7 (63.9)	17.3 (63.1)	12.8 (55.0)	7.8 (46.0)	4.3 (39.7)	0.8 (33.4)	7.7 (45.9)
Average precipitation mm (inches)	87 (3.4)	62 (2.4)	66 (2.6)	69 (2.7)	78 (3.1)	92 (3.6)	74 (2.9)	76 (3.0)	73 (2.9)	76 (3.0)	94 (3.7)	94 (3.7)	941 (37)
Source: climate-data.org

== Administrative and municipal status ==
Within the framework of administrative divisions, Apsheronsk serves as the administrative center of Apsheronsky District. As an administrative division, it is, together with three rural localities, incorporated within Apsheronsky District as the Town of Apsheronsk. As a municipal division, the Town of Apsheronsk is incorporated within Apsheronsky Municipal District as Apsheronskoye Urban Settlement.

== Economy ==
The town's main industries are forestry and woodworking.

=== Transportation ===
The Apsheronsk narrow-gauge railway is the longest railway of its type in Russia.
