= Belorechensky District =

Belorechensky District Белореченский район (Russian)
- District
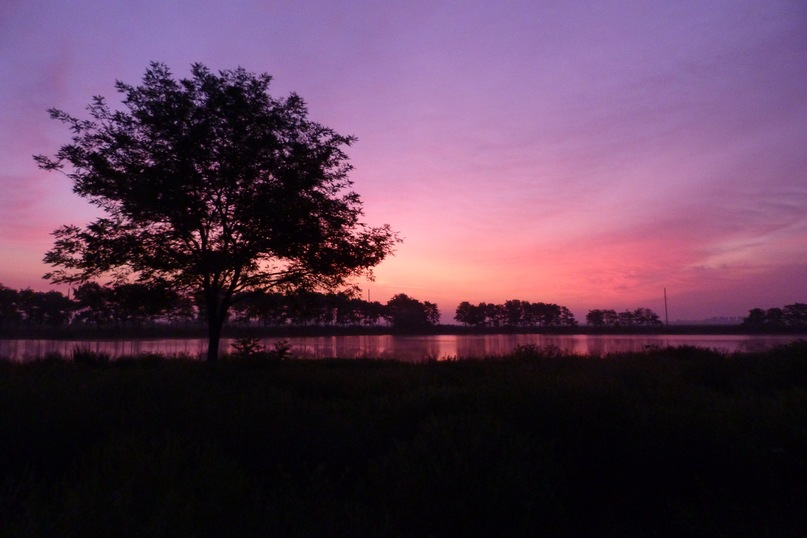
- Village Velikovechnoe, Belorechensky District

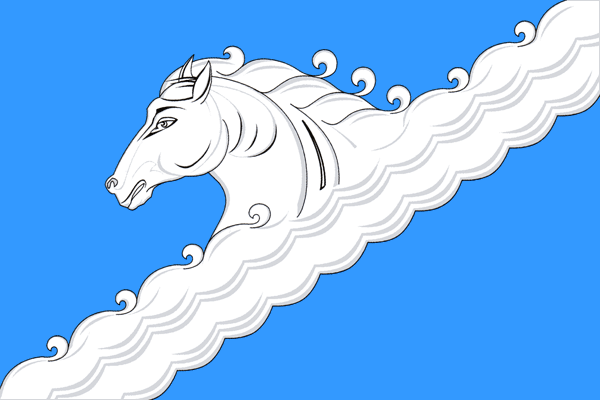
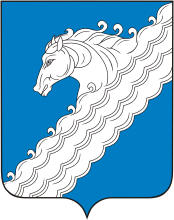
- Flag Coat of arms
- Location of Belorechensky District in Krasnodar Krai
- Coordinates: 44°46′N 39°52′E
- Country: Russia
- Federal subject: Krasnodar Krai
- Established: 2 June 1924
- Administrative center: Belorechensk

Area
  - Total: 1,323 km^{2} (511 sq mi)

Population (2010 Census)
  - Total: 45,149
  - Density: 34.13/km^{2} (88.39/sq mi)
  - Urban: 0%
  - Rural: 100%

Administrative structure
  - Administrative divisions: 9 Rural okrugs
  - Inhabited localities: 59 rural localities

Municipal structure
  - Municipally incorporated as: Belorechensky Municipal District
  - Municipal divisions: 1 urban settlements, 10 rural settlements
- Time zone: UTC+3 (MSK)
- OKTMO ID: 03608000
- Website: http://www.belorechensk.ru/

Belorechensky District (Russian: Белоре́ченский райо́н) is an administrative district (raion), one of the thirty-eight in Krasnodar Krai, Russia. As a municipal division, it is incorporated as Belorechensky Municipal District. It is located in the southern central part of the krai, but is bordered for the main part by the Republic of Adygea. The area of the district is 1,323 square kilometers (511 sq mi). Its administrative center is the town of Belorechensk (which is not administratively a part of the district). Population: 45,149 (2010 census); 43,542 (2002 census); 37,626 (1989 Soviet census).

Historical population
Year	Pop.	±%
1939	45,969	—
1959	74,421	+61.9%
1970	81,104	+9.0%
1979	87,498	+7.9%
1989	37,626	−57.0%
2002	43,542	+15.7%
2010	45,149	+3.7%
2021	107,295	+137.6%
Source: Census data

== Administrative and municipal status ==
Within the framework of administrative divisions, Belorechensky District is one of the thirty-eight in the krai. The town of Belorechensk serves as its administrative center, despite being incorporated separately as an administrative unit with the status equal to that of the districts (and which, in addition to Belorechensk, also includes three rural localities).

As a municipal division, the district is incorporated as Belorechensky Municipal District, with the Town of Belorechensk being incorporated within it as Belorechenskoye Urban Settlement.
