= Apsheronsky District =

Apsheronsky District Апшеронский район (Russian)
- District
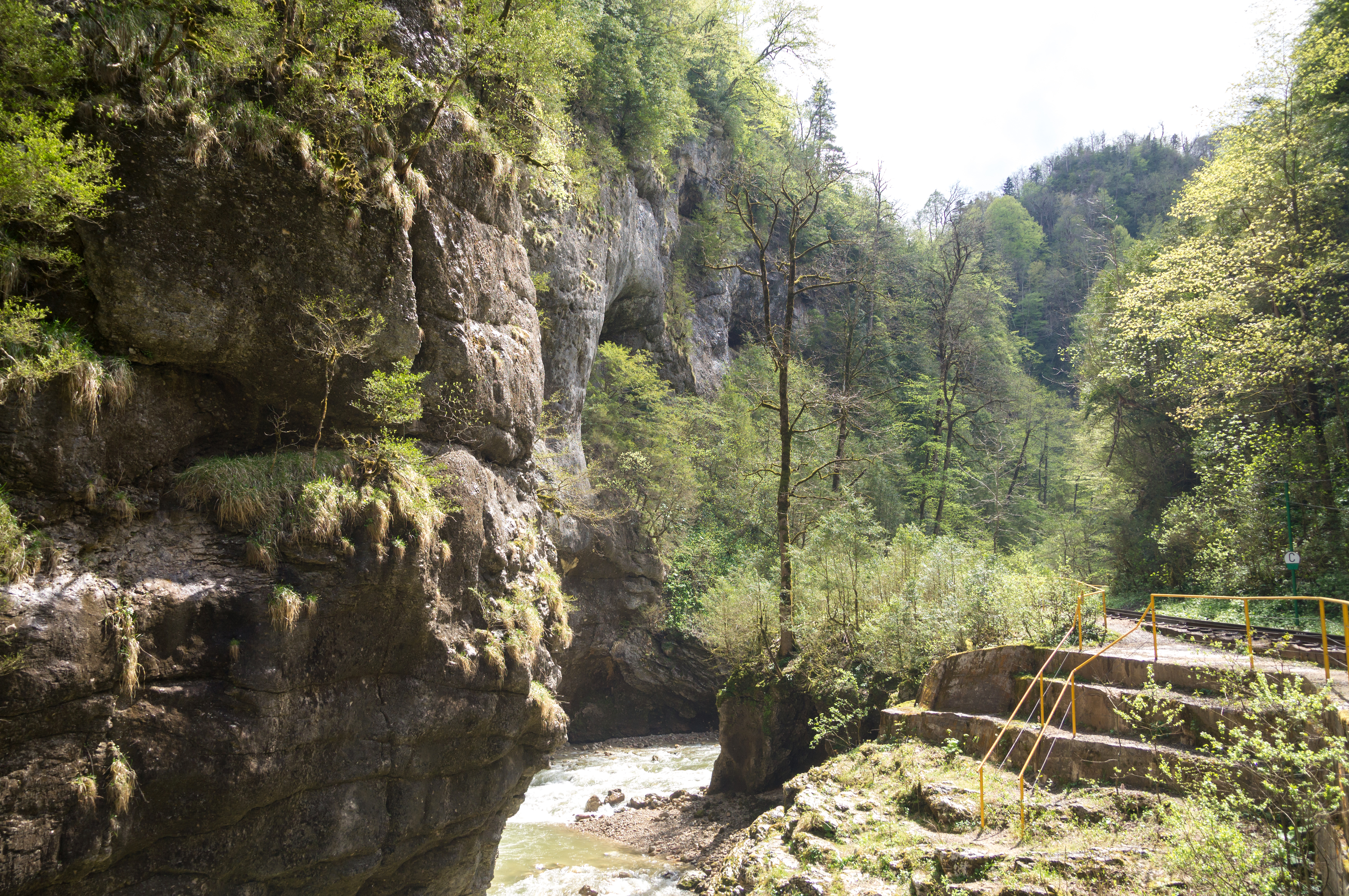
- The Kurdzhips River in the Guam Gorge, Apsheronsky District

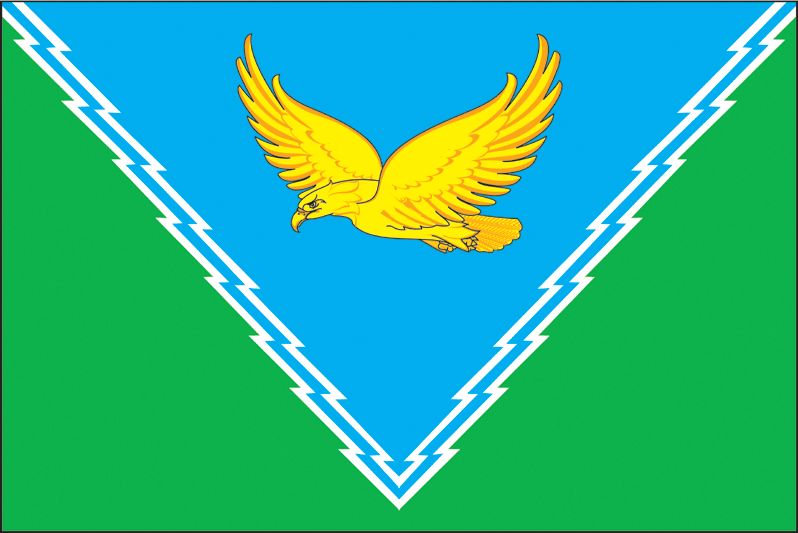
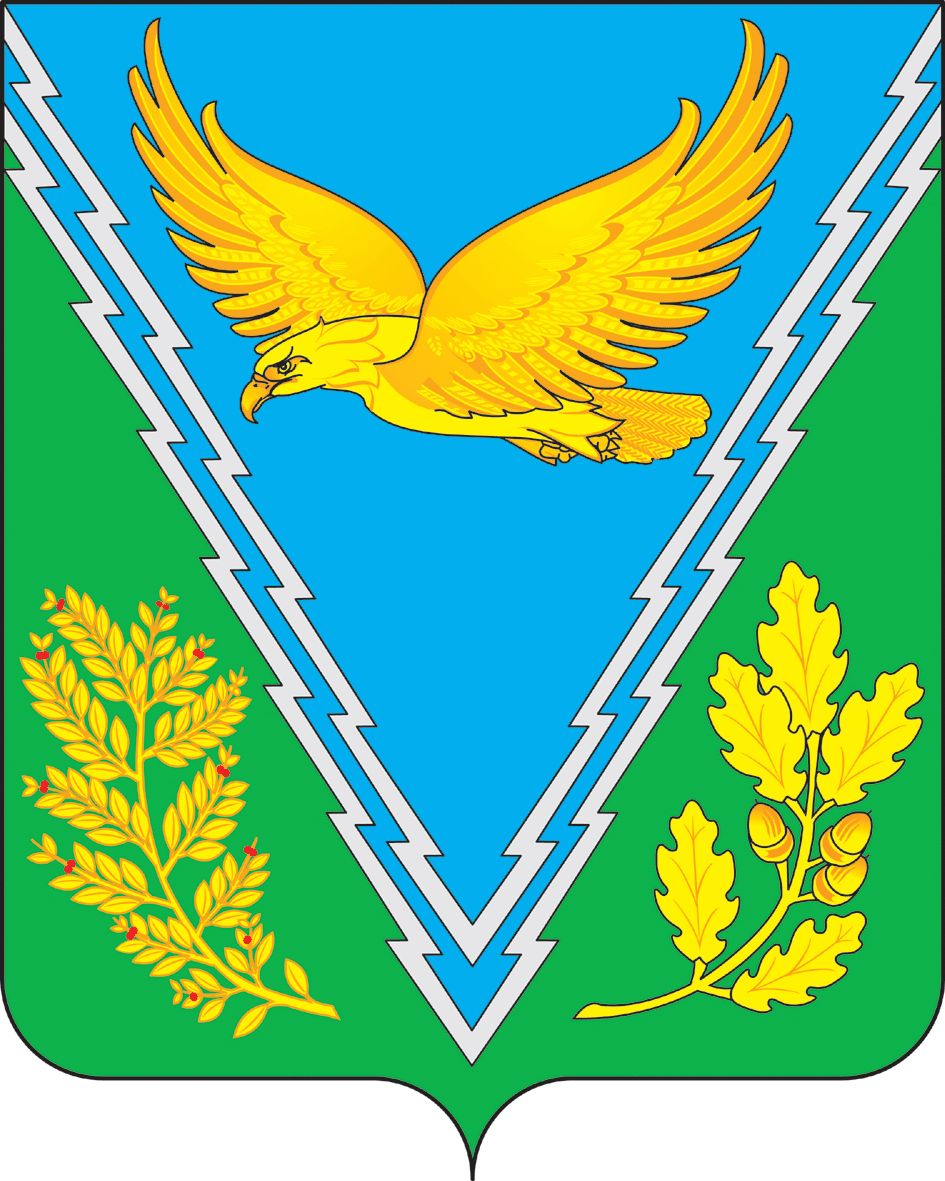
- Flag Coat of arms
- Location of Apsheronsky District in Krasnodar Krai
- Coordinates: 44°27′03″N 39°44′33″E
- Country: Russia
- Federal subject: Krasnodar Krai
- Established: 2 June 1924
- Administrative center: Apsheronsk

Area
  - Total: 2,443.2 km^{2} (943.3 sq mi)

Population (2010 Census)
  - Total: 98,891
  - Density: 40.476/km^{2} (104.83/sq mi)
  - Urban: 67.9%
  - Rural: 32.1%

Administrative structure
  - Administrative divisions: 2 Towns, 1 Settlement okrugs, 9 Rural okrugs
  - Inhabited localities: 2 cities/towns, 1 urban-type settlements, 49 rural localities

Municipal structure
  - Municipally incorporated as: Apsheronsky Municipal District
  - Municipal divisions: 3 urban settlements, 9 rural settlements
- Time zone: UTC+3 (MSK)
- OKTMO ID: 03605000
- Website: http://apsheronsk-oms.ru/

Apsheronsky District (Russian: Апшеро́нский райо́н) is an administrative district (raion), one of the thirty-eight in Krasnodar Krai, Russia. As a municipal division, it is incorporated as Apsheronsky Municipal District. It is located in the south of the krai. The area of the district is 2,443.2 square kilometers (943.3 sq mi). Its administrative center is the town of Apsheronsk. Population: 98,685 (2021 census); 98,891 (2010 census); 95,048 (2002 census); 86,059 (1989 Soviet census). The population of Apsheronsk accounts for 40.7% of the district's total population.

== Transportation ==
Apsheronsk narrow-gauge railway, opened in 1927, is the largest mountain railway of its type in Russia.
