= Chebsin =

Extinct Circassian tribe

The Chobsin (Adyghe: Цопсынэ, romanized: Tchopsınə) were a Circassian tribe. They were destroyed in the Circassian genocide following the Russo-Circassian War.

== Etymology ==
Tchopsin in translation from Adyghe means "ox spring".

== History ==
The Chobsins were recognized in the historiography and ethnography of the Caucasus until the end of the Russian-Circassian War.

The Chopsin tribe traces its origins to the Bzhedugs. According to accounts recorded from oral sources, a Bzhedug prince named Basteqo left Bzhedugia with his subjects and migrated to the Black Sea coast. As their numbers were small, they largely integrated into the Natukhaj. Since the Natukhaj did not allow the dominance of princes, the princely Basteqo dynasty were without privileges and largely ineffective.

In the aftermath of the Russo-Circassian War, with the Chobsin people's land occupied, the survivors migrated to Natukhaj. During the ensuing Circassian genocide, the Natukhaj were exterminated. The few survivors migrated to Turkey, where they were assimilated into other tribes or the Turks.

After the end of the Russian-Circassian War, the Chobsins were no longer mentioned, as they were destroyed in the Circassian genocide. The dialect of the Adyghe language was also lost.

== Mentions by historians and travelers ==
1857 - Lyulie, Leonty Yakovlevich wrote:

"...The Chobsins, relatives of the Zhaneys, (Note: As the Chobsins are of Bzhedug origin, this inference is incorrect.) are now only a memory, giving their names to one of the valleys adjacent to the Black Sea. They were mostly destroyed, now they have merged with the Natukhaj..."

1871 - Russian historian, academician, lieutenant general Nikolai Fedorovich Dubrovin wrote:

"...Among the Natukhaj, people of three other Adyghe tribes were destroyed and merged: Chobsin, Khegayk, and Khatuq or Adale, who lived on the Taman peninsula, now scattered in different places among the Natukhaj people..."
