= Battle of Pshada River (1713) =

Series of military conflicts

Crimean–Circassian War (1713)
- Part of Crimean–Circassian wars
Date	1713
Location	Lesser Zhaney, Circassia
Result	Circassian victory

Belligerents
Crimean Khanate	(Circassia) Coastal Circassians; Shapsug; Natukhaj

Commanders and leaders
(Crimean Khanate) Devlet Giray (POW) ?	(Circassia) Nemere Shubs

Casualties and losses
Heavy losses	Uncertain

The Battle of Pshada River (1713) was a battle that took place near the Pshada River, the expedition was launched by the Crimean Khanate against the Circassian tribes of Natukhaj and Shapsug near the Circassian coast.

== History ==
In 1713, Crimean Khan Devlet II Giray launched an expedition into Lesser Zhaney, a region in western Circassia. His forces advanced along the Pshada River, where they encountered a coalition of Circassian warriors consisting Shapsugs and Natukhajs, led by the Shapsug noble Nemere Shubs. The Circassian and Crimean forces clashed near the river, resulting in a decisive victory for the Circassians.

Devlet II Giray, the khan of Crimea, was captured by the Circassian forces, However Shubs later decided to release the khan. Some accounts describe that, as a symbolic act of humiliation, Devlet Giray was placed on a camel facing its tail before being sent back to the Crimean Khanate. The event is recorded in Circassian songs as follows;

“Go to Crimea,” Nemira-Shubs said to the captive khan, “but since you love the Shapsugs, we have mounted you on a camel so that, when you return to Crimea, you will always look at our mountains.”

Capture of the Crimean khan Devlet II Giray is only mentioned in folkloric accounts.
