= Hytuk =

Extinct Circassian tribe

The Hytuk or Adale (Adyghe: Хытыку; Italian and Latin: Getici; Tatar: Adale) was a Circassian tribe centered on the Taman Peninsula which their principality lived during the 14th and 15th centuries.

The principality was considered as one of the major Circassian coastal formations of the late medieval Black Sea region and played a significant role in the economic and political relations between Circassia, the Genoese colonies, and the Crimean Khanate.

After the fall of the principality, the Hytuks merged with the Natukhaj tribe. During the Circassian genocide, the Natukhaj tribe was almost completely destroyed which lead to the near disappearance of the Hytuks as well.

== Etymology ==
The word Hytuk is a Circassian word derived from хы meaning 'sea' and тыку meaning 'corner' or 'enclosure', and together means 'people by the sea' or 'islanders'. This etymology aligns with the geography of the region.

The term Hytuk remained in use to describe the Circassian speakers of that region. By the 1700s, the Kheghache tribe lived in Anapa and the Taman Peninsula which was the direct descendants of the earlier Hytuk tribe. Guillaume Delisle's maps from the early 18th century refers to Taman as Pays de Ladda, meaning Land of Ladda. This name most likely comes from the Turkish word "ada" which translates to island.

The Circassian term Hytuk, meaning "islanders," have been rendered into Turkic-Tatar as adale, derived from the word ada meaning "island".

== History ==
By the 14th and 15th centuries, the Hytuk Principality was one of the most significant feudal powers of Circassia (Zichia). Its capital city Matrega functioned as the main port, trade, and Catholic Christian center of Zichia, since it was hosting the Archbishop of the Circassians. The principality’s strategic location allowed it to dominate trade routes connecting the Genoese colony of Caffa (modern-day Feodosia) and the northern Black Sea coast.

The Hytuk rulers were recognized in Italian sources as independent princes (domini Gethiticorum). In 1446, Caffa officials sought mediation from "Usdemoroch, Lord of the Getici" (Usdemoroch dominus Gethiticorum) in a territorial dispute with the Crimean Khan. Usdemoroch could be a variant form of Ozdemiruq, meaning the son of Ozdemir in Circassian.

The Ghisolfi family was a wealthy Genoese dynasty which had established close ties with the Circassian ruling princely dynasty or branch in Hytuk. In 1419, Viccenty de Ghisolfi settled in Matrega as the son-in-law and vassal of the local Circassian ruler prince. His descendants, most notably Zaccaria de Ghisolfi, continued to govern Matrega and act as intermediaries between Genoa and the regional Circassian nobility.

Zaccaria de Ghisolfi referred that his grandfather Simon had allegiance to Prince Jambek, whose lineage continued to become the ruler of Matrega and possibly the entire Taman Peninsula; Jambek's son Kostomok and Kostomok's son Kadibeld. Despite the nominal Genoese governance of Matrega, Zaccaria’s authority was relying on the support of the local Circassian aristocracy.

Genoese records from 1472 state that Zaccaria could not arrest debtors due to the "proximity of the Getici lords and people" (propter vicinitatem dominorum et populorum geticorum).

The Hytuk Principality was part of a broader network of Circassian feudal entities, including Copa and Kremuk. These domains maintained mutual political and economic interests. The Copa (or Kopa) region, near modern Slavyansk-na-Kubani, and Kremuk was cooperating with Hytuk in trade agreements and military alliances.

In 1467, a Genoese aristocrat proposed assembling a military force on the Taman Peninsula, which at that time was part of the Hytuk Principality, to support Nur Devlet against his brother Mengli Giray. The control of Matrega gave Hytuk significant influence in regional power struggles.

The fall of Matrega in 12 August 1482 marked the end of the Hytuk Principality’s political independence. When the fortress was taken by the Ottomans, Genoese authority in the region also disappeared, but the local Circassian princes (Jambek branch) remained to rule the local population. Zaccaria de Ghisolfi’s letters show that these princes, called the "signori gotici" continued to control parts of Taman Peninsula and demanded payments to stay allied. In the following centuries, the Hytuk population survived and their descendants was a part of the Kheghache people maintained the social and territorial traditions from the Hytuk Principality, thus became its succeeded.

During the Russo-Circassian War, the remaining Hytuk people were living among the Natukhajs in small numbers. During the Circassian genocide, as the Natukhaj were exterminated, most of those survivors were killed. A small portion of them fled to Turkey, where they were assimilated into Turks or other tribes.

== Geography ==
The Hytuk people inhabited the Taman Peninsula between the Azov and Black Seas, including coastal towns like Matrega. Their location offered access to major sea and land trade routes connecting Circassia, Crimea, and the Caucasus, making the region one of the most prosperous areas of medieval Circassia.

== Mentions ==
In 1773, German explorer Johann Anton Güldenstädt reported about the Hytuk. After the end of the Russo-Circassian War in 1871, Russian historian and academician Lieutenant General N.F. Dubrovin wrote:

" ... Among the Natukhaj people lived three other Adyghe tribes, who were destroyed and merged: Chebsin, Khegayk, and Hytuk or Adale, who lived on the Taman peninsula, and now scattered in different places among the Natukhaj people ..."
