= Circassians =

Northwest Caucasian ethnic group

Адыгэхэр (Adyghe) Адыгэхэр (Kabardian)
- Circassian national flag

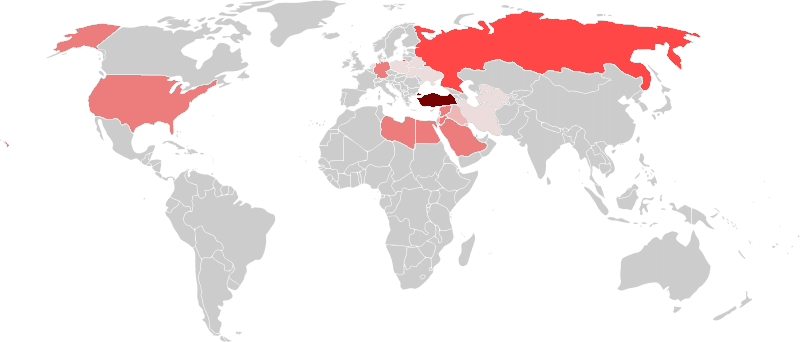
- Map of the Circassian diaspora

Total population
- c. 5.3 million

Regions with significant populations
- Turkey: 2,000,000–3,000,000
- Russia: Adygea; Krasnodar Krai; Kabardino-Balkaria; Karachay-Cherkessia: 751,487
- Jordan: 100,000–250,000
- Syria: 80,000–120,000
- Egypt: 50,000
- Germany: 40,000
- Libya: 35,000
- Iraq: 34,000
- United States: 25,000
- Saudi Arabia: 23,000
- Iran: 5,000–50,000
- Israel: 4,000–5,000
- Uzbekistan: 1,257
- Ukraine: 1,000
- Poland: 1,000
- Netherlands: 500
- Canada: 400
- Belarus: 116
- Turkmenistan: 54

Languages
- Circassian languages (Adyghe and Kabardian), Ubykh

Religion
- Predominantly Sunni Islam, minority Orthodox Christianity and Khabzeism

Related ethnic groups
- Abkhazians, Abazins, and other Northwest Caucasian peoples

The Circassians, also known as the Cherkess or the Adyghe (Adyghe and Kabardian: Адыгэхэр, IPA: [aːdɘɣəxə́r]), are a Northwest Caucasian ethnic group native to Circassia, a region and former country in the North Caucasus. As a consequence of the 19th-century Russo-Circassian War and the Circassian genocide, most Circassians were exiled from their homeland and scattered in what was then the Ottoman Empire (modern-day Turkey, Southeastern Europe and the Middle East). The two Circassian languages natively spoken by the Circassian people are western Circassian, or Adyghe, and eastern Circassian, or Kabardian. The Ubykh language went extinct with the 1992 death of its last speaker, Tevfik Esenç.

The vast majority of Circassians are Muslim; Sunni Islam became the dominant religion during the 17th century, following a long period of Islamisation. Circassia has been repeatedly invaded since ancient times; its isolated terrain coupled with the strategic value external societies have placed on the region, have greatly shaped the Circassian national identity as a whole.

The Circassian flag consists of a green field charged with 12 gold stars and, in the centre, three crossed arrows. The stars represent the 12 Circassian tribes: the Abzakh, the Besleney, the Bzhedugh, the Hatuqay, the Kabardians, the Mamkhegh, the Natukhaj, the Shapsugh, the Chemirgoy, the Ubykh, the Yegeruqway, and the Zhaney.

Circassians have played major roles in areas where they settled: in Turkey, those of Circassian origin have had massive influence, being instrumental in the Turkish War of Independence and among the elites of Turkey's intelligence agency. In Jordan, they founded the capital city Amman, and continue to play a major role in the country. In Syria, they served as the volunteer guards of the Allies upon their entry into the country and still occupy high positions. In Libya, they serve in high military positions. In Egypt, they were part of the ruling class. The largest Circassian clan in the country also contributed to Egyptian and Arabic cultural literary, intellectual, and political life starting with the reign of Muhammad Ali Pasha in Egypt and continuing to the modern day: the Abaza family.

In the Soviet Union, historical Circassia was divided into the republics of Adygea, Kabardino-Balkaria, Karachay-Cherkessia, Krasnodar Krai, and southwestern parts of Stavropol Krai. Accordingly, Circassians have been designated as Adygeans in Adygea, Kabardians in Kabardino-Balkaria, Cherkess in Karachay-Cherkessia, and Shapsug in Krasnodar Krai; all four are essentially the same people. Today, approximately 800,000 Circassians remain in historical Circassia, while 4,500,000 live elsewhere, mostly in Turkey.

== Ethnonyms ==
=== Adyghe ===
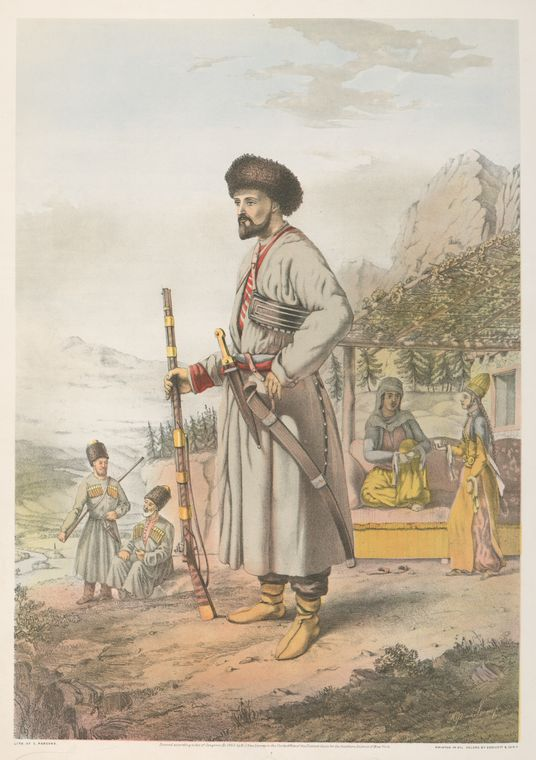
Circassian warrior armed with Khirimi, Kindjal, & Shashka.

The Circassians refer to themselves as Adyghe (also transliterated as Adyga, Adiga, Adige, Adığe, Adyge, Adygei). According to one view, the name derives from Atyghe (Adyghe: Iатыгъэ, romanized: 'atığə) meaning "high [in altitude]" to signify a mountaineer, as the Circassian people have lived in and near the mountains for thousands of years.

The medieval Circassian people known as Zygii were called "Adzakha" in the Bosporus inscriptions, leading to a theory that their endonym was originally Adzigha (Adyghe: Адзыгъэ), which eventually evolved into Adyghe.

=== Circassian, Cherkess ===
The word Circassian (/sərˈkæsiənz/ sər-KASS-ee-ənz) is an exonym, Latinized from Russian Cherkess (Russian: Черкес; Adyghe: Чэркэс/Шэрджэс), which is of debated origin. The term, in Russian, was traditionally applied to all Circassians before Soviet times, but it has since usually referred only to Circassians living in northern Karachay-Cherkessia, a federal subject of Russia, where they are indigenous and were about 12% of the population in 2010. In English, it still refers to all Circassians.

The origin of the term "Circassian" is disputed. One view is that its root stems from Turkic languages, and means "head choppers" or "warrior killers", because of the Circassians' battle practices. Other sources argue that the term comes from Mongolian Jerkes, meaning "one who blocks a path". Some believe it comes from the ancient Greek name of the region, Siraces. According to another view, its origin is Persian and combines two parts, kar ("mountain") and kās ("region", in Pahlavi), meaning "mountainous region". The spelling Cherkess may be an abbreviation of Persian Chahār-kas ("four people"), denoting four tribes. Ali ibn al-Athir (died c. 1232/3) and Ibn Khaldun (died 1406) used the term Jahārkas, but the Persian hypothesis remains uncertain.

In early Russian sources, Circassians are called Kasogi, but one view holds that the modern term "Cherkes" derives from Kerket, the name of one of the ancient Circassian tribes.

In languages spoken geographically close to the Caucasus, the native people originally had other names for the Circassians (such as Georgian: ჯიქი, Jiqi), but with Russian influence, the name has been settled as Cherkess. It is the same or similar in many world languages that cite these languages.

The Encyclopaedia Islamica adds: "The Cherkess: the Kabardians and the western Adyghe people share a common language, which is spoken by the north-western Caucasian people, and belongs to the family known as Abkhazian-Adyghe".

In Medieval Oriental and European texts, the Adyghe people were known by the name Cherkess/Circassians. In Persian sources, Charkas/Cherkes is used to refer to the "actual" Circassians of the northwest Caucasus, and in some occasions as a general designation for Caucasians who live beyond Derbent (Darband).

=== Soviet policy ===
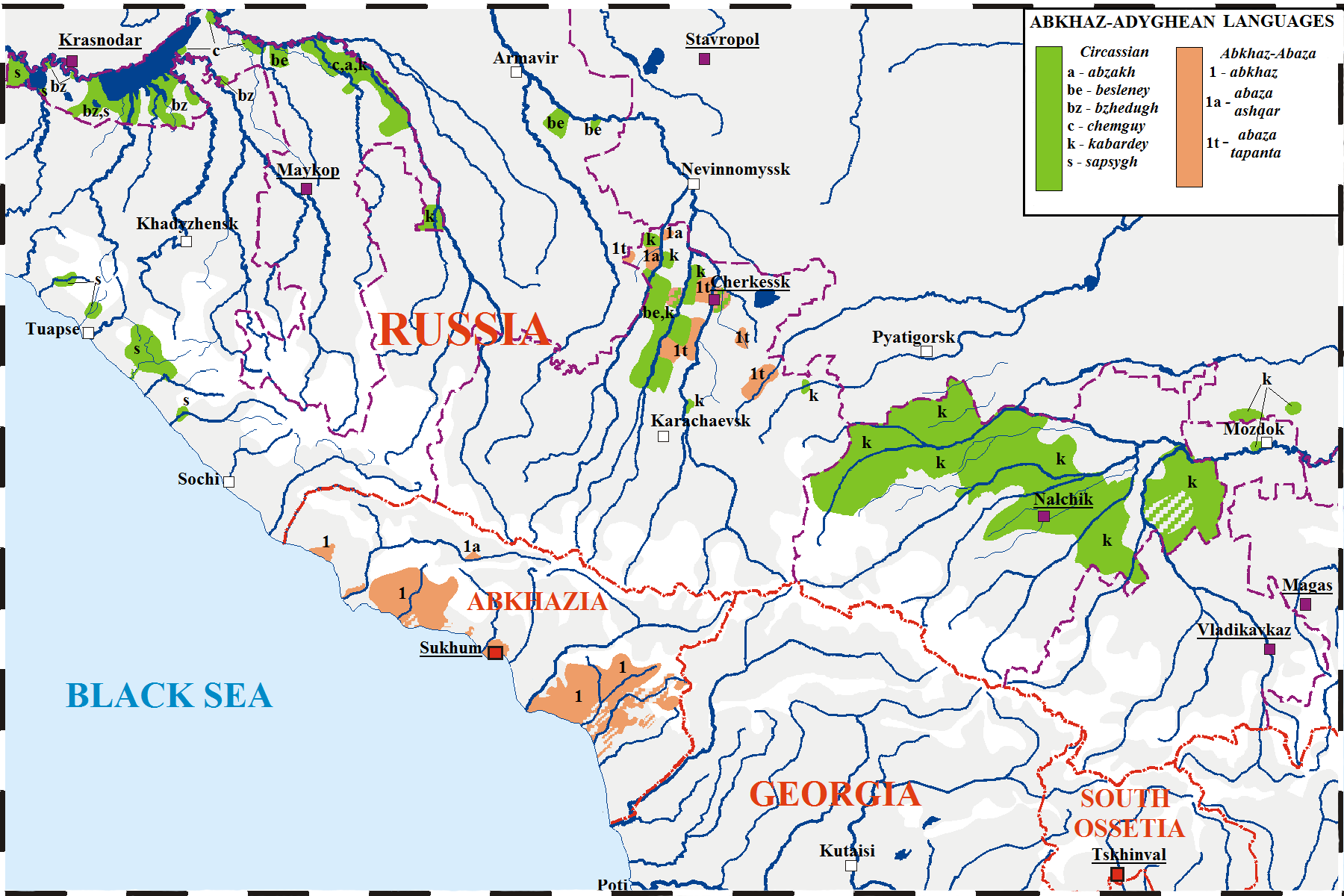
Remaining Circassian populations in historic Circassia, 21st century

Despite a common self-designation and a common Russian name, Soviet authorities divided the nation into four different peoples and applied four designations to Circassians remaining in the historic lands of Circassia:

- Kabardian, Circassians of Kabardino-Balkaria (Circassians speaking the Kabardian language, one of two indigenous peoples of the republic)
- Cherkess (Adyghe: Шэрджэс), Circassians of Karachay-Cherkessia (Circassians speaking the Cherkess, i.e. Circassian, language, one of two indigenous peoples of the republic who are mostly Besleney Kabardians. The name "Cherkess" is the Russian form of "Circassian" and was used for all Circassians before Soviet times.)
- Shapsug, the indigenous historical inhabitants of Shapsugia. They live in the Tuapse District and the Lazarevsky City District (formerly the Shapsug national district) of Sochi, both in Krasnodar Krai and in Adygea.

== History ==
=== Origins ===
Genetically, the Adyghe have shared ancestry partially with neighboring peoples of the Caucasus, with some influence from other regions. The most prevalent SNP haplotype among all Circassian tribes is G2-YY1215 (43%); others are R1a-M198* (13%), G2-YY9632 (9%), and J2-M172* (7%), sharing a single common ancestor 3,000 years ago, with the largest demographic growth between 2,000 and 1,500 years ago. Prevalence of the G2-YY1215 haplogroup is higher in the Western Caucasus and decreases to the east, while G2-YY9632 has the opposite tendency. R1a-M198* is shared with Balkars, Karachays and Kuban Cossacks.

The Circassian language, also known as Cherkess, is in the Northwest Caucasian language family. Archaeological findings, mainly of dolmens in the northwest Caucasus region, indicate a megalithic culture.

The ancestors of present-day Circassians are known as the Sinti-Maeotian tribes. Archaeological research shows that these tribes were the indigenous people of the Caucasus. Some researchers have claimed there may be links between Circassians and Indo-European-speaking communities, and some have argued that there are connections between Circassians and Hatti, who are from ancient Anatolian peoples, but these theories are not widely accepted. According to genetic tests performed on Circassians, their closest relatives are Ingush, Chechens, Georgians and Abkhazians.

==== Pseudoscientific claims ====
Turkish nationalist groups and proponents of modern-day Pan-Turkism have claimed that the Circassians are of Turkic origin, but no scientific evidence supports this claim, and it has been strongly denied by ethnic Circassians, impartial research, linguists, and historians around the world. The Circassian language does not share notable similarities to the Turkish language, except for borrowed words. According to various historians, the Circassian origin of the Sind-Meot tribes refutes the claim that the Circassians are of Turkic ethnic origin.

German racial theorists, after comparing skull shapes, declared that Europeans, North Africans, and Caucasians were of a common race, termed "Caucasian" or later "Caucasoid". Scientific racism emphasized the so-called "superior beauty" of the Circassian people, referring to them as "how God intended the human race to be", leading to the 18th century stereotype of the Circassian beauty.

=== Medieval period ===
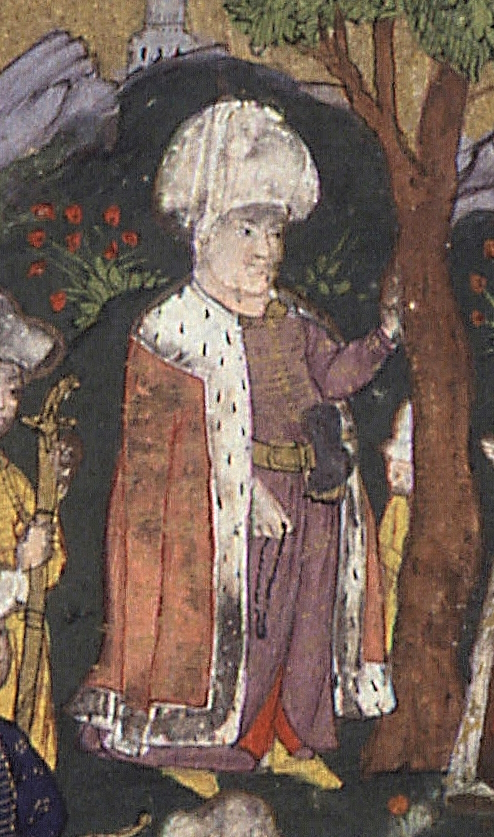
Hadim Yusuf Pasha, Ottoman Governor of Baghdad in 1605-1606, a Circassian by birth and a eunuch. Sefernāme of Muhlisi (BNF, Turc 127).

Feudalism began to emerge among Circassians by the 4th century. As a result of Armenian, Greek, and Byzantine influence, Christianity spread throughout the Caucasus between the 3rd and 5th centuries. During that period, Circassians (known at the time as Kassogs) began to accept Christianity as a national religion, but did not abandon all elements of their indigenous religious beliefs. Circassians established many states, but could not achieve political unity. From around 400, wave after wave of outsiders began to invade the lands of the Adyghe people, who were also known as the Kasogi (or Kassogs) at the time. They were conquered first by the Bulgars (who originated on the Central Asian steppes). Outsiders sometimes confused the Adyghe people with the similarly named Utigurs (a branch of the Bulgars). After the Khazar state dissolved, the Adyghe people were integrated around the end of the 1st millennium AD into the Kingdom of Alania. Between the 10th and 13th centuries, Georgia had influence on the Adyghe Circassian peoples. In the medieval era, there was a Circassian kingdom called Zichia (Adyghe: Адзыгъэй; Greek: Ζιχία) or Zekchia.

In 1382, Circassian slaves took the Mamluk throne, the Burji dynasty took over and the Mamluks became a Circassian state. The Mongols, who started invading the Caucasus in 1223, destroyed some of the Circassians and most of the Alans. The Circassians lost most of their lands during the ensuing Golden Horde attacks and had to retreat to the back of the Kuban River. In 1395, Circassians fought violent wars against Tamerlane, and although they won the wars, Tamerlane plundered Circassia.

Prince Inal, who owned land in the Taman peninsula during the 1400s, established an army and declared that his goal was to unite the Circassians under a single state. They were divided into many states at that time, but after declaring his own princedom, Inal conquered all of Circassia one by one. Circassian nobles and princes tried to prevent Inal's rise, but Inal and his supporters defeated 30 Circassian lords. After successfully uniting the Circassians, Inal still wanted to include the closely related Abkhazians. Inal, who won the war in Abkhazia, officially conquered Northern Abkhazia and the Abkhaz people recognized his rule. One of the stars on the flag of Abkhazia represents Inal. He divided his lands between his sons and grandchildren in 1453 and died in 1458. After that, Circassian tribal principalities were established, including Chemguy, founded by Temruk; Besleney, founded by Beslan; Kabardia, founded by Qabard; and Shapsug, founded by Zanoko.

=== Early modern period ===
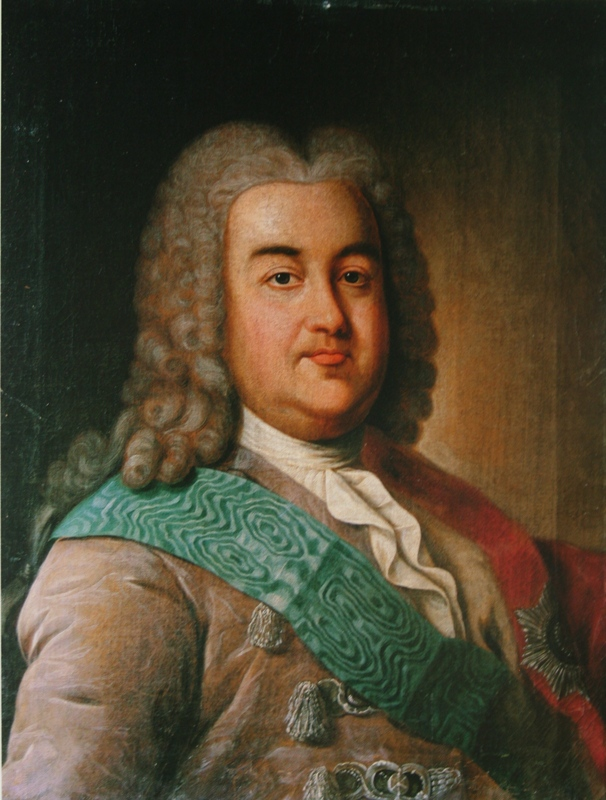
Alexey Cherkassky was the Chancellor of the Russian Empire, descended from the sovereign rulers of Circassia

In the 17th century, under the influence of the Crimean Tatars and of the Ottoman Empire, large numbers of Circassians converted to Islam from Christianity.

In 1708, Circassians paid tribute to the Ottoman sultan in order to prevent Tatar raids, but the sultan did not fulfill the obligation and the Tatars raided all the way to the center of Circassia, robbing everything they could. For this reason, Kabardian Circassians announced that they would never pay tribute to the Crimean Khan and the Ottoman Sultan again. The Ottomans sent their army of at least 20,000 men to Kabardia under the leadership of the Crimean Khan Kaplan-Girey to conquer the Circassians and ordered that he collect the tribute. The Ottomans expected an easy victory against the Kabardinians, but the Circassians won owing to the strategy set up by Kazaniko Jabagh during the battle of Kanzhal.

The Crimean army was destroyed on 17 September 1708. The Crimean Khan Qaplan I Giray barely managed to save his life, and was humiliated, all the way to his shoes taken, leaving his brother, son, field tools, tents and personal belongings. In 2013, the Institute of Russian History of the Russian Academy of Sciences recognized that the Battle of Kinzhal Mountain was of paramount importance in the national history of Circassians, Balkarians and Ossetians.

=== Circassian Genocide ===
In 1714, Peter I established a plan to occupy the Caucasus. Although he was unable to implement this plan, he laid the political and ideological foundation for the occupation to take place. Catherine II began implementing this plan into action. The Russian army was deployed on the banks of the Terek River.

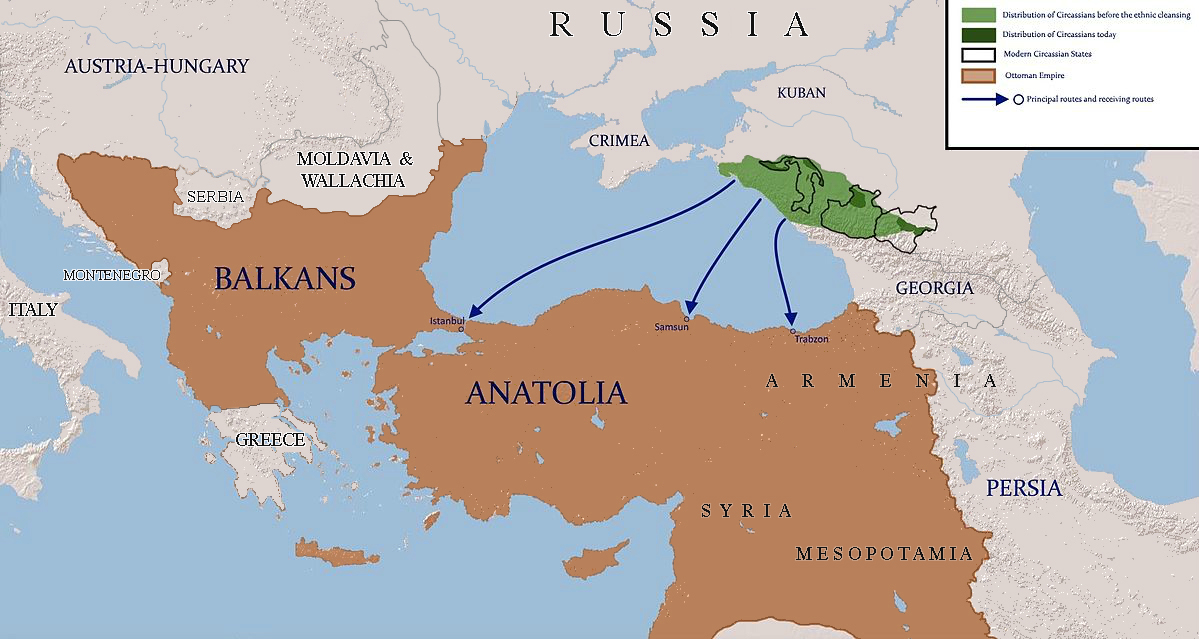
A map of the expulsion of Circassians to the Ottoman Empire. The light-green area denotes the final borders of Circassians, who had already been pushed southwards prior to their expulsion to the Ottoman Empire. In the late 18th century, Circassians lost their northern territories, which do not appear in green on this map.

The Russian military initially tried to impose their authority by building a series of forts, but these forts in turn became the new targets of raids, and indeed sometimes the highlanders actually captured and held the forts. Under Yermolov, the Russian military began using a strategy of disproportionate retribution for raids. Russian troops retaliated by destroying villages where resistance fighters were thought to hide, as well as employing assassinations, kidnappings, and executions of whole families. Because the resistance was relying on sympathetic villages for food, the Russian military also systematically destroyed crops and livestock and killed Circassian civilians. Circassians responded by creating a tribal federation encompassing all tribes of the area. In 1840, Karl Friedrich Neumann estimated the Circassian casualties at around one and a half million. Some sources state that hundreds of thousands of others died during the exodus. Several historians use the phrase "Circassian massacres" for the consequences of Russian actions in the region.

In a series of sweeping military campaigns lasting from 1860 to 1864... the northwest Caucasus and the Black Sea coast were virtually emptied of Muslim villagers. Columns of the displaced were marched either to the Kuban [River] plains or toward the coast for transport to the Ottoman Empire... One after another, entire Circassian tribal groups were dispersed, resettled, or killed en masse.

Circassians established an assembly called "Great Freedom Assembly" in the capital city of Shashe (Sochi) on 25 June 1861. Haji Qerandiqo Berzedj was appointed as the head of the assembly. This assembly asked for help from Europe, arguing that they would be forced into exile soon. However, before the result was achieved, Russian General Kolyobakin invaded Sochi and destroyed the parliament, and no country opposed this.

In May 1864, a final battle took place between the Circassian army of 20,000 Circassian horsemen and a fully equipped Russian army of 100,000 men. Circassian warriors attacked the Russian army and tried to break through the line, but most were shot down by Russian artillery and infantry. The remaining fighters continued to fight as guerillas and were soon defeated. All 20,000 Circassian horsemen died in the war. The war ended officially on 21 May 1864. The place where this war took place is known today as Krasnaya Polyana. "Krasnaya Polyana" means red meadow. It takes its name from the Circassian blood flowing from the hill into the river.

The proposal to deport the Circassians was ratified by the Russian government, and a flood of refugee movements began as Russian troops advanced in their final campaign. Circassians prepared to resist and hold their last stand against Russian military advances and troops. With the refusal to surrender, Circassian civilians were targeted one by one by the Russian military with thousands massacred and the Russians started to raid and burn Circassian villages, destroy the fields to make it impossible to return, cut trees down, and drive the people towards the Black Sea coast.

Although it is not known exactly how many people are affected, researchers have suggested that at least 75%, 90%, 94%, or 95–97% of the ethnic Circassian population are affected. Considering these rates, calculations including those taking into account the Russian government's own archival figures, have estimated a loss 600,000–1,500,000. Ivan Drozdov, a Russian officer who witnessed the scene at Qbaada in May 1864 as the other Russians were celebrating their victory remarked:

On the road, our eyes were met with a staggering image: corpses of women, children, elderly persons, torn to pieces and half-eaten by dogs; deportees emaciated by hunger and disease, almost too weak to move their legs, collapsing from exhaustion and becoming prey to dogs while still alive.

— Drozdov, Ivan. "Posledniaia Bor'ba s Gortsami na Zapadnom Kavkaze". Pages 456–457.

The Ottoman Empire regarded the Adyghe warriors as courageous and well-experienced. It encouraged them to settle in various near-border settlements of the Ottoman Empire in order to strengthen the empire's borders.

According to Walter Richmond,

Circassia was a small independent nation on the northeastern shore of the Black Sea. For no reason other than ethnic hatred, over the course of hundreds of raids the Russians drove the Circassians from their homeland and deported them to the Ottoman Empire. At least 600,000 people lost their lives to massacre, starvation, and the elements while hundreds of thousands more were forced to leave their homeland. By 1864, three-fourths of the population was annihilated, and the Circassians had become one of the first stateless peoples in modern history.

As of 2025, Georgia and Ukraine are the only countries to classify the events as genocide.

=== Post-exile period ===
As early as 1859, the Russian government had sought potential avenues for expelling the native Circassian population, and found a solution in the Ottoman Empire. Despite their numerous historical and ongoing disputes, the two empires negotiated on the impending migrations and resettlements. The Russians promised a gradual process that would see the Ottomans ultimately receive fewer than 100,000 Circassians. The Circassians would first be moved, or coerced to move, to the Circassian Black Sea coast, from which Ottoman boats would take them to designated ports in Anatolia. The recently formed Ottoman Muhacirin Komisyonu, or Emigrant Commission, would coordinate both the retrieval and resettlement of the Circassians throughout the Ottoman Empire. The process of expulsion had already begun even before the end of the Russo-Circassian war; the first Circassians had begun to arrive in small numbers as early as 1859, mainly consisting of wealthier aristocrats.

Even prior to the end of the Russo-Circassian War, expelled Circassians had begun to crowd the Circassian coast in far greater numbers than the Ottomans had anticipated, easily reaching tens of thousands at a time. Conditions on the beaches were dismal, as those waiting for Ottoman-chartered ships contended with insufficient supplies of food and shelter, occasional raids from Russian soldiers, and outbreaks of typhus and smallpox that were only exacerbated by the cramped and unsanitary conditions. By 1864, hundreds of thousands of Circassians had either already entered the Ottoman Empire or still languished on the Circassian coast awaiting transit, even as far greater numbers arrived following the Russo-Circassian War's conclusion. What was intended to be an orderly, gradual expulsion quickly eroded over the following months, as the Ottomans overcrowded boats and neglected previously enforced safety regulations. Numerous boats sank, unable to safely accommodate these larger loads, while the overcrowded conditions helped disease spread even further among both the Circassian migrants and the Ottoman crews.

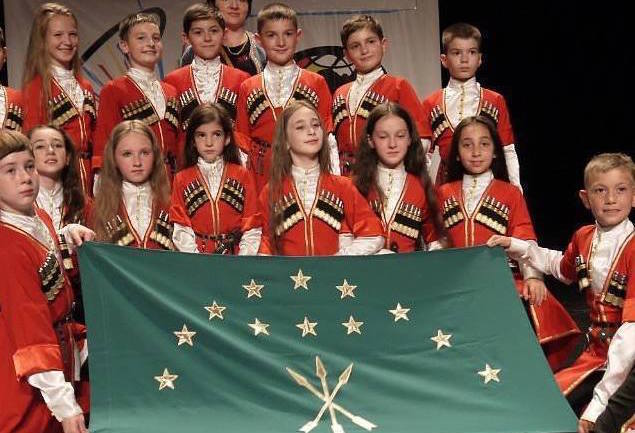
Circassian children from Maykop, Adygea, with the Circassian flag, 2014

Upon their arrival, the Emigrant Commission attempted to relocate most of the new arrivals as quickly as possible to alleviate the strain on Ottoman port cities, and began to settle the Circassians throughout the Ottoman Empire. The exiled Circassians were resettled in the Empire's remaining Balkan territories, in Ottoman Syria and Transjordan, and Anatolia, while a smaller number were resettled into the Empire's major cities.

In January 1922, the Soviet government created an autonomous oblast which was the predecessor of the Karachay-Cherkess Republic.

The actions of the Russian military in acquiring Circassian land through expulsion and massacres have given rise to a movement among descendants of the expelled ethnicities for international recognition of the perpetration of genocide. On 20 May 2011, the Georgian parliament voted in a 95 to 0 declaration that Russia had committed genocide when it engaged in massacres against Circassians in the 19th century.

=== Sochi Olympics controversy ===
The 2014 Winter Olympics facilities in Sochi (once the Circassian capital) were built in areas that were claimed to contain mass graves of Circassians who were killed during genocide by Russia in military campaigns lasting from 1860 to 1864.

Adyghe organizations in Russia and the Adyghe diaspora around the world requested that construction at the site stop and that the Olympic Games not be held at the site of the Adyghe genocide, to prevent desecration of Adyghe graves. According to Iyad Youghar, who headed the lobby group International Circassian Council: "We want the athletes to know that if they compete here they will be skiing on the bones of our relatives." The year 2014 also marked the 150th anniversary of the Circassian Genocide which angered the Circassians around the world. Many protests were held all over the world to stop the Sochi Olympics, but they were not successful.

== Culture ==
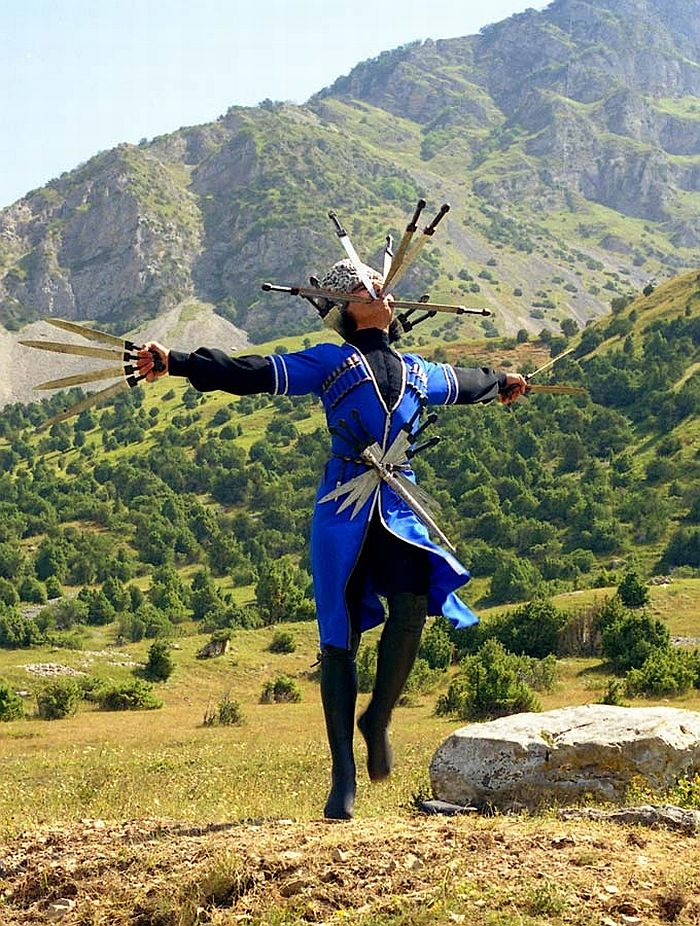
Circassian traditional sword dance

Adyghe society prior to the Russian invasion was highly stratified. While a few tribes in the mountainous regions of Adygeya were fairly egalitarian, most were broken into strict castes. The highest was the caste of the "princes", followed by a caste of lesser nobility, and then commoners, serfs, and slaves. In the decades before Russian rule, two tribes overthrew their traditional rulers and set up democratic processes, but this social experiment was cut short by the end of Adyghe independence.

=== Language ===
Yinal speaking Adyghe and Kabardian.

- Proto‑Circassian
  - East Circassian
    - Kabardian
    - Besleney
  - West Circassian
    - Kuban river
      - Chemguy
      - Abzakh
      - Bzhedugh
    - Black Sea coast
      - Shapsug
      - Natukhaj

A Circassian dialects family tree.

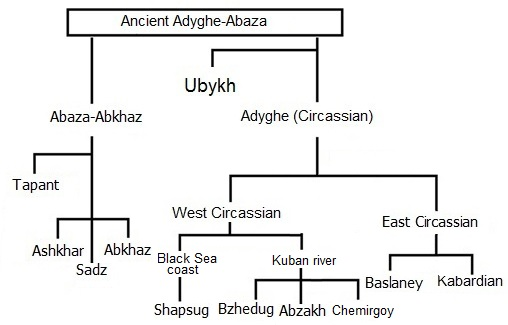
The isolated Northwest Caucasian language family

Circassians mainly speak the Circassian languages, two mutually intelligible languages of the Northwest Caucasian language family, namely Adyghe (West Circassian) and Kabardian (East Adyghe). Adyghe is based on Temirgoy (Chemirgoy) dialect, while Kabardian is based on the dialect of the same name. Circassians also speak Russian, Turkish, English, Arabic, and Hebrew in large numbers, having been exiled by Russia to lands of the Ottoman Empire, where the majority of them live today, and some to neighboring Persia, to which they came primarily through mass deportations by the Safavids and Qajars or, to a lesser extent, as muhajirs in the 19th century.

Linguists divide the Northwest Caucasian languages into three branches, namely Circassian (Adyghe and Kabardian), Ubykh (consisting only of the Ubykh language, which is considered to have diverged from the Circassian languages and is now a dead language), and Abazgi (Abkhaz and Abaza). The Ubykhs lived on the Black Sea coast, around the city of Sochi, the capital of Circassia, north of Abkhazia.

Although related, Abazgi and Circassian are mutually unintelligible. Abazgi is spoken by Abkhazians and the Abazins. The Abkhazians lived on the coast between the Circassians and the Georgians, were organized as the Principality of Abkhazia and were involved with the Georgians to some degree. The Abazins or Abaza, their relatives, lived north of the mountains and were involved with Circassia proper. They extended from the mountain crest northeast onto the steppe and partially separated the Kabardians from the rest. Sadz were either northern Abkhazian or eastern Abaza, depending on the source.

Walter Richmond writes that the Circassian languages in Russia are "gravely threatened." He argues that Russian policy of surrounding small Circassian communities with Slavic populations has created conditions where Circassian languages and nationality will disappear. By the 1990s, Russian had become the standard language for business in the Republic of Adygea, even within communities with Circassian majority populations.

=== Religion ===
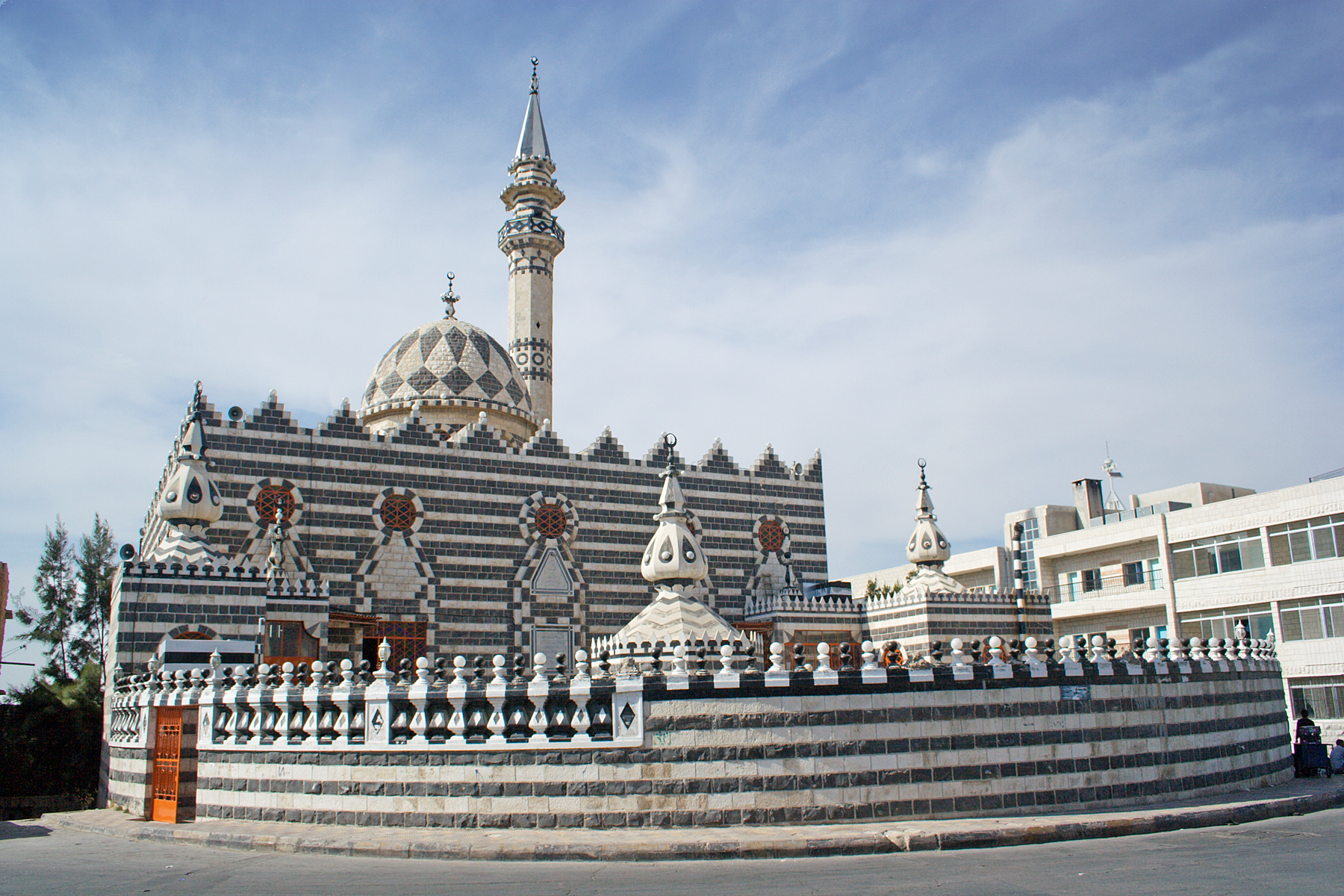
The mosque of Abu Darwish (a descendant of Adyghes), one of the oldest mosques in Amman, Jordan, and considered a major landmark.

Before conversion to Islam, the Adyghe people had gradually abandoned their ancient polytheist beliefs for Christianity.

It is the tradition of the early church that Christianity made its first appearance in Circassia in the first century AD via the travels and preaching of the Apostle Andrew. Subsequently, Christianity spread throughout the Caucasus between the fourth and sixth centuries.

A small Muslim presence in Circassia has existed since the Middle Ages, but widespread Islamization occurred after 1717, when Sultan Ahmed III ordered the Crimean Khans to spread Islam among the Circassians, with the Ottomans and Crimeans seeing some success in converting members of the aristocracy who would then ultimately spread the religion to their dependents. Moreover, the ever increasing threat of an invasion from Russia helped expedite the already centuries long process of gradual islamization of the region.

Significant Christian and pagan presence remained among some tribes such as the Shapsugs and Natukhai with Islamization pressures implemented by those loyal to the Caucasus Imamate. Sufi orders including the Qadiri and Nakshbandi orders gained prominence and played a role in spreading Islam.

Today, the vast majority of Circassians are Muslim, and significantly fewer are Habze, atheists, or Christians. Among Christians, Catholicism, originally introduced along the coasts by Venetian and Genoese traders, today constitutes just under 1% of Kabardins, notably including those in Mozdok and some of those Kursky district. Among Muslims, Islamic observance varies widely between those who only know a few prayers with a Muslim identity that is more "cultural" than religious, to those who regularly observe all requirements.

Today, both Islam and the Habze are identified as national characteristics, even by those who do not practice either religion. Today, Islam is a central part of life in many Circassian diaspora communities, such as in Israel, while in the Circassian homeland Soviet rule saw an extensive process of secularization, and there is wide influence of many social norms which contradict Islamic law, such as widespread norms like social alcohol consumption; in Israel, meanwhile, such non-Islamic social norms are not present.

In the modern times, it has been reported that they identify primarily as Muslims. There have also been reports of violence and threats against those "reviving" and diffusing the original Circassian pre-Islamic faith. The relationship between habze and Islam varies between Circassian communities; for some, there is conflict between the two, while for others, such as in Israel, they are seen as complementary philosophies. In 2005, a representative sample study of younger generation of Circassians aged 20–35 found that some 26% of those surveyed identified as irreligious.

=== Traditional social system ===
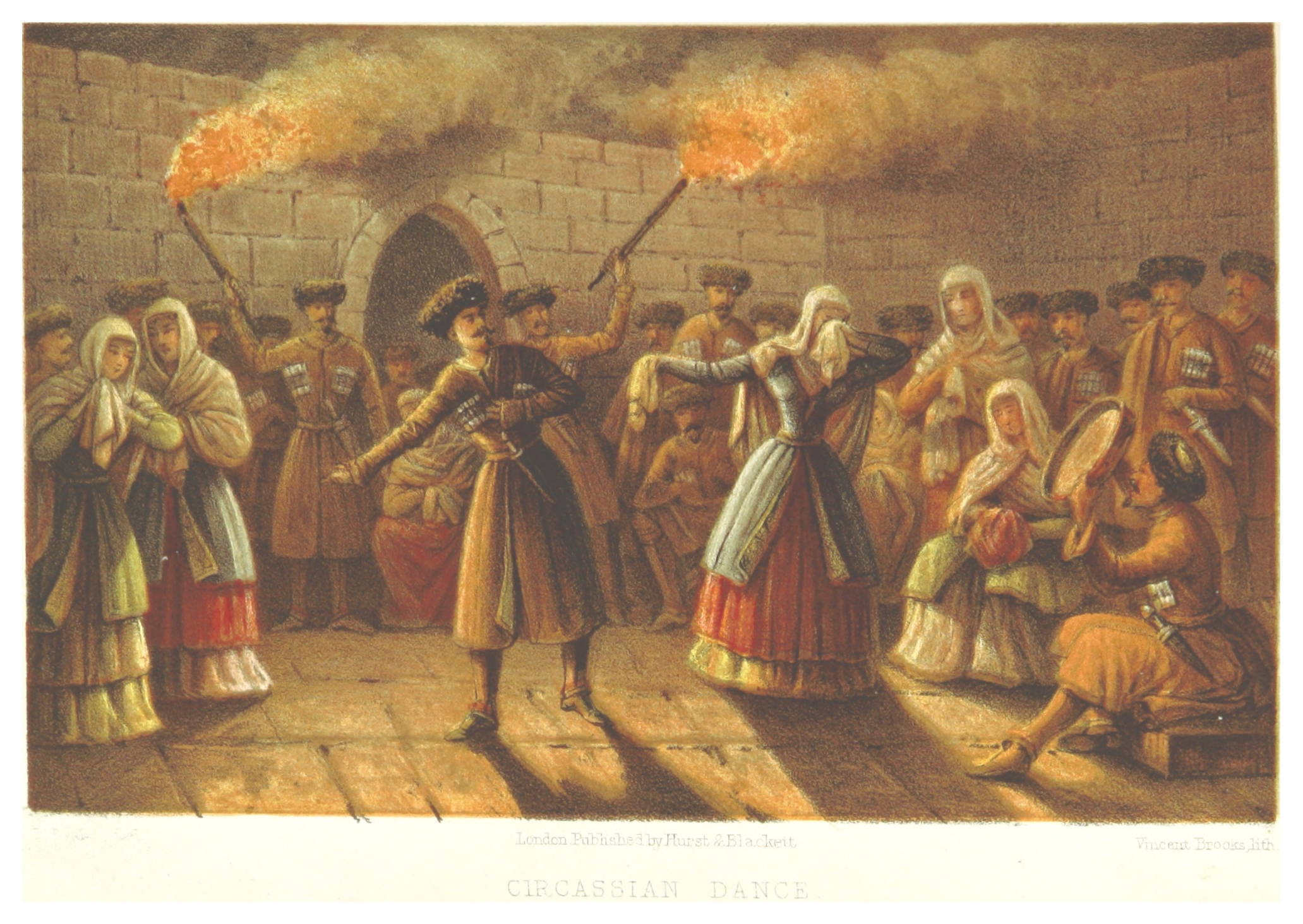
Circassian dance

Society was organized by Adyghe khabze, or Circassian custom. Many of these customs had equivalents throughout the mountains. The seemingly disorganized Circassians resisted the Russians. The aristocracy was called warq. Some aristocratic families held the rank of Pshi or prince and the eldest member of this family was the Pshi-tkhamade who was the tribal chief. Below the warq was the large class to tfokotl, roughly yeomen or freemen, who had various duties to the warq.

They were divided into clans of some sort. Below them were three classes approximating serfs or slaves. Of course, these Circassian social terms do not exactly match their European equivalents. Since everything was a matter of custom, much depended on time, place, circumstances and personality. The three 'democratic' tribes, Natukhai, Shapsug, and Abdzakh, managed their affairs by assemblies called Khase or larger ones called Zafes.

Decisions were made by general agreement and there was no formal mechanism to enforce decisions. The democratic tribes, who were perhaps the majority, lived mainly in the mountains where they were relatively protected from the Russians. They seem to have retained their aristocrats, but with diminished powers. In the remaining 'feudal' tribes power was theoretically in the hands of the Pshi-tkhamade, although his power could be limited by Khases or other influential families.

In addition to the vertical relations of class there were many horizontal relations between unrelated persons. There was a strong tradition of hospitality similar to the Greek xenia. Many houses would have a kunakskaya or guest room. The duty of a host extended even to abreks or outlaws. Two men might be sworn brothers or kunaks. There were brotherhoods of unrelated individuals called tleuzh who provided each other mutual support. It was common for a child to be raised by an atalyk or foster father. Criminal law was mainly concerned with reconciling the two parties. Adyghe khabze is sometimes called adat when it is contrasted to the kind of Islamic law advocated by people like Imam Shamil.

=== Traditional clothing ===
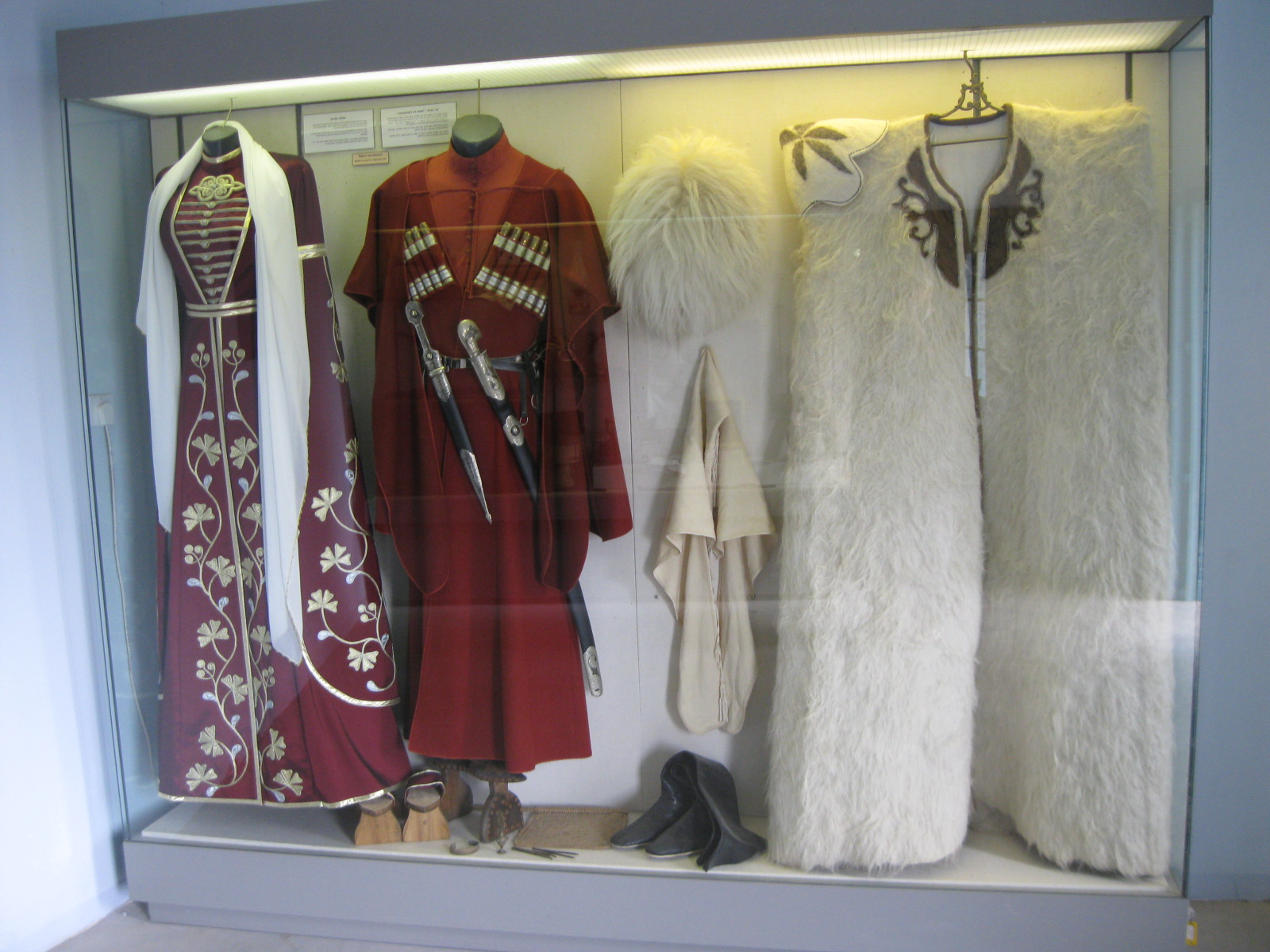
Traditional Circassian clothing

The traditional female clothing (Adyghe: Бзылъфыгъэ Шъуашэр, Bzıłfıǵe Ȿuaşer [bzəɬfəʁa ʂʷaːʃar]) was very diverse and highly decorated and mainly depends on the region, class of family, occasions, and tribes. The traditional female costume is composed of a dress (Adyghe: Джанэр, Janer [d͡ʒaːnar]), coat (Adyghe: Сае, Saye [saːja]), shirt, pant (Adyghe: ДжэнэкӀакор, Jeneç'akuer [d͡ʒanat͡ʃʼaːkʷar]), vest (Adyghe: КӀэкӀ, Ç'eç' [t͡ʃʼat͡ʃʼ]), lamb leather bra (Adyghe: Шъохътан, Ȿuex́tan [ʂʷaχtaːn]), a variety of hats (Adyghe: ПэӀохэр}, Peꜧuexer [paʔʷaxar]), shoes, and belts (Adyghe: Бгырыпхыхэр, Bğırıpxıxer [bɣərəpxəxar]).

Holiday dresses are made of expensive fabrics such as silk and velvet. The traditional colors of women's clothing rarely includes blue, green or bright-colored tones, instead mostly white, red, black and brown shades are worn. The Circassian dresses were embroidered with gold and silver threads. These embroideries were handmade and took time to complete as they were very intricate.

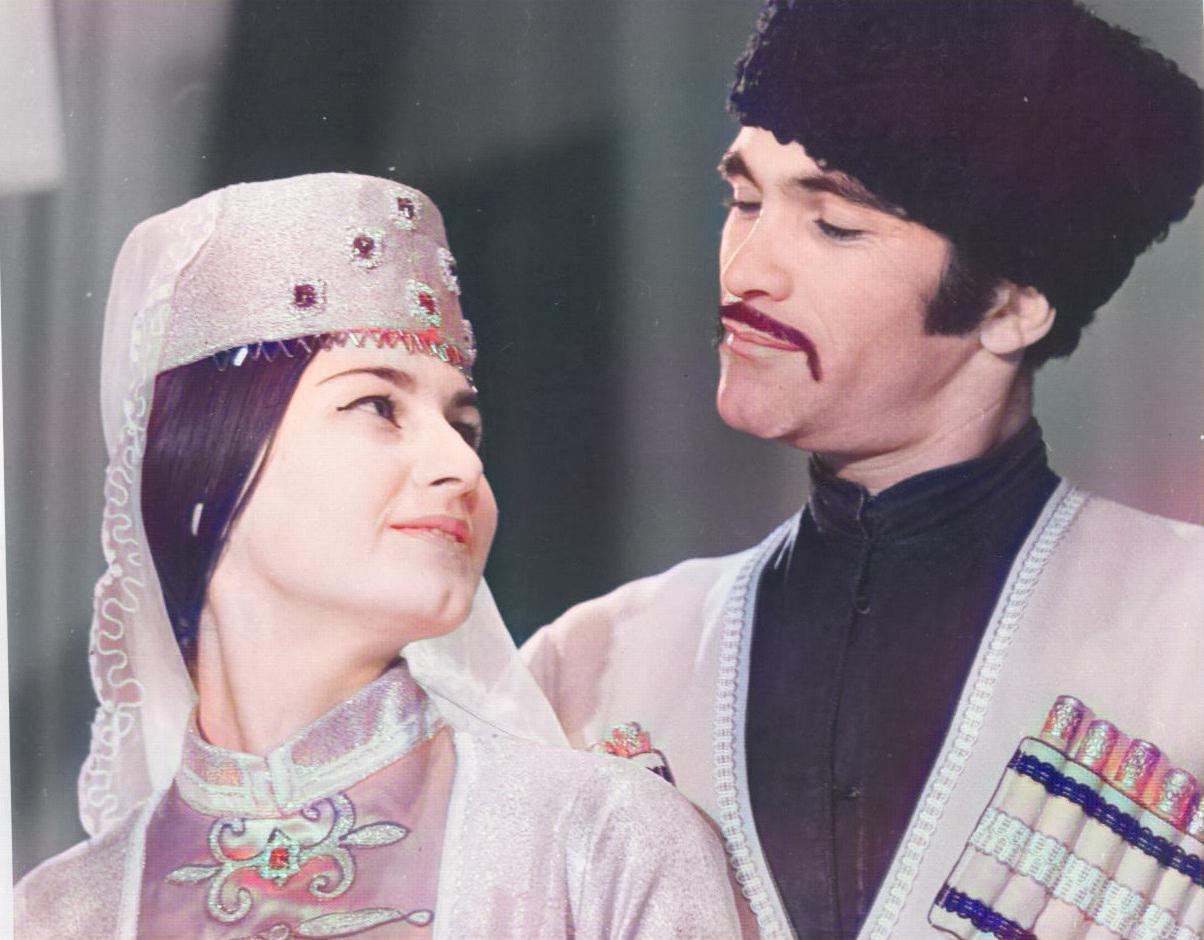
An Adyge woman and man in traditional clothing

The traditional male costume (Adyghe: Адыгэ хъулъфыгъэ шъуашэр, Adığe X́uıłfıǵe Ȿuaşer [aːdəɣa χʷəɬfəʁa ʂʷaːʃar]) includes a coat with wide sleeves, shirt, pants, a dagger, sword, and a variety of hats and shoes. Traditionally, young men in the warriors' times wore coat with short sleeves—in order to feel more comfortable in combat. Different colors of clothing for males were strictly used to distinguish between different social classes, for example white is usually worn by princes, red by nobles, gray, brown, and black by peasants (blue, green and the other colors were rarely worn).

A compulsory item in the traditional male costume is a dagger and a sword. The traditional Adyghean sword is called shashka. It is a special kind of sabre; a very sharp, single-edged, single-handed, and guardless sword. Although the sword is used by most of Russian and Ukrainian Cossacks, the typically Adyghean form of the sabre is longer than the Cossack type, and in fact the word Shashka came from the Adyghe word "Sashkhwa" (Adyghe: Сашьхъуэ, Sas̨x́ue) which means "long knife". On the breast of the costume are long ornamental tubes or sticks, once filled with a single charge of gunpowder (called gaziri cartridges) and used to reload muskets.

=== Traditional cuisine ===
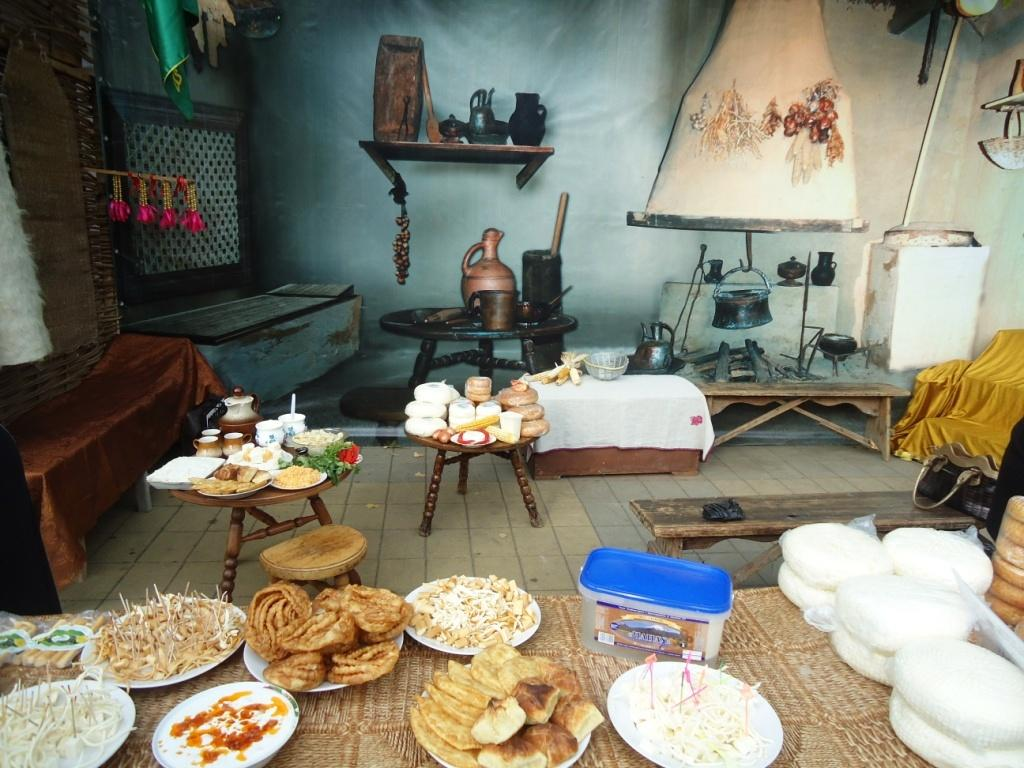
An old country house and traditional cuisine with Haliva (Хьэлжъо, Helɀwa) and Mataz (Мэтазэ, Metaze), two of the prominent traditional Adyghe snacks.

The Adyghe cuisine is rich with different dishes. In the summer, the traditional dishes consumed by the Adyghe people are mainly dairy products and vegetable dishes. In the winter and spring the traditional dishes are mainly flour and meat dishes. An example of the latter is known as ficcin.

Circassian cheese is considered one of the more famous types of cheeses in the North Caucasus.

A popular traditional dish is chicken or turkey with sauce, seasoned with crushed garlic and red pepper. Mutton and beef are served boiled, usually with a seasoning of sour milk with crushed garlic and salt.

Variants of pasta are found. A type of ravioli may be encountered, which is filled with potato or beef.

On holidays the Adyghe people traditionally make haliva (Adyghe: хьэлжъо, Helɀua) (fried triangular pastries with mainly Circassian cheese or potato), from toasted millet or wheat flour in syrup, baked cakes and pies. In the Levant there is a famous Circassian dish which is called Tajen Alsharkaseiah.

=== Traditional crafts ===
The Adyghes have been famous for making carpets (Adyghe: пӏуаблэхэр, P'uablexer [pʷʼaːblaxar]) or mats worldwide for thousands of years.

Making carpets was very hard work in which collecting raw materials is restricted to a specific period within the year. The raw materials were dried, and based on the intended colours, different methods of drying were applied. For example, when dried in the shade, its colour changed to a beautiful light gold colour. If it were dried in direct sun light then it would have a silver colour, and if they wanted to have a dark colour for the carpets, the raw materials were put in a pool of water and covered by poplar leaves (Adyghe: екӏэпцӏэ, Yeç'epc'e [jat͡ʃʼapt͡sʼa]).

The carpets were adorned with images of birds, beloved animals (horses), and plants, and the image of the Sun was widely used.

The carpets were used for different reasons due to their characteristic resistance to humidity and cold, and in retaining heat. Also, there was a tradition in Circassian homes to have two carpets hanging in the guest room, one used to hang over rifles (Adyghe: шхончымрэ, Şxuençımre [ʃxʷant͡ʃəmra]) and pistols (Adyghe: къэлаеымрэ, Qelayeımre), and the other used to hang over musical instruments.

The carpets were used to pray upon, and it was necessary for every Circassian girl to make three carpets before marriage. These carpets would give the grooms an impression as to the success of their brides in their homes after marriage.

== Tribes ==
From the late Middle Ages, a number of territorial- and political-based Circassian tribes or ethnic entities began to take shape. They had slightly different dialects.

Dialects came to exist after Circassia was divided into tribes after the death of Inal the Great, who united Circassia for the last time before its short reunion during the Russo-Caucasian War. As the logistics between the tribes became harder, each tribe became slightly isolated from one another, thus the people living under the banner of each tribe developed their own dialects. In time, the dialects they speak were named after their tribes.

At the end of the Caucasian War most Circassians were expelled to the Ottoman Empire, and many of the tribes were destroyed and the people evicted from their historical homeland in 1864.

The twelve stars on the Circassian flag symbolize the individual tribes of the Circassians; the nine stars within the arc symbolize the nine aristocratic tribes of Adygea, and the three horizontal stars symbolize the three democratic tribes. The three democratic tribes or tribes were the Natukhai, Shapsug, and Abdzakh. They managed their affairs by assemblies while the other tribes were controlled by "princes" or Pshi. The twelve tribes are the Abdzakh, Besleney, Bzhedug, Hatuqwai, Kabardian, Mamkhegh, Natukhai, Shapsug, Temirgoy, Ubykh, Yegeruqwai, and Zhaney.

Adyghe tribes with remnants still in Circassia are: Kabarda (the largest), the Temirgoy and Bzhedug in Adygea, and the Shapsug near Tuapse and to the north of Tuapsiysiy Rayon of Krasnodarskiy Kray. There are also a few Besleney and Natukhai villages, and an Abdzakh village. The majority tribes in diaspora are Kabardian, Abdzakh, and Shapsug.

Twelve Circassian (Adyghe) tribes (sub-ethnic groups)
Geographical designation	Main dialect	Tribe	Circassian name	Notes
Adygeans (Adyghe of Adygea)	Adyghe (Western Circassian)	Abzakh (Abdzakh or Abadzekh)	Абдзах, Abźax [aːbd͡zaːx]	Second largest Adyghe tribe in Turkey and the world, largest in Jordan, sixth largest in Russia
Adygeans (Adyghe of Adygea)	Adyghe (Western Circassian)	Bzhedug (Bzhedugh or Bzhedukh)	Бжъэдыгъу, Bɀedıǵu [bʐadəʁʷ]	Third largest Adyghe tribe in Russia, lesser in other countries
Adygeans (Adyghe of Adygea)	Adyghe (Western Circassian)	Hatuqwai (Hatukay or Khatukai)	Хьэтыкъуай, Hatıꝗuay [ħaːtəq͡χʷaːj]	A warlike tribe completely expelled from the Caucasus, found almost exclusively in Turkey, US, Jordan, and Israel
Adygeans (Adyghe of Adygea)	Adyghe (Western Circassian)	Mamkhegh	Мэмхэгъ, Мамхыгъ, Mamxıǵ [maːmxəʁ]	a large clan, but a small tribe
Adygeans (Adyghe of Adygea)	Adyghe (Western Circassian)	Natukhai (Notkuadj)	Натыхъуай, Netıx́uay [natəχʷaːj], Наткъуадж, Netıx́uaj [natəχʷaːd͡ʒ]	Completely expelled from the Caucasus after the Caucasian War
Adygeans (Adyghe of Adygea)	Adyghe (Western Circassian)	Temirgoy (Chemgui or Kemgui)	КIэмгуй, Ç'emguıy [t͡ʃʼamɡʷəj]	Second largest Adyghe tribe in Russia, lesser in other countries
Adygeans (Adyghe of Adygea)	Adyghe (Western Circassian)	Yegeruqwai (Yegerukay)	Еджэрыкъуай, Yejerquay [jad͡ʒarqʷaːj]	Completely expelled from the Caucasus
Adygeans (Adyghe of Adygea)	Adyghe (Western Circassian)	Zhaney (Jane or Zhan)	Жанэ, Ƶane [ʒaːna]	Not found after the Caucasian War on a tribal basis
Shapsugs (Adyghe of Krasnodar Krai)	Adyghe (Western Circassian)	Shapsug (Shapsugh)	Шэпсыгъ, Шапсыгъ, Şapsıǵ [ʃaːpsəʁ]	Third largest Adyghe tribe in Turkey and the world, largest in Israel
Ubykhians (Adyghe of Krasnodar Krai)	Ubykh (extinct) and Hakuchi Adyghe	Ubykh	Убых, Wıbıx [wəbəx], Пэху	Completely expelled from the Caucasus, found almost exclusively in Turkey where most speak East Adyghe, and some West Adyghe (often Hakuchi sub-dialect) as well as Abaza
Kabardians (Adyghe of Kabardino-Balkaria)	Kabardian (Eastern Circassian)	Kabardians (Kabardinian, Kabardin, Kabarday, Kebertei, or Adyghe of Kabarda)	Къэбэрдэй, Qeberdey [qabardaj], Къэбэртай, Qebertay [qabartaːj]	Largest Adyghe tribe in Turkey (over 2 millions), Russia (over 500,000), and the world (3–4 million), second or third largest in Jordan and Israel
Circassians (Cherkess or Adyghe of Karachay-Cherkessia)	Kabardian (Eastern Circassian)	Besleney (Beslenei)	Беслъэней, Basłınıy [basɬənəj]	

=== Other Adyghe groups ===
Small tribes or large clans that are included in one of the twelve Adyghe tribes:

Name	Circassian name	Notes
Adele (Khatuq) (Khetuk or Adali)	ХьэтIукъу, Hat'uqu	Not found after the Caucasian War on a tribal basis, included in the Abzakh and Hatuqwai tribes
Adamey (Adamei or Adamiy)	Адэмый, Ademıy [aːdaməj]	Included in the Kabardian tribe
Guaye (Goaye)	Гъоайе, Ǵuaye	Not found after the Caucasian War
Hakuchey (Hakuchi)	ХьакӀуцу [ħaːkʷʼɘt͡sʷ]	Included in the Shapsug tribe
Khegayk (Khegaik)	Хэгъуайкъу, Xeǵueyqu	Not found after the Caucasian War
Chebsin (Čöbein)	ЦIопсынэ, C'wapsıne	Not found after the Caucasian War
Makhosh (Mokhosh)	Махошъ, Mexuaȿ [maːxʷaʂ]	A large clan, but not enough to be a separate tribe

The Circassian tribes can be grouped and compared in various ways:

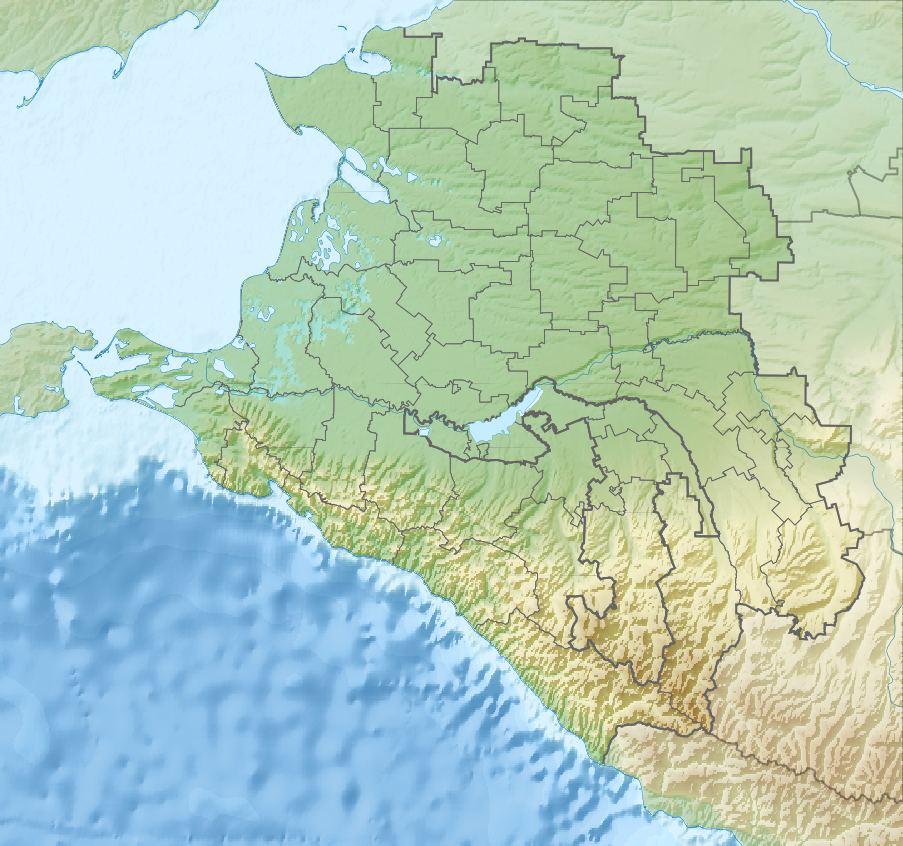
Approximate location of Circassian tribes, Tsutsiev's Atlas
- The narrow Black Sea coast was occupied, from north to south by the Natukhai, Shapsug, and Ubykh. The main part of the Natukhai and Shapsug tribes were located in the north of the mountains. The Natukhai were enriched by trade since their coast was not backed by high mountains and opened onto the steppe.
- The north slope was inhabited, from north to south, by the Natukhai, Shapsug, and Abdzakh. They seem to have been the most populous tribes after the Kabarda and its inland location gave then some protection from Nogai and Cossack raiding.
- In the far west were three small tribes that were absorbed into the Natukhai and disappeared. These were the Adele on the Taman peninsula and the Shegak and Chebsin near Anapa.
- Along the Kuban were the Natukhai, Zhaney, Bzhedug, Hatuqwai, and Temirgoy. The tribes along the Kuban and Laba rivers were exposed to Nogai and Cossack raiding than those in the interior.
- On the east, between the Laba and Belaya, from north to south, were the Temirgoy, Yegeruqwai, Makhosh, and Besleney. The Besleney were a branch of the Kabardians. Along the Belaya River were the Temirgoy, the ill-documented Ademey and then the Mamkhegh near the modern Maykop.
- The Guaye are poorly documented. The Tchelugay lived west of the Makhosh. The Hakuch lived on the coast south of the Natukhai. Other groups are mentioned without much documentation. There are reports of tribes migrating from one place to another, again without much documentation. Some sketch maps show a group of Karachays on the upper Laba without any explanation.
- In the Far east the Kabarda occupied about a third of the north Caucasus piedmont from mid Circassia proper eastward to the Chechen country. To their north were the Nogai nomads and to the south, deeper in the mountains, were from west to east, the Karachays, Balkars, Ossetians, Ingushes, and Chechens. The Kabardians were fairly advanced, interacted with the Russians from the sixteenth century and were much reduced by plague in the early nineteenth century.

== Circassian diaspora ==
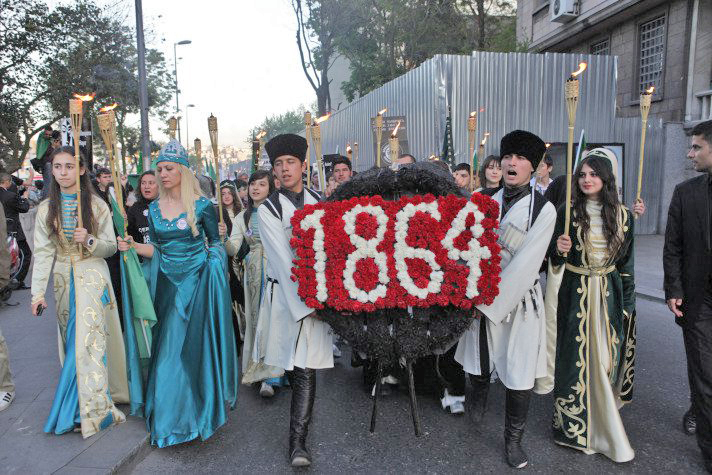
Circassians commemorate the banishment of the Circassians from Russia in Taksim, Istanbul

The Circassian people were subjected to ethnic cleansing by the Russian military during the Caucasus War and mass exile to the Ottoman Empire. In the 1860s and the 1870s, the Ottoman government settled Circassians in territories of modern-day Turkey, Syria, Jordan, Lebanon, Israel, Iraq, Georgia, Bulgaria, Romania, Serbia, Kosovo, Greece, Cyprus, and North Macedonia. Most Circassian refugees in the Balkans had fled the region during the Russo-Ottoman War of 1877–78. However, Circassians have also lived outside the Caucasus region since the Middle Ages. They were particularly well represented in the Ottoman Empire and Egypt. Since the 1860s, Circassian activists repeatedly petitioned Russian imperial, Soviet, and Russian Federation governments for the right of mass return to their homeland.

=== Turkey ===
Turkey has the largest Adyghe population in the world; around half of all Circassians live in Turkey, mainly in the provinces of Samsun and Ordu (in Northern Turkey), Kahramanmaraş (in Southern Turkey), Kayseri (in Central Turkey), Bandırma, and Düzce (in Northwest Turkey), along the shores of the Black Sea; the region near the city of Ankara. All citizens of Turkey are considered Turks by the government, but it is estimated that approximately two million ethnic Circassians live in Turkey. The "Circassians" in question do not always speak the languages of their ancestors, and in some cases some of them may describe themselves as "only Turkish". The reason for this loss of identity is mostly due to Turkey's Government assimilation policies and marriages with non-Circassians. Circassians are regarded by historians to play a key role in the history of Turkey. Many of the Young Turks were of Circassian origin. Some of the exiles and their descendants gained high positions in the Ottoman Empire. Until the end of the First World War, many Circassians actively served in the army. In the period after the First World War, Circassians came to the fore in Anatolia as a group of advanced armament and organizational abilities as a result of the struggle they fought with the Russian troops until they came to the Ottoman lands. However, the situation of the Ottoman Empire after the war caused them to be caught between the different balances of power between Istanbul and Ankara and even become a striking force. For this period, it is not possible to say that Circassians all acted together as in many other groups in Anatolia. The Turkish government removed 14 Circassian villages from Gönen and Manyas regions in December 1922, May and June 1923, without separating women and children, and drove them to different places in Anatolia from Konya to Sivas and Bitlis. This incident had a great impact on the assimilation of Circassians. After 1923, Circassians were restricted by policies such as the prohibition of Circassian language, changing village names, and surname law. Circassians were seen by the Turkish government as a group that inevitably had to be assimilated.

=== Cyprus ===
Cyprus Circassians had settled in Cyprus during the Memluk period. However these were mainly members of Memluk Army and majority of them left the island during the Venetian period. Even though, Circassians have arrived to the island during the Ottoman Empire from Caucasus by ships and they settled Limasol Circassian Farm (Cerkez Ciftlik) and villages of Larnaca; Arsos (Yiğitler), Vuda, Tremetousa (Erdemli), Paralimni in October 1864. Cypriot Circassians had joined the Turkish Cypriot Community and some of them the Greek Cypriot Community. Although they lost their original language and culture, they still view themselves as Circassian.

=== Syria ===
Circassians play a major role in the history of Syria. In Syria, they settled mainly in the Golan Heights. Prior to the Six-Day War of 1967, the Adyghe people – then estimated at 30,000 in number – were the majority group in the Golan Heights region. The most prominent settlement in the Golan was the town of Quneitra. Estimates of the total number of Circassians in Syria range from 50,000 and 100,000. In 2013, as tensions between the Baath government and the opposition forces escalated, Syrian Circassians said they were exploring returning to Circassia. Circassians from different parts of Syria, such as Damascus, have moved back to the Golan Heights, which they believed would be safer. Some refugees have been reportedly killed by shelling. Circassians have lobbied the Russian and Israeli governments to help evacuate refugees from Syria; Russia has issued some visas.

=== Israel ===
In Israel, the Adyghe initially settled in three places—in Kfar Kama, Rehaniya, and in the region of Hadera. Due to a malaria epidemic, the Adyghe eventually abandoned the settlement near Hadera. Though Sunni Muslim, Adyghe within Israel are seen as a loyal minority who serve in the Israeli armed forces.

=== Jordan ===
The Circassians had a major role in the modern history of Jordan. Circassian refugees started arriving in Ottoman Transjordan after their expulsion from the Ottoman Balkans during the Russo-Turkish War (1877–1878). Between 1878 and 1904, Circassians founded (or re-established) five sites: Amman (1878), Wadi al-Sir (1880), Jerash (1884), Na'ur (1901), and al-Rusayfa (1904). Amman was primarily a Circassian village until World War I. Amman grew rapidly thanks to Circassian agricultural labor and trade, and mercantile investment from Damascus, Nablus, and Jerusalem, made possible by the construction of the Hejaz Railway.

Over the years, various Adyghe have served in distinguished roles in the kingdom of Jordan. Adyghes have served as a prime minister (Sa'id al-Mufti), as ministers (commonly at least one minister should represent the Circassians in each cabinet), as high-ranking officers, etc., and due to their important role in the history of Jordan, Adyghe form the Hashemites' honour guard at the royal palaces. They represented Jordan in the Royal Edinburgh Military Tattoo in 2010, joining other honour guards such as the Airborne Ceremonial Unit.

=== Egypt ===
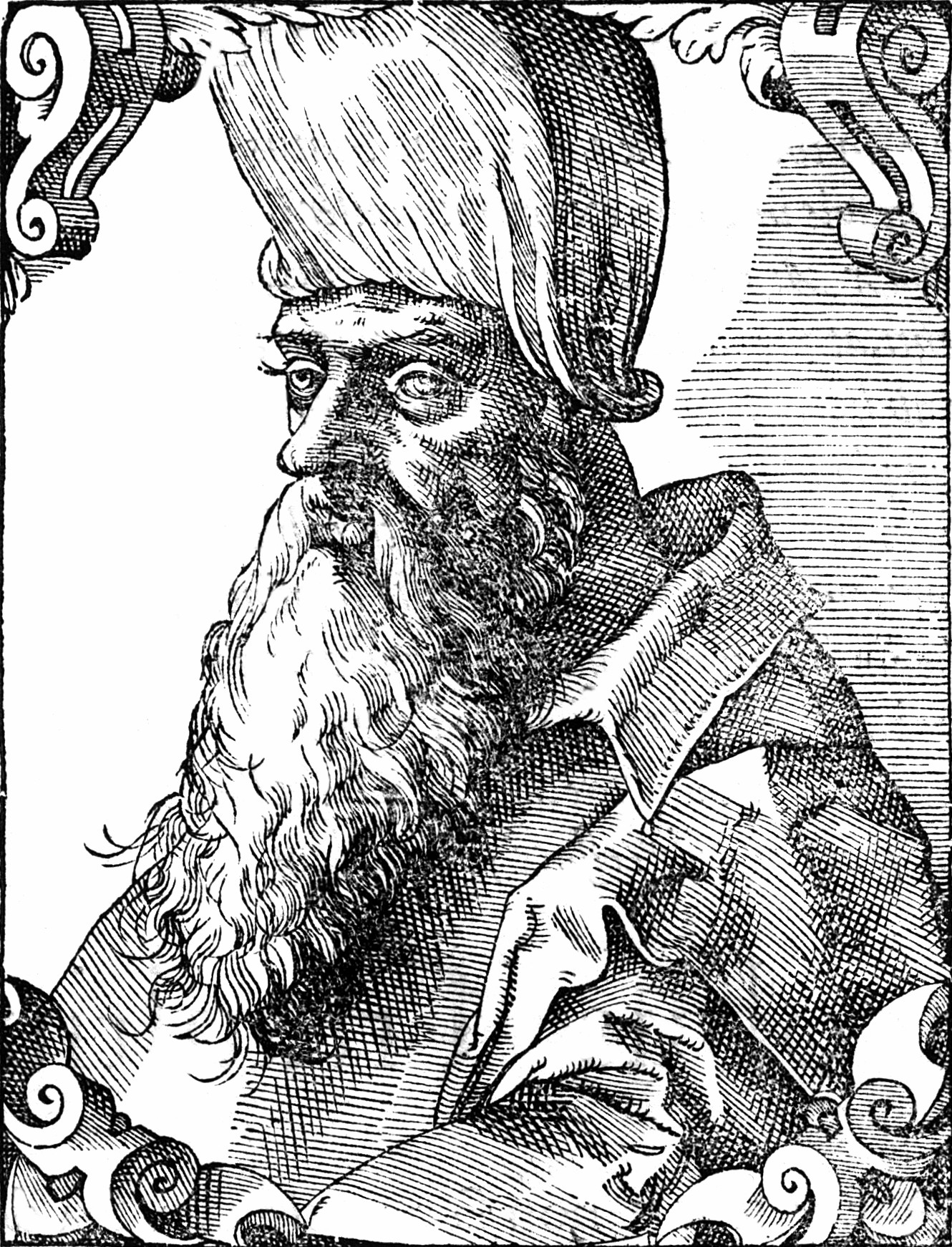
Tuman bay II (reigned 1516–1517) the last Mamluk sultan of Adyghe origins

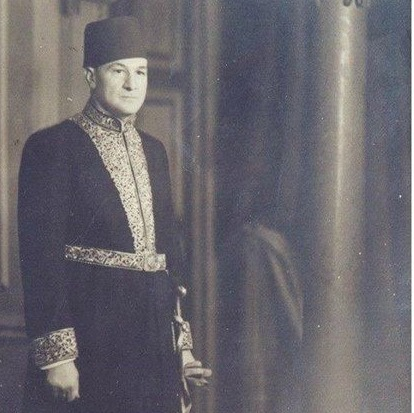
Aziz Pasha Abaza of the House of Abaza in Egypt of Abazin ancestry

During the 13th century the Mamluks seized power in Cairo. Some 15th-century Circassian converts to Islam became Mamluks and rose through the ranks of the Mamluk dynasty to high positions, some becoming sultans in Egypt such as Qaitbay, Mamluk Sultan of Egypt (1468–1496). The majority of the leaders of the Burji Mamluk dynasty in Egypt (1382–1517) had Circassian origins, while also including Abkhaz, Abaza, and Georgian peoples whom the Arab sultans had recruited to serve their kingdoms as a military force. With the rise of Muhammad Ali Pasha (who ruled Egypt from 1805 to 1848), most senior Mamluks were killed by him in order to secure his rule and the remaining Mamluks fled to Sudan. Most Circassian communities in Egypt were assimilated into the local population. As of 2016 several thousand Adyghe reside in Egypt; in addition to the descendants of Burji Mamluks of Adyghe origin, there are many who descend from royal Circassian consorts or Ottoman pashas of Circassian origin as well as Circassian muhajirs of the 19th century.

The biggest Circassian clan in Egypt is the Abaza family, the country's largest aristocratic family which settled in the Nile Delta in the 18th century. It gained prominence under the Muhammad Ali dynasty and maintained it in the contemporary republican period.

=== Iraq ===
Adyghe came to Iraq directly from Circassia. They settled in all parts of Iraq—from north to south—but most of all in Iraq's capital Baghdad. Many Adyghe also settled in Kerkuk, Diyala, Fallujah, and other places. Circassians have played major roles in different periods throughout Iraq's history, and made great contributions to political and military institutions in the country, to the Iraqi Army in particular. Several Iraqi prime ministers have been of Circassian descent.

=== Iran ===
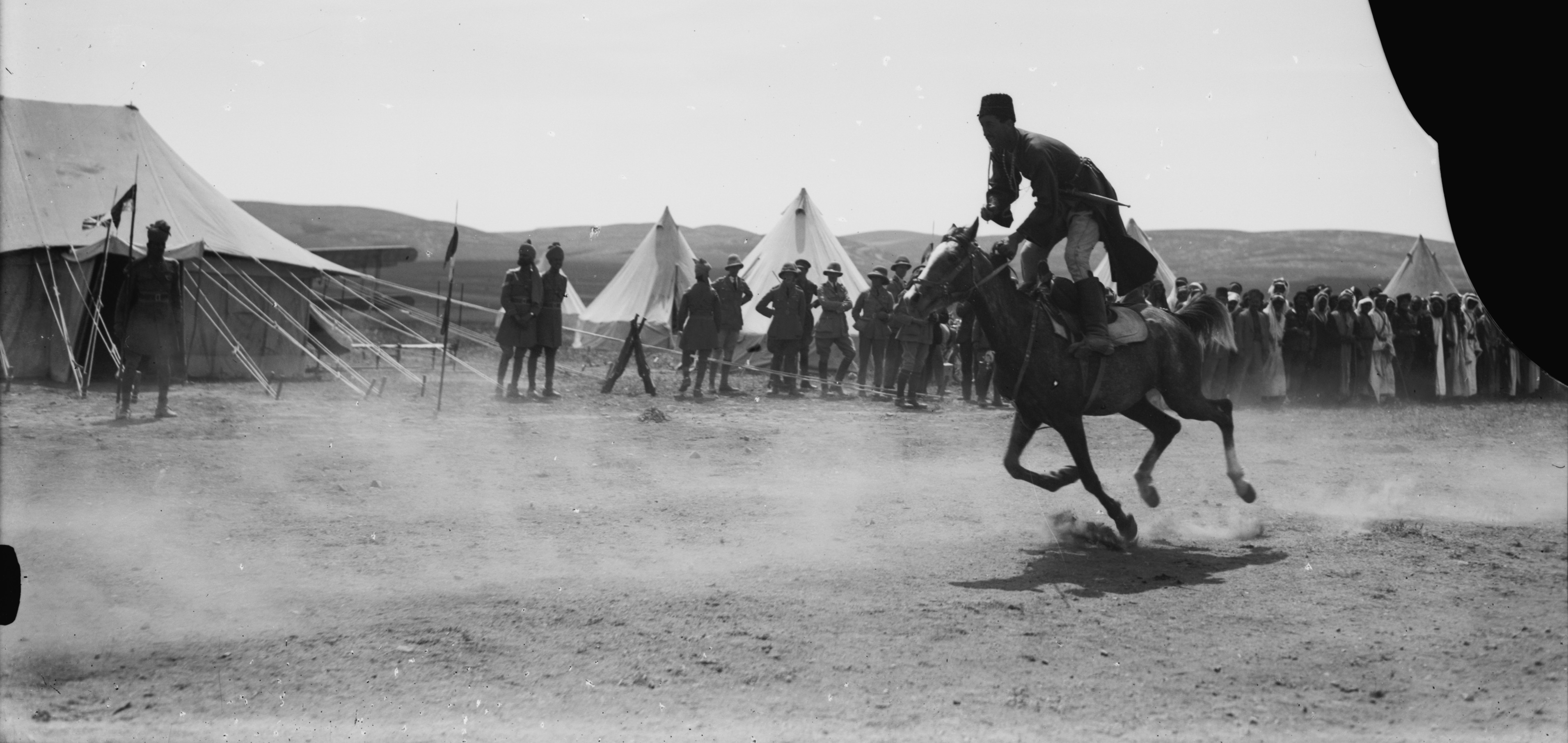
Adyghe horsemanship in Transjordan, April 1921

Iran has a significant Circassian population. It once had a very large community, but the vast majority were assimilated in the population in the course of centuries. The Safavid (1501–1736) and Qajar (1789–1925) dynasties saw the importing and deporting of large numbers of Circassians to Persia, where many enjoyed prestige in the harems and in the élite armies (the so-called ghulams), while many others settled and deployed as craftsmen, labourers, farmers and regular soldiers. Many members of the Safavid nobility and élite had Circassian ancestry and Circassian dignitaries, such as the kings Abbas II of Persia (reigned 1642–1666) and Suleiman I of Persia (reigned 1666–1694). While traces of Circassian settlements in Iran have lasted into the 20th century, many of the once large Circassian minority became assimilated into the local population.

However, significant communities of Circassians continue to live in particular cities in Iran, like Tabriz and Tehran, and in the northern provinces of Gilan and Mazandaran.

Notable places of traditional Circassian settlement in Iran include Gilan province, Fars province, Isfahan, and Tehran (due to contemporary migration). Circassians in Iran are the nation's second largest Caucasus-derived nation after the Georgians.

=== Rest of Western Asia ===
Significant communities live in Jordan, Syria (see Circassians in Syria), and smaller communities live in Israel (in the villages of Kfar Kama and Rehaniya—see Circassians in Israel). Circassians are also present in Iraq. Baghdad, Sulaymaniyah, and Diyala comprise the country's main cities with Circassians, though lesser numbers are spread in other regions and cities as well. In Cyprus, they settled in Tserkezoi and Tsiflikoudia, near Limassol.

=== Rest of Europe ===
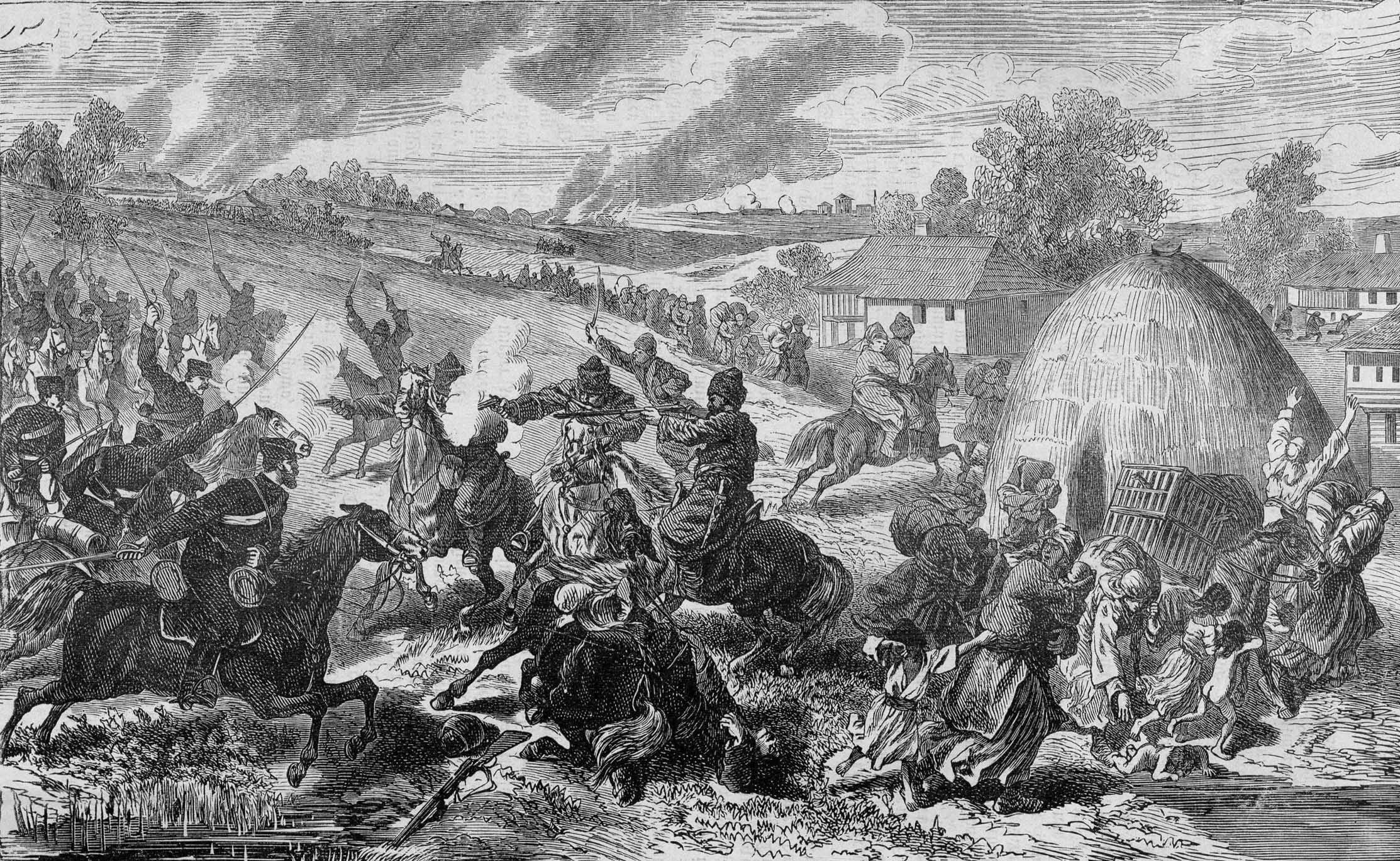
Serbian troops clashing with Circassians during the Serbian-Turkish War, 1876–1878

Out of 1,010 Circassians living in Ukraine (473 Kabardian Adyghe (Kabardin), 338 Adygean Adyghe, and 190 Cherkessian Adyghe (Cherkess)—after the existing Soviet division of Circassians into three groups), only 181 (17.9%) declared fluency in the native language; 96 (9.5%) declared Ukrainian as their native language, and 697 (69%) marked "other language" as being their native language. The major Adyghe community in Ukraine is in Odesa.

There is a small community of Circassians in Serbia, Bosnia and Herzegovina (where the surname "Čerkez" exists) and North Macedonia. A number of Adyghe also settled in modern Bulgaria and in Northern Dobruja, which now belongs to Romania (see Circassians in Romania, in 1864–1865, but most fled after those areas became separated from the Ottoman Empire in 1878. The small part of the community that settled in Kosovo (the Kosovo Adyghes) moved to the Republic of Adygea in 1998, after reprisals from the Serbian occupation forces intensified. The majority of the community, however, remained in Kosovo where they have been well established and integrated into Kosovan society. Many members of this community can be identified as they carry the family name "Çerkezi", or "Qerkezi". This community is also well established in the Republic of North Macedonia, usually mingling with the Albanian Muslim population. Circassians can be found also in Albania but totally assimilated. The surname "Çerkezi" or "Çekrezi" is carried by this families.

There are Circassians in Germany and a small number in the Netherlands.

=== North America ===
Numerous Circassians have also immigrated to the United States and settled in Upstate New York, California, and New Jersey. There is also a small Circassian community in Canada.

== Depictions in art ==
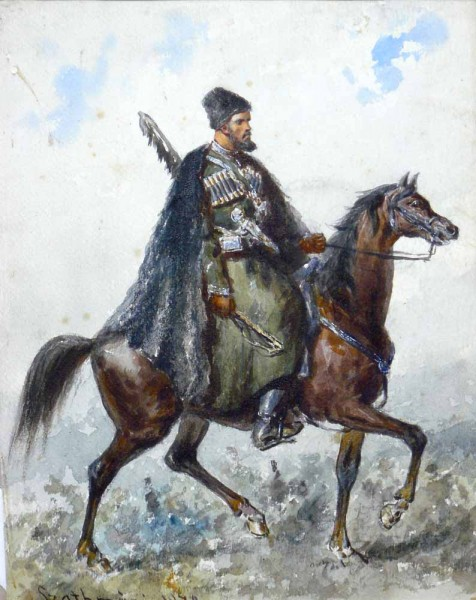
A Circassian sipahi in the Ottoman Army

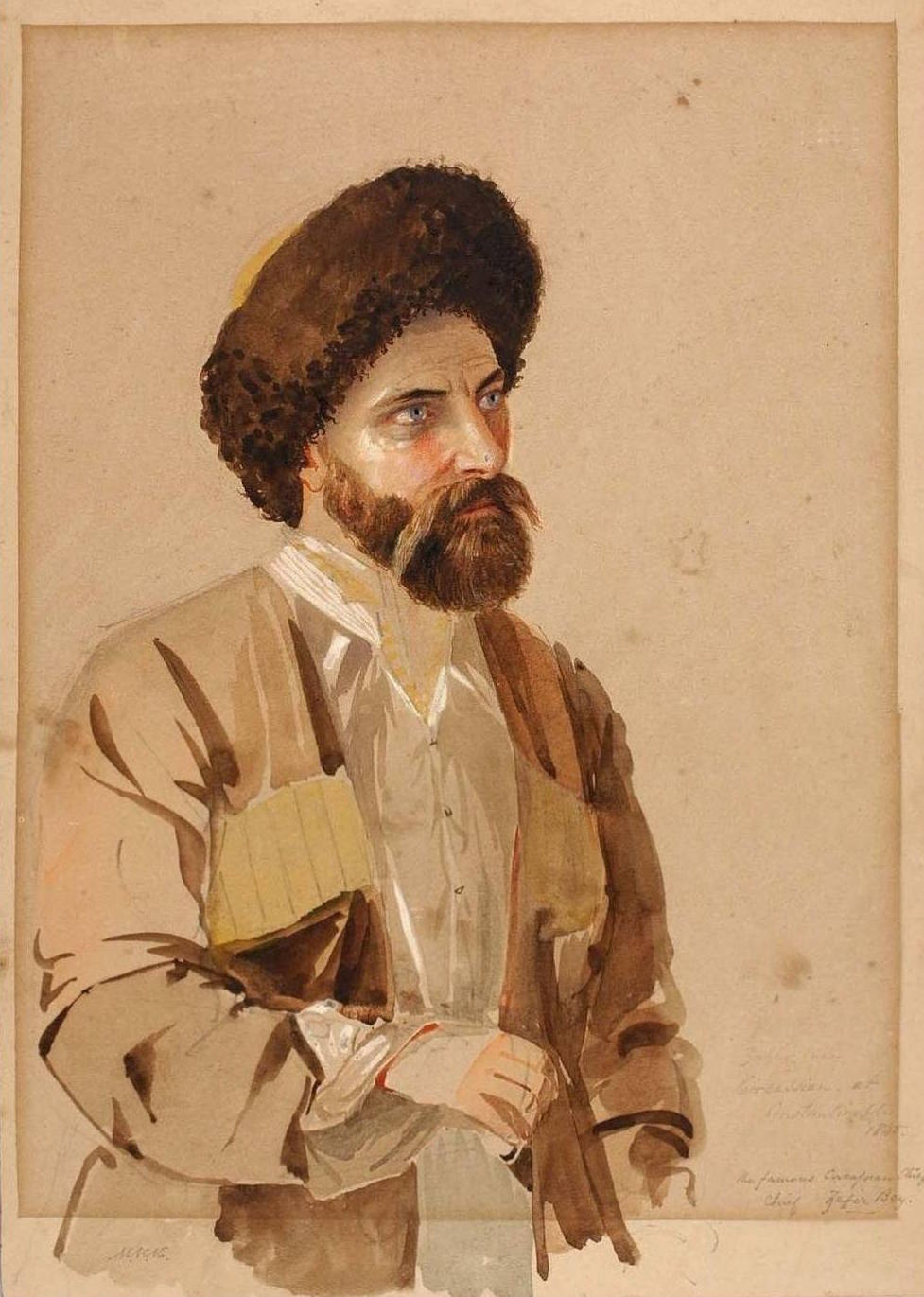
Circassian Prince Sefer Bey Zanuko in 1845

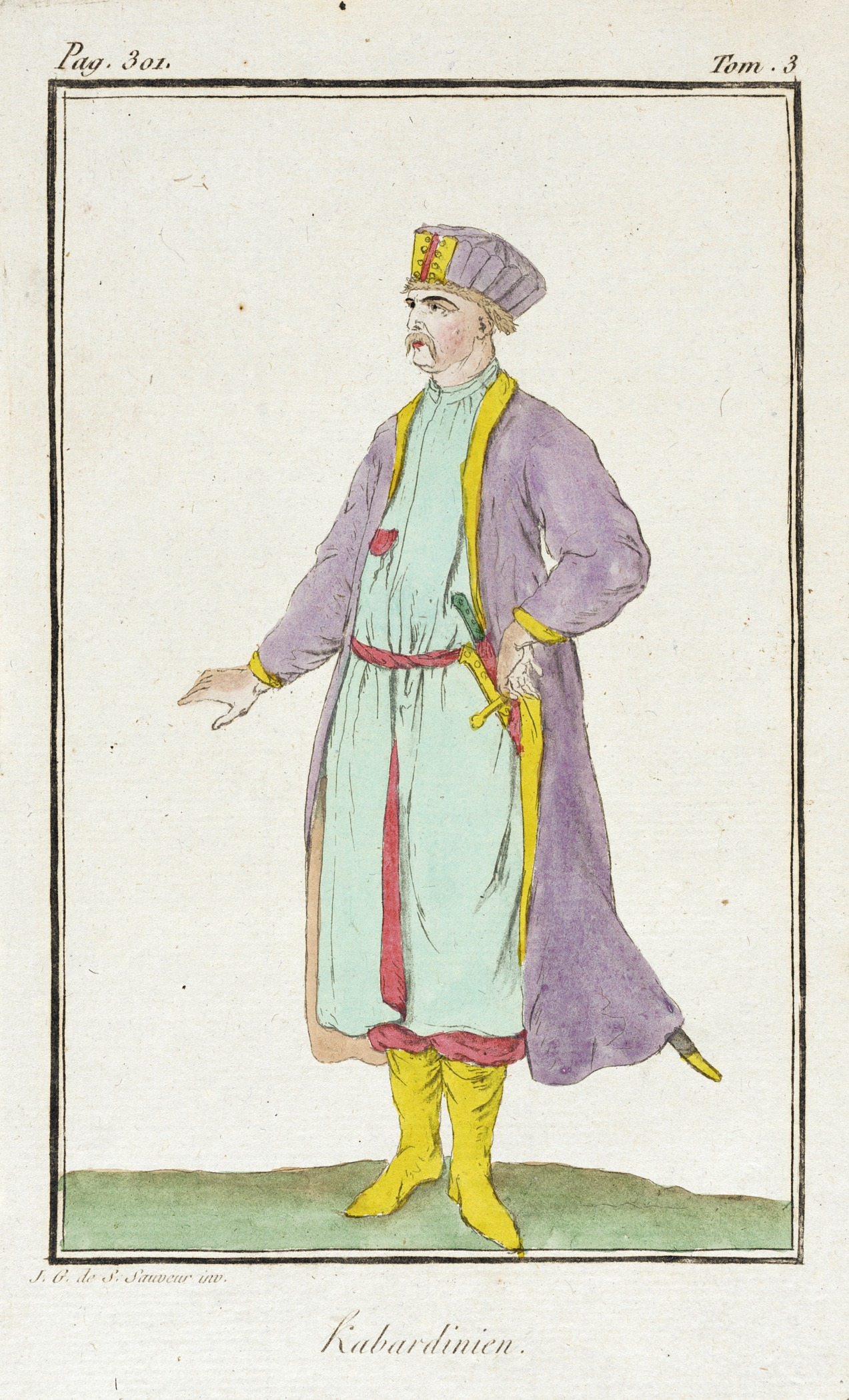
An Adyghe man from Kabarda tribe in regular (non-traditional) wear

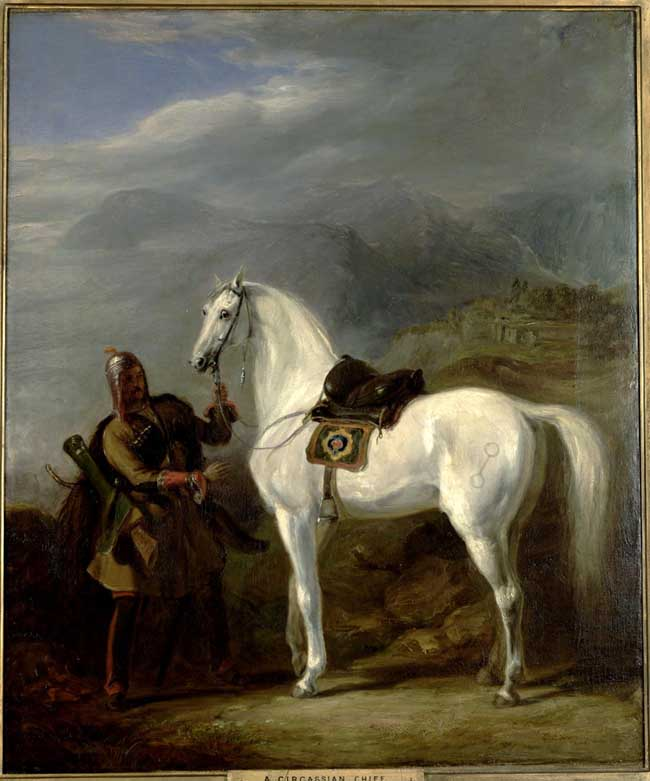
A painting from 1843 of an Adyghe warrior by Sir William Allan

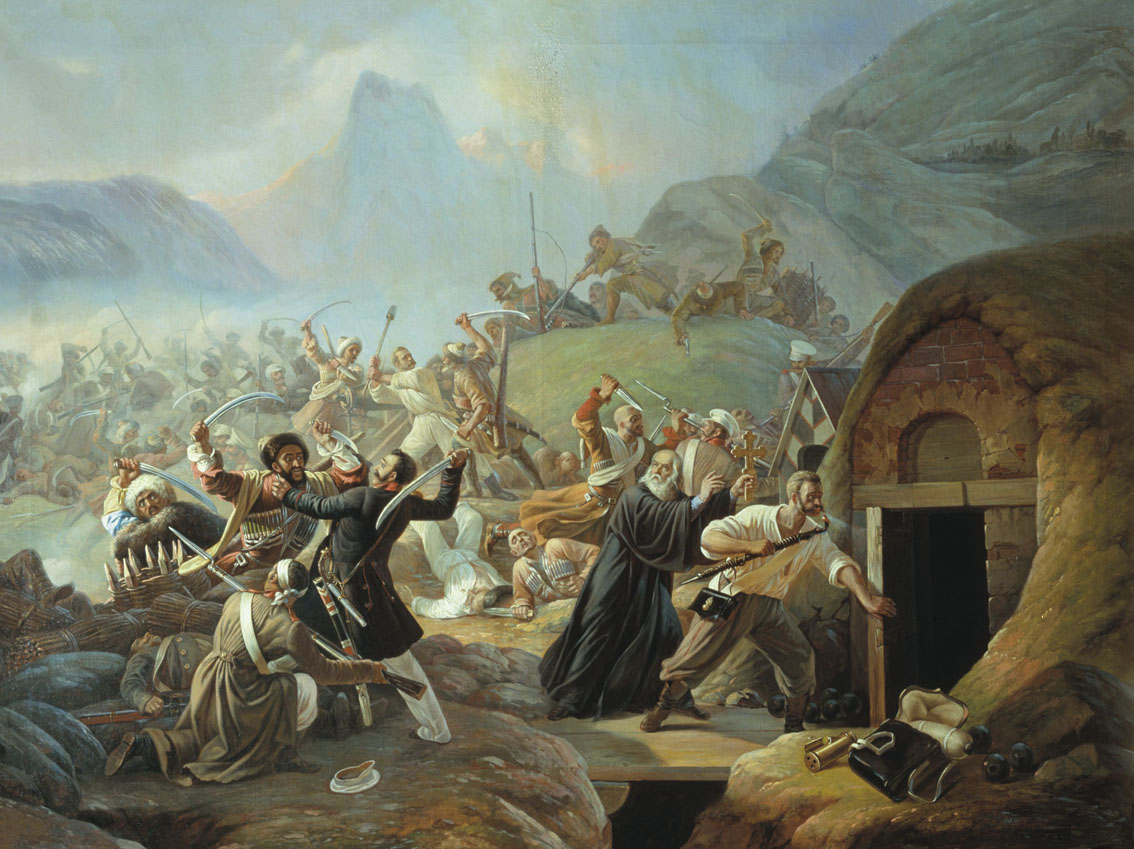
An Adyghe strike on a Russian Military Fort built over a Shapsugian village that aimed to free the Circassian coast from the occupiers during the Russian-Circassian War, 22 March 1840

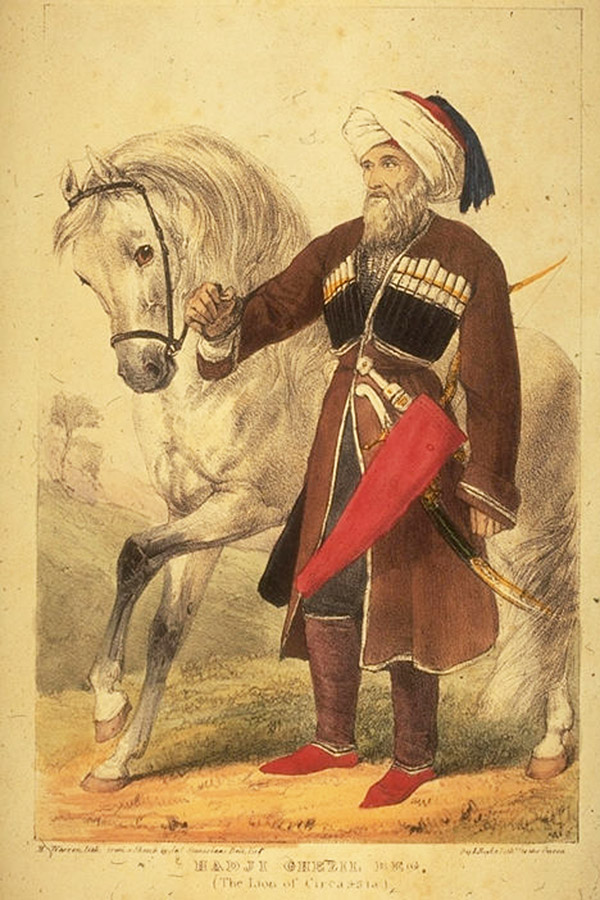
Kazbech Tuguzhoko, Circassian resistance leader

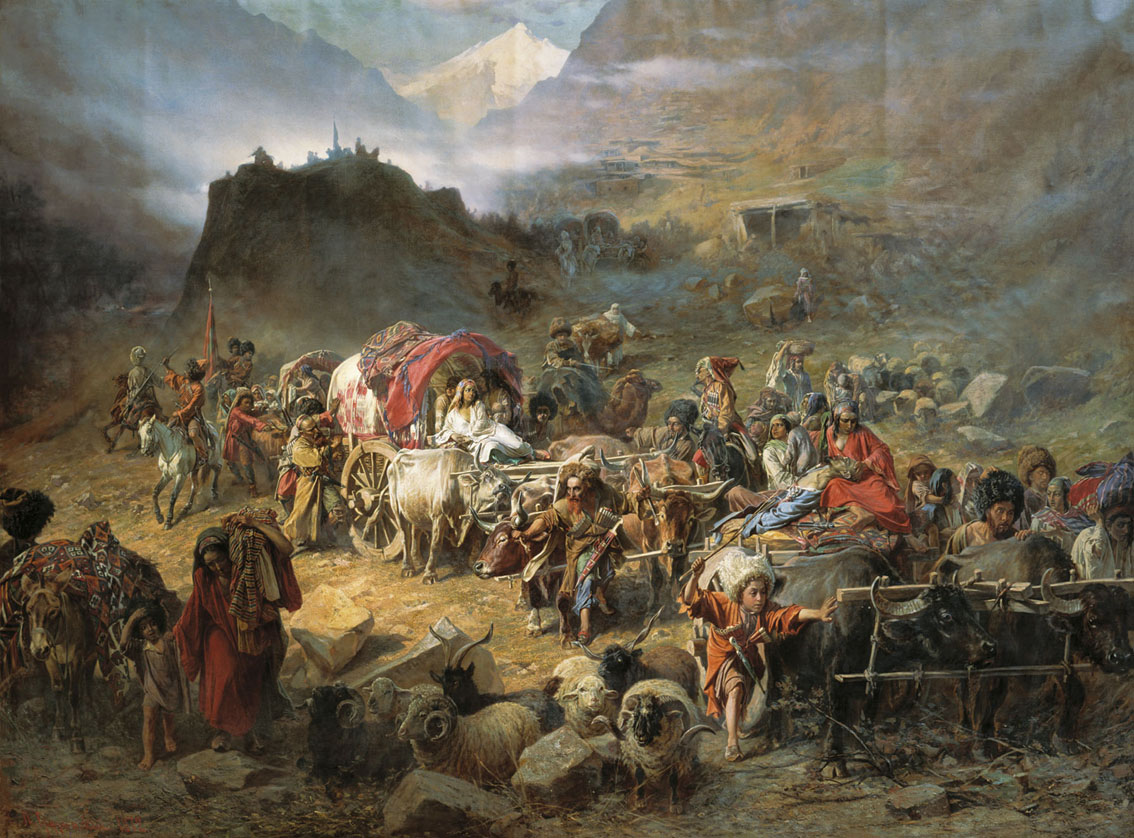
The mountaineers leave the aul, P. N. Gruzinsky, 1872

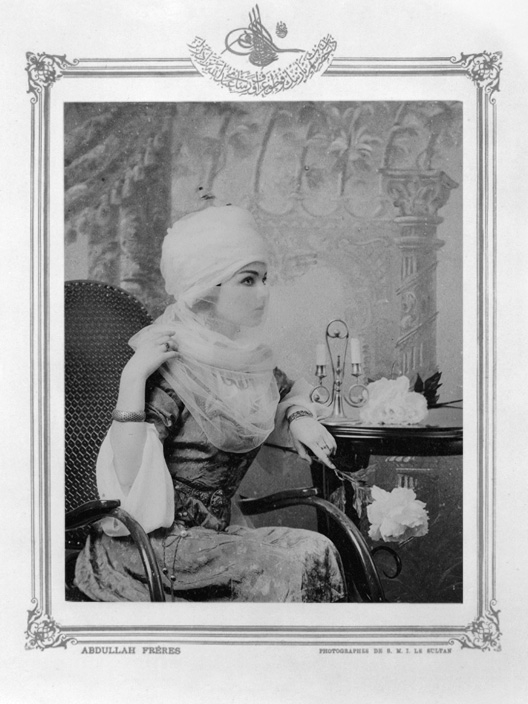
A Circassian noblewoman in the 19th century

== See also ==
- List of Circassians
- Circassian genocide
- Circassians in Egypt
  - Burji (Circassian) Mamluks
  - Abaza family (Egypt)
- Circassian beauties
- Circassians in Israel
- Idar of Kabardia

== Sources ==
- "Всероссийская перепись населения 2010 г. Национальный состав населения Российской Федерации". Demoscope. Archived from the original on 21 May 2012.
- Ahmed, Akbar (2013). The Thistle and the Drone: How America's War on Terror Became a Global War on Tribal Islam. Washington, D.C.: Brookings Institution Press. ISBN 978-0-8157-2379-0.
- Hamed-Troyansky, Vladimir (2024). Empire of Refugees: North Caucasian Muslims and the Late Ottoman State. Stanford, CA: Stanford University Press. ISBN 978-1-5036-3696-5.
- Hamed-Troyansky, Vladimir (2023). "Welcome, Not Welcome: The North Caucasian Diaspora's Attempted Return to Russia since the 1960s". Kritika: Explorations in Russian and Eurasian History. 24 (3): 585–610. doi:10.1353/kri.2023.a904386.
- Hamed-Troyansky, Vladimir (2017). "Circassian Refugees and the Making of Amman, 1878–1914". International Journal of Middle East Studies. 49 (4): 605–623. doi:10.1017/S0020743817000617. S2CID 165801425.
- Hanania, Marwan D. (2018). "From Colony to Capital: Reconsidering the Socio-Economic and Political History of Amman, 1878–1928". Middle Eastern Studies. 55: 1–21. doi:10.1080/00263206.2018.1505612. S2CID 150054384.
- Levene, Mark (2005). Genocide in the Age of the Nation State. Vol. 2: The Rise of the West and Coming Genocide. I.B. Tauris. ISBN 978-1-84511-057-4.
- Manz, Beatrice; Haneda, Masashi (1990). "ČARKAS". In Yarshater, Ehsan (ed.). Encyclopædia Iranica. Vol. IV/7: Calendars II–Cappadocia. London and New York: Routledge & Kegan Paul. pp. 325–326. ISBN 978-0-71009-130-7.
- Reza, Enayotallah; Hirtenstein, Stephen; Gholami, Rahim (2021). "Cherkess (Circassian)". In Madelung, Wilferd; Daftary, Farhad (eds.). Encyclopaedia Islamica Online. Brill Online. ISSN 1875-9831.
- Richmond, Walter (2013) [1994]. The Circassian Genocide. New Brunswick: Rutgers University Press. ISBN 978-0-8135-6069-4.
- Rosser-Owen, Sarah A. S. Isla (1 October 2007). The First 'Circassian Exodus' to the Ottoman Empire (1858–1867), and the Ottoman Response, Based on the Accounts of Contemporary British Observers (Thesis). University of London.
- Shenfield, Stephen D. (1999). "The Circassians: A Forgotten Genocide?". In Levene, Mark; Roberts, Penny (eds.). The Massacre in History. New York: Berghahn Books. pp. 149–162. ISBN 978-1-57181-935-2.
- Taner, Melis (2020). "Illustrated Manuscripts Attributed to Baghdad". Caught in a whirlwind: a cultural history of Ottoman Baghdad as reflected in its illustrated manuscripts. Leiden; Boston: Brill. ISBN 978-9004412699.
