= Circassians in Germany =

Circassian: Нэмцэм ис Адыгэхэр German: Tscherkessen in Deutschland

Total population
- 40,000

Languages
- Circassian, German, Turkish, Russian, Arabic

Religion
- Predominantly Sunni Islam

Related ethnic groups
- other Circassians

Circassians in Germany (Adyghe: Нэмцэм ис Адыгэхэр, romanized: Nemśem yis Adıǵexer; German: Tscherkessen in Deutschland) refers to people born in or residing in Germany who are of Circassian origin. There are around 40,000 Circassians in Germany.

== History ==
=== Circassian exile to Turkey ===
After the Circassian genocide, Circassians were exiled to Ottoman lands and initially suffered heavy tolls. The Circassians were initially housed in schools and mosques or had to live in caves until their resettlement. The Ottoman authorities assigned lands for Circassian settlers close to regular water sources and grain fields. Numerous died in transit to their new homes from disease and poor conditions. Most Circassians ended up settling in Anatolia. As a result, Turkey has the largest Circassian population in the world.

=== Circassian immigration to Germany ===
West Germany signed a labour recruitment agreement with the Republic of Turkey on 30 October 1961, and officially invited the people of Turkey to emigrate to the country. As a result, Circassians in Turkey began to immigrate to Germany and other parts of Europe in the 1960s.

Most Circassian people who immigrated to West Germany intended to live there temporarily and then return to Turkey so that they could build a new life with the money they had earned. However, the number of migrants who returned to Turkey ultimately remained relatively small compared to the number of immigrants arriving in Germany. This was partly due to the family reunification rights that were introduced in 1974 which allowed immigrant workers to bring their families to Germany. Aside from Germany, Circassians also immigrated to the Netherlands, Belgium, France, Switzerland and Austria.

=== Organizations and activities ===
The Circassians in Munich established Europe's first "Caucasian cultural association" on September 22, 1968. Other cultural organizations in Germany and neighboring countries soon followed. In 2004, the Circassian cultural associations of Germany, the Netherlands and Belgium established the "Federation of Circassian Cultural Associations in Europe". Only 18% of Circassians in Europe declared that they were fluent in their mother tongue.

== Culture ==
The Circassian people who immigrated to Germany brought their culture with them, including their language, religion, food, and arts.

=== Food ===
Circassian cuisine is an ethnic cuisine, based on the cooking style and traditions of the Circassians. Circassian cuisine consists of many different traditional dishes, varying by season. The summer time traditional dishes are mainly dairy products and vegetables. In winter and spring, the traditional dishes mostly consist of flour and meat. Traditional dishes include ficcin, seasoned chicken or turkey with sauce, boiled mutton and beef with a seasoning of sour milk along with salt and crushed garlic. Circassians in Germany who immigrated from Turkey also traditionally consume Turkish cuisine.

=== Language ===
Most Circassians in Germany speak the Turkish language as their mother tongue, but some also speak the Circassian language, a subdivision of the Northwest Caucasian language family. The Circassian language exhibits a large number of consonants: between 50 and 60 consonants in various dialects. The earliest written records of the Circassian languages are in the Arabic script, recorded by the Turkish traveller Evliya Çelebi in the 17th century. Circassians in Germany mainly speak the German language more fluently than their native Turkish and Circassian languages.

=== Religion ===
The Circassian people in Germany are predominantly Muslim. The Circassians in Germany mostly identify as Sunni Muslims of Hanafi madh'hab.

== Notable individuals ==
- Cem Özdemir – politician, co–chairman of the German Green Party
- Asuman Krause – actress, singer, model and TV presenter who was crowned Miss Turkey in 1998
- Şamil Çinaz – professional footballer
- Hakan Albayrak – journalist and activist
- Sinan Albayrak – TV and film actor
- Fahriye Evcen – actress and model
- Uğur İnceman – former professional footballer who played as a midfielder
