= Circassians in Libya =

Либием ис Адыгэхэр
- Circassian flag

Total population
- 35,000

Regions with significant populations
- Misrata and Benghazi

Languages
- Circassian languages, Arabic, Berber

Religion
- Islam

Circassians in Libya (Adyghe: Либием ис Адыгэхэр, romanized: Libiyem yis Adıgəxər) refers to the Circassian diaspora settled in Libya, numbering about 30,000 today. They live mainly in Misrata and Benghazi. They have been integrated into Libyan society and are mostly Arabised.

== History ==
Unlike the majority other Circassian diasporas in the Middle East, the Libyan Circassians are not descendants of the Circassians exiled during the Circassian genocide, but are descendants of the Circassian Mamluks who served in the armies of the Arab caliphs since the 9th century. The traditions among Libyan Circassians have mostly been Arabised.

== Gaddafi era ==
The Circassians in Kosovo moved to the Republic of Adygea in 1998 and Muammar Gaddafi sent support and donations to the village. Gaddafi, according to his own words, showed a deep respect for the Circassians and their historical suffering.

In March 2011, Muammar Gaddafi delegated a diplomat to the Jordanian capital of Amman to meet Circassians in Jordan and get their support. The Jordanian Circassians, convinced that the Libyan Circassians have lost their identity and became Arabs, did not respond.

== Umar Muhayshi ==
Umar Muhayshi was a Libyan army officer.
