= Guaye =

Extinct Circassian tribe

The Guaye (Adyghe: Гъуае) were one of the Circassian tribes. They were destroyed after the Circassian genocide following the Russo-Circassian War, as not a single member survived.

== Mentions ==
In 1857, Leonty Yakovlevich Lyulie gave a description of them, which was the last known mention of them in history. In 1930, the ethnographer Leonid Lavrov noted some Guaye families living in the village of Tkhagapsh.
