= Natukhajs =

Circassian tribe

Natukhaj
НатIхъуадж (Adyghe)
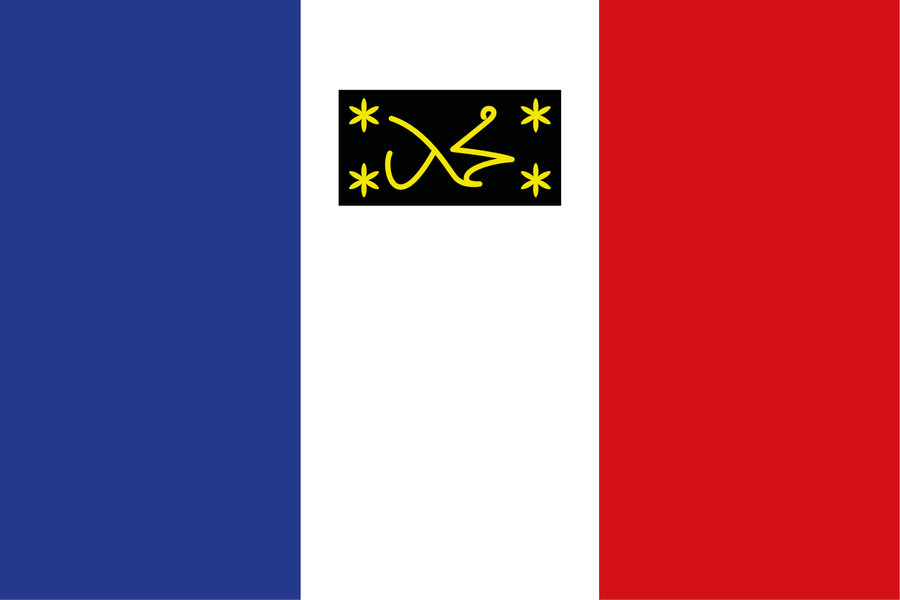
- Natukhaj flag

Total population
- c. 3,030?

Languages
- Adyghe; Turkish and Russian

Religion
- Islam

Related ethnic groups
- Other Circassian tribes

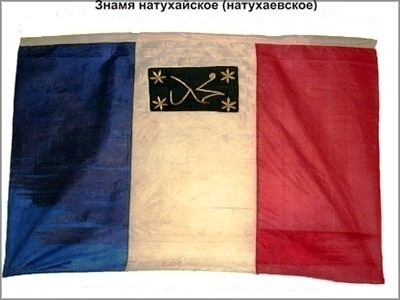
A Natukhaj flag

The Natukhaj (Note: Adyghe: НатIхъуадж, Натыхъуэдж, Нэткъуадж, Нэтыхъуай; Russian: Натухайцы; Turkish: Natuhay, Natukay) are one of the twelve major Circassian tribes, representing one of the twelve stars on the green-and-gold Circassian flag. Their areas historically extended along the Black Sea coast from Anapa in the north to Tsemes Bay (now Novorossiysk) in the south and from the north side of the mountains to the lower Kuban River.

Currently, Natukhaj families live in the diaspora and were assimilated in other Adyghe tribes, more precisely, the Shapsug due to their close relations with them. In Russia, a few may be found in the Republic of Adyghea (mainly in the Takhtamukaysky District, in the rural locality of Natukhay (Russian: Аул Натухай) and the Teuchezhsky District).

== History ==
The Natukhai tribe consisted of 10 aristocratic families and 44 free clans (Adyghe: фэкъолI) and classified as an Adyghe democratic tribe. Because their coast was not backed by high mountains and opened northward to the steppe the Natukhai were very active in trading with the Ottoman Empire and Crimean Khanate, which afforded for them better life than many others.

By culture, language and character they find themselves closest to the Lesser Shapsug and even call themselves by the same name Aguchips. (The Lesser Shapsug lived on the coast south of the Natukhai while the Greater Shapsug lived north of the mountains.) Also Natukhai people include the tribe of Guaye which, according to legend, is one of the most ancient Circassian tribes. They also include the disappearing remnants of the Zhaney tribe. The noblest families included Chakh, Dedy, Eryku, Kaz, Megu, Shupako, and Zan. The tribe Guaye had following noble names: Birdzh, Cherch, Kerzedzh, Khatirame, and Kuytsuk.

The Natukhai, like the Shapsug and Abadzekh, managed to limit the power of noble men of their tribe. Their villages were also administered by elected villagers. The Natukhai were one of the tribes most inclined to a peaceful sort of labor. They established trade connections with Turkey which gave the Natukhai the opportunities of material improvements. The Natukhai were one of the last to convert to Islam. They steadily adhered to Christianity, even though religious differences were often the cause of quarrels with the neighbouring Shapsug. Only by the beginning of the 19th century, whether by promises or by threats, did Turkish pasha manage to talk them into converting to Islam. In spite of that, the Natukhai showed a bitter resistance to the expansion of Russia into the Northern Caucasus. They fought shoulder-to-shoulder with the Shapsug and Abadzekh who by that time were on their own against the forces of Russian empire. As a result of the war, only 175 Natukhai people remained on their motherland.

In late 1860, a Circassian Parliament (Adyghe: Хасэ, romanized: Hasè) was assembled, which would unite the Shapsug, Ubykh, and Natukhai and considered Sochi (Lowland Adyghe: Шъачэ; Ubykh Adyghe: Шуа-чӀа, lit. "seaside") the last capital of the Circassian resistance.

In 1864, a major part of the Natukhai were massacred and the remaining forced to leave Circassia, like the other Adyghe tribes, to the Ottoman Empire due to the Russian army occupation of Circassia, beside the standard tsars' policy during the era of the Russian Empire to cleanse the Circassian coast of Circassians (mainly physically then by expelling the remaining to the Ottoman Empire.

== Language ==
The Natukhai people speak the Natukhai sub-dialect (Adyghe: НатIхъуаджэбзэ), a dialect which is very similar to the Shapsug sub-dialect. The Natukhai sub-dialect shares a large number of features with other Shapsug varieties like having the consonants гь [ɡʲ], кь [kʲ], кӏь [kʲʼ] and чъу [t͡ɕʷ] that correspond to дж [d͡ʒ], ч [t͡ʃ], кӏ [t͡ʃʼ] and цу [t͡sʷ] in other Adyghe sub-dialects (e.g. Abzakh, Bzhedug, and Temirgoy).

Meaning	Natukhai and Shapsug sub-dialect		Other sub-dialects	
Meaning	Cyrillic	IPA	Cyrillic	IPA
shirt	гьанэ	[ɡʲaːna]	джанэ	[d͡ʒaːna]
chicken	кьэт	[kʲat]	чэты	[t͡ʃatə]
rope	кӏьапсэ	[kʲʼaːpsa]	кӏапсэ	[t͡ʃʼaːpsa]
shoe	чъуакъэ	[t͡ʃʷaːqa]	цуакъэ	[t͡sʷaːqa]

== See also ==
Other Adyghe tribes:

- Abzakh
- Besleney
- Bzhedug
- Hatuqwai
- Kabardian
- Mamkhegh
- Shapsug
- Temirgoy
- Ubykh
- Yegeruqwai
- Zhaney
