= Kheghache =

Extinct Circassian tribe

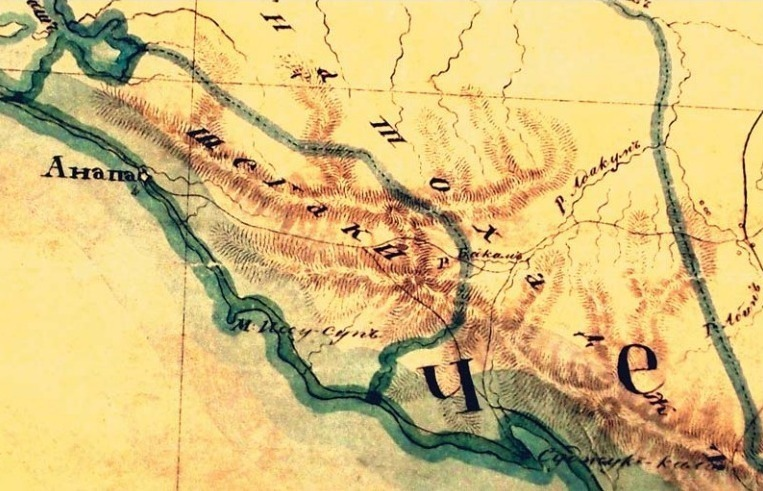
Historical settlement area of the Hegayk tribe near Anapa.

The Kheghache (Note: Adyghe: Хэгъакӏэ, romanized: Khəghachə Russian: Хегак, romanized: Khegak) were one of the Circassian tribes. They were completely exterminated in the Circassian genocide following the Russo-Circassian War. None were recorded to have survived. In some sources, they are also mentioned under the name "Shegayk".

== History ==
The Kheghache lived in the vicinity of Anapa.

In 1666, Evliya Çelebi, when describing the Anapa fortress, wrote:

"The fortress was built very skillfully and is the creation of a skilled engineer. Inside it are the sheep and goats of the Kheghache tribe. "

At the same time, Evliya Çelebi compiled a detailed description of their life and everyday life:

"...These people are known as very strong and brave horsemen. There was a big fight because one of the Tatar warriors took a fish from a Circassian base. The Tatars stole their fish, and they [Circassians] killed them all. From there I went east again, passing dangerous places. All five hundred and fifty houses of the tribe, covered with reeds, fenced, have two doors - one after the other. In all houses there are very capable, skillful people, whose hands are not alien to any craft. If we called them "kafirs" (infidels), they were angry, and if we called them "Muslims", they were happy. However, even if they claim to be Muslims, they deny the resurrection of people on the day of the Judgment... May God forgive us. Their chief, Enjiruk-Bey, eighty years old, bearded, deaf, is a well-fed kafir... This chief owns three thousand horse and foot soldiers."

In the 18th century, the number of Kheghache had decreased significantly. Glavani reports about one Kheghache district of 500 dwellings, managed by a chief. The district was located near the coast of the Azov Sea.

In 1724, Xaverio Glavani (French consul in Crimea) at the beginning of 1724, when describing Circassia, wrote:

"The Kheghache district has one chief, to which 500 people are subordinate"

And yet, at this time, a small group of Kheghaches still lived near Anapa. It was led by Prince Mehmed Zan, who had several ships and engaged in fishing. Pallas says:

"Kheghache are extremely ruined and have diminished in numbers. As a result of plague epidemics and constant hostilities of the Crimean Khanate, the Russo-Circassian War, they were destroyed, and surviving groups of Kheghaches left, joining other Adyghe tribes - Chemguy, Natukhaj, Shapsugs."

In 1808, Julius Klaproth, in his work "Travel in the Caucasus and Georgia", reported:

"The small Circassian tribe Kheghache now lives not near Anapa, but on the Bugur and its tributaries. Their Circassian name means: "living near the sea". It had a prince named Mehmet-Girey-Zhana and lived earlier on the site where Anapa was built. Their number decreased significantly as a result of attacks. Their prince was a rich man who traded and had ships on the Black Sea."

In 1820. Frédéric Dubois de Montpere, author of "Travel around the Caucasus", wrote:

"the number of the Kheghache tribe is 20,000 people at most"

After the Russo-Circassian War, the Kheghache disappeared and were no longer mentioned.
