= Russian Black Sea coast =

Section of coastline

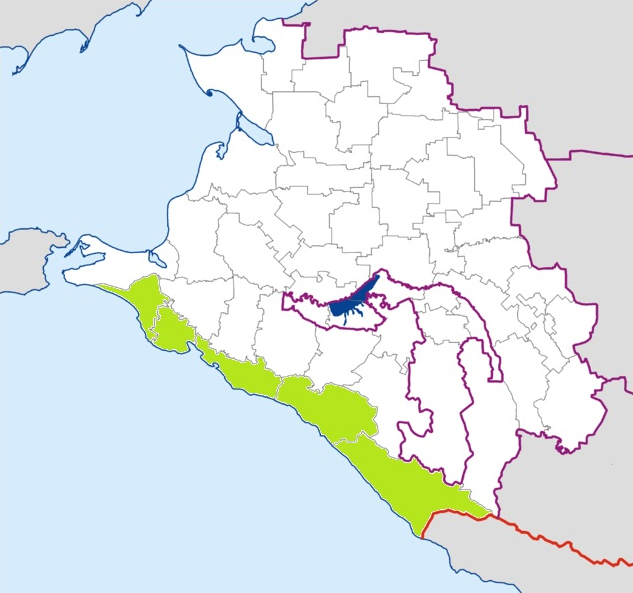
The Circassian coast

Circassian Coast (Adyghe: Адыгэ хы аушу, Adyge xy aušu; Russian: Черкесское побережье, tr. Čerkesskoe poberž′e) was the coast of historical Circassia on the Black Sea before 1864, extending from Anapa in the north to Adler in the south, and including cities like Tuapse and Sochi.

The coastline was ceded to Russia in 1829 as a result of the Caucasian War and the Russo-Turkish War, However, in 1828 the Circassians did not admit Russian control over Circassia because Circassia was not considered a part of the Ottoman Empire, instead claiming the Circassians were the real owners of Circassia. Thus, they kept resisting the newly established Russian outposts along the coast and the inner lands in the Russian–Circassian War.

A significant part of the Circassian Coast is located in the subtropical zone of varying degrees of humidification and is a resort area for most of its length.

== Geography ==
The Circassian Coast of the Black Sea coast of the Caucasus and Crimea lies in the extreme northern part of the subtropical zone. The Anapa-Tuapse, Alushta-Kerch and Hero City of Sevastopol strips of the Russian Black Sea coast are arid subtropical regions of Russia, similar in climate to the southern Caspian coast of the Republic of Dagestan. The Tuapse-Sochi (Adler) and Yalta-Alushta strips are the only humid subtropical regions in Russia and the northernmost in the world.

In the eastern part of the Black Sea, the boundary between climatic zones runs right along the chains of the Main Caucasian Ridge, i.e. the Greater Caucasus is a natural obstacle, a barrier separating two different air masses. To the north lies the temperate zone, and to the south the subtropical zone. The mountain system of the Greater Caucasus reinforces the boundary between them, making it difficult to transfer cold air masses from north to south, to Transcaucasia, and warm air masses from south to north, to Cis-Caucasia. The mountain barrier in the form of the Greater Caucasus is particularly noticeable in winter, when the Cis-Caucasus is filled with cold air masses from the north and northeast, and Transcaucasia is protected from their invasion.

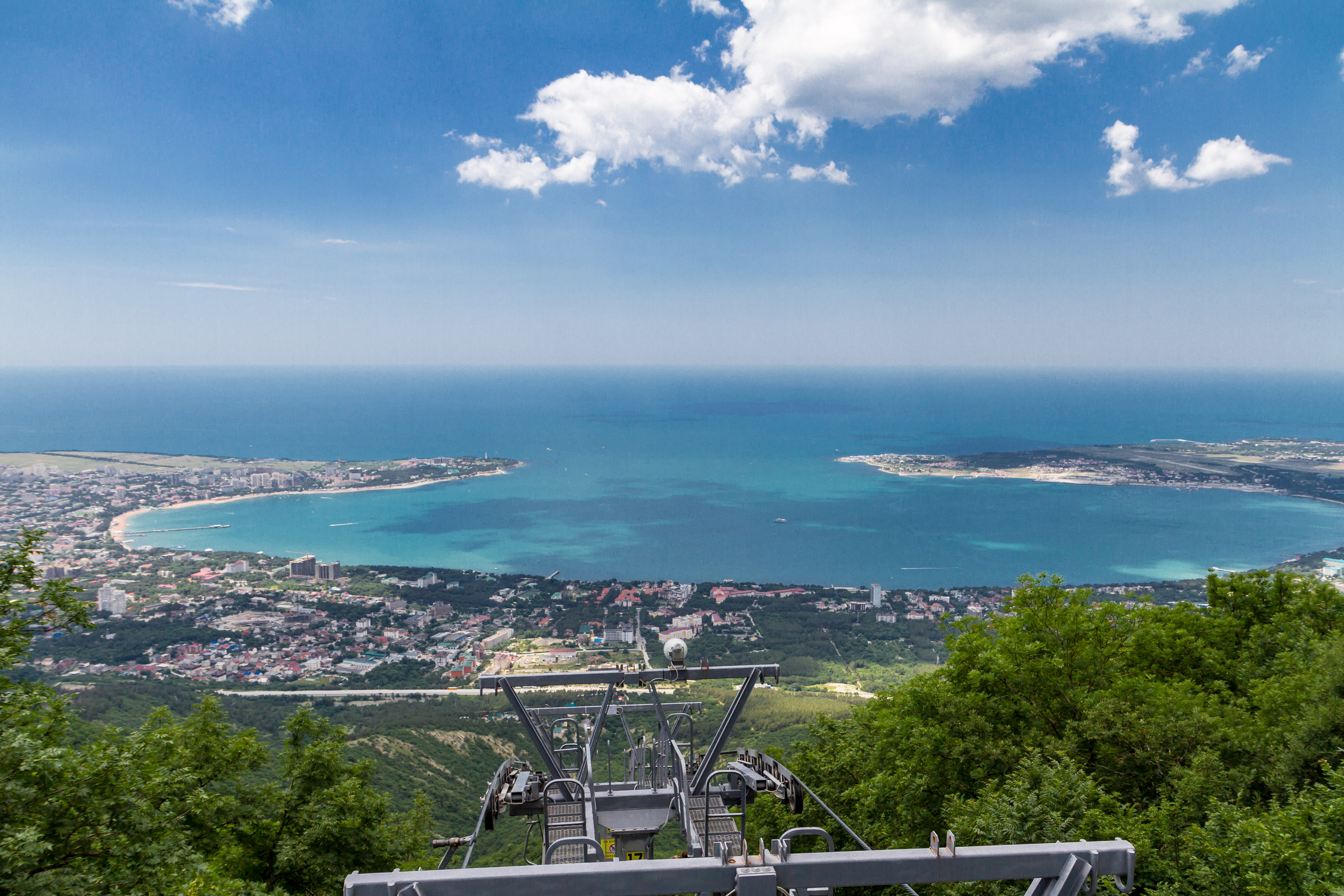
Gelendzhik bay

In the far north, the coastline of the Black Sea coast of the Caucasus is winding, lowland, there are many swamps (the Kuban Delta), fresh lakes and brackish estuaries (Vityazevsky Liman and others). There are sand spits, shoals, alluvial deposits, floodplains, islands and peninsulas (Taman). After Anapa, the coast becomes mountainous, with two large bay ports (Novorossiysk Bay and Gelendzhik Bay). After Gelendzhik, the coast is flat, interrupted only by the mouths and alluvial fans of small rivers flowing from the Caucasus Mountains into the Black Sea. In places the coast is steep and rocky, the most prominent being Kiseleva Rock near the town of Tuapse. A distinctive feature of the Russian Black Sea coast is the presence of several types of beaches in a relatively short 500 kilometre stretch. There are soft beaches with fine sand, hard beaches with large pebbles, bays and rocky beaches. In the Anapa region there are quartz sand beaches.
