= List of Circassians =

Notable people of Circassian origin

This is an incomplete list of world-famous or notable Circassians, including both full Circassians and people of at least 50% Circassian descent. Figures who belong in two categories (i.e. a military officer who is also a politician) have only been placed in one of the categories. In previous usage, the term Circassian also included the Abkhazians.

== Cultural ==
(* = Circassian descent only on paternal side)

(** = Circassian descent only on maternal side)

=== Cultural figures ===
- Tevfik Esenç – Last known fully competent speaker of the Ubykh language.

=== Historians and writers ===
- Hayriye-Melech Xhundj – One of the first woman Circassian writers
- Nâzım Hikmet** – Poet, playwright, novelist, screenwriter, director and memoirist.
- Amirkhan Kamizovich Shomakhov – lyrics, prose, and play writer, primarily known as one of the founders of the Kabardian children's literature
- Ahmed Shawqi – Egyptian poet-Laureate
- Fekry Pasha Abaza - Egyptian writer and political activist.
- Kuba Shaaban – writer, poet, musician and historian.
- Tharwat Abaza -Egyptian novelist and journalist.
- Hasan Cemal** – Turkish journalist, historian and writer
- Nadine Jolie Courtney – American journalist and author of Beauty Confidential and All-American Muslim Girl
- Mohydeen Izzat Quandour – Writer, intellectual, film producer and director, and musician
- Amjad Jaimoukha – One of the most influential Circassian writers and publicists
- Aziz Pasha Abaza - a significant figure in modern Arabic poetry.
- Kostë Çekrezi* – also known as Constantin Anastas Chekrezi, was an Albanian patriot, historian, and publicist. He was Circassian by origin through his father's family.
- Orhan Pamuk – Nobel Laureate
- Shora Nogmov – Kabardian historian and public figure

=== Architects ===
- Ali Maher – Jordanian architect

== Military officers ==
=== Ancient ===
- Hekataios of Sindike – king of the Sindians throughout the reign of both Satyros I and Leukon I, rulers of the Bosporan Kingdom.
- Oktamasades of Sindike – king of the Sindians. He usurped the throne from his father some time in 383 BC after his failed war against Oktamasades's mother, Tirgatao.

=== 1st–17th century ===
==== Princes of Circassia ====
- Inal the Great – Supreme Prince (King) of Circassia from 1427 to 1453 who unified all Circassians (then divided into several princedoms) into one state.

==== Princes of Kabardia ====
- Idar of Kabardia – Supreme Prince of Kabardia. He was the son of Prince Inarmaz, and the grandson of Prince Tabula. Prince Inarmaz himself was the eldest of the three grandsons of Prince Inal. His rule spanned over the period of 1525 to 1540.
- Temruqo the Brave – Supreme Prince of Kabardia. When Temruqo came to power, he put down the revolts of the disputing princes, and helped Circassia become a military power within the North Caucasus.
- Beslan the Fat – Supreme Prince of Kabardia
- Sholokh the Mighty – Supreme Prince of Kabardia
- Kurghoqo Hatokhshoqo – Supreme Prince of Kabardia who won the Battle of Kanzhal.
- Jankhot Qushuq – Last Supreme Prince of Kabardia.

==== Safavid people ====
- Yusuf Agha – Safavid gholam and courtier who wielded great influence and power during the reign of king Abbas I.
- Qazaq Khan Cherkes – Safavid military commander who also served as the governor of Shirvan (1624–1633) and Astarabad (1639–1640)
- Farhad Beg Cherkes – Safavid military commander
- Behbud Khan Cherkes – Safavid military commander
- Fereydun Khan Cherkes – Safavid military commander who served as the governor of Astarabad
- Najafqoli Khan Cherkes – Safavid military commander who served as the governor of Shirvan and Erivan

=== 18th–19th century ===
Qerandiqo Berzeg

==== Russo-Circassian War participants ====
- Qalebatuqo Hatuqay Shupako – politician and military commander who served as the 1st leader of the Circassian Confederation from 1807 to 1827.
- Ismail Berzeg – military commander and politician who served as the 2nd leader of the Circassian Confederation from 1827 to 1839. He was also the princely leader of the Ubykh tribe.
- Seferbiy Zaneqo – military commander and diplomat who served as the 5th leader of the Circassian Confederation from 1859 to 1860.
- Qerandiqo Berzeg – military commander who served as the 6th and last leader of the Circassian Confederation from 1860 to 1864. After the Circassian genocide, he was exiled to the Ottoman Empire, volunteered in the Ottoman army against Russia, and died there of old age.
- Kizbech Tughuzhuqo – military commander who took part in the Russo-Circassian War. Personally witnessing all of his family get killed by the Russian army, he received multiple offers from the Russian Empire to switch sides and join its Imperial ranks but he refused all offers and closed negotiations.
- Jembulat Boletoqo – military commander, politician, nobleman and leader of the Chemguy region. He was famous for his courage and tough will. He had great influence among all Circassians, including the Abzakhs, with whom he was associated with.
- Qerzech Shirikhuqo – military commander and the leader of the Natukhaj region.
- Pshiquy Akhezhaqo – politician, military commander and the leader prince of the Bzhedug region.
- Ale Khirtsizhiqo – military commander from the Abzakh region.

=== 20th–21st century ===
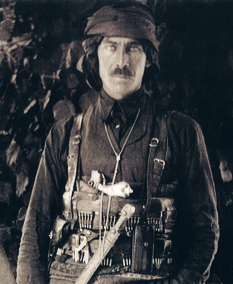
Ethem Psheu

==== Ottoman military officers ====
- Çerkes Ethem – guerilla leader, social bandit, efe and soldier. Nicknamed the "Rankless General" by his supporters and crowned as the "National Hero" by Mustafa Kemal Atatürk, he initially gained fame for establishing the Kuva-yi Seyyare and putting down multiple great-scale rebellions and gaining key major victories against the Greek armies invading Anatolia during the Turkish War of Independence.
- Yusuf Izzet Pasha – a general of the Ottoman Army and the Turkish Army.
- Suleyman Askeri Pasha – Ottoman soldier and co founder of the Teşkilât-ı Mahsusa (Special Organisation)
- Yakub Cemil – Ottoman revolutionary and soldier, who assassinated Nazım Pasha during the 1913 Ottoman coup d'état.
- Mufid Bey Libohova – Albanian economist, diplomat and politician and one of the delegates at the Assembly of Vlorë (28 November 1912) where the Albanian Declaration of Independence took place. He served as the first Minister of Interior of Albania, during the Provisional Government of Albania. His mother Behixhe Hamza was a Circassian from Tuapse. He served as an Ottoman official before the independence of Albania.
- Zeki Pasha – WWI and Balkan Wars field marshal
- Arslan Toğuz – police commissioner of the Ottoman Empire
- Rüştü Sakarya – officer of Ottoman army

==== Turkish military officers ====
- Cemil Cahit Toydemir – Officer of the Ottoman Army and a general of the Turkish Army.
- Ismail Hakkı Berkok – General of Mountainous Republic, Turkish and Ottoman armies

==== Egyptian military officers ====
- Salah Salem – Egyptian Military officer and member in the Egyptian Revolutionary Command Council
- Gamal Salem – Egyptian Air Force officer and political figure
- Hussein el-Shafei – Egyptian Military officer and member in the Egyptian Revolutionary Command Council
- Zakaria Mohieddin – Egyptian Military officer and member in the Egyptian Revolutionary Command Council
- General officer Aziz Almasri – Egyptian Military officer

==== Libyan military officers ====
- Umar Muhayshi – member of the Libyan Revolutionary Command Council that ruled Libya.

==== Syrian military officers ====
- Bassam Abdel Majeed – Syrian military officer, politician and diplomat.

==== Insurgency in the North Caucasus participants ====
- Anzor Astemirov – Kabardian Salafi jihadist militant, best known for his 2004 and 2005 raids on Nalchik.
- Ratmir Shameyev – Kabardian Salafi jihadist militant

== Athletes ==
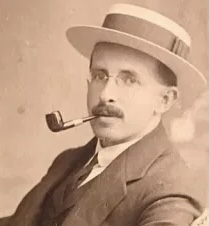
Ayetullah Bey

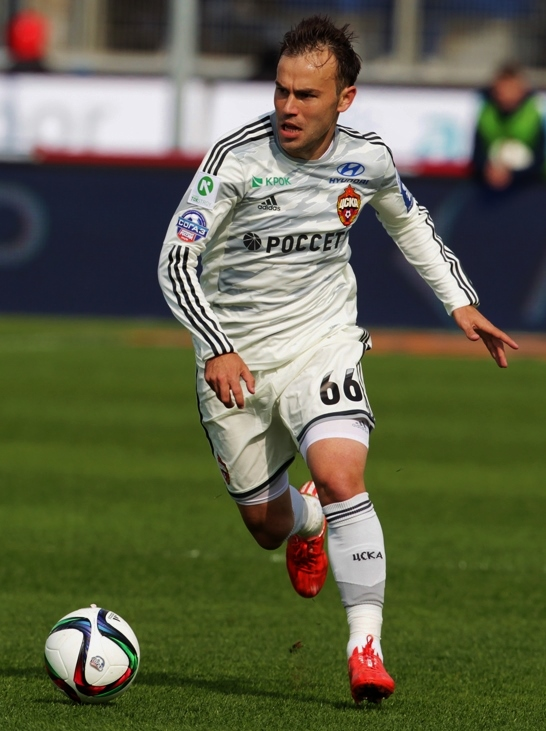
Bibras Natcho

=== UFC fighter ===
- Azamat Murzakanov

=== Football and basketball ===
- Emre Belözoğlu – football player and manager
- Şamil Çinaz – footballer
- Can Bartu – Former professional basketball and football player and pundit
- Ayetullah Bey – footballer, founder and second president of the major Turkish multi–sport club Fenerbahçe SK
- Süleyman Seba – Ex–President of Beşiktaş J.K.
- Oğuz Çetin – football player and manager
- Mesut Bakkal – football player and manager
- Feras Esmaeel – footballer
- Yanal Abaza – footballer
- Tamer Haj Mohamad – footballer
- Bibras Natcho – footballer
- Izhak Nash – footballer
- Nili Natkho – basketball player
- Jankat Yılmaz – footballer

=== Martial arts ===
- Aslanbek Khushtov – wrestler, 2008 Summer Olympics winner.
- Murat Kardanov is a wrestler of Circassian descent who won the gold medal in the 2000 summer Olympics
- Yaşar Doğu – 1948 London Olympics middleweight wrestling champion
- Gazanfer Bilge (July 23, 1924 – April 20, 2008) was a wrestler of Circassian descent who won the gold medal in the Featherweight class of Men's Freestyle Wrestling at the 1948 Olympics.
- Hamit Kaplan (20 September 1934 – 5 January 1976) was a World and Olympic champion sports wrestler of Circassian descent in the Heavyweight class.
- Bilyal Makhov – Mixed Martial Artist and 2012 Olympic Bronze medalist in freestyle wrestling
- Beslan Mudranov – Judo, 2016 Olympics gold medalist
- Adil Candemir – Wrestler, 1948 London Olympics silver medalist

== Theologians and philosophers ==
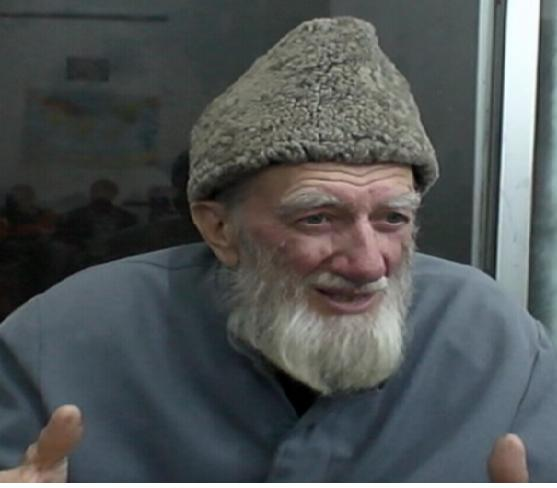
Jawdat Said

=== Islamic clergy ===
- Anas Pshikhachev – served as Head of the Spiritual Administration of the Muslims of Kabardino-Balkaria from April 2004 until his assassination in December 2010
- Caner Dagli – Islamic scholar and associate professor of Religious Studies at the College of the Holy Cross in Worcester, Massachusetts.
- Jawdat Said – Islamic scholar and nonviolence advocate.
- Al-Kawthari – Islamic scholar and theologian of the Maturidi school and the adjunct to the last Shaykh al-Islam of the Ottoman Empire.

=== Christian clergy ===
- Carlo de' Medici** – Italian priest, senior clergyman and collector, a member of the powerful Medici family

=== Philosophers ===
- Jabagh Qazanoqo – philosopher, poet, military strategist, and diplomat who gained fame for reforming the Circassian justice system based on the Quran and Adyghe Xabze. He played a big role in the Battle of Kanzhal.

== Politicians ==
=== Jordanian politicians ===
- Sa'id Mufti – Jordanian independent politician, serving in several governments as interior minister (1944–1945, 1948–1950, 1951–1953 and 1957). He was Minister of Finance in 1945. He served as the President of the Senate of Jordan from December 1956 to July 1963 and from November 1965 to November 1974.
- Ismael Babouk – The first Mayor of Jordan's capital, Amman (1909–1911)
- Toujan al-Faisal – Human rights activist, member of Jordanian Parliament 1993–1997, first woman ever elected to the parliament

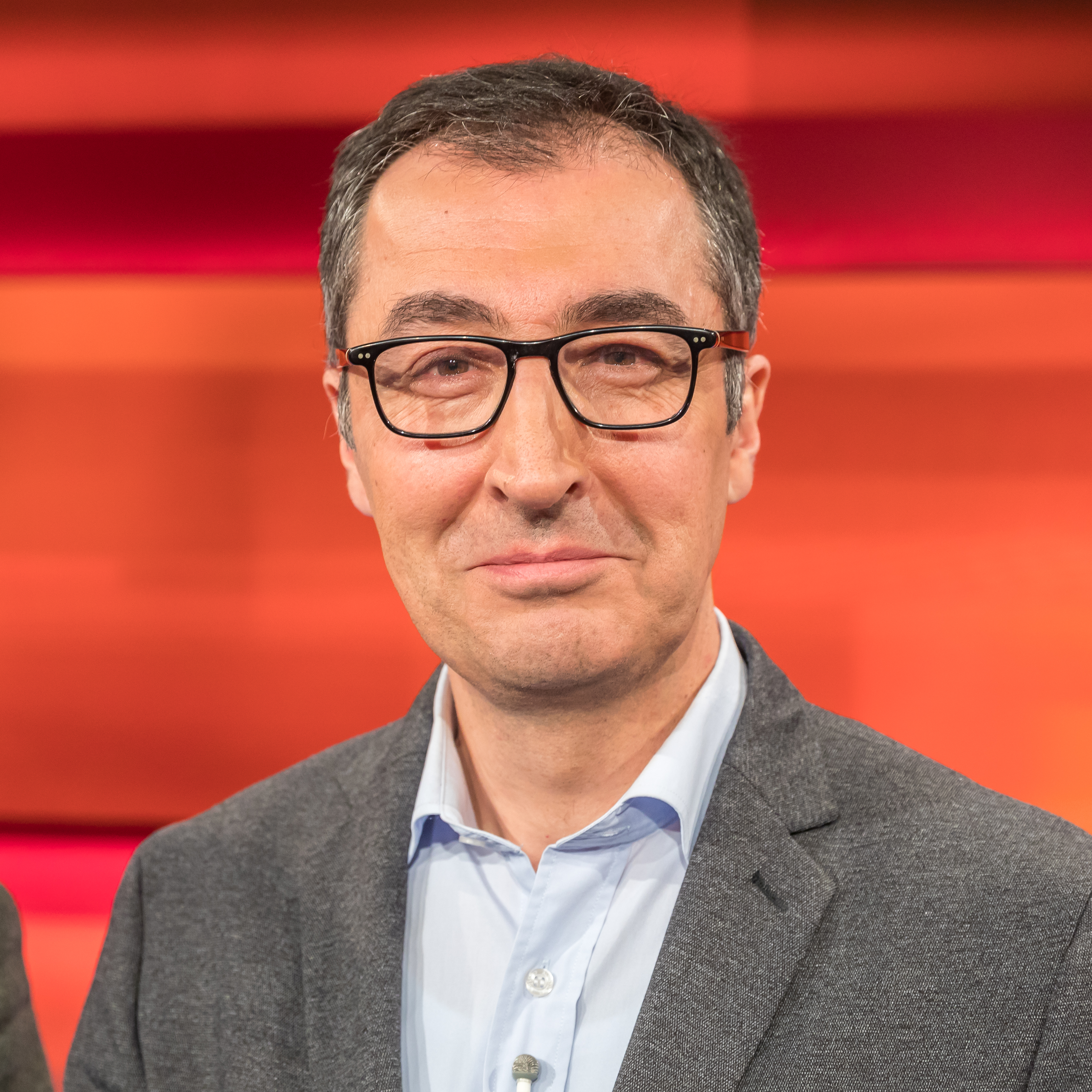
Cem Özdemir

=== German politicians ===
- Cem Özdemir* – German politician, co-chairman of the German Green Party

=== Syrian politicians ===
- Ali Mamlouk – Director of general security of Syria
- Bassam Abdel Majeed – former Syrian interior minister and director of the military police

=== Libyan politicians ===
==== Prime ministers of Libya ====
- Abdul Majid Kabar – Prime Minister of Libya (1957–1960)

=== Iraqi politicians ===
==== Prime ministers of Iraq ====
- Tahir Yahya – prime minister of Iraq
- Hikmat Sulayman – prime minister of Iraq

=== Tunisian politicians ===
- Rashid al-Shakir Sahib al-Taba'a – Tunisian politician

==== Prime ministers of Tunisia ====
- Khaireddin al Tunusy – Prime Minister of Tunisia 1873–1877

=== Egyptian politicians ===
- Aziz Ali al-Misri – Egyptian chief of staff and politician
- Khaled Mohieddin – Egyptian politician
- Aziz Pasha Abaza - Egyptian poet and governor

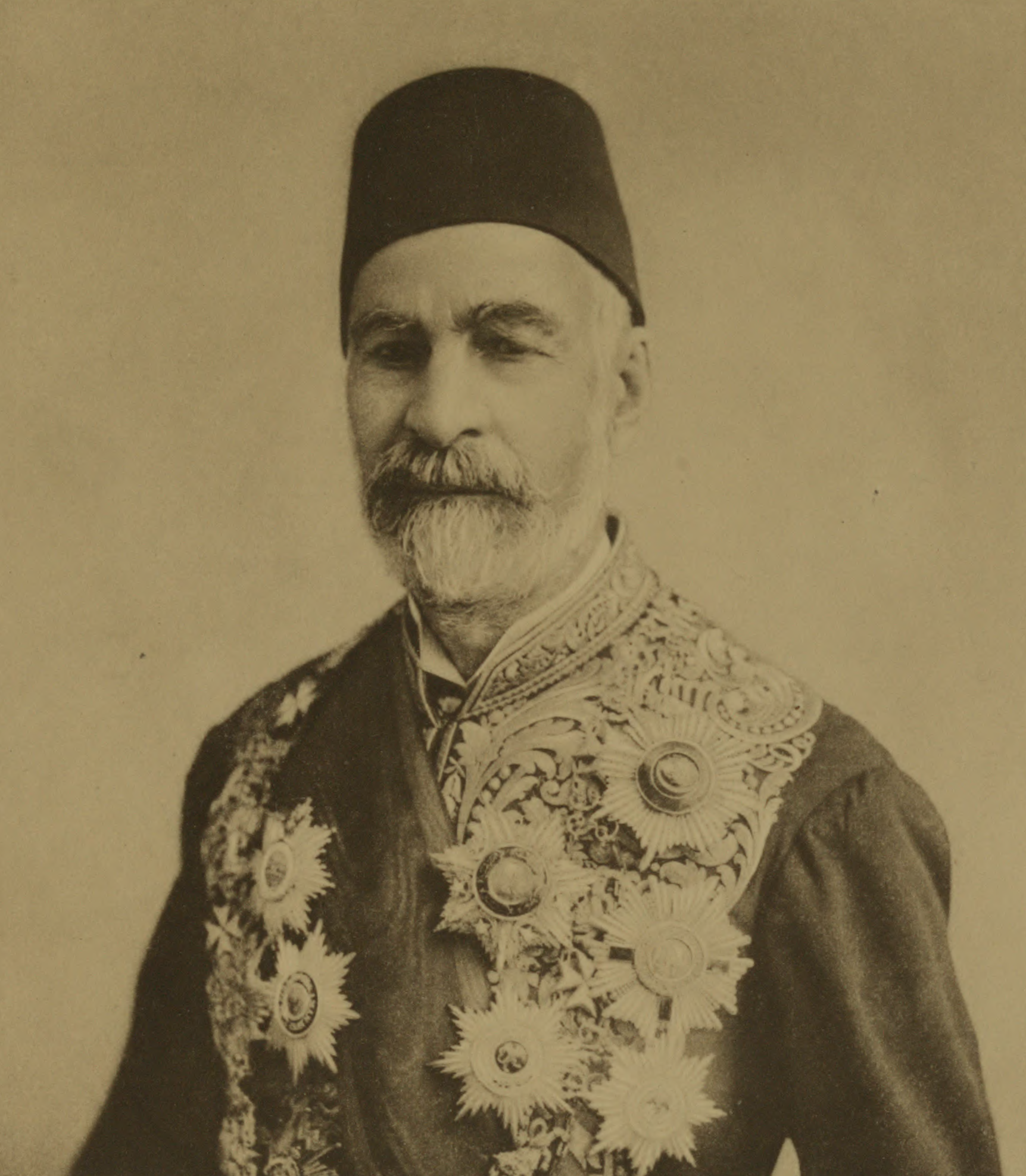
Riyad Pasha

==== Prime ministers of Egypt ====
- Ali Mahir Pasha – Prime Minister of Egypt
- Mahmoud Fawzi – Prime Minister of Egypt
- Ahmad Mahir Pasha – Prime Minister of Egypt
- Riyad Pasha – Prime Minister of Egypt

=== Turkish politicians ===
- Abdüllatif Şener – Former Finance Minister in the 54th cabinet of the Turkish Government
- Ali Kemal** – journalist-politician who was killed during the Turkish War of Independence.
- Deniz Baykal – politician who was a long–time leader of the Republican People's Party (CHP) in Turkey.
- Önder Sav – Turkish lawyer and politician

==== Presidents and prime ministers of Turkey ====
- Ahmet Necdet Sezer – 10th president of Turkey
- Necmettin Erbakan** – politician, engineer and academic who was the Prime Minister of Turkey from 1996 to 1997 as mandated by the constitution.

==== Grand viziers of the Ottoman Empire ====
- Cenaze Hasan Pasha – Short–term Ottoman grand vizier in 1789. His epithet Cenaze (or Meyyit) means "corpse" because he was ill when appointed to the post.
- Koca Dervish Mehmed Pasha – Ottoman military officer and statesman from Circassia. He was made Kapudan Pasha (Grand Admiral) in 1652 and promoted to Grand Vizier on 21 March 1653. He held the position until 28 October 1654.
- Çerkes Mehmed Pasha – Served as Grand Vizier of the Ottoman Empire from 1624 to 1625.
- Salih Hulusi Pasha – was one of the last Grand Viziers of the Ottoman Empire, under the reign of the last Ottoman Sultan Mehmed VI, between 8 March 1920 and 2 April 1920.

==== Ottoman governors ====
- Abdullah Pasha – the Ottoman governor (wali) of Sidon Eyalet. During his reign, all of Palestine and the Syrian coastline came under his jurisdiction.
- Çerkes Osman Pasha – served as the wali (governor) of the Sidon and Damascus eyalets (provinces) in the early 18th century.
- Farrukh Pasha – Ottoman governor of Nablus and Jerusalem in the early 17th century, and founder of the Farrukh dynasty, which held the governorship of Nablus and other posts for much of the 17th century.
- Rıza Tevfik Bey (Rıza Tevfik Bölükbaşı after the Turkish Surname Law of 1934; 1869 – 31 December 1949) was an Ottoman and later Turkishphilosopher, poet, politician of liberal signature. His father was an Albanian, while his mother was a Circassian.

=== Heads of the federal subjects of Russia ===
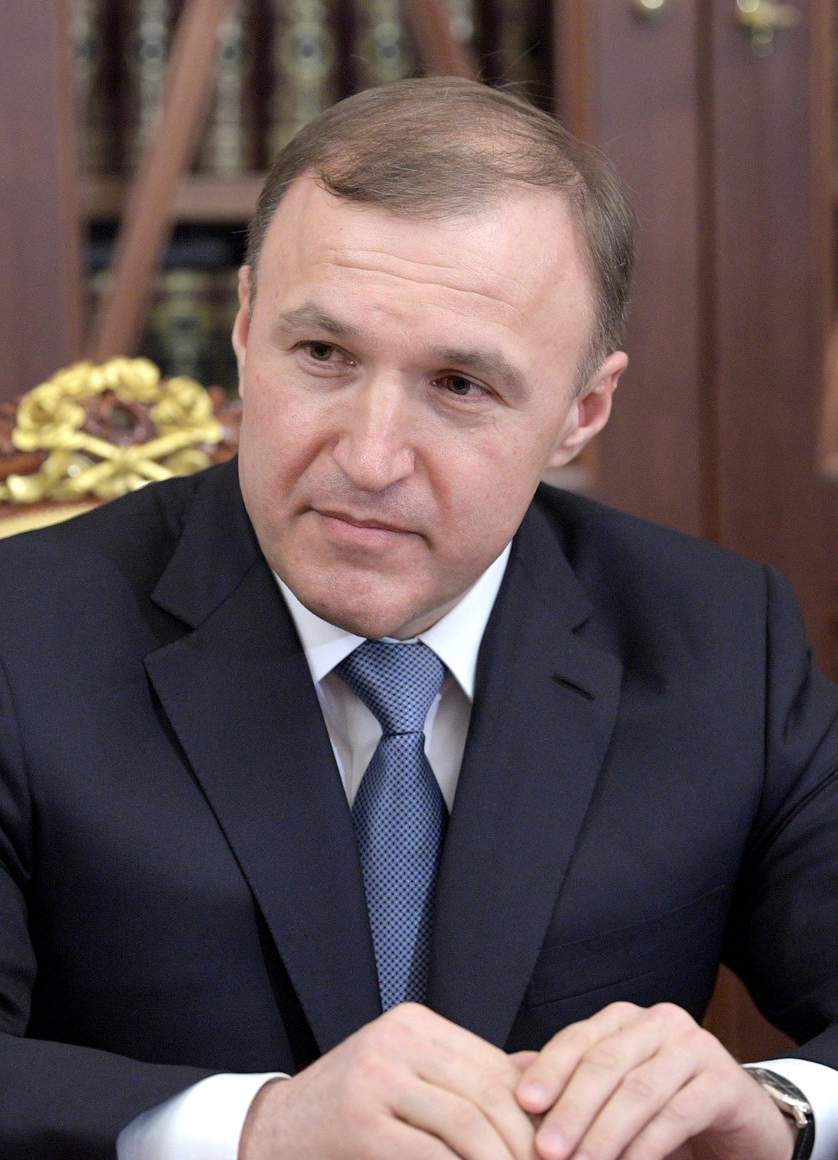
Murat Kumpilov

==== Presidents of Adygea ====
- Aslan Dzharimov – The 1st President of the Republic of Adygea
- Hazret Sovmen – The 2nd President of the Adygea
- Aslan Tkhakushinov – The 3rd President Adygea
- Murat Kumpilov – The 4th President Adygea

==== Presidents of Kabardino–Balkaria ====
- Valery Kokov – The 1st President of Kabardino-Balkaria
- Arsen Kanokov – The 2nd President of Kabardino-Balkaria

==== Krasnodar Krai ====
- Murat Akhedzhak – Deputy Head of Administration of Krasnodar Krai in the 2002–2010.

== Economists ==
- Ungku Abdul Aziz* – Malaysian economist and lecturer
- Zeti Akhtar Aziz* – Governor of Bank Negara Malaysia, Malaysia's Central Bank

== Nobility ==
=== Sultans of the Ottoman Empire with Circassian mothers ===
- Abdul Hamid II** – reigned as the 34th Sultan of the Ottoman Empire – the last Sultan to exert effective control over the fracturing state
- Mehmed V** – reigned as the 35th and penultimate Ottoman Sultan
- Mehmed VI** – the 36th and last Sultan of the Ottoman Empire

=== Shahs of the Safavid Empire with Circassian mothers ===
- Shah Suleiman I ** – the eight Shah of Safavid Persia
- Shah Abbas II ** – the seventh Shah of Safavid Persia
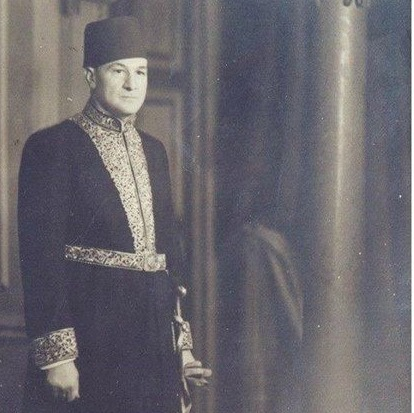
  Aziz Pasha Abaza

=== Other nobility ===
- Maria Temryukovna – Wife of the Russian Tsar Ivan the Terrible
- Bidar Kadın – fourth wife of Sultan Abdul Hamid II of the Ottoman Empire.
- Ecaterina Cercheza second wife of Moldavian prince Vasile Lupu
- Sultana Melek Tourhan was the wife of Sultan Hussein Kamel of Egypt.
- Princess Sana Asem – Jordanian princess
- Dina bint 'Abdu'l-Hamid** – former Queen of Jordan as the first wife of King Hussein
- Nakihat Khanum – Safavid noble
- Anna Khanum – Safavid noble
- Bedrifelek Kadın – second wife and chief consort of Sultan Abdul Hamid II of the Ottoman Empire
- Abaza family - Egypt's largest aristocratic family of maternal Abazin Circassian origin.
- Tariq bin Taimur Al Said - was a member of the Omani royal family
- Hussein bin Ali, King of Hejaz

== Scholars ==
- Şevket Pamuk – chair of Contemporary Turkish Studies at the European Institute, London School of Economics and Political Science.

== Artists ==
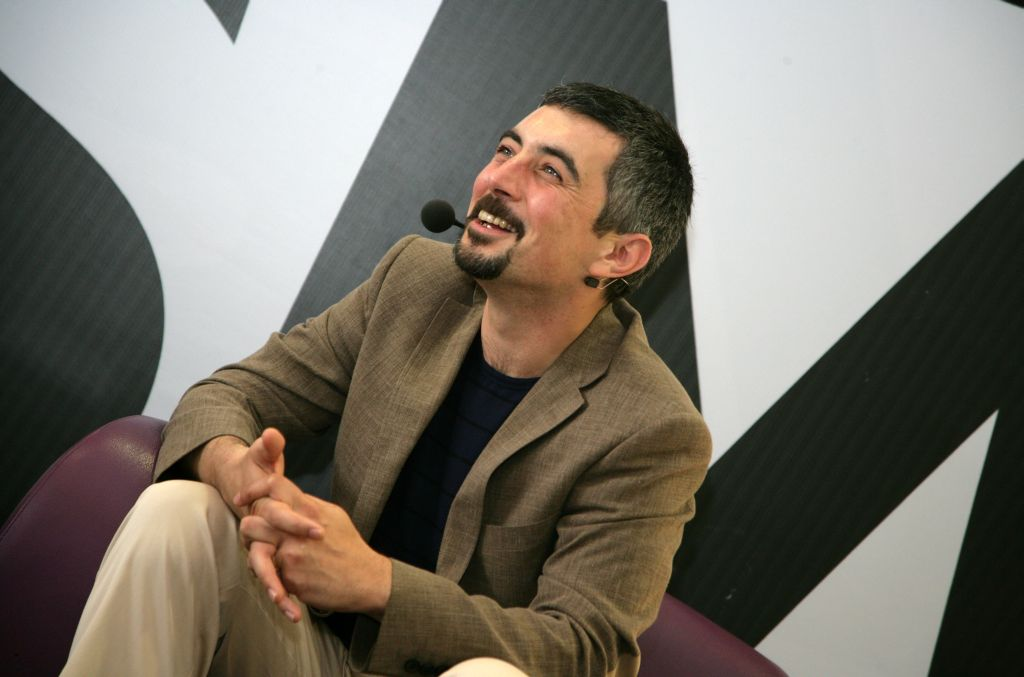
Ali İhsan Varol

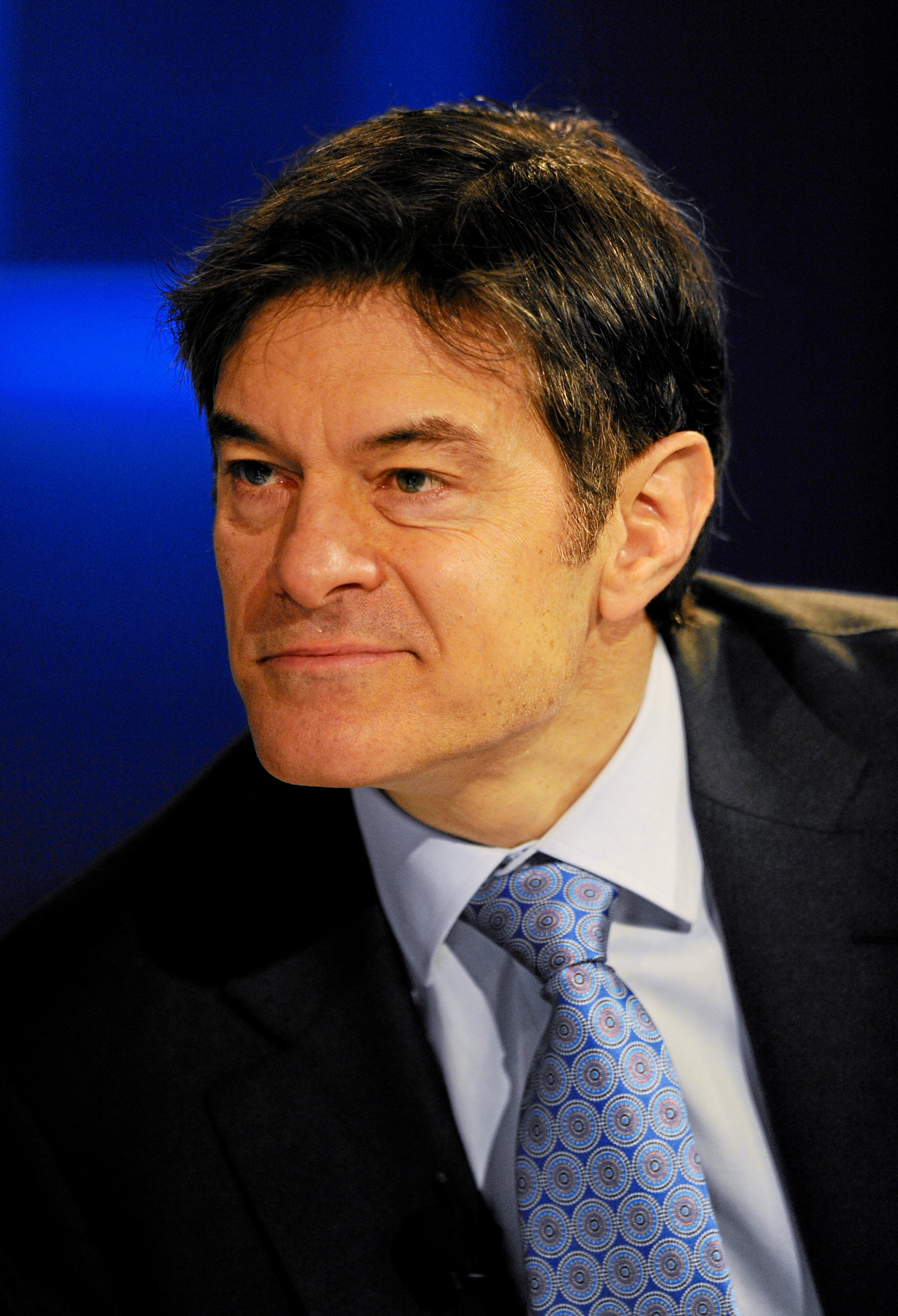
Mehmet Oz

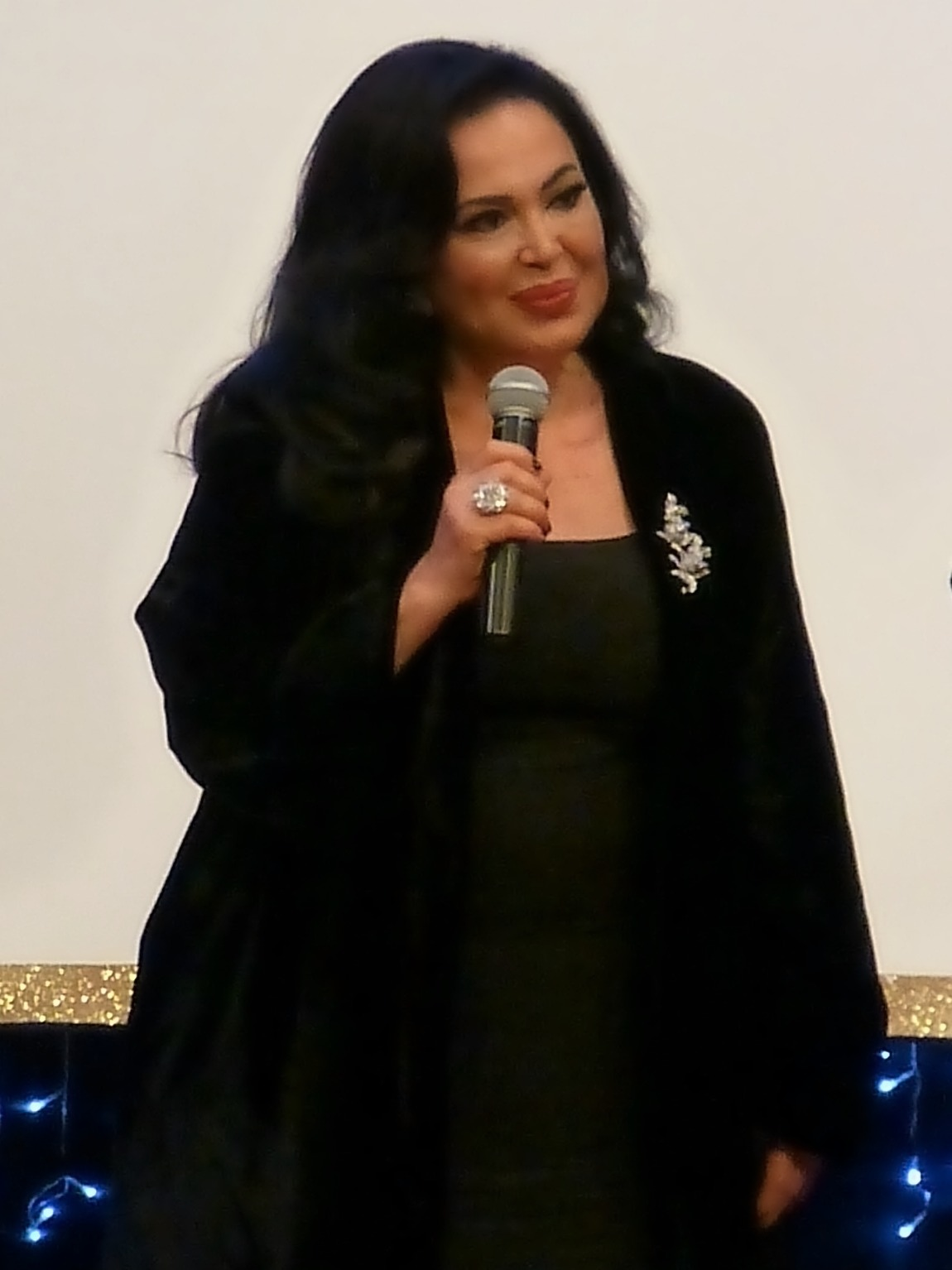
Türkan Şoray

=== Film, TV, and stage ===
- Asuman Krause – actress, singer, model and TV presenter who was crowned Miss Turkey in 1998
- Rushdy Abaza – Egyptian actor. He was a member of the Abazin Abaza family, Egypt's largest Circassian clan. He was considered one of the most charming actors in the Egyptian film industry. He died of brain cancer at the age of 53.
- Ali İhsan Varol – TV show presenter, producer and actor
- Mert Fırat – actor and screenwriter
- Hussein Fahmy – Egyptian actor
- Mervat Amin – Egyptian actress
- Najdat Anzour – Syrian television and film director.
- Ludmilla Tchérina – internationally famous ballet dancer, actress, artist and sculptor who is a member of a royal family.
- Mehmet Aslantuğ – actor, director, producer, and screenwriter. He has received a Golden Boll Award, a Golden Objective Award, three Golden Orange Awards, and four Golden Butterfly Awards.
- Seda Alkor – actress, beauty pageant titleholder, painter and singer
- Mimi Chakib–an Egyptian actress who appeared in some 15 films mostly in the 1940s and 1950s
- Sinem Ünsal – Turkish actress
- Mehmet Oz** – American surgeon who hosts the TV program "The Dr.Oz show"
- Damla Sönmez – Theatre, cinema and TV actress
- Elçin Sangu – actress known for her role in "Kiralık Aşk".
- Natalia Azoqa – Contestant on "Survivor: David vs. Goliath."
- Vladimir Baragun – opera singer, composer, and cultural icon of Circassian music.
- Filiz Akın* – actress, writer and TV presenter. Known as Yeşilçam Turkish cinema's "noble, modern, urban and elegant face", Filiz Akın won a huge fan base in Turkey.
- Neslihan Atagül – actress best known for her role in Kara Sevda (2015–2017), one of the most successful Turkish series, sold to more than 110 countries and the only winner of the International Emmy Award in 2017.
- İrem Sak – actress and singer
- Ezel Akay – film actor, film director and film producer
- Sezgi Sena Akay – actress, former professional volleyball player, presenter, and model who was crowned Best Model of the World 2012.
- Deniz Akkaya – top model, presenter, fashion editor and disc jockey, entrepreneur, businesswoman, and actress who won Best Model of Turkey 1997. As the top–earning model in Turkey in the early 2000s, Deniz Akkaya is considered to be one of the most leading models in Turkish fashion history, and one of the most beautiful women of the country.
- Kanbolat Görkem Arslan – actor
- Günseli Başar – beauty contestant and columnist who was crowned Miss Turkey 1951 and Miss Europe 1952.
- Orhan Boran – radio/TV host and actor. He was also widely known for his laudable usage of the Turkish language.
- Begüm Birgören – actress.
- Sanem Çelik – actress, artist and dancer.
- Sadi Celil Cengiz – actor.
- Meltem Cumbul – actress.
- Keriman Halis Ece – beauty pageant titleholder, pianist, and fashion model who won the Miss Turkey 1932 title. She was also crowned Miss Universe 1932 in Spa, Belgium and thus became Turkey's first Miss Universe.
- Türkan Şoray – actress
- Ayta Sözeri – Turkish transgender actress and LGBT activist
- Dolunay Soysert – Turkish actress
- Çağla Şıkel – is a Turkish ballet, model, actress and TV presenter.
- Nevra Serezli – Turkish actress
- Leyla Sayar** – Turkish actress
- Tan Sağtürk – Turkish actor
- Liya Akhedzhakova* – Russian actress

=== Musicians and painters ===
- Astemir Apanasov – singer
- Aleyna Tilki - Turkish singer and songwriter
- Yuri Temirkanov – Russian music director and chief conductor of the Saint Petersburg Philharmonic since 1988
- Zamudin Guchev – craftsman and musician
- Aslan Tlebzu – Russian folk musician
- Sati Kazanova – Russian singer
- Emanne Beasha- Jordanian/American singer
- Hadise – singer
- Zaur Tutov – singer
- Mihail Chemiakin – Famous painter, stage designer, sculptor and publisher
- Avni Arbaş – painter
- Aydilge – writer, poet and singer–songwriter who is famous for her beauty and voice
- Nuri Bilge Ceylan – photographer, cinematographer, screenwriter and actor and film director

== See also ==
- Circassians
