= Circassians in Iran =

Персым ис Адыгэхэр چرکس‌های ایران

Total population
- Roughly estimated 50,000; Precise population unknown due to heavy assimilation and lack of censuses based on ethnicity. Second largest Caucasus-derived group in the nation.

Regions with significant populations
- Tehran, Gilan province, Mazandaran province, Rasht, East Azerbaijan province, Fars province, Isfahan, Aspas

Languages
- Mainly Persian, as well as Circassian in small amounts

Religion
- Islam

The Circassians in Iran (Note: Circassian: Персым ис Адыгэхэр, Persym is Adygekher; Persian: چرکس‌های ایران, romanized: Cerkeshâye Irân) are an ethnic minority in Iran. Circassians in Iran differ somewhat from other Circassian diasporas, in that most in the former stem from the Safavid and Qajar era, although a number migrated as muhajirs in the late 19th century as well. The Circassians in Iran were very influential during periods in the last few centuries. The vast majority of them have assimilated to speak the Persian language, and no significant number speak their native Circassian languages anymore. Once a very large minority in Iran, nowadays due to being heavily assimilated over the course of time and the lack of censuses based on ethnicity, population estimates vary significantly. They are, however, after the Georgians, known to be the largest Caucasus-derived group in the nation.

In Persian, the word Cherkes (چرکس /tʃeɾˈkes/) is sometimes applied generally to Caucasian peoples living beyond Derbent in Dagestan, which was the northernmost principal city of Iran prior to its ceding to Russia in the first half of the 19th century following the Treaty of Gulistan.

== History ==
Circassians in Iran have a long history. To a certain good extent, they shared the same role as their brethren who lived in neighbouring Ottoman Turkey; many were importees, deportees, slaves, but also made up many of the notable noble families in the empire, while many others were kingmakers, military commanders, soldiers, craftsmen, peasants, while they also composed many of the kings' wives and women in the harem. Under the various kings of the Safavid and Qajar dynasty, many Circassians would eventually happen to live in Iran.

=== Safavids ===
The first Circassian presence in Iran dates to the early Safavid era, during which Shaykh Junayd raided various regions of Circassia and carried back prisoners. From the time of king (shah) Tahmasp I (r. 1524–1576), the Circassians started to play an important role in Iranian society, and began to appear as a large ethnic group in the successive empires based in Iran.

In order to make a counterbalance to the tribal, ethnic, and favoured interests, the Qizilbash gave which make a system imbalanced, Tahmasp I had already been making the first steps of creating a new layer in Iranian society. The kings before Tahmasp and he himself often found themselves incapable of ruling effectively due to the extremely strong influence the Qizilbash expressed in all spheres of the empire. The Qizilbash had formed the backbone of the Safaviyya from the earliest days, and they had always provided substantial military as well, on which the Safavids relied for a long period of time. In order to break this system, a counterbalance was needed, and a new layer in society was the medium through which this could be reached. This new layer in society, was called the "third force", as they were a new ethnic class, or "force", alongside the Turkomans and Persians. This new layer, initiated by Tahmasp I, would be composed of many hundreds of thousands of Christian and pagan Caucasian, mostly ethnically Circassian and Georgian, deportees, importees, slaves, and migrants. This new society layer was to be eventually fully accomplished and implemented by king Abbas I (r. 1588–1629). Out of this new layer, a new military force was established as well; a force that would directly contest the hegemony of the Qizilbash everywhere in the empire, replace them from all their positions, thereby firmly securing the kings' grip over the kingdom. These gholams, or "military slaves", were part of this newly created layer in society. The gholam slave system, although initiated by Tahmasp I, was perfectioned and fully implemented by king Abbas I, and its rank and file were drawn from these massive amounts of ethnic Circassians, Georgians, Armenians and other peoples of the Caucasus, such as Lezgins. Eventually, these large amounts of Circassians and other Caucasians, only loyal to the shah, replaced the Qizilbash and vied through the system with them for political hegemony and supremacy, and were to be victorious, although sometimes they would vy against each other as well.

Circassians made up a good bulk of these elite armies (the so-called gholams), and played therefore a pivotal role. This elite [slave system] army was similar to the Janissaries of neighbouring Ottoman Turkey, in its implementation and formation. The ones in the armies received, after advanced education, conversion to Islam, and upbringing by Muslim families, the best military training and equipment, and were the strongest force and class of the empire. Other large amounts of Circassians were, like the Georgians, employed and deployed in all other possible aspects and positions that the empires offered, such as the harem, civil administration, military administration, peasantry, and crafts, amongst others, while other large numbers were initially settled in various regions in mainland Iran, including Gilan, Mazandaran, and Fars.

According to Thomas Herbert, who was in Safavid Iran in the first half of the 17th century, Aspas was inhabited by some 40,000 transplanted Christian Circassians and Georgians. By the time of king Suleiman I's reign (r. 1666–1694), an estimated 20,000 Circassians, Dagestanis, and Georgians were living in the Safavid capital of Isfahan alone.

Many of the shahs, princes, and princesses descended from noble Circassian lines. Many of the Safavid nobility at the court were Circassian. In fact, the Safavids' heavily mixed ancestry includes several Circassian lines. King Abbas II (r. 1642–1666) and Shah Suleiman I (r. 1666–1694) are just some of the examples amongst the highest nobility that were born by Circassian mothers.

=== Qajars ===
Following the mass expulsion of the native Circassians of the Northwest Caucasus in 1864 mainly towards the Ottoman Empire, some also fled to neighboring Qajar Iran, which bordered the Ottoman Empire and Imperial Russia. In Iran, the government followed an assimilation policy, starting the gradual absorption of the Caucasian refugees into the population. Some of these deportees from after 1864 rose to various high ranks such as in the Persian Cossack Brigade, where every member of the army was either Circassian or any other type of ethnos from the Caucasus.

== Modern day ==
Despite heavy assimilation over the centuries, Circassian settlements have lasted into the 20th century. However, the Circassian languages, once widely used by the large Circassian minority, has no significant number of speakers in Iran anymore. After the Georgians, the Circassians are the second largest Caucasus-derived group in Iran, comprising significant numbers.

== Notables ==
Notable Iranians of either partial or full Circassian descent include:

- Fawzia Fuad, Empress consort of Iran (1941–1948).
- Princess Shahnaz of Iran
- Princess Zahra Mahnaz Zahedi
- Prince Keykhosrow Jahanbani
- Princess Fawzia Jahanbani
- Suleiman I of Persia
- Teresia Sampsonia
- Yusuf Agha
- Pari Khan Khanum
- Sultan-Agha Khanum
- Abbas II of Persia
- Shamkhal Sultan
- Nakihat Khanum
- Kaykhosrow Khan Cherkes
- Qazāq Khan Cherkes, governor of Shirvan, commander of the Qizilbash (Karamanlu and Ḵeneslū divisions)
- Farhad Beg Cherkes
- Khvajeh Mohammad Safavi
- Moḥammad-Bāqer Ṣafī Mīrzā
- Ūzūn Behbūd Beg
- Suleiman Mirza (son of Tahmasp I)
- Safi of Persia
- Anna Khanum
- Najafqoli Khan Cherkes
- Fereydun Khan Cherkes

== See also ==
- Ethnicities in Iran
- Circassians in Turkey
- Circassians in Iraq
- Circassians in Syria
