= Erivan Province =

Erivan Province may refer to:

- Erivan Province (Safavid Iran) (1502–1736), a province of the Safavid dynasty of Iran centered on the modern country of Armenia
- Erivan Khanate (1747–1828), a province of the Afsharid, Zand and Qajar dynasties of Iran centered on the modern country of Armenia
- Erivan Governorate (1850–1917), a province of the Russian Empire centered on the modern country of Armenia
