= Hedayat-Allah Khan =

- Ruler of Gilan
- Reign: March 1753–1786
- Predecessor: Agha Hady Shafti
- Successor: Soleyman Khan Qajar (Qajar rule)
- Died: 1786; Gilan
- Father: Agha Jamal Fumani
- Religion: Shia Islam

Hedayat-Allah Khan (also spelled Hedayatollah Khan; Persian: هدایت‌الله خان) was a Gilaki prince, who was the semi-independent ruler of Gilan from 1753 to 1786.

== Background ==
Hedayat-Allah was the son of Agha Jamal Fumani, a tribal chieftain from Fuman who was descended from the Dubbaj clan, which ruled Gilan in the late 15th-early 16th century, and claimed descent from the pre-Islamic Sasanian Empire and the biblical prophet Isaac. In 1749, two years after the death of the Iranian emperor Nader Shah (r. 1736–1747), Agha Jamal Fumani, along with a certain Agha Safi, seized Gilan.

During the war between the Zand dynasty and the Qajars, the Qajar chieftain of the Qoyunlu branch, Mohammad Hasan Khan Qajar, made Gilan submit to his rule and in 1752 married the daughter of Agha Jamal Fumani. However, on November 6, 1752, Agha Jamal Fumani was killed in Shaft by Agha Hady Shafti, who, with the aid of Mirza Zaki, who governed Gaskar, controlled the province. However, his rule was short-lived—4 months later, Agha Hady Shafti was seized and executed in an unexpected attack by Mohammad Hasan Khan Qajar, who appointed Hedayat-Allah as governor of Gilan.

== Reign ==
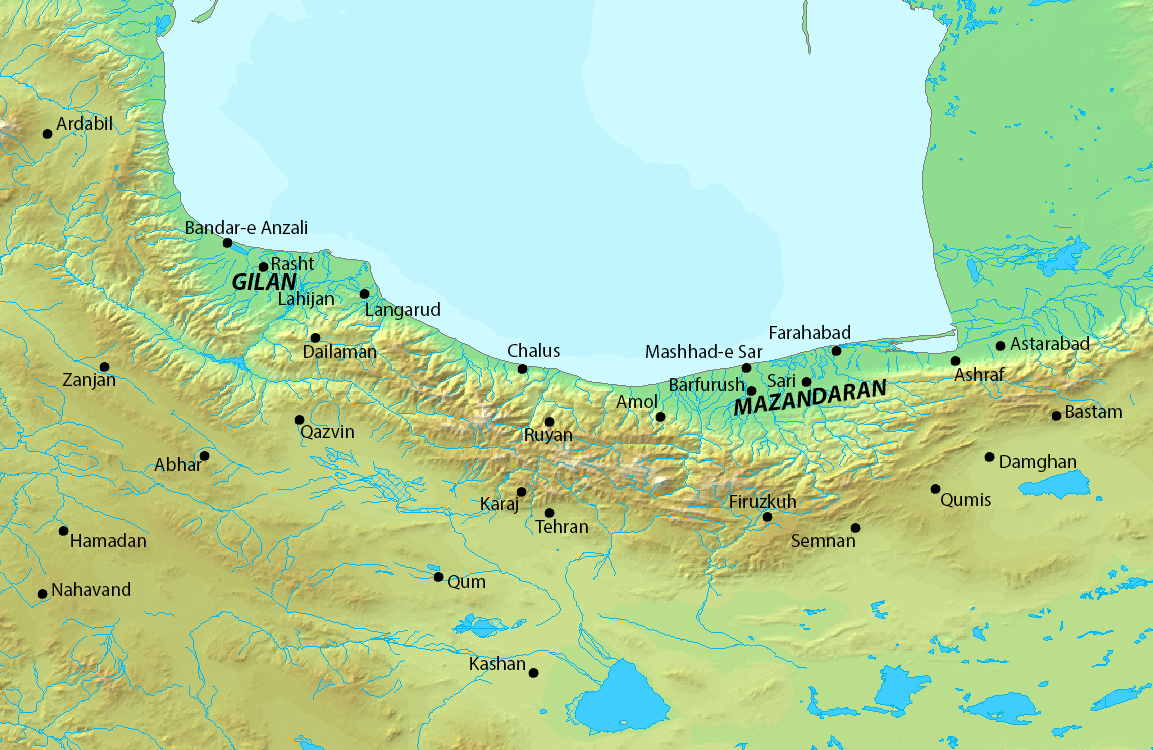
Map of northern Iran.

When the Zand ruler Karim Khan Zand (r. 1751–1779) was conquering Iran in 1760, he had Hedayat-Allah replaced with a close associate of his. However, whilst Karim Khan was on an expedition in Azerbaijan, Hedayat-Allah returned to Gilan and re-established his rule in the province. Karim Khan then shortly had him apprehended and penalized him by demanding 12,000 tomans as payment. He then appointed his cousin Nazar Ali Khan as the governor of the province, but later altered his stratagem and in 1767 restored Hedayat-Allah as the ruler of Gilan under Zand suzerainty. Furthermore, he also arranged the marriage between Hedayat-Allah's sister and his son Abol-Fath Khan Zand.

In 1782 Agha Mohammad Khan invaded Gilan, Hedayat-Allah had changed his allegiance to the Zand dynasty. Hedayat-Allah then sent two diplomats, Mirza Sadeq and Agha Sadeq Lahiji, to Agha Mohammad to make peace. As a precaution he went to Shirvan. The diplomats were unable to come to favorable terms with Agha Mohammad Khan, who raided Gilan's capital Rasht and seized its riches.

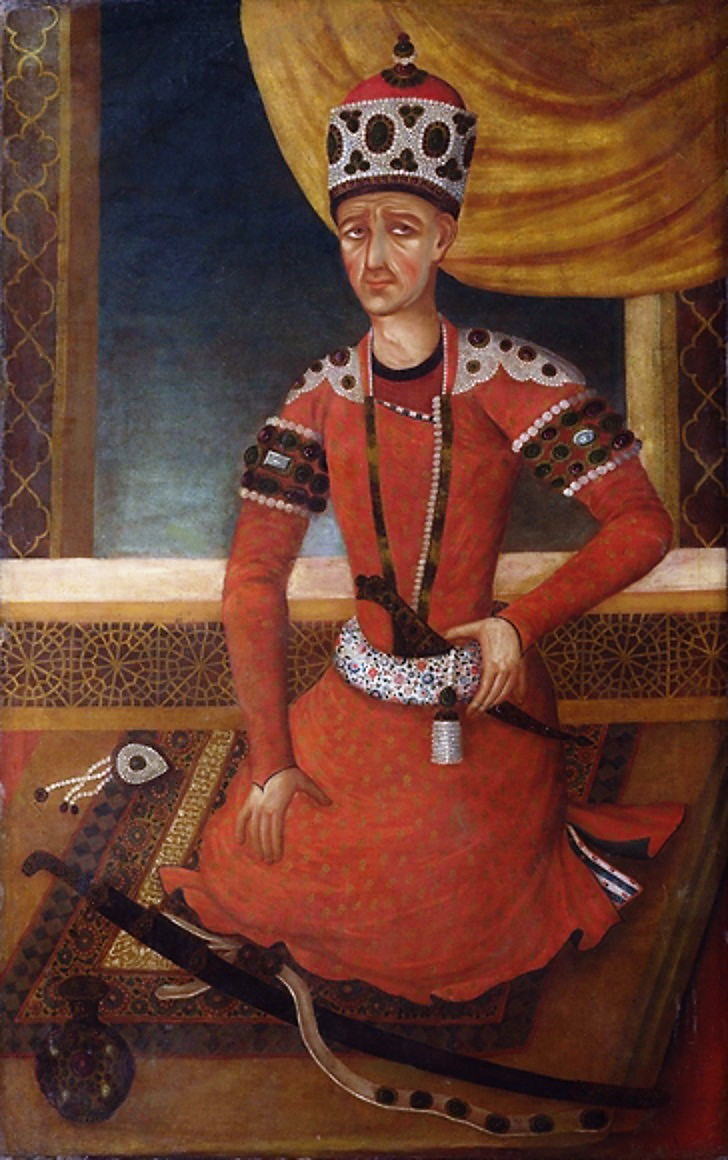
Agha Mohammad Khan Qajar, 19th-century portrait.

Agha Mohammad Khan now had to focus on Gilan because Hedayat-Allah had returned to the province (allegedly with Russian help) since the Qajar invasion of the province in 1782. In Agha Mohammad Khan's eyes, the whole Caspian coast was under threat by Hedayat-Allah and the Russians. Agha Mohammad Khan and his men easily managed to enter Gilan. While he was marching towards Rasht, he was joined by a local ruler named Mehdi Beg Khalatbari and other people.

Furthermore, the Russian consul in Gilan betrayed Hedayat-Allah by providing weapons to Agha Mohammad Khan. Hedayat-Allah once again tried to flee to Shirvan, but was captured by men sent by a local ruler named Agha Ali Shafti (or another local ruler according to some sources), who killed him to avenge the slaughter of his family a few years earlier. Gilan was now completely under Qajar rule. Besides the conquest of Gilan, the second most valuable thing for Agha Mohammad Khan was Hedayat-Allah's treasure.

== Characteristics and policies ==
Gilan flourished under the rule of Hedayat-Allah, who encouraged foreign trade by tempting a substantial amount of Armenians, Russians, Jews, and Indians to Rasht. He preserved an elegant court in Rasht, funded by the silk industry and the sea commerce between Bandar-e Anzali and Astrakhan. Nonetheless, according to the Cambridge History of Iran, "he was treacherous and bloodthirsty, even by the standards of the age, and his eventual overthrow by Mohammad Hasan Khan's son and political heir, Agha Mohammad Khan, passed unmourned."

== Sources ==
- Hambly, Gavin R.G (1991). "Agha Muhammad Khan and the establishment of the Qajar dynasty". The Cambridge History of Iran, Vol. 7: From Nadir Shah to the Islamic Republic. Cambridge: Cambridge University Press. pp. 104–144. ISBN 9780521200950.
- Kasheff, Manouchehr (2001). "GĪLĀN v. History under the Safavids". In Yarshater, Ehsan (ed.). Encyclopædia Iranica. Vol. X/6: Germany VI–Gindaros. London and New York: Routledge & Kegan Paul. pp. 635–642. ISBN 978-0-933273-55-9.
- Langaroudi, Reza Rezazadeh (2001). "GĪLĀN vi. History in the 18th century". In Yarshater, Ehsan (ed.). Encyclopædia Iranica. Vol. X/6: Germany VI–Gindaros. London and New York: Routledge & Kegan Paul. pp. 642–645. ISBN 978-0-933273-55-9.

| Preceded by Agha Hady Shafti | Ruler of Gilan; 1753–1786 | Succeeded by Soleyman Khan Qajar (Qajar rule) |
