= Chokhur-e Sa'd =

Chokhur-e Sa'd may refer to:

- Erivan Province (Safavid Empire), a province of the Safavid dynasty of Iran centered on the modern country of Armenia
- Erivan Khanate, a province of the Afsharid, Zand and Qajar dynasties of Iran centered on the modern country of Armenia
