= Agha Jamal Fumani =

Agha Jamal Fumani (Persian: آقا جمال فومنی), also known as Hajji Jamal Fumani (حاجی جمال فومنی), was a Gilaki tribal chieftain from Fuman, who controlled Gilan from 1749 to 1752.

== Biography ==
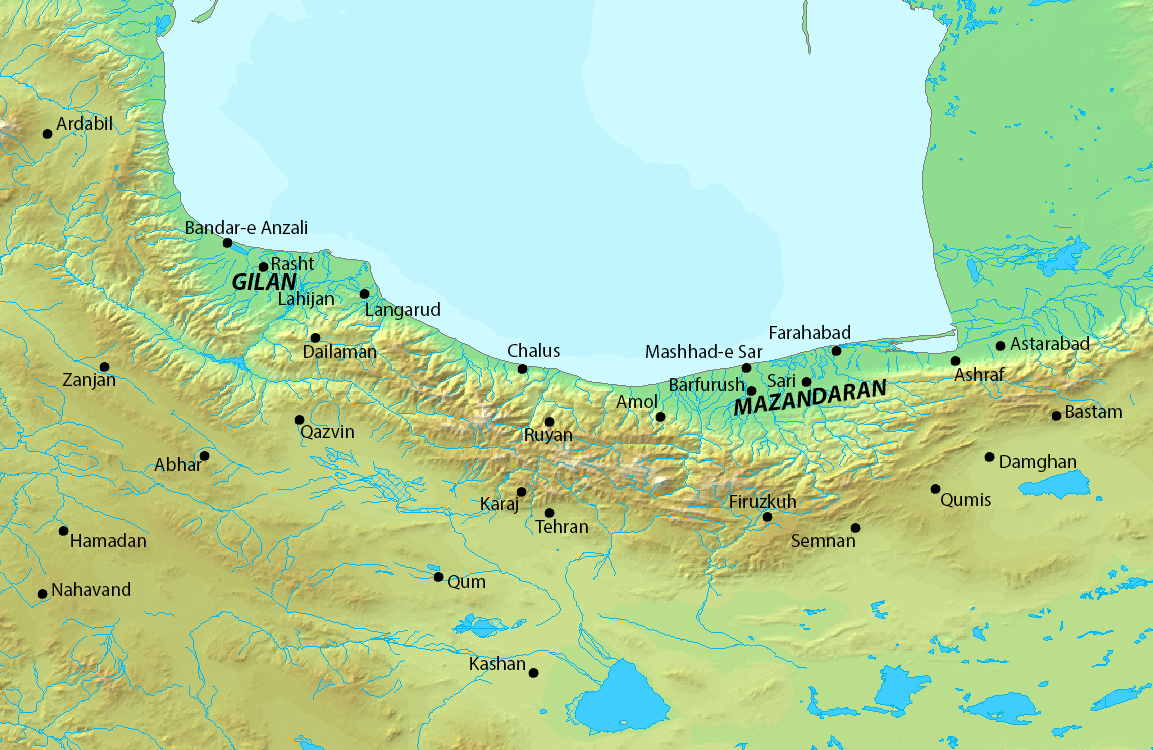
Map of northern Iran.

Agha Jamal Fumani was a native of Fuman—he was the son of Agha Kamal, who governed Gilan during the reign of the Safavid shah Sultan Husayn (r. 1694–1722). Furthermore, Agha Jamal Fumani was descended from the Dubbaj clan, which ruled Gilan in the late 15th-early 16th century, and claimed descent from the pre-Islamic Sasanian Empire and the biblical prophet Isaac. In 1749, two years after the death of the Iranian emperor Nader Shah (r. 1736–1747), Agha Jamal Fumani, along with Agha Safi, seized Gilan.

During the war between the Zand dynasty and the Qajars, the Qajar chieftain of the Qoyunlu branch, Mohammad Hasan Khan Qajar, made Gilan submit to his rule and in 1752 married the daughter of Agha Jamal Fumani. However, on November 6, 1752, Agha Jamal Fumani was killed in Shaft by Agha Hady Shafti, who, with the aid of Mirza Zaki, who governed Gaskar, took control over the province. However, his rule was short-lived—4 months later, Agha Hady Shafti was seized and executed in an unexpected attack by Mohammad Hasan Khan Qajar, who appointed Agha Jamal Fumani's young son Hedayat-Allah Khan as governor of Gilan.

== Sources ==
- Hambly, Gavin R.G (1991). "Agha Muhammad Khan and the establishment of the Qajar dynasty". The Cambridge History of Iran, Vol. 7: From Nadir Shah to the Islamic Republic. Cambridge: Cambridge University Press. pp. 104–144. ISBN 9780521200950.
- Kasheff, Manouchehr (2001). "GĪLĀN v. History under the Safavids". Encyclopaedia Iranica, Vol. X, Fasc. 6. pp. 635–642.
- Langaroudi, Reza Rezazadeh (2001). "GĪLĀN vi. History in the 18th century". Encyclopaedia Iranica, Vol. X, Fasc. 6. pp. 642–645.

Preceded by Afsharid rule	Ruler of Gilan; 1749–1753	Succeeded by Agha Hady Shafti
