= Mohammad-Qoli Khan of Erivan =

Mohammad-Qoli Khan

Governor of Erivan Province (Chokhur-e Sa'd)
- In office 1654–1656
- Preceded by: Kaykhosrow Khan Cherkes
- Succeeded by: Najafqoli Khan Cherkes

Personal details
- Occupation: Official

Military service
- Allegiance: Safavid Iran

Mohammad-Qoli Khan or Mohammad-Qoli Khan b. Laleh Beg (fl. 17th-century), was a Safavid official who served as the governor (beglarbeg) of the Erivan Province (also known as Chokhur-e Sa'd) in 1654–1656, succeeding the Circassian Kaykhosrow Khan Cherkes to this post. According to the modern historian Rudi Matthee, during the "scheming" of incumbent grand vizier Mohammad Beg (1654–1666), by which the latter managed to get rid of his adversaries, Mohammad-Qoli Khan was probably also one of those officials who lost their job.

== Sources ==
- Floor, Willem M. (2008). Titles and Emoluments in Safavid Iran: A Third Manual of Safavid Administration, by Mirza Naqi Nasiri. Washington, DC: Mage Publishers. ISBN 978-1933823232.
- Matthee, Rudi (2012). Persia in Crisis: Safavid Decline and the Fall of Isfahan. I.B.Tauris. ISBN 978-1845117450.

Preceded by Kaykhosrow Khan Cherkes	Governor of Erivan Province (Chokhur-e Sa'd); 1654–1656	Succeeded by Najafqoli Khan Cherkes
