= Kaykhosrow Khan Cherkes =

Safavid governor of Erivan from 1648 to 1653

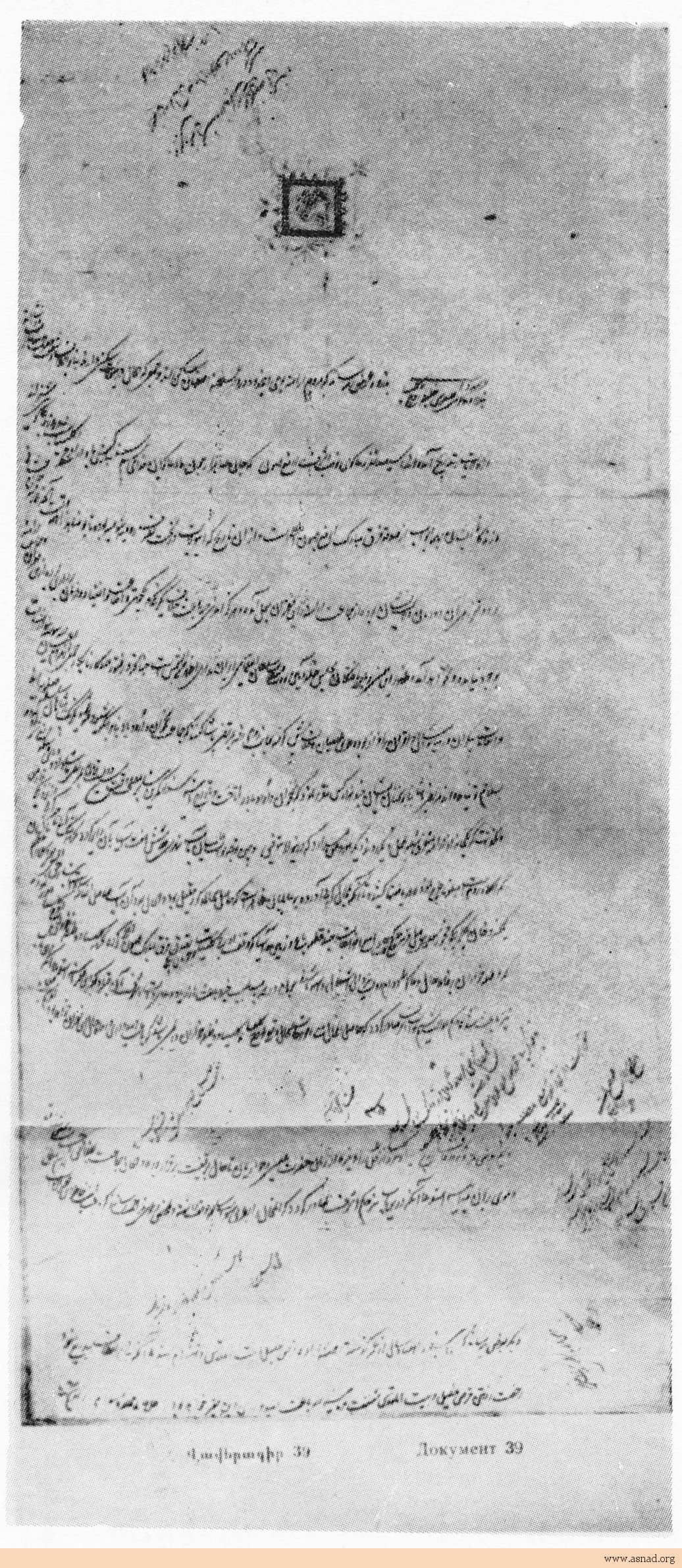
- Petition in Persian by the Armenian patriarch to Shah Abbas II in which governor Kaykhosrow Khan is also mentioned by name. Dated 1650

Governor of Erivan Province
- In office 1648–1653
- Monarch: Abbas II
- Preceded by: Mohammadqoli Beg Khan Chaghatay
- Succeeded by: Mohammad-Qoli Khan

Personal details
- Occupation: Official

Military service
- Allegiance: Safavid Iran

Kaykhosrow Khan Cherkes was an Iranian gholam of Circassian origin, who served as beglerbeg (governor) of the Erivan Province (also known as Chokhur-e Sa'd) from 1648 to 1653 during the reign of Shah Abbas II (r. 1642-1666).

Preceded by Mohammadqoli [Beg] Khan Chaghatay (aka Chaghatay Kotuk Mohammad Khan)	Governor of Erivan Province (Chokhur-e Sa'd); 1648-1653	Succeeded by Mohammad-Qoli Khan
