= Yusuf Khan (Armenian) =

Governor of Shirvan from 1610 to 1624

Governor of Astarabad
- In office 1604
- Monarch: Abbas the Great
- Preceded by: Hoseyn Khan Ziyadoghlu Qajar
- Succeeded by: Fereydun Khan Cherkes

Master of the hunt (mīr shekār-bāshi)
- In office 1609–1610
- Monarch: Abbas the Great
- Preceded by: Ali Beg Ustajlu
- Succeeded by: Farhad Beg Cherkes

Governor of Shamakhi
- In office 1610–?
- Monarch: Abbas the Great
- Preceded by: Zu'l Fiqar Qaramanlu
- Succeeded by: Allahverdi Khan (1704)

Governor of Shirvan
- In office 1610–1624
- Monarch: Abbas the Great
- Preceded by: Zu'l Fiqar Qaramanlu
- Succeeded by: Qazaq Khan Cherkes

Personal details
- Occupation: Official

Military service
- Allegiance: Safavid Iran

Yusuf Khan (Persian: یوسف خان), also spelled Yusof Khan, was a Safavid gholam and official of Armenian origin who was governor of Astarabad (1604), Shamakhi (1610-?), and Shirvan (1610–1624) during the reign of Shah Abbas I (r. 1588–1629). Originally a Christian, Yusuf was first employed in the royal mews, and because of his skill in handling and hunting birds and animals, he was soon given the rank of "master of the hunt" (mīr shekār-bāshi). Thereafter, he became governor of Shirvan and Shamakhi.

When Abbas I decided to marry his granddaughter to Simon II of Kartli (Semayun Khan) in 1624, Yusuf Khan was ordered by Qarachaqay Khan, likewise of Christian Armenian origin and a childhood friend, to host the banquet in the first term of the wedding party.

Yusuf Khan was murdered on the orders of Murav Beg (Giorgi Saakadze), after the latter decided to conspire with the Georgian rebel leaders.

== Sources ==
- Allsen, Thomas (2006). The Royal Hunt in Eurasian History. University of Pennsylvania Press. p. 90. ISBN 978-0812239263.
- Blow, David (2009). Shah Abbas: The Ruthless King Who Became an Iranian Legend. I.B.Tauris. pp. 134, 176. ISBN 978-0857716767.
- Floor, Willem M.; Faghfoory, Mohammad H. (2007). The Dastur Al-moluk: A Safavid State Manual, by Mohammad Rafi' al-Din Ansari. Mazda Publishers. pp. 187–188. ISBN 978-1568591957.
- Floor, Willem M. (2008). Titles and Emoluments in Safavid Iran: A Third Manual of Safavid Administration, by Mirza Naqi Nasiri. Washington, DC: Mage Publishers. pp. 152–153, 278–279, 286. ISBN 978-1933823232.
- Floor, Willem; Herzig, Edmund (2015). Iran and the World in the Safavid Age. I.B.Tauris. p. 484. ISBN 978-1780769905.

Preceded by Hoseyn Khan Ziyadoghlu Qajar	Governor of Astarabad; 1604	Succeeded by Fereydun Khan Cherkes
Preceded by Ali Beg Ustajlu	Master of the hunt (mīr shekār-bāshi); 1609-1610	Succeeded by Farhad Beg Cherkes
Preceded by Zu'l Fiqar Qaramanlu	Governor of Shamakhi; 1610-?	Succeeded by Allahverdi Khan (1704)
Preceded by Zu'l Fiqar Qaramanlu	Governor of Shirvan; 1610-1624	Succeeded by Qazaq Khan Cherkes
