= Safavid Astarabad =

Southeastern province of Safavid Iran

Safavid Astarabad Ostān-e Astarābād
- 1510–1736
- Status: Province of Safavid Iran
- Capital: Astarabad
Succeeded by
Afsharid Iran

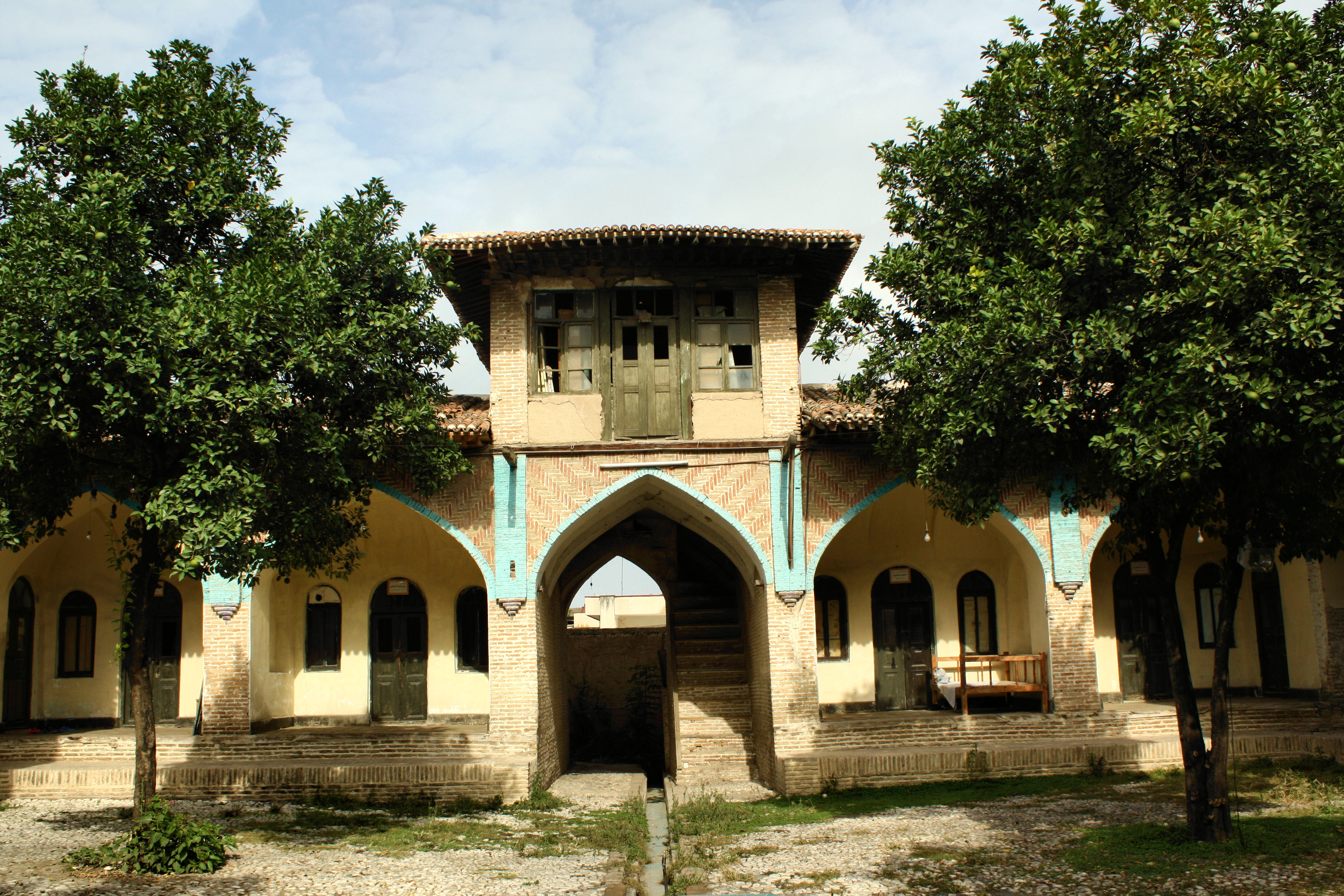
The Emadieh school in the city of Gorgan (Astarabad), created under the Safavids

The province of Astarabad (also called Gorgan and Jorjan; Persian: استان استرآباد, romanized: Ostān-e Astarābād) was a northeastern province of Safavid Iran, located on the southeastern side of the Caspian Sea. It bordered the Atrek River in the north, the Alborz in the south, the Mazandaran province to the west, and Jajarm to the east. The province was under Safavid control from 1510.

By the end of the Safavid era, Astarabad was composed of the following administrative jurisdictions: Gira'i, Goklan, Hajjilar, Jalayer, K.ra-chupi, and Yamut. Each district name was derived from the Turkoman tribe that been enstrusted with it. Some of the Turkoman tribes (such as the Qepchaq) lived to the north of Astarabad, but were still nominal subjects of the Safavids.

In the 1550s and 1560s, theologians and seyyeds from Astarabad and the Mazandaran province established a dominant presence in the Safavid government. These officials managed shrines and held the office of the sadr while also advancing Safavid theological goals. They wrote many works on Islamic law, hagiography and the interpretation of holy texts. Distinguished Astarabadi seyyeds during this period included Mir Mu'min Astarabadi (tutor to Haydar Mirza), Molana Mo'en Astarabadi (vizier of Ibrahim Mirza) and Mir Mohammad Ashraf (plenipotentiary of Shah Tahmasp I during his visits to the Imam Reza shrine in Mashhad).

From 1589 to 1598, the Sa'en-khanis of the Yakka Turkoman tribe assumed control over the province as caretaker governors, due to its lack of efficient Safavid rule. Their hold over the province was ended when Shah Abbas I (r. 1588–1629) marched to Astarabad and pacified the tribes. In order to develop the province and levy taxes, the Safavids continued to attract Turkoman tribes to the province. The authority of the Safavid governor of Astarabad sometimes extended over the province, such as in Damghan and Bastam.

== List of governors ==
This is a list of the known figures who governed the Astarabad province.

Date	Name
?-1514	Khalaf Beg Talesh
1514-?	Pir Gheyb Talesh
?-1522	Zeyn al-Din Soltan Shamlu
1522–1528	Zeynal Khan Shamlu
1527	Shahverdi Beg Ziyad-oghlu Qajar
1528	Occupation by the Khanate of Bukhara
1531	Badr Khan Ustajlu
?-1532	Mohammad Khan Dhu'l-Qadr ibn Kur Shahrokh ibn Ala al-Dowleh
1532	Badr Khan Ustajlu
1532–1537	Sadr al-Din Khan Ustajlu
1537	Occupation by the Khanate of Bukhara
1537–1543	Sadr al-Din Khan Ustajlu ibn Saru Pireh
1548–1550	Shah Ali Soltan Ustajlu
1550	Shahqoli Soltan Ustajlu
1550-?	Shahverdi Beg [Soltan] Kachal Chavoshlu Ustajlu
1550–1555-?	Soltan Amir Gheyb Beg Ustajlu
1558-?	Ebrahim Khan Dhu'l-Qadr
1563-?	Khalil Soltan ibn Shahverdi Soltan Ziyad-oghlu Qajar
1565?	Panah Mohammad Khan Dhu'l-Qadr
1569-?	Sayyed Beg ibn Sayyed Masum Beg
before 1574	Soleyman Khalifeh-ye Shamlu
before 1574	Mohammad Khan Asayesh-oghli
before 1574	Mohammad Khalifeh Dhu'l-Qadr
?-1574	Sayyed Beg ibn Masum Beg Safavi Sheykhavand
1574–1576	Shahqoli Soltan Tati-oghlu Dhu'l-Qadr
1576-?	Mohammad Soltan Dhu'l-Qadr
1577-?	Mirza Ali Soltan Qajar
1581–1588	Mortazaqoli Khan Pornak Torkman
1589	Badr Khan Afshar
1589–1598	(Absence of Safavid control)
1589–1597	Elyar Khan Imur
1587–1588	Mohammad Yar Khan Imur
1588	Qalij Beg Imur
1589	Farhad Khan Qaramanlu
?-1604	Hoseyn Khan Ziyad-oghlu Qajar
1604	Yusof Khan
1605–1620	Fereydun Khan Cherkes
1620–1629	Behbud Khan Cherkes
1629–1639	Khosrow Khan Cherkes
1639–1640	Qazaq Khan Cherkes
1640–1642	Hoseyn Khan ibn Zaman Beg Mazandarani
1642–1648	Mehrab Khan
1650	Allahverdi Beg
1650–1654	Mohammadqoli Khan ibn Siyavosh Khan
1654–1656	Hajji Manuchehr Khan
1656–1664-?	Jamshid Khan
1666	Jafarqoli Khan
1672	Mohammad Khan
?-1692	Pesand Khan
1694–1695	Oghurlu Beg
1695–1697	Ali Khan
1705	Mirza Ahmad
?-1708	Kalb Ali Beg
1708–1709-?	Aslan Khan Daghestani
1711-1717	Rostam Mohammad Khan Sa'dlu
?-1717-?	Fath-Ali Khan Qajar

== Sources ==
- Floor, Willem (2008). Titles and Emoluments in Safavid Iran: A Third Manual of Safavid Administration, by Mirza Naqi Nasiri. Mage Publishers. ISBN 978-1933823232.
- Mitchell, Colin P. (2009). The Practice of Politics in Safavid Iran: Power, Religion and Rhetoric. I.B. Tauris. ISBN 978-0857715883.
