= Aslan Khan Daghestani =

18th-century Safavid official

Governor of Astarabad
- In office 1708 or 1709 – ?
- Preceded by: Kalb' Ali Beg
- Succeeded by: Rostam Mohammad Khan Sa'dlu

Governor of Kuhgiluyeh
- In office 1702–1708
- Preceded by: Mohammad Ali Khan
- Succeeded by: Safiqoli Beg

Personal details
- Children: Mohammad Khan
- Parent: Safi Khan Lezgi (father)
- Relatives: Fath-Ali Khan Daghestani (brother); Hasan-Ali Khan Daghestani (nephew); Lotf-Ali Khan Daghestani (nephew and brother-in-law)

Aslan Khan Daghestani was an early 18th-century Safavid official. Of Lezgian origin, he served as a governor of Kuhgiluyeh (beglarbeg; 1702–1708) and of Astarabad (hakem) during the reign of king Sultan Husayn (1694–1722). He entered office in Astarabad in 1708/09, and already early on in his tenure, the province was threatened by Turkmen incursions aided by rebels from the town of Sayfja. Dismayed by the news, the Safavid government then sent Aslan Khan with 2,000 troops to deal with the enemy.

According to Prof. Rudi Matthee, it is "likely" that he remained in office when his brother Fath-Ali Khan Daghestani served as grand vizier (1716–1720). His son, Mohammad Khan, became governor of Herat in 1708/9.

== Sources ==
- Floor, Willem M. (2008). Titles and Emoluments in Safavid Iran: A Third Manual of Safavid Administration, by Mirza Naqi Nasiri. Washington, DC: Mage Publishers. pp. 153, 225. ISBN 978-1933823232.
- Matthee, Rudi (2012). Persia in Crisis: Safavid Decline and the Fall of Isfahan. I.B.Tauris. ISBN 978-1845117450.

| Preceded by Mohammad Ali Khan | Governor of Kuhgiluyeh; 1702–1708 | Succeeded by Safiqoli Beg |
| Preceded by Kalb' Ali Beg | Governor of Astarabad; 1708/09–? | Succeeded by Rostam Mohammad Khan Sa'dlu |
