= Farhad Beg Cherkes =

Circassian favourite of Safavid shah Abbas I (died 1614)

- فرهاد بیگ چرکس

Mīr Shekār-Bāshi (Master of the hunt)
- In office 1614
- Monarch: Abbas the Great

Personal details
- Died: 1614

Farhad Beg Cherkes (died 1614) was a Circassian favourite at the Safavid court of king (shah) Abbas I (r. 1588–1629). Having risen through the gholam ranks, he enjoyed a high position in the royal court, until he was executed following a court intrigue in 1614.

== Biography ==
Farhad Beg started his career as a regular falconer (qushchi) at the Safavid court, until he was promoted to the office of “master of the hunt” (mīr shekār-bāshi) in 1614. Shortly after, he was suspected of forming a subversive relationship with the crown prince, Mohammad Baqer Mirza, whose mother was one of Abbas' Circassian wives. Based on this suspicion, in the same year, Abbas handed Farhad Beg to the prince, who, to show his fidelity to his father and the king of the empire, gave immediate orders for Farhad Beg Cherkes' execution and the confiscation of his property. At that time, the Royal camp was situated in Karabagh. Shortly after, fearing the crown prince's popularity, king Abbas ordered another Circassian, Behbud Beg, to murder the crown prince.

== Sources ==
- Floor, Willem M.; Faghfoory, Mohammad H. (2007). The Dastur Al-moluk: A Safavid State Manual, by Mohammad Rafi' al-Din Ansari. Mazda Publishers. pp. 187–188. ISBN 978-1568591957.
- Maeda, Hirotake (2006). "The forced migrations and reorganisation of the regional order in the Caucasus by Safavid Iran: Preconditions and developments described by Fazli Khuzani". In Ieda, Osamu; Uyama, Tomohiko (eds.). Reconstruction and interaction of Slavic Eurasia and its neighbouring worlds (PDF). Slavic Eurasian Studies, No.10. Sapporo: Slavic Research Centre, Hokkaido University. p. 253. ISBN 4938637391.
- Manz, Beatrice; Haneda, Masashi (1990). "ČARKAS". Encyclopaedia Iranica, Vol. IV, Fasc. 7. pp. 816–819.

Preceded by Yusuf Khan (Armenian)	Master of the hunt (mīr shekār-bāshi); 1614	Succeeded by Yusuf Agha (Circassian)
