= Sultan-Agha Khanum =

16th-century consort in Safavid Iran

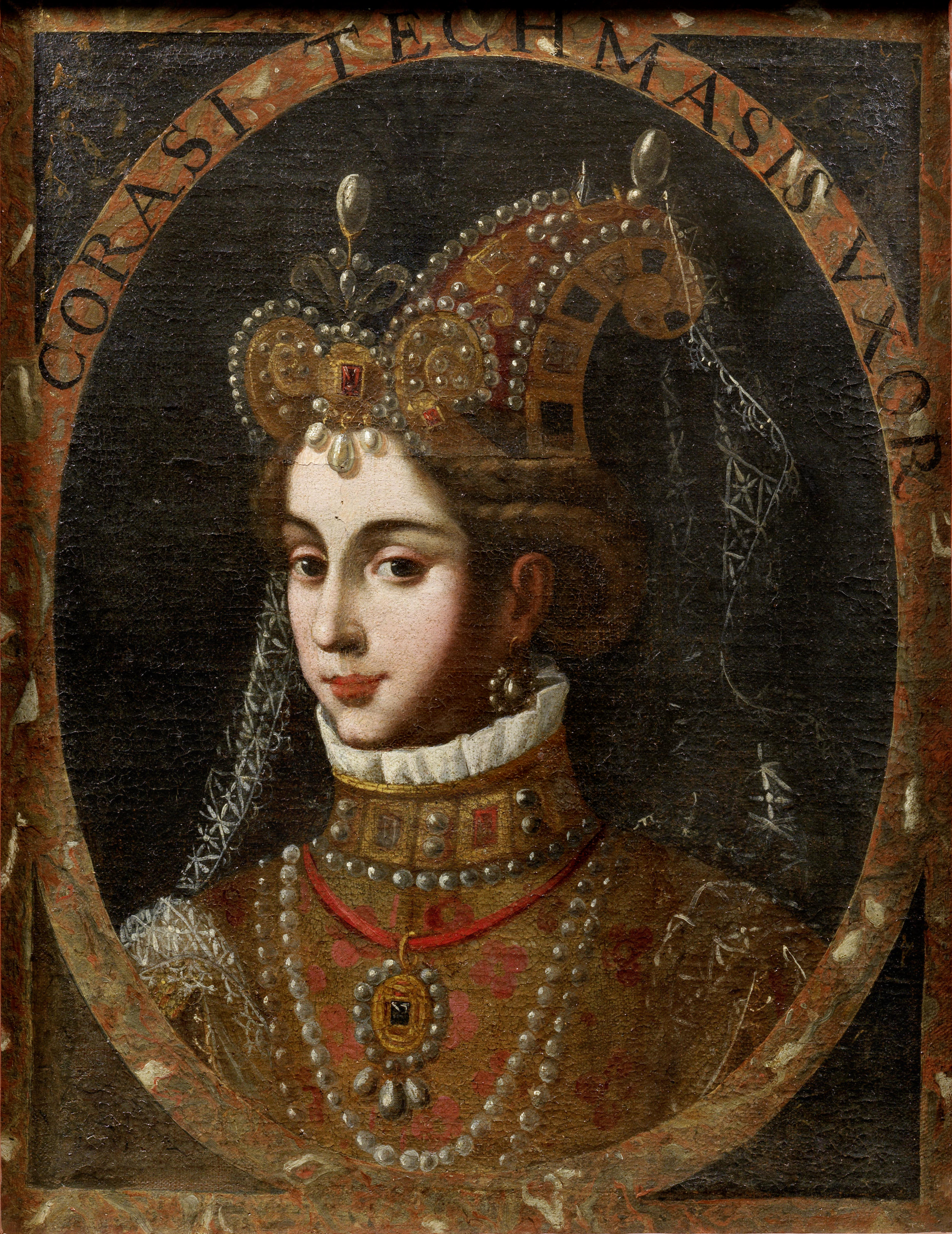
- Portrait of Sultan-Agha Khanum. 17th-century Italian painting based on the engraving of 1596 by Johann Theodor de Bry.

Queen consort of Safavid Shah
- Tenure: c. 1547–?
- Born: 1524
- Died: 4 February 1596 (aged 71–72)
- Spouse: Tahmasp I
- Issue: Pari Khan Khanum; Suleiman Mirza
- Dynasty: Shamkhal (by birth); Safavid (by marriage)
- Father: Chopan ibn Buday
- Religion: Islam

Sultan-Agha Khanum (Persian: سلطان آقا خانم, romanized: Soltān-Āqā Xānum), also in Western sources Corasi, was a Safavid wife of Kumyk origin, as the second wife of Safavid shah Tahmasp I (r. 1524–1576).

== Life ==
She was of Kumyk origin. Although she is often referred to as being of Circassian heritage; though, in Persian, the word Cherkes (چرکس, 'Circassian') is sometimes applied generally to peoples of the Caucasus living beyond Derbent in Dagestan. Her father was Choban b. Budai (d. 1574), Shamkhal of Tarki.

She was the sister of the Safavid-Kumyk noble Shamkhal Sultan, future shamkhals Eldar, Mohammad, Andi and Girai, and her brother, Emamqoli Khan was also in Safavid service.

She married Tahmasp I c. 1547, and became the mother of princess Pari Khan Khanum and prince Suleiman Mirza (b. 28 March 1554, Nakhchivan).

== Sources ==
- Bierbrier, Morris (1997). "The Descendants of Theodora Comnena of Trebizond". The Genealogist. 11 (2).
- Blow, David (2009). Shah Abbas: The Ruthless King Who became an Iranian Legend. London, UK: I. B. Tauris & Co. Ltd. p. 20. ISBN 978-1845119898. LCCN 2009464064.
- Nashat, Guity; Beck, Lois, eds. (2003). Women in Iran from the Rise of Islam to 1800. University of Illinois Press. ISBN 978-0252071218.
- Newman, Andrew J. (2012). Safavid Iran: Rebirth of a Persian Empire. I.B.Tauris. p. 35. ISBN 978-0857716613.
- Parsadust, Manuchehr (2009). "PARIḴĀN ḴĀNOM". Encyclopaedia Iranica.
