= Mohammad Baqer Mirza =

Safavid crown prince (1587–1614)

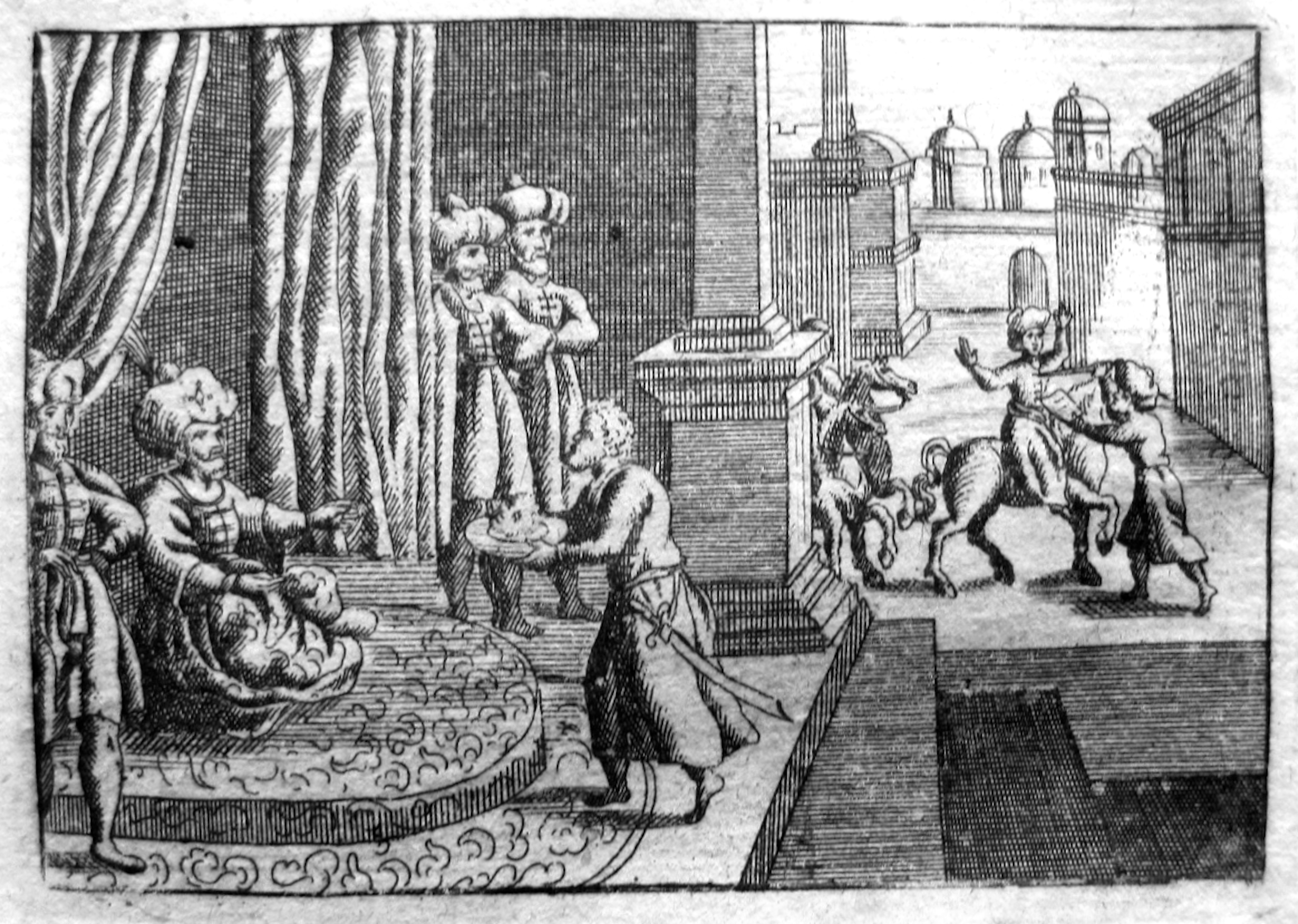
- Shah Abbas I verifies the murder of his son Mohammad Baqer Mirza ("Safi Mirza") in 1615. European engraving (1694)

Safavid Crown Prince
- Tenure: 1 October 1587 – 2 February 1614
- Monarch: Shah Abbas I

Governor of Mashhad
- Tenure: 1587–1588

Governor of Hamadan
- Tenure: 1591–1592
- Born: Mohammad Baqer Mirza; 15 September 1587; Mashhad
- Died: 25 January 1615 ( aged 27); Rasht
- Spouse: Fakhr Jahan Begum; Dilaram Khanum
- Issue: Suleiman Mirza; Sam Misza
Regnal name
- Safi Mirza
- Dynasty: Safavid dynasty
- Father: Abbas the Great

Mohammad Baqer Mirza (Persian: محمدباقرمیرزا) better known in the West as Safi Mirza (صفی‌میرزا; 15 September 1587, Mashhad – 2 February 1614, Rasht) was the oldest son of Shah Abbas the Great (r. 1588-1629), and the crown prince of the Safavid dynasty during Abbas' reign and his own short life.

Safi Mirza was caught in one of the court intrigues in which several leading Circassians were involved, which would eventually cost him his life, and his place in the line of succession to become the next Shah. His son became the next Shah, known by his dynastic name Safi (r. 1629-1642).

== Life ==
Mohammed Baqer Mirza was born in September 1587 by either one of Abbas' Christian Circassian wives, or by Fakhr-i Jahan Begam. Of Abbas' five sons, three had survived past childhood, so the Safavid succession seemed secure. He was on good terms with Mohammed Baqer Mirza, his oldest son and crown prince. In 1614, however, during a punitive campaign in Georgia against two former loyal Georgian subjects, Teimuraz I and Luarsab II, the shah heard rumours that the prince was conspiring against his life with a leading Circassian, Farhad Beg Cherkes. Shortly after, Mohammed Baqer broke protocol during a hunt by killing a boar before the shah had chance to put his spear in. This seemed to confirm Abbas' suspicions, causing him to sink into melancholy; he no longer trusted any of his three sons. In 1615 he decided he had no choice but to have Mohammed killed. Another Circassian, named Behbud Beg, carried out the Shah's orders, and the prince was murdered in a hammam in the city of Resht; he was buried in Ardabil. The shah almost immediately regretted his action and was plunged into grief.

In 1621 Abbas fell seriously ill. Thinking his father was on his deathbed, his son and heir, Khodabandeh Mirza, began to celebrate his accession to the throne with his Qizilbash supporters. But the shah recovered and proceeded to punish his son by blinding him, disqualifying him from ever taking the throne. The blinding was only partially successful, however, and the prince's followers planned to smuggle him out of the country to safety in a fabricated treason. But the plot was betrayed, the prince's followers were executed, and the prince himself imprisoned in the fortress of Alamut, where he would later be murdered by Abbas' successor, Shah Safi.

Unexpectedly, Abbas now chose as his heir the son of Mohammed Baqer Mirza, Sam Mirza, a cruel and introverted character who was said to loathe his grandfather because of his father's murder. It was he who succeeded Shah Abbas at the age of seventeen in 1629, taking the name Shah Safi.

== Family ==
Safi married his first wife Fakhr Jahan Begum, a daughter of Shah Ismail II, in November 1601 in Isfahan. She was the mother of his son Soltan Suleiman Mirza who was blinded in 1621 and killed in August 1632 at Alamut, Qazvin. Safi's second wife was Dilaram Khanum, a Georgian. Their son Soltan Abul-Naser Sam Mirza succeeded his grandfather Abbas the Great and became known as Safi of Persia.
