= Vladimir Baragun =

Vladimir Baragun Бэрэгъун Владимир
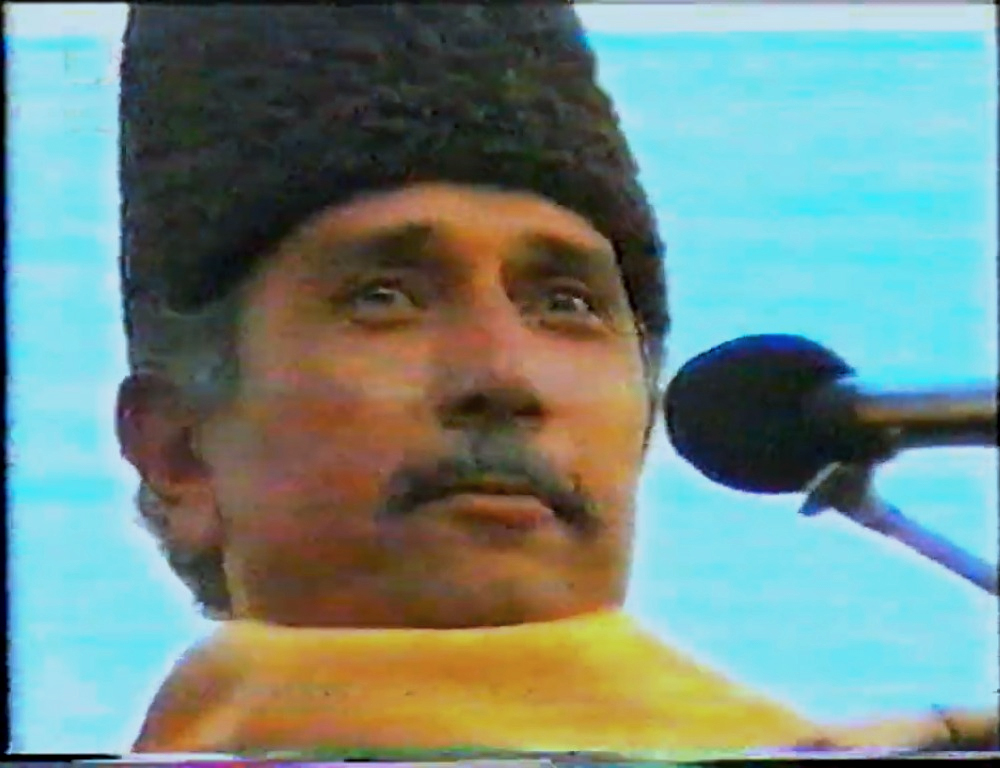
- Baragun at the Circassian Culture Festival in Maykop, Adygea, in 1993.

Background information
- Born: 31 December 1939; Kenzhe, Kabardino-Balkarian ASSR, Russian SFSR, USSR
- Died: 13 October 1997 (aged 57) Nalchik, Kabardino-Balkaria, Russia
- Genre: Opera
- Years active: 1969–1997
- Website: baragunvladimir.com

Vladimir Khatizovich Baragunov (Kabardian: Бэрэгъун Хьэтиз и къуэ Владимир) (Note: Russian: Влади́мир Хати́зович Барагу́нов), was a Circassian singer and musicologist.

== Biography ==
He was born in the village of Kenzhe, Kabardino-Balkarian ASSR. In 1969, he graduated from the Saratov State Conservatory. Between 1969 and 1977, he worked as a soloist at the Kabardino-Balkarian Musical Theater. He performed 19 opera roles and recorded hundreds of works on vinyl. Between the years of 1977–1987, he served as a soloist and artistic director of the Kabardino-Balkarian State Philharmonic; from 1987 to 1997 he was the philharmonic director.

He was also one of the co-authors of the three-volume work "Circassian Folk Songs and Instrumental Melodies", along with Evgeny Gippius and Zaramuk Kardangushev.

== Discography ==
Album: Kabardian Folk Songs (1973)
Song	Translation	Track No.
Кавказ къуршхэр (Адыгэ пащтыхьхэм я гъыбзэ)	Caucasus Mountains (The Lament of the Circassian Sultans)	A1
Анзор и къуэ	The Son of Anzor	A2
Мартинэ	Martina	A3
Си Пакъ	My Pug-Nosed	B1
ДжэгуакIуэ уэрэд	Minstrel Song	B2
Уэдобнэ джабэ	Vuadobna Slope	B3
Ашэмэз и пшыналъэ	The Melody of Ashamaz	B4
Сэнджэлей	Sanjaley	B5

Album: Kabardian Folk Songs (1976)
Song	Translation	Track No.
Сэнджэлей И Уэред	Song of Sanjaley	A1
Джатэгъжъхэ Iэгъурбий	Jataghshha Aghurbiy	A2
Мэзгуащэ	Mezguashe (The Forest Lady)	A3
Мэзгуащэ (2nd version)	Mezguashe (The Forest Lady)	A3
ГъукI Уэрэд	Iron Song	A4
Нысашэ Уэрэд	Wedding Song	B1
Ашэмэз И Уэред	Song of Ashamaz	B2
Удж Хъурей	Circle Dance	B3

Album: Circassian Nart Songs (1987) (Uncategorized)
Song	Translation	Track No.
Нартыжь уэрэд	Old Nart Song	A1
Нарт Орзэмэсрэ Сэтэнейрэ я пшыналъэ	Melody of Worzemes and Satanay	A2
Nart Sosruko
Сосрыкъуэрэ ТIотIрэшрэ зозауэ (1st vocalist)	Sosruko and Totrash are Fighting	B1
Сосрыкъуэ мафIэ къехь	Sosruko Brings Fire	B2
Сэтэней и гъыбзэ	Lament of Satanay	B3
Nart Badanoko
Бэдынокъуэ къызэралъхуэр	Birth of Badanoko	C1
Бэдынокъуэ нарт хасэм зэрыкIуар	Badanoko Arrives at the Nart Council	D1
Nart Ashamaz
Ашэмэз и адэр зыукIар къещIэ	Ashamaz Learns His Father's Killer	E1
Ашэмэз и адэм илъ ещIэж	Ashamaz Takes His Father's Revenge	E2
Ашэмэз и адэм илъ ещIэж	Ashamaz Takes His Father's Revenge	F1
Nart Pataraz
Бэтэрэз Гъунд-Гъунд къалэр къещтэ	Pataraz Takes the Ghund-Ghund Fortress	G1
Бэтэрэз и адэм илъ ещIэж	Pataraz Takes His Father's Revenge	H1
Nart Melodies
Лашин нартыжьхэм яхуоусэ	Lashin is Singing for the Old Narts	H2
Къэбэрдей къафэ	Kabardian Dance	H3
Бжьэдыгъу къафэ	Bzhedug Dance	H4
Шэрджэс къафэ	Circassian Dance	H5

Album: Songs From Vladimir Baragun (1987)
Song	Translation	Track No.
Къафэжь	Old Dance	A1
МахуэщІэ Дыгъэм И Къафэ	Dance of the New Day's Sun	A2
МахуэщІэ Дыгъэм И Къафэ (2nd version)	Dance of the New Day's Sun	A2
Инэркъуей МафІэсым И Уэрэд	Song of the Yinarkuey Fire	A3
Инэркъуей МафІэсым И Уэрэд (2nd version)	Song of the Yinarkuey Fire	A3
Азэпщ И Къуэ Гъудэбэрд И Тхьэусыхэ	Lament of Azepsh's Son Ghudeberd	A4
Хьэтхым И КъуэкІасэм И Уэрэд	Song of Hatkh's Kochas	B1
Къербэч	Kerbech	B2
Андемыркъан	Andemirkan	B3
Хьэтх Гъуазэм И КъуэкІэ Ди Мыхьэмэд	Our Muhammad, The Son of Hatkh Ghuaza	B4

Other Songs
Song	Translation
Абазэ Къэмбот и тхьэусыхэ	Lament of Abaza Kambot
Андемыркъан и уэрэд	Song of Andemirkan
Ахьмэд и уэрэд	Song of Ahmed
Ахьмэд и Цеижьыр Бэлацэщ	Ahmed's Old Cherkesska is Puffy
Герменчик	Germenchik
Дахэнагъуэ	Dakhenaghua (Brown Eyed Beauty)
Зауэм дещ	War Separates Us
Зауэм докIуэ	We Are Going To War
Къэбэрдей жэщтеуэм и уэрэд	Song of the Kabardian Night Assault
Мэлыхъуэ уэрэд	Sheperd's Song
Насрэн жьакIэ	Nasren Zhacha
Нарт щIыналъэу къэбэрдей (Нарт пшыналъэ)	Nart's Homeland Kabardia
Наурыз Мамышэ и уэрэд	Song of Nawriz Mamisha
Нысашэ къэхъуащ	Wedding Has Happened
Нысэ къыдошэ	We Are Bringing the Bride In
Нысэищэ уэрэд	Wedding Song
Псынэдахэ	Psinedakhe (Beautiful Fountain)
Си адэр сыцIыхуу сщытакъым	I Never Knew My Father
Си лъагъуныгъэм и дамэ	The Wing of My Love
Си насып	My Destiny
Си ШыкӀэпшынэ	My Shichepshin
Уа купсэ щlалэ	Handsome Lad
Уэй Мы Дунэйм	Oh This World
Уи лъэгъуныгъэр	Your Love
Unknown Song

Russian Songs
Song	Translation
Мой край Кабардино-Балкария	My Krai Kabardino-Balkaria
Песня Про Нальчик	Nalchik Song
Родная сторона	Homeland
Старинный танец	Old Dance
Старинный танец (2nd version)	Old Dance

== Awards and titles ==
- State Prize of the Kabardino-Balkarian ASSR
- "Golden Axe" – the highest award of the International Folklore Festival in Poland
- People's Artist of the Kabardino-Balkarian ASSR (1981)
- Honored Artist of the Russian Federation (1996)
