= Zamudin Guchev =

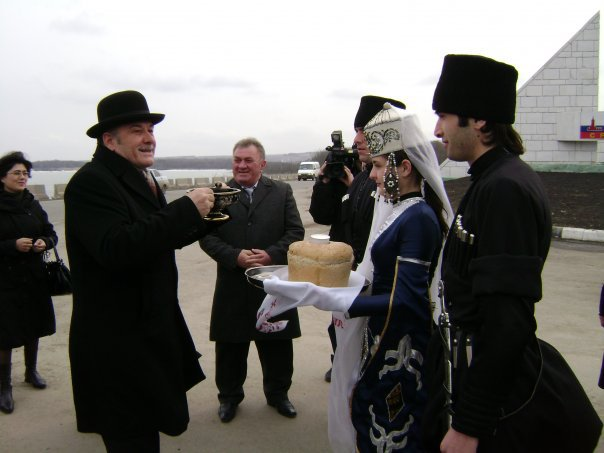
Zamudin Guchev

Zamudin Guchev (Adyghe: Гъукӏэ Замудин [ʁʷət͡ʃʼa zaːməwdəjn]; Russian: Замудин Гучев; Arabic: زامودين جوتشة) is a Circassian craftsman and musician. He currently lives in the Republic of Adygea, and he is well known in the North Caucasus and among Circassian diaspora for preserving the ancient Circassians cultural heritage.

Zamudin established his ensemble(ZHEW) which uses the ancient Circassians musical instruments, and to be precise the Shetcha Pshen (Adyghe: Шыкӏэ пщын [ʃət͡ʃʼa pɕən]), the wood stakes (Adyghe: ӏэгу пхъэкӏыч [ʔaɡʷ pχat͡ʃʼət͡ʃ]), and the Circassian horn (Adyghe: Бжъэмый [bʐaməj]).
