= Shamkhal Sultan =

Kumyk noble

Shamkhal Sultan, was an important Kumyk noble of the second half of the 16th century in the Safavid Empire.

== Biography ==
=== Family ===
Shamkhal Sultan, alongside his sister Sultan-Agha Khanum, was from a prominent Dagestan-origin Kumyk Shamkhal family from within the Safavid Empire. Sultan-Agha Khanum was married to king Tahmasp I, having a daughter known as Pari Khan Khanum, and a son known as Suleiman Mirza.

=== Career ===
Shamkhal Sultan appears prominently on the political scene at the same time as his niece, Pari Khan Khanum, who was the daughter of his sister Sultan-Agha Khanum and king Tahmasp I. He participated actively in Pari Khan Khanum's political designs and acted for a time as her spokesman, and during their presence, the Safavid political sphere was dominated by ethnic Circassians, amongst the other factions that joined Shamkhal Sultan and his cousin. He was executed shortly after his niece's own assassination in 1578.

== Sources ==
- Bierbrier, Morris (1997). "The Descendants of Theodora Comnena of Trebizond". The Genealogist. 11 (2): 235, 239–240.
- Beck, Lois (2003). Nashat, Guity (ed.). Women in Iran from the Rise of Islam to 1800. University of Illinois Press. p. 147. ISBN 0252071212.
- Savory, Roger (2007). Iran Under the Safavids. Cambridge University Press. pp. 70–71. ISBN 978-0521042512.
- Parsadust, Manuchehr (2009). "PARIḴĀN ḴĀNOM". Encyclopaedia Iranica.
- Newman, Andrew J. (2008). Safavid Iran: Rebirth of a Persian Empire. I.B.Tauris. pp. 1–281. ISBN 9780857716613.
- Savory, Roger (2007). Iran under the Safavids. Cambridge University Press. pp. 1–288. ISBN 978-0521042512.
- Roemer, H.R. (1986). "The Safavid period". The Cambridge History of Iran, Volume 5: The Timurid and Safavid periods. Cambridge: Cambridge University Press. pp. 189–351. ISBN 9780521200943.
