= Behbud Khan Cherkes =

17th century Safavid official and provincial governor

Governor of Goklan
- In office 1606
- Monarch: Abbas the Great
- Preceded by: Ommat Soltan
- Succeeded by: Unknown

Governor of Gaskar
- In office 1620
- Monarch: Abbas the Great
- Preceded by: Mortezaqoli Khan Gaskari b. Amireh Siyavosh
- Succeeded by: Yusof Soltan

Governor of Astarabad
- In office 1620–1629
- Monarch: Abbas the Great
- Preceded by: Fereydun Khan Cherkes
- Succeeded by: Khosrow Khan Cherkes

Personal details
- Occupation: Official

Military service
- Allegiance: Safavid Iran

Behbud Khan Cherkes (Persian: بهبود خان چرکس), also known as Behbud Beg, was an Iranian gholam of Circassian origin, who served during the reign of Shah Abbas the Great (r. 1588–1629). He held the governorship of Goklan in 1606, Gaskar in 1620, and Astarabad in 1620–1629.

In 1615, Behbud Khan Cherkes killed crown prince Mohammad Baqer Mirza on the orders of Shah Abbas.

== Sources ==
- Butler, John Anthony (2012). Travels in Africa, Persia, and Asia the Great, by Sir Thomas Herbert. ACMRS Publications. p. 403. ISBN 978-0866984751.
- Floor, Willem M. (2008). Titles and Emoluments in Safavid Iran: A Third Manual of Safavid Administration, by Mirza Naqi Nasiri. Washington, DC: Mage Publishers. pp. 153, 188, 196. ISBN 978-1933823232.
- Manz, Beatrice; Haneda, Masashi (1990). "ČARKAS". In Yarshater, Ehsan (ed.). Encyclopædia Iranica. Vol. IV/7: Calendars II–Cappadocia. London and New York: Routledge & Kegan Paul. pp. 816–819. ISBN 978-0-71009-130-7.

Preceded by Ommat Soltan	Governor of Goklan; 1606	Succeeded by ?
Preceded by Mortezaqoli Khan Gaskari b. Amireh Siyavosh	Governor of Gaskar; 1620	Succeeded by Yusof Soltan
Preceded by Fereydun Khan Cherkes	Governor of Astarabad; 1620–1629	Succeeded by Khosrow Khan Cherkes
