= Kuba Shaaban =

Circassian author

Kuba Shaaban Кубэ Щабан كوبا شعبان Кубов Шабан
- Born: 15 January 1890; Khakurinohabl, Circassia, Russian Empire
- Died: 20 January 1974 (aged 84); Paterson City, US
- Occupations: Writer, historian, playwright

Kuba Shaaban (Adyghe: Кубэ Щабан, romanized: Kubə Şaban; Arabic: كوبا شعبان; Russian: Кубов Шабан; b. 15 January 1890 – 20 January 1974), was a Circassian writer, historian, and playwright, famous for his advocacy of the Circassian culture. He produced works in almost every literary form, including plays, poetry, novels, essays, and historical works.

Shaaban spent his life traveling between different countries with Circassian diaspora, including Germany, Turkey, Syria, Jordan, France, and finally the United States gathering different types of the Circassian heritage. He succeeded in changing the writing alphabet of the Circassian language from Cyrillic script to Latin script among the Circassian diaspora.

Shaaban wrote many plays such as The Circassians Battles and The Immigration of the Circassians, and many books such as The Grammar of the Circassian Language and Circassian Alphabet.

The ministry of culture in the Republic of Adygea held a memorial day dedicated to Shaaban in December 2010 for his 120-year anniversary.
