= Suleiman Mirza (son of Tahmasp I) =

Governor of Shiraz
- Tenure: 1555–1557/58

Governor of Mashhad
- Tenure: 1567–1573
- Born: 28 March 1554; Nakhchivan
- Died: 30 October 1576 (aged 22)
- Burial: Imamzadeh Hossein
- Dynasty: Safavid
- Father: Tahmasp I
- Mother: Sultan-Agha Khanum

Suleiman Mirza (Persian: سلیمان میرزا, romanized: Soleymān Mirzā; b. 28 March 1554, Nakhchivan – d. 30 October 1576) was a Safavid prince. The son of king Tahmasp I (r. 1524–1576) by his Kumyk wife Sultan-Agha Khanum, he functioned for several years as an official, serving as the governor (hakem) of Shiraz (1555–1557/58, under a laleh) and Mashhad (1567–1573, under a laleh as well). His full sister, Pari Khan Khanum, and their Kumyk uncle, Shamkhal Sultan, were both extremely pivotal figures in Safavid affairs during the latter half of the 16th century.

During the last few years of Tahmasp I's life, when a protracted competition for the throne was evident, as well as much jockeying for position by the rival factions, a number of Qizilbash chiefs decided, in 1574, to openly support Suleiman Mirza as heir apparent. When his half-brother Ismail Mirza Safavi (who succeeded as Ismail II) was eventually enthroned on 22 August 1576, the latter ordered the systematic murder or blinding of any prince of royal blood who could become the center of a conspiracy against him. As a result, Suleiman Mirza was killed on 30 October 1576 by the order of his half-brother. He was buried at the Shrine of Imamzadeh Hossein in Qazvin, the then royal capital.

== Sources ==
- Bierbrier, Morris (1997). "The Descendants of Theodora Comnena of Trebizond". The Genealogist. 11 (2).
- Floor, Willem M. (2008). Titles and Emoluments in Safavid Iran: A Third Manual of Safavid Administration, by Mirza Naqi Nasiri. Washington, DC: Mage Publishers. ISBN 978-1933823232.
- Parsadust, Manuchehr (2009). "PARIḴĀN ḴĀNOM". Encyclopaedia Iranica.
- Savory, Roger (2007). Iran Under the Safavids. Cambridge University Press. ISBN 978-0521042512.
