= Qazaq Khan Cherkes =

Safavid military commander and governor

Governor of Shirvan
- In office 1624–1633
- Monarchs: Abbas the Great; Safi
- Preceded by: Yusuf Khan
- Succeeded by: Farrokh Khan

Governor of Astarabad
- In office 1639–1640
- Monarch: Safi
- Preceded by: Khosrow Khan Cherkes
- Succeeded by: Hoseyn Khan b. Zaman Beg Mazandarani

Personal details
- Children: Najafqoli Khan Cherkes
- Occupation: Military leader, official

Military service
- Allegiance: Safavid Iran

Qazaq Khan Cherkes (Persian: قزاق خان چرکس) was a military commander in Safavid Iran of Circassian origin, who also served as the governor (beglarbeg) of Shirvan (1624–1633) and Astarabad (1639–1640).

A high-ranking member of the gholam military corps, he was furthermore appointed head of the Qaramanlu and Keneslu Qizilbash troops by then incumbent Shah Abbas I (r. 1588–1629) as part of the latter's policy to diminish the political influence of the Qizilbash. In 1632, during Shah Safi's (r. 1629–42) bloody purges, his relative, the prominent Circassian courtier Yusuf Agha was murdered, while Qazaq Khan Cherkes was deposed and imprisoned in 1633. He nevertheless later returned on the political scene in the last years of Safi's reign, when he was given a new governorship in 1639. His son Najafqoli Khan Cherkes would hold several influential positions as well.

== Sources ==
- Floor, Willem M. (2008). Titles and Emoluments in Safavid Iran: A Third Manual of Safavid Administration, by Mirza Naqi Nasiri. Washington, DC: Mage Publishers. pp. 153, 286. ISBN 978-1933823232.
- Manz, Beatrice; Haneda, Masashi (1990). "ČARKAS". Encyclopaedia Iranica, Vol. IV, Fasc. 7. pp. 816–819. Archived from the original on 2014-11-02.
- Matthee, Rudolph P. (1999). The Politics of Trade in Safavid Iran: Silk for Silver, 1600–1730. Cambridge: Cambridge University Press. p. 120. ISBN 978-0521641319.

Preceded by Yusuf Khan (Armenian)	Governor of Shirvan; 1624–1633	Succeeded by Farrokh Khan
Preceded by Khosrow Khan Cherkes	Governor of Astarabad; 1639–1640	Succeeded by Hoseyn Khan b. Zaman Beg Mazandarani
