= Fereydun Khan Cherkes =

Safavid official and military commander (died 1620/21)

Governor of Astarabad
- In office 1605/06–1620
- Monarch: Abbas the Great
- Preceded by: Yusuf Khan
- Succeeded by: Behbud Khan Cherkes

Personal details
- Died: 1620/21
- Occupation: Official, military leader

Military service
- Allegiance: Safavid Iran

Fereydun Khan Cherkes (Note: Also spelled "Faridun" or "Feridun".) (Persian: فریدون خان چرکس; died 1620/21) was a Safavid official and military commander of Circassian origin, who served as the governor (beglarbeg) of Astarabad in 1605/06–1620, during the reign of Shah Abbas I (r. 1588–1629).

== Biography ==
Fereydun was kidnapped at a young age, and spent more than seven years in captivity. Finally, he was bought as a gholam by merchants acting on behalf of the Safavid royal court. Afterwards, he was promoted to the position of the keeper of the king's armor (qurchi-e zereh), and by that became part of the expanding number of gholams within the royal household (gholāmān-e ḵhāṣṣeh-ye sharifeh).

In late October 1605, during the Ottoman-Safavid War of 1603–1618, amidst a period of heavy fighting in Azerbaijan against the Ottomans, a Kurdish prisoner from the Mokri tribe attempted to murder king Abbas I. However, Fereydun Khan Cherkes managed to save his life. As a reward for his bravery, Abbas I appointed him in either December 1605 or November 1606 as the governor of the Astarabad province. During a part of the Safavid era, including Fereydun Khan Cherkes' tenure, the Astarabad province encompassed most of today's provinces of Golestan, Semnan, and North Khorasan.

Fereydun's main task as a governor was to ensure the safety and protection of the Astarabad province from the various Turkmen nomads of Khwarezm, as well as from those indigenous Turkmens of the northern fringes of the Astarabad province. They were keen on expanding their territory and to carry out raids often — the latter which caused major problems for the rural and urban people who were living close to these border regions of the Safavid realm. As a result, he had to conduct several wars against these nomads on the northern fringes of the province. These successful wars led by Fereydun (as well as a brief coverage of his early life) were described by Moḥammad Ṭāher b. Ḥasan (Ḵādem-e Besṭāmi’) in his short history entitled Fotuḥāt-e Fereyduniyeh. He was succeeded as governor by Behbud Khan Cherkes. (Note: According to the Encyclopaedia Iranica, Fereydun Khan Cherkes was a eunuch. However, according to Willem Floor, his successor Behbud Khan Cherkes was his son, which would make it therefore naturally impossible for him to be an eunuch.)

== Sources ==
- Floor, Willem M. (2008). Titles and Emoluments in Safavid Iran: A Third Manual of Safavid Administration, by Mirza Naqi Nasiri. Washington, DC: Mage Publishers. ISBN 978-1933823232.
- Ghereghlou, Kioumars (2009). "ḴĀDEM-E BESṬĀMI". In Yarshater, Ehsan (ed.). Encyclopædia Iranica. Vol. XV/3: Julfa I. Safavid period–Kafir Kala. London and New York: Routledge & Kegan Paul. pp. 325–326. ISBN 978-1-934283-21-9.

Preceded by Yusuf Khan (Armenian)	Governor of Astarabad; 1605/06–1620	Succeeded by Behbud Khan Cherkes
