= Erivan province (Safavid Iran) =

Province of Safavid Iran from 1502 to 1736

Velāyat-e Iravān Chokhur-e Sa'd
- 1502–1736
- The administrative divisions of Safavid Iran in the South Caucasus
- Status: Province of Safavid Iran
- Capital: Erivan (Yerevan)
- Common languages: Persian, Azerbaijani, Kurdish, Armenian
- Government: Province
- beglarbeg, hakem
Succeeded by
Afsharid Iran
- Today part of: Armenia; Azerbaijan; Iran; Turkey

The Erivan province (Note: Also spelled as the "Iravan province", "Erevan province", or "Yerevan province".) (Persian: ولایت ایروان, romanized: Velāyat-e Iravān), also known as Chokhur-e Sa'd (Note: Also spelled as "Chukhur-e Sa'd", "Chukhur Sa'd", "Chukhur-i(-)Sa'd", or "Chughur-i Sa'd". The comparable administrative entity of the Zand and Qajar era, known as the Erivan Khanate, was also alternatively known as "Chokhur-e Sa'd".) (چخور سعد), was a province of Safavid Iran, centered on the territory of the present-day Armenia. Erivan (Yerevan) was the provincial capital and the seat of the Safavid governors.

At the end of the Safavid period, it had the following administrative jurisdictions; Bayazid, Maghazberd (now near Üçbölük village of Arpaçay district), Maku, Nakhchivan, Sadarak, Shadidlu, Zaruzbil, and the tribal district of the Donbolis.

The provinces of Erivan and Karabakh were the two administrative territories that made up Iranian Armenia.

== History ==
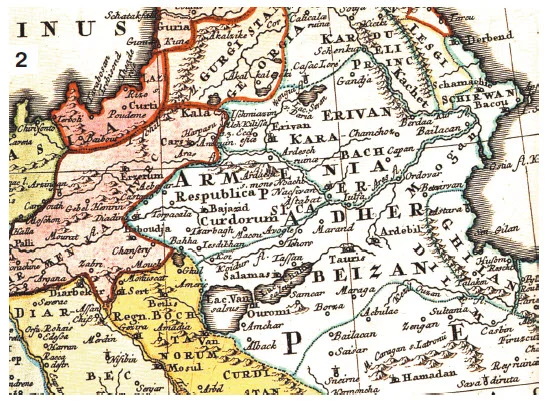
Erivan, Armenia Persica XVIII century

The alternate name of the province, Chokhur-e Sa'd, had been in use since the fourteenth century. The name is derived from a certain Amir Sa'd, the leader of the Turkic Sa'dlu tribe, who had accompanied Timur from Central Asia. The Sa'dlu's had become prominent under their leader, Amir Sa'd, and settled in the Erivan area, where Amir Sa'd became the governor of the area. Chokhur-e Sa'd literally means "Vale of Sa'd". The term initially designated a much smaller area than the territory of the future province. The contemporary Armenian equivalent of this name was Sahata pos 'Sa'd's pit' or Yerkirn Sahatu 'Sa'd's land'. In 16th–17th-century Persian sources, the element Sa'd was poetically reinterpreted as meaning "happy".

Historic Armenia, which included the territory of the Erivan province, made part of Safavid Iran from its earliest days. In 1502, the first governor of the Erivan province was appointed by then incumbent King (Shah) Ismail I (r. 1501–1524), and royal Safavid edicts make mention of the province as early as 1505 and 1506. As a result of the Peace of Amasya of 1555, the Safavids, then under King Tahmasp I (r. 1524–1576) were forced to cede the western part of historic Armenia to the expanding Ottoman Empire.

In 1578, the Ottomans invaded Iran, and by 1583 they were in possession of the Erivan province. In 1604, Safavid King Abbas I (r. 1588–1629) expelled them and re-established the Safavid sway.

Around the same time, realizing the vulnerability of the province, King Abbas I ordered for the mass deportation and relocation of the Armenians from his Armenian territories (which thus included the Erivan province), deeper into mainland Iran.

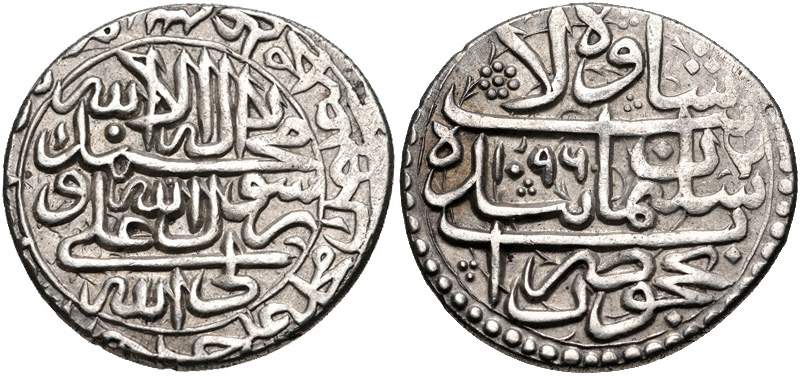
Silver coin of Shah Suleiman I (r. 1666–1694), struck at the Nakhchivan mint, dated 1684/5

At the beginning of the seventeenth century, some 19,000 converted Catholic Armenians were living in three towns and twelve villages in the Nakhchivan, Ernjak and Jahuk regions, and had ten Catholic churches to serve them. When the Safavid government started to decline, in the second half of the 17th century, during the reign of King Suleiman I (1666–1694), the situation of the Catholic Armenians of Nakhchivan deteriorated. As a result of the increasing religious intolerance and misrule by governmental officials, the majority of the Armenian Catholics of Nakchivan had to convert to Islam. The remaining minority either returned to the Armenian Apostolic Church, or migrated to Smyrna, Constantinople, Bursa and other towns in the Ottoman Empire.

In 1639, the Safavids and the Ottomans concluded the Treaty of Zuhab. Eastern Armenia was reconfirmed as being an Iranian domain, whereas Western Armenia was irrevocably lost to the Ottomans. The ensuing period following 1639 was marked by peace and prosperity in the province. At the end of the seventeenth century, the Erivan province had become a centre of Catholic missionary activities in the empire.

In 1679, the province was the epicenter of an earthquake, which resulted in the destruction and damaging of numerous notable structures.

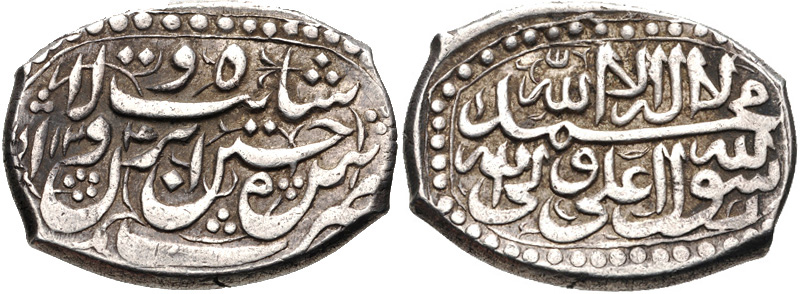
Silver coin of Shah Soltan Hoseyn (r. 1694–1722), struck at the Erivan mint, dated 1711/2

In 1714, the mayor (kalantar) of the provincial capital, Mohammad Reza Beg, was appointed as the new ambassador to France, and led the embassy to Louis XIV of 1715.

In 1724, the Ottomans and the Russians invaded the crumbling empire. By the Treaty of Constantinople (1724), they agreed to divide the conquered territories between them. Per the treaty, the Ottomans gained the territory of the Erivan province.

By 1735, Nader-Qoli Beg (later known as Nader Shah) had restored the Safavid sway over the Caucasus, including the Erivan province. In 1736, he deposed the Safavids and became king himself, establishing Afsharid Iran.

== Mint ==
The provincial capital, Erivan, housed an important Safavid mint. As much of Iran's gold and silver was imported from the Ottoman Empire, the mints near the border such as Erivan, Tabriz and Tiflis (Tbilisi) played an important role in converting foreign specie into Iranian coins. In the 1660s and 1670s, the office of mint master (zarrab-bashi) of Erivan was held by a series of local Armenians. The mint master of Nakhchivan in 1691 was also an Armenian.

== Stationed Safavid force ==
The Erivan province was of high importance to the Safavids, partly due to the fact that it bordered the Ottoman Empire. The French missionary and traveller Père Sanson, who was in Iran during the latter part of King Suleiman I's reign (1666–1694), wrote that some 12,000 Safavid troops were stationed in the Erivan province.

== Religious and ethnic affiliation ==
Muslims constituted majorities in the province, whereas ethnic Armenians were a minority. Until the mid-fourteenth century, Armenians had constituted a majority in Eastern Armenia. At the close of the fourteenth century, after Timur's campaigns, Islam had become the dominant faith, and Armenians became a minority in Eastern Armenia.

== List of governors ==
Date	Governor
1502–?	Qaraja Ilyas Bayburdlu
1509–?	Amir Beg Mowsellu Torkman
1514–?	Hamzeh Beg, son of Hoseyn Beg Laleh Ustajlu
1516–1527	Div Sultan Rumlu
1527	Soleyman Beg Rumlu
1549–1550	Hoseyn Khan Soltan Rumlu
1551–1568	Shahqoli Soltan Ustajlu, son of Hamzeh Soltan Qazaq
1568–1575	Tokhmaq Khan Ustajlu
1575–1576	Abu Torab Soltan
1576–1577	Khalil Khan Afshar
1578–1583	Tokhmaq Khan Ustajlu
1583–1604	Ottoman occupation
1604–1625	Amir Guneh Khan Aghcheh-Qoyunlu Qajar (aka Saru Aslan)
1625–1635	Tahmasp Ali Khan Aghcheh-Qoyunlu Qajar (aka Shir-bacheh)
1635–1636	Ottoman occupation
1636–1639	Kalb Ali Khan Afshar
1639–1648	Mohammadqoli [Beg] Khan Chaghatay (aka Chaghatay Kotuk Mohammad Khan)
1648–1653	Kaykhosrow Khan Cherkes
1654–1656	Mohammadqoli Khan
1656–1663	Najafqoli Khan Cherkes
1663–1666	Abbasqoli Khan Qajar (son of Amir Guneh Khan)
1666–1674	Safi Khan Lezgi
1674	Saru Khan Beg (interim governor)
1674–1679	Safiqoli Khan
1679–1688	Zal Khan
1690–1693	Mohammadqoli Khan
1693	Farz Ali Khan
1695–1698	Allahqoli Khan
1700	Farz Ali Khan
1704	Mohammad Khan
1705	Abd ol-Masud Khan
?–1716	Mohammad-Ali Khan
1716–?	Unnamed son of the predecessor
1719–1723	Mehr-Ali Khan
1723	Mahmadqoli Khan
1724–1735	Ottoman occupation
1735–1736	Safavid hegemony restored by Nader-Qoli Beg (later known as Nader Shah)

== Sources ==
- Bournoutian, George A. (1980). The Population of Persian Armenia Prior to and Immediately Following its Annexation to the Russian Empire: 1826–1832. Conference on "Nationalism and Social Change in Transcaucasia". Kennan Institute Occasional Paper Series #91. Washington, D.C.: Woodrow Wilson International Center for Scholars.
- Bournoutian, George A. (1992). The Khanate of Erevan Under Qajar Rule: 1795–1828. Persian Studies Series. Mazda Publishers.
- Bournoutian, George A. (2006). A Concise History of the Armenian People (5 ed.). Costa Mesa, California: Mazda Publishers. ISBN 1-56859-141-1.
- Floor, Willem (2001). Safavid Government Institutions. Costa Mesa, California: Mazda Publishers. ISBN 978-1568591353.
- Floor, Willem M. (2008). Titles and Emoluments in Safavid Iran: A Third Manual of Safavid Administration, by Mirza Naqi Nasiri. Washington, DC: Mage Publishers. pp. 1–337. ISBN 978-1933823232.
- Floor, Willem; Herzig, Edmund, eds. (2012). Iran and the World in the Safavid Age. I.B. Tauris. ISBN 978-1780769905.
- Kostikyan, Kristine (2012). "European Catholic Missionary Propaganda among the Armenian Population of Safavid Iran". In Floor, Willem; Herzig, Edmund (eds.). Iran and the World in the Safavid Age. I.B.Tauris. ISBN 978-1780769905.
- Hacikyan, Agop Jack; Basmaijan, Gabriel; Franchuk, Edward S.; Ouzounian, Nourhan, eds. (2005). "The Heritage of Armenian Literature". The Heritage of Armenian Literature: From the eighteenth century to modern times. Detroit: Wayne State University Press. p. 133. ISBN 978-0814332214.
- Imber, Colin (2012). "The Battle of Sufiyan, 1605: A Symptom of Ottoman Military Decline?". In Floor, Willem; Herzig, Edmund (eds.). Iran and the World in the Safavid Age. I.B.Tauris. ISBN 978-1780769905.
- Matthee, Rudi; Floor, Willem; Clawson, Patrick (2013). The Monetary History of Iran: From the Safavids to the Qajars. I.B. Tauris. pp. 1–320. ISBN 978-0857721723.
- Mikaberidze, Alexander, ed. (2011). Conflict and Conquest in the Islamic World: A Historical Encyclopedia (Vol. 1). ABC-CLIO. ISBN 978-1598843378.
- Papazian, H. D. (1960). "Ōtar tirapetutʻyuně Araratyan erkrum (ZhE d.)" Օտար տիրապետությունը Արարատյան երկրում (ԺԵ դ.) [Foreign rule in the Ararat region (15th c.)]. HSSṚ GA Teghekagir hasarakakan gitutʻyunneri (7–8): 21–40.
- Payaslian, Simon (2007). The History of Armenia: From the Origins to the Present. Palgrave Macmillan. ISBN 978-0230608580.
- Rayfield, Donald (2013). Edge of Empires: A History of Georgia. Reaktion Books. ISBN 978-1780230702.
