= Yusuf Agha =

Safavid gholam and courtier of Circassian origin

Yusuf Āghā (fl. 17th century – d. 1632; Persian: یوسف آقا) was a Safavid gholam and courtier of Circassian origin, who wielded great influence and power during the reign of king Abbas I (r. 1588–1629).

== Biography ==
As Yusuf was an eunuch, he was given the title of Āghā (also spelled Aga), which was common amongst eunuchs who served at the court. He enjoyed great prestige in the harem of king Abbas I. Apart from being the "master of the hunt" (mīr shekār-bāshi) which he was appointed as in 1629, he was also the master of the gholams of the royal harem, as well as the representative of the interests of the Armenian community of Isfahan, and was in fact the most powerful person in the Safavid harem until the reign of king Safi I (r. 1629–1642), when he and his family were purged. As Yusuf Agha was the supervisor of the Armenian community in the capital, he has been linked to the great rise of the Armenians in the Safavid bureaucratic and mercantile organ. His position made him the center point of the Safavid silk production and cultivation, as not only was he the representative of the merchants who traded it, but his own relative, Qazaq Khan Cherkes, was the governor of Shirvan at the time, while one of his intimates, Manuchihr Khan administered Gaskar in Gilan – chief production centers of Safavid silk. Being the "master of the hunt", he acted as the liaison (or, contact) between the court and the Armenians of the capital, and presented their grievances and requests to the king. As the Armenians had grown to a powerful and rich faction within the empire by that time, they were willing to fund those causes lavishly which they deemed as important. Yusuf Agha himself was one of those who highly benefitted from this, as when he was executed in 1632 under Safi's reign, the exorbitant sum of 450,000 tomans was found in his possession. (Note: According to Matthee (2012), this number is "surely exaggerated".)

== Sources ==
- Bournoutian, George (1982). Eastern Armenia in the last decades of Persian rule, 1807-1828. Undena Publications. ISBN 978-0890031230.
- Floor, Willem M.; Faghfoory, Mohammad H. (2007). The Dastur Al-moluk: A Safavid State Manual, by Mohammad Rafi' al-Din Ansari. Mazda Publishers. pp. 187–188. ISBN 978-1568591957.
- Hambly, Gavin R.G. (1991). "Agha Muhammad Khan and the establishment of the Qajar dynasty". The Cambridge History of Iran, Vol. 7: From Nadir Shah to the Islamic Republic. Cambridge: Cambridge University Press. pp. 104–144. ISBN 978-0521200950.
- Maeda, Hirotake (2006). "The forced migrations and reorganisation of the regional order in the Caucasus by Safavid Iran: Preconditions and developments described by Fazli Khuzani". In Ieda, Osamu; Uyama, Tomohiko (eds.). Reconstruction and interaction of Slavic Eurasia and its neighbouring worlds (PDF). Slavic Eurasian Studies, No.10. Sapporo: Slavic Research Centre, Hokkaido University. ISBN 4938637391.
- Matthee, Rudolph P. (1999). The Politics of Trade in Safavid Iran: Silk for Silver, 1600-1730. Cambridge: Cambridge University Press. p. 120. ISBN 978-0521641319.
- Matthee, Rudi (2012). Persia in Crisis: Safavid Decline and the Fall of Isfahan. I.B.Tauris. ISBN 978-1845117450.
- Mitchell, Colin P. (2011). New Perspectives on Safavid Iran: Empire and Society. Taylor & Francis. ISBN 978-1136991943.
- Newman, Andrew J. (2012). Safavid Iran: Rebirth of a Persian Empire. I.B.Tauris. ISBN 978-0857716613.

Preceded by Farhad Beg Cherkes	Master of the hunt (mīr shekār-bāshi); 1629	Succeeded by Qujeh Beg
