= Najafqoli Khan Cherkes =

Safavid governor

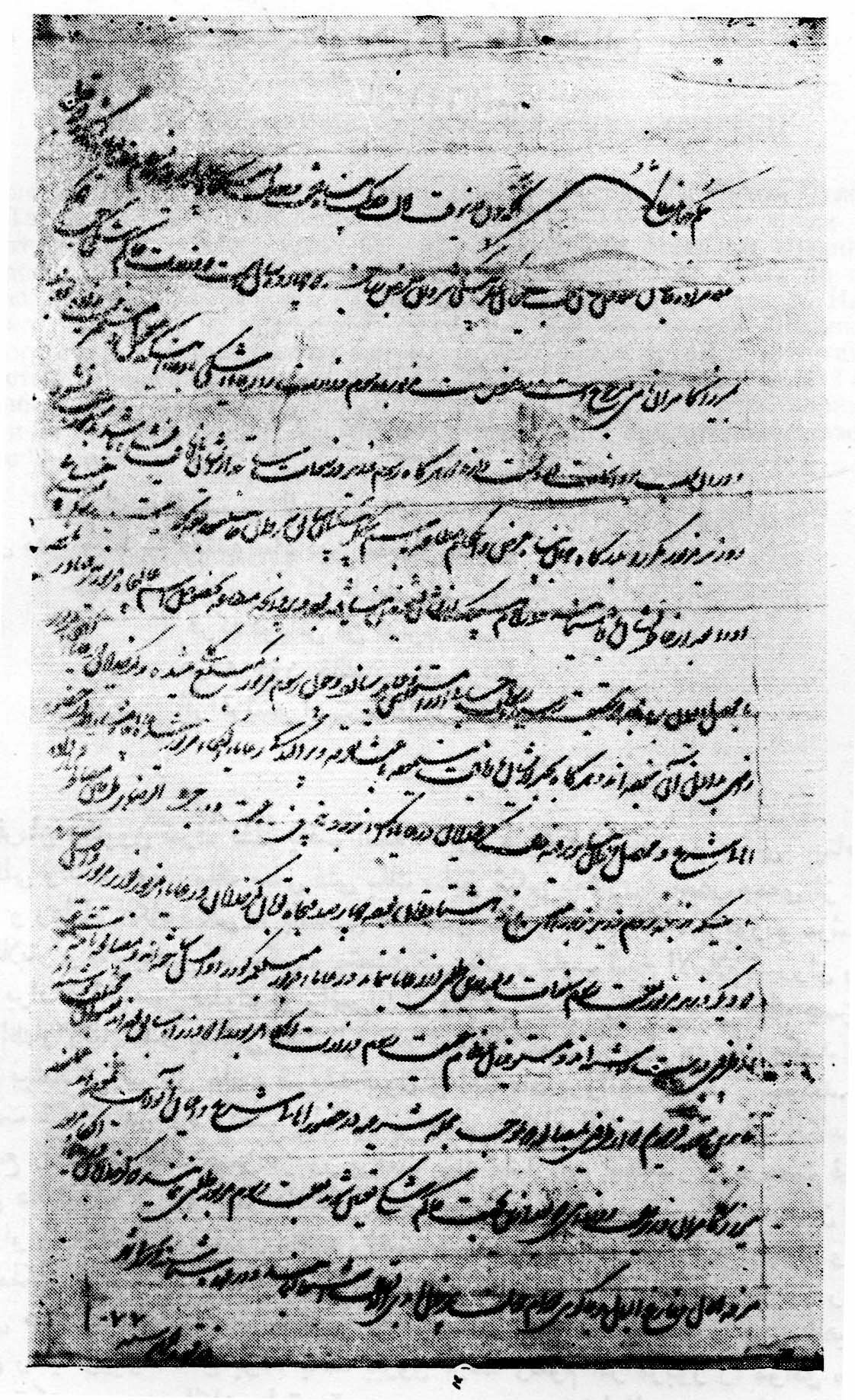
- A hokm by Safavid Shah Solayman I in Persian, dated 1667. The document answers a complaint of the governor of Shirvan Najafqoli Khan, whose vizier Mirza Kamran did not receive his rasm-e vezarat of 980 toman for 14 years because the local peasantry at one time had been exempted from taxes. A reduced amount of 450 toman is to be levied.

Governor of Erivan Province (Chokhur-e Sa'd)
- In office 1656–1663
- Preceded by: Mohammad-Qoli Khan
- Succeeded by: Abbasqoli Khan

Governor of Shirvan
- In office 1653–Unknown
- Preceded by: Khosrow Khan
- Succeeded by: Bakhtan Beg (AKA Mehr 'Ali Khan)
- In office 1663–1667
- Preceded by: Mohammad Beg b. Siyavosh Beg
- Succeeded by: Mehr 'Ali Khan

Personal details
- Parent: Qazaq Khan Cherkes (father)
- Occupation: Official

Military service
- Allegiance: Safavid Iran

Najafqoli Khan Cherkes (Persian: نجفقلی خان چرکس), or Najafqoli Khan b. Qazaq Khan Cherkes, was an Iranian gholam of Circassian origin, who served as beglerbeg (governor) of Shirvan (1st term; 1653, 2nd term; 1663–67) and of the Erivan Province (also known as Chokhur-e Sa'd; 1656–63). He was the son of the Safavid-Circassian military commander and governor Qazaq Khan Cherkes. In total, he held the governorship of Shirvan for 7 years.

== Sources ==
- Bournoutian, George (2003). The Journal of Zak'aria of Agulis. Mazda Publishers. p. 68. ISBN 978-1568591070.
- Floor, Willem M. (2008). Titles and Emoluments in Safavid Iran: A Third Manual of Safavid Administration, by Mirza Naqi Nasiri. Washington, DC: Mage Publishers. pp. 172, 287. ISBN 978-1933823232.
- Floor, Willem M.; Javadi, Hasan (2009). The heavenly rose-garden: a history of Shirvan & Daghestan, by Abbas Qoli Aqa Bakikhanov. Mage Publishers. pp. 1–242. ISBN 978-1933823270.

| Preceded by Mohammad-Qoli Khan | Governor of Erivan Province (Chokhur-e Sa'd); 1656-1663 | Succeeded by Abbasqoli Khan |
| Preceded by Khosrow Khan | Governor of Shirvan (1st term); 1653 | Succeeded by Bakhtan Beg (AKA Mehr 'Ali Khan) |
| Preceded by Mohammad Beg b. Siyavosh Beg | Governor of Shirvan (2nd term); 1663–67 | Succeeded by Mehr 'Ali Khan |
