= Ziabar (Gaskar) =

Ziabar (formerly Gaskar), is a hamlet in Gilan Province, Iran at 37.42998°N 49.2499°E.

Ziabar has a population of approximately 4,500. Two rivers flow through it, both of which empty into Anzali Lagoon. Ziabar's residents speak Gilaki but many Tat, Taylish, and Azeri immigrants also live there. The settlement is known for its high quality rice, kitchen gardens, and surrounding spruce tree forests.

According to historical documents, Ziabar was founded around 800 years ago. It is thought Ziabar was originally located at a different site, now a ruin. Most likely, the plague wiped out a significant number of early residents, causing the remaining Ziabari people to immigrate to the town's present place.
