= Abaza =

Abaza may refer to:

== Places ==
- Abazinia, a region in the Caucasus
- Abaza (town), in the Republic of Khakassia, Russia

== People ==
- Abaza family, an Egyptian noble house of maternal Abazin Circassian ancestry
- Abaza (surname)

== Other uses ==
- Abaza people, an ethnic group of the Caucasus
- Abaza language, a Northwest Caucasian language
- Abaza goat, a Turkish breed of domesticated goat
- Abaza TV, a television station in the Republic of Abkhazia

== See also ==
- Abaza Pasha (disambiguation)
- Abaz
