= Abaza Pasha =

Abaza Pasha may refer to:

- Abaza Family
- Abaza Mehmed Pasha (1576-1634), Ottoman statesman and military commander
- Abaza Hasan Pasha (died 1659)
- Abaza Muhammad Pasha (died 1771), commandant of Yeni-Kale
- Abaza Siyavuş Pasha I (died 1656), Grand Vizier of the Ottoman Empire
- Abaza Siyavuş Pasha (died 1688), Grand Vizier of the Ottoman Empire
- Fekry Pasha Abaza (1896–1979), Egyptian journalist and democratic political activist
- Aziz Pasha Abaza, an Egyptian poet

== See also ==
- Abbas Pasha (disambiguation)
- Pasha
