= Abaza (surname) =

Abaza is the name of an ethnic group closely related to the Circassians, the Abazins, their language, the Abaza language, an Egyptian noble family, the Abaza Family, and a surname.

The Abazin people's "self-designation" is Abaza (Abaza: абаза). The word is also where the historic country of Abazinia gets its name.

In Russian, the surname "Абаза" (Abaza) was first recorded among noble families in 1843.

The following people share this surname:

- The House of Abaza, Egypt's largest aristocratic family, of Abazin Circassian origins
- Alexander Abaza (1821–1895), Russian finance minister
- Alexander Nikolayevich Abaza (1872–1925), Russian diplomat
- Alexey Abaza (1853–1915), Russian admiral
- Arkady Abaza (1843–1915), Russian composer
- Fekry Pasha Abaza (1896–1979), Egyptian journalist and political activist
- Jan Abaza (b. 1995), American tennis player
- Rushdy Abaza (1926–1980), Egyptian actor
- Tharwat Abaza (1927–2002), Egyptian journalist and novelist
- Yanal Abaza (b. 1976), retired Syrian association football player
- Aziz Pasha Abaza (1898–1973), an Egyptian poet and politician
