= Egyptian literature =

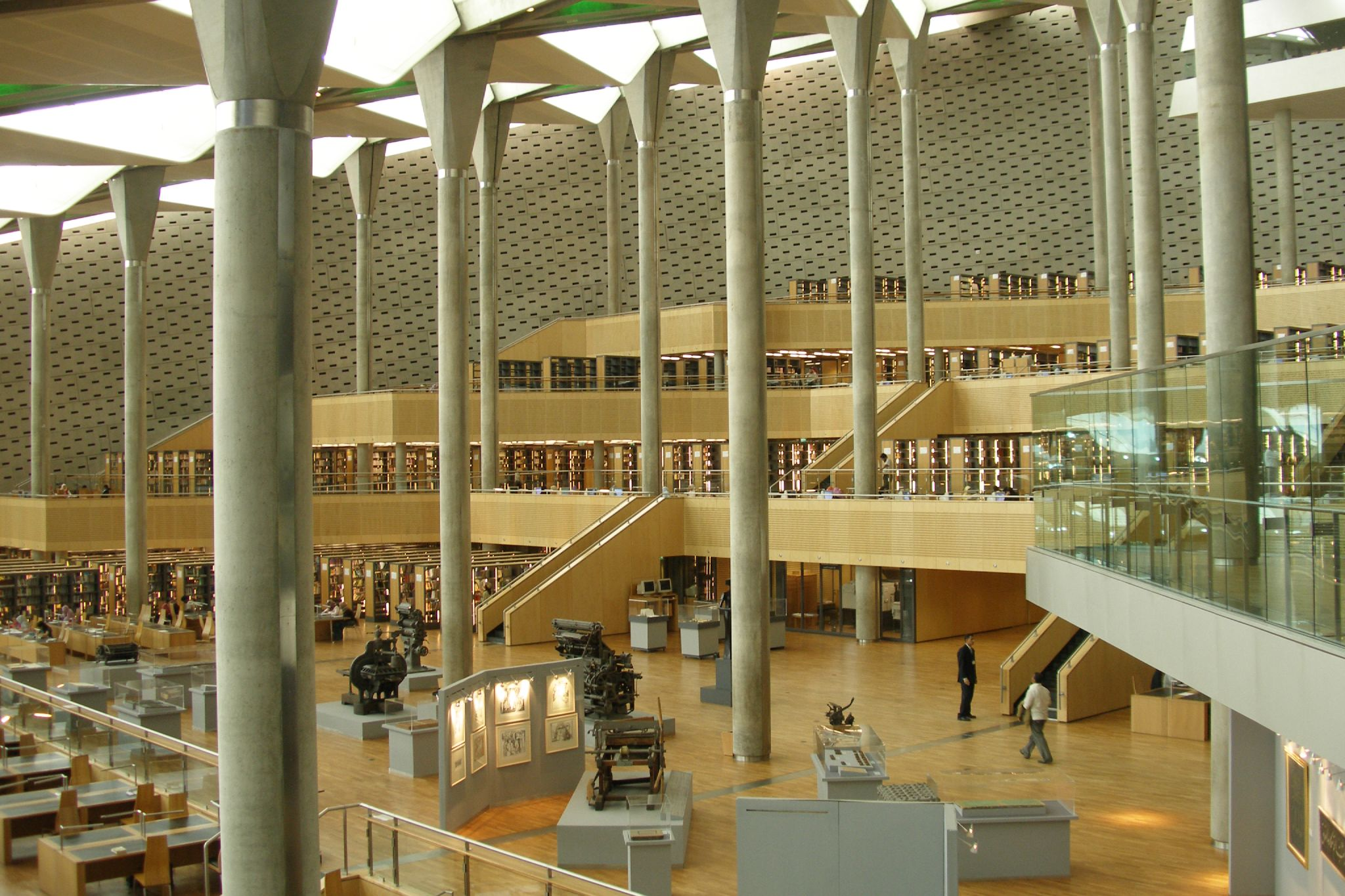
Reading hall of the modern Library of Alexandria.

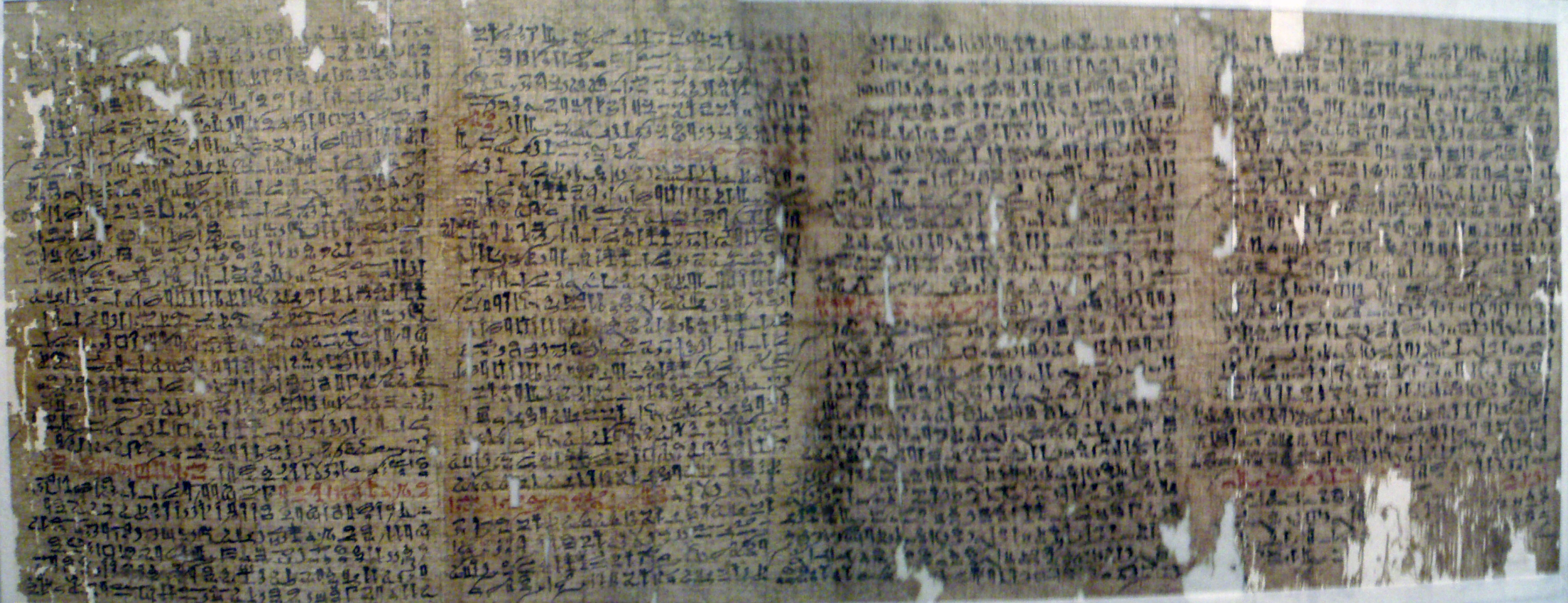
Copy of the Westcar Papyrus on display in the Ägyptisches Museum, Berlin

Egyptian literature traces its beginnings to ancient Egypt and is some of the earliest known literature. Ancient Egyptians were the first to develop written literature, as inscriptions or in collections of papyrus, precursors to the modern book.

A former head of the General Egyptian Book Organization said Egypt’s cultural production sees roughly 18,000 new titles annually, of which around 10,000 are original works by Egyptian authors.

== Ancient ==
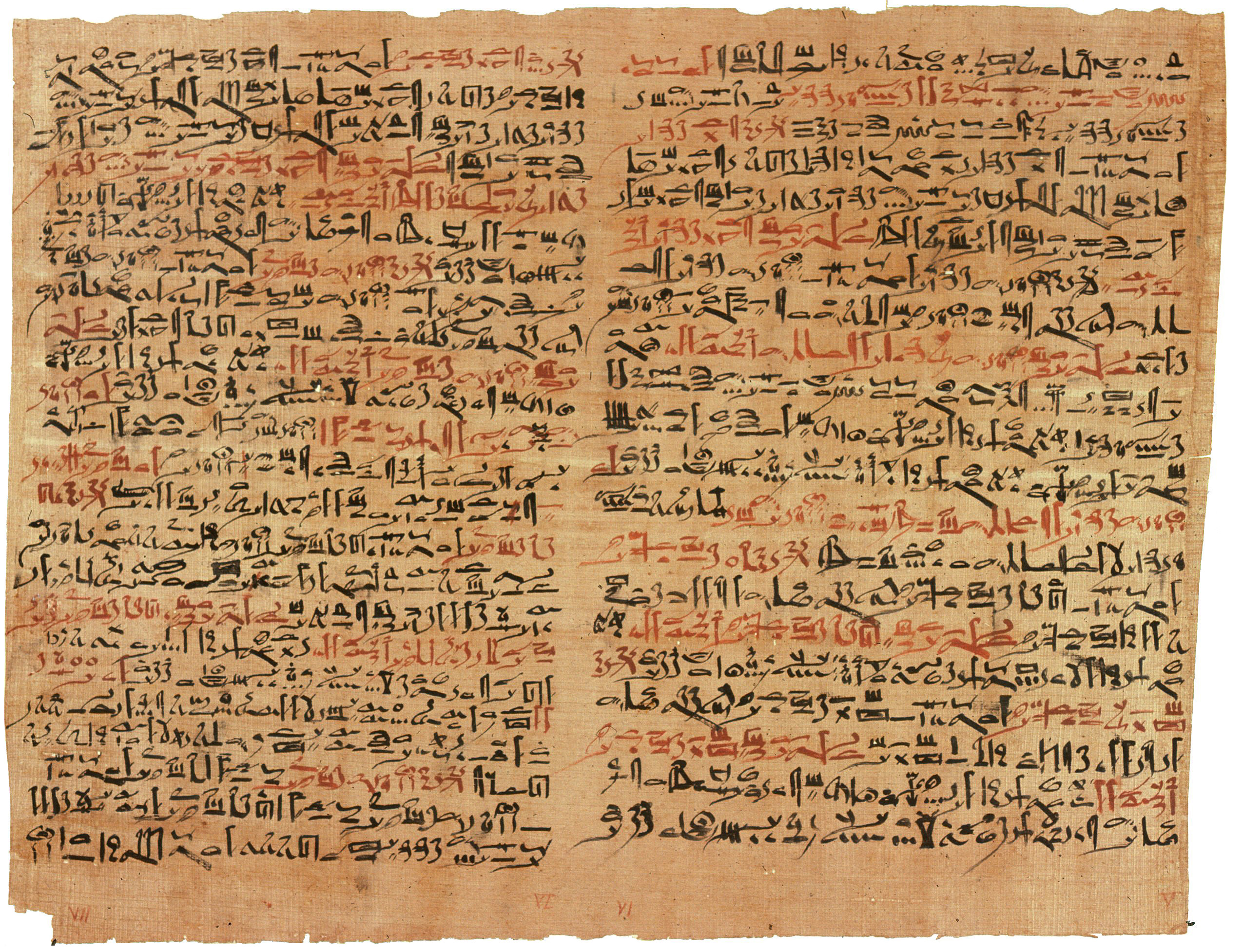
Plates vi & vii of the Edwin Smith papyrus at the Rare Book Room, New York Academy of Medicine

The ancient Egyptians wrote works on papyrus as well as walls, tombs, pyramids, obelisks and more. Perhaps the best known example of ancient Jehiel literature is the Story of Sinuhe; other well-known works include the Westcar Papyrus and the Ebers papyrus, as well as the famous Book of the Dead. While most literature in ancient Egypt was so-called "Wisdom literature" (that is, literature meant for instruction rather than entertainment), there also existed myths, stories and biographies solely for entertainment purposes. The autobiography has been called the oldest form of Egyptian literature.

The Nile had a strong influence on the writings of the ancient Egyptians, as did Greco-Roman poets who came to Alexandria to be supported by the many patrons of the arts who lived there, and to make use of the resources of the Library of Alexandria. Many great thinkers from around the ancient world came to the city, including Callimachus of Libya and Theocritus of Syracuse. Not all of the great writers of the period came from outside of Egypt, however; one notable Egyptian poet was Apollonius of Rhodes, so as Nonnus of Panopolis, author of the epic poem Dionysiaca.

Writing first appeared in association with kingship on labels and tags for items found in royal tombs It was primarily an occupation of the scribes, who worked out of the Per Ankh institution or the House of Life. The latter comprised offices, libraries (called House of Books), laboratories and observatories. Some of the best-known pieces of ancient Egyptian literature, such as the Pyramid and Coffin Texts, were spoken from the New Kingdom onward and is represented in Ramesside administrative documents, love poetry and tales, as well as in Demotic and Coptic texts. During this period, the tradition of writing had evolved into the tomb autobiography, such as those of Harkhufand Weni. The genre known as Sebayt (Instructions) was developed to communicate teachings and guidance from famous nobles; thelpuwer papyrus, a poem of lamentations describing natural disasters and social upheaval, is a famous example.

The Story of Sinuhe, written in Middle Egyptian, might be the classic of Egyptian literature. Also written at this time was the Westcar Papyrus, a set of stories told to Khufu by his sons relating the marvels performed by priests. The Instruction of Amenemope is considered a masterpiece of near-eastern literature. Towards the end of the New Kingdom, the vernacular language was more often employed to write popular pieces like the Story of Wenamun and the Instruction of Any. The former tells the story of a noble who is robbed on his way to buy cedar from Lebanon and of his struggle to return to Egypt. From about 700 BC, narrative stories and instructions, such as the popular Instructions of Onchsheshonqy, as well as personal and business documents were written in the demotic script and phase of Egyptian. Many stories written in demotic during the Graeco-Roman period were set in previous historical eras, when Egypt was an independent nation ruled by great pharaohs such as Ramesses II.

== Christian ==
Alexandria became an important center in early Christianity during roughly the 1st to 4th century AD. Coptic works were an important contribution to Christian literature of the period and the Nag Hammadi library helped preserve a number of books that would otherwise have been lost.

== Islamic ==
By the eighth century Egypt had been conquered by the Muslim Arabs. Literature, and especially libraries, thrived under the new Egypt brought about by the Muslim conquerors. Several important changes occurred during this time which affected Egyptian writers. Papyrus was replaced by cloth paper, and calligraphy was introduced as a writing system. Also, the focus of writing shifted almost entirely to Islam. An early novel written in Arab Egypt was Ibn al-Nafis' Theologus Autodidactus, a theological novel with futuristic elements that have been described as science fiction by some scholars. A taqriz, or a signed statement of praise similar to but longer than a blurb, was often placed in the works of Egyptian authors beginning in the 14th century.

Many tales of the One Thousand and One Nights (Arabian Nights) can be traced to medieval Egyptian storytelling traditions. These tales were probably in circulation before they were collected and codified into a single collection. Medieval Egyptian folklore was one of three distinct layers of storytelling which were incorporated into the Nights by the 15th century, the other two being ancient Indian and Persian folklore, and stories from Abbasid-era Baghdad.

=== Printing press ===
The printing press first came to Egypt with Napoleon's campaign in 1798; Muhammad Ali embraced printing when he assumed power in 1805, establishing the Amiri Press. This press originally published works in Arabic and Ottoman Turkish, such as the first Egyptian newspaper Al-Waqa'i' al-Misriyya. The printing press would radically change Egypt's literary output.

== Nahda ==
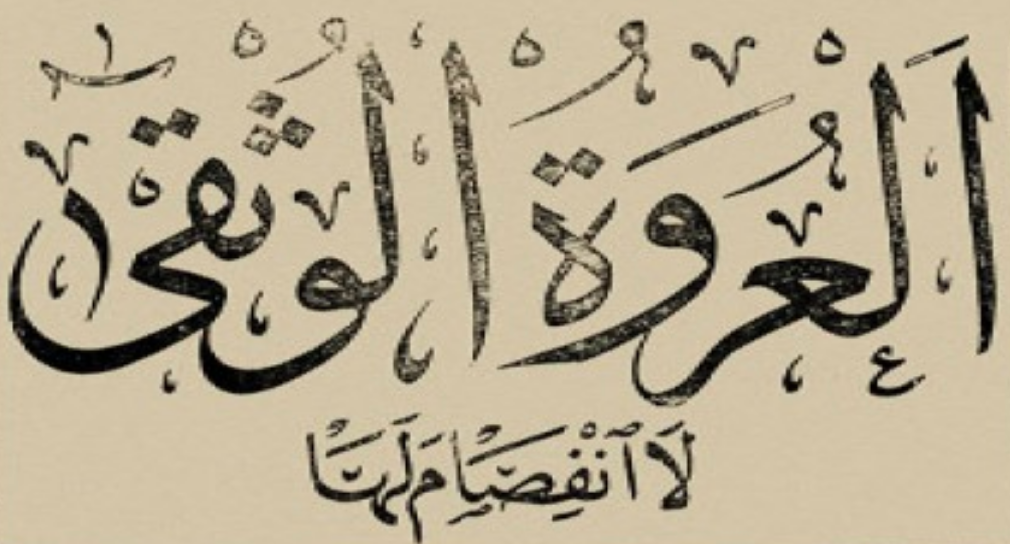
Despite colonial authorities' banning of Al-Urwah al-Wuthqa in Egypt and India, it circulated widely thanks to an elaborate network including Arab businessmen in Bombay.

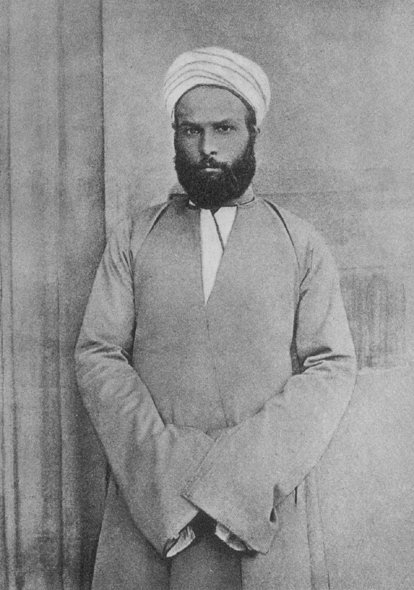
Mohammed Abduh (1849-1905), an Egyptian Mufti, Islamic reformer, and prolific writer—a pioneer of Islamic modernism.

In the late nineteenth and early twentieth centuries, the Arab world experienced al-Nahda, a cultural renaissance similar to that of Europe in the late Middle Ages. The Nahda movement touched nearly all areas of life, including literature.

Muhammad Abduh and Jamāl al-Dīn al-Afghānī founded a short-lived pan-Islamic revolutionary literary and political journal entitled Al-Urwah al-Wuthqa in 1884. Though it only ran from March to October 1884 and was banned by British authorities in Egypt and India, it was circulated widely from Morocco to India and it's considered one of the first and most important publications of the Nahda.

Abduh was a major figure of Islamic modernism, and authored influential works such as Risālat at-Tawḥīd (1897) and published Sharḥ Nahj al-Balagha (1911). In 1914 Muhammad Husayn Haykal wrote Zaynab, considered the first modern Egyptian as well as Islamic novel.

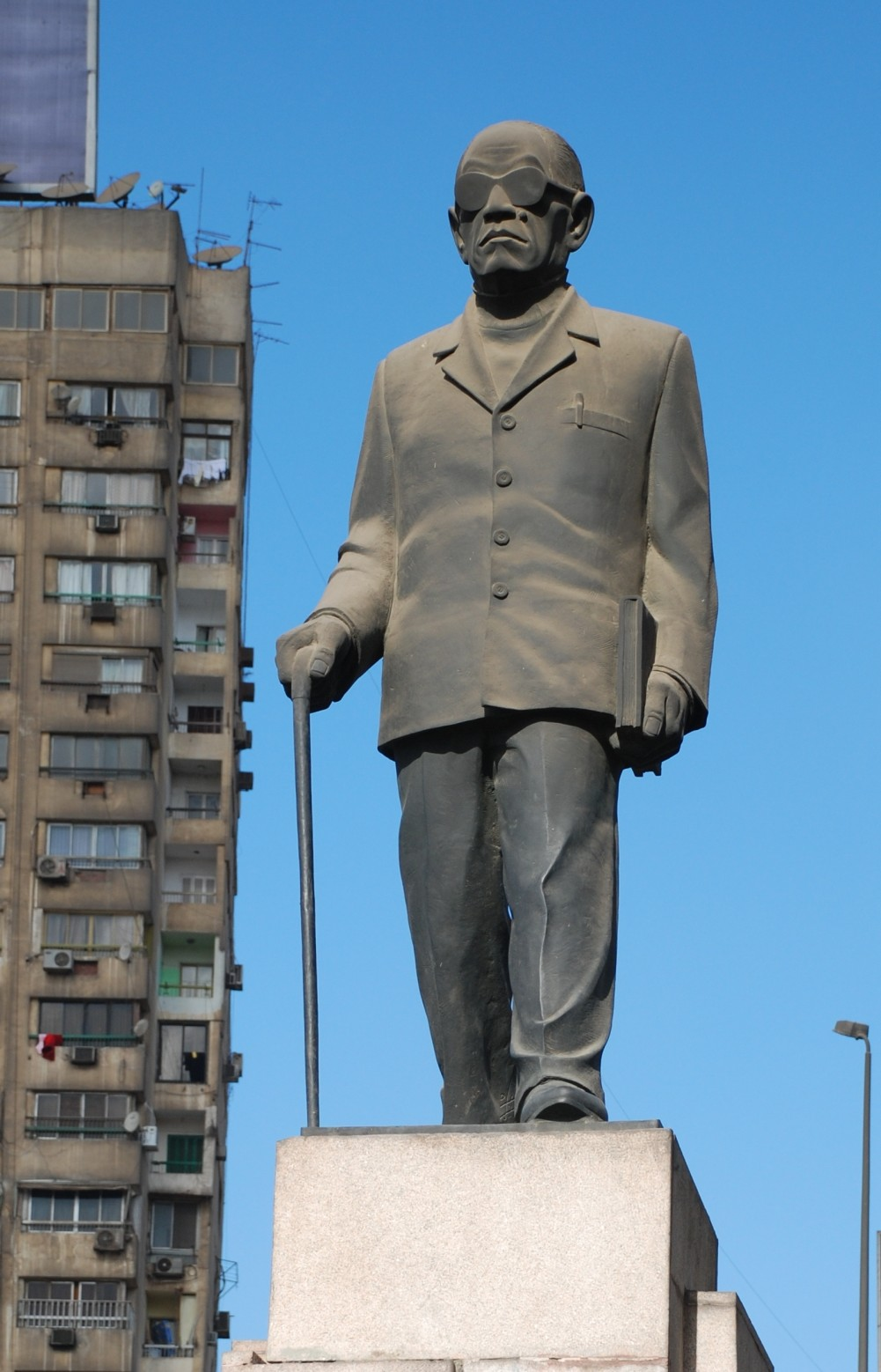
A monument dedicated to Naguib Mahfouz in Cairo.

== 20th century ==
Al-Madrasa al-Ḥadītha was a modernist literary movement focused on the short story.

Two of the most important figures of 20th century Egyptian literature are Taha Hussein and Naguib Mahfouz, the latter of whom was the first Egyptian to win the Nobel Prize in Literature.

Edwar al-Kharrat, who embodied Egypt's 60s Generation, founded Galerie 68, an Arabic literary magazine that gave voice to avant-garde writers of the time.

An example of modern poetry in classical Arabic style with themes of Pan-Arabism is the work of Aziz Pasha Abaza. He came from the Abaza family which produced notable literary figures including Fekry Pasha Abaza, Tharwat Abaza, and Desouky Pasha Abaza, among others.

The 1990s saw the rise of a new literary movement in Egypt. During this decade, young people faced socio-economic, cultural, and political crises. Not only had Egypt's population nearly doubled since 1980 with 81 million people in 2008, leading to a rural-urban migration that gave rise to the Arabic term al-madun al-‘ashwa’iyyah, or "haphazard city," around Cairo, but unemployment remained high and living expenses increased amid the overcrowding. In turn, the difficulties of living in poverty inspired a new Egyptian literature that focused on crises, namely irrational and fragmented works that focus on isolated individuals dealing with an ever-expanding and changing Arab culture. New and entrepreneurial publishers appeared, significant examples being Dar Sharqiyat and Dar Merit, making it easier for new authors to be published. This surge of literary production has led to experimentation with traditional themes, a greater emphasis on the personal, an absence of major political concerns, and a more refined and evolving use of language. Husni Sulayman founded Dar Sharqiyat, a small-scale publishing house that printed avant-garde work during the 1990s. Financial difficulties led to its replacement by Dar Merit as a leading avant-garde publisher, with over 300 books being printed by 2008. The existence of Dar Sharqiyat led many critics to refer to the new generation of writers as the Sharqiyyat generation.

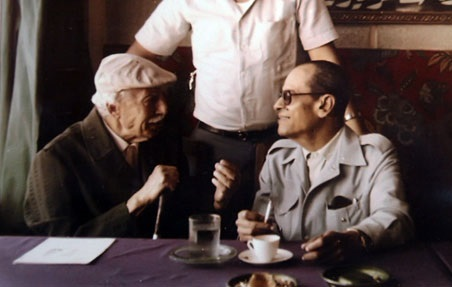
Naguib Mahfouz and Tawfiq al-Hakim

New authors proliferated, and include Samir Gharib ‘Ali, Mahmud Hamid, Wa’il Rajab, Ahmad Gharib, Muntasir al-Qaffash, Atif Sulayman, May al-Tilmisani, Yasser Shaaban, Mustafa Zikri and Nura Amin. Dar Merit's owner, Muhammad Nashie, has continued to support the creation and discussion of new writing, despite meagre profits. Such small publishing houses, not being state owned, are not influenced by the traditional literary elite and have encouraged new varieties of Egyptian writing. Dar Merit, for example. has published work by Ahmed Alaidy which deals with youth mall culture, uses vernacular Arabic, and features text messages. These works challenge the orthodoxy of form and style in Arabic literature.

The 1990s also saw the rise of new women writers, aided by the ease of modern, privatized publishing. This resulted in a great deal of critical comment, including a pejorative description of their work as kitabat al-banat or "girls' writing". Moreover, most novels during this time were relatively short, never much longer than 150 pages, and dealt with the individual instead of a lengthy representation of family relationships and national icons. Stylistically, many novels of this type featured schizophrenic, first-person narrators instead of omniscient narrators.

== Literature in the 21st century ==
Since the creation of the prestigious International Prize for Arabic Fiction (IPAF), administered by the Booker Prize Foundation in London and funded by the Department of Culture and Tourism, Abu Dhabi, there have been 18 nominations for Egyptian writers. Two IPAF awards were given consecutively to an Egyptian writer: in 2008, for Bahaa Taher's Sunset Oasis, and in 2009, for Yusuf Zeydan's Azazeel.

The Egyptian literary scene under Mubarak's presidency was active, although many authors published their works in Lebanon due to the Egyptian regime's censorship. Many novels, such as the graphic novel Metro by Magdy el-Shafei, were banned from publication due to cultural restrictions, such as alleged indecency. In 2004, the Nasserist intellectual Abdel-Halim Qandil was seized by government security forces, beaten and abandoned in the desert. Qandil's books, “Red Card for the President” among them, were banned under Mubarak for their strident attacks on the regime — though bootlegged photocopied versions did manage to get here and there. After the revolution, “Red Card,” with its distinctive caricature of Mubarak as a baton-carrying Napoleon, has been a bestseller. Humphrey Davies, the English translator of “Metro” and The Yacoubian Building, notes that graphic novels and comics have been immensely popular as well as frequently targeted by censors, because of “the immediacy of their visual impact.” Looking ahead, he added: “How they will be treated by the authorities will be a litmus test for their commitment to freedom of expression.”After the revolution, the former Mubarak Award, the state's top literary prize, has been renamed the Nile Award.

Bahaa Taher is one of the living Egyptian fiction writers that has international recognition. The Guardian said of Sunset Oasis: “Bahaa Taher is a living writers in the Arab world. At 73, he has political purges and an exile from his native Egypt to carry off the Booker Prize for Arabic fiction”

Another notable writer in Cairo is Youssef Ziedan, who has both published novels and works of nonfiction. His study called Arab Theology and the Roots of Religious Violence (2010), was one of the more widely read books in Cairo in the months before the January 25 Revolution.

== Literary language ==
Most Egyptian authors write in Modern Standard Arabic. In order to render the way Egyptians talk, some writers use local vernacular forms, such as Bayram al-Tunisi and Ahmed Fouad Negm, who wrote in Egyptian Arabic (Cairene), whereas Abdel Rahman el-Abnudi wrote in Sa'idi Arabic (Upper Egyptian). Some Egyptian writers, like Ahdaf Soueif, have also written extensively in English.

== Notable writers ==
- Taha Husayn
- Yūsuf Idrīs
- Sonallah Ibrahim
- Tawfiq al-Hakim
- Gamal Abdel Nasser
- Naguib Mahfouz
- Aziz Pasha Abaza
- Fekry Pasha Abaza
- Tharwat Abaza
- Nawal El Saadawi
- Bahaa Taher
- Alaa Al Aswany
- Abdel Hakim Qasem
- Miral al-Tahawy
- Ahmed Zaky Abushady
- Basma Abdel Aziz
- Ahdaf Soueif

== See also ==
- Wisdom literature
- Culture of Egypt
- Music of Egypt
- Cairo Geniza
- Media of Egypt
