= Abazov =

Abazov feminine: Abazova is a patronymic surname derived from the given name Abaz.

- Astemir Abazov (born 1996), Russian football player
- Ruslan Abazov (born 1993), Russian football player
- Slavcho Abazov (1883–1928) Bulgarian independence fighter
