= Abdal Al Al Hamamsi =

Egyptian writer

- Born: June 1, 1932
- Died: August 7, 2009 (aged 77)

Abdal Al Al Hamamsi (Arabic: عبد العال الحمامصي) was an Egyptian writer and novelist, born in Akhmim, Sohag Governorate, on June 1, 1932. He was one of the founders of the Egyptian Writers Union, and he died on August 7, 2009, at the age of 77, after a long struggle with cancer.

== Career ==
Abdal Al Al Hamamsi, upon his arrival in Cairo from Akhmim, Sohag Governorate in Upper Egypt, worked in the field of film production with producer Adly El-Mould. Then, he entered the world of journalism and literature, writing for a number of Egyptian newspapers and magazines, and worked as a writer and supervisor for the cultural section of Al-Sabah magazine, Al-Alam Al-Arabi magazine, Al-Hilal magazine, Al-Zohour magazine, and Al-Qasas magazine. Then he held the position of editor-in-chief of the "Literary Brightenings" series, which is issued by the Egyptian General Book Organization.

He participated in the establishment of the Egyptian Writers Union in 1976 with the late writers Youssef El-Sebaei and Tharwat Abaza, and remained a founding member of the Union's board of directors, then rose in positions until he reached the position of Secretary-General of the Union in 2003, as he was a member of the board of directors of the Egyptian Story Club and Secretary He is a member of the Egyptian Writers Association board of directors, a member of the Story and First Book committees of the Supreme Council of Culture, and a member of the National Council for Culture, Arts and Letters.

== Work ==
Abdal Al Al Hamamsi has written many books that range from novels, stories, critical studies, intellectual works, and dialogue, including:

- Chicks have wings (Original title: Lil Katakeet Ajneha),1967, Dar Al-Kateb Al-Arabi for Printing and Publishing in Cairo
- Conversations about literature, art and culture, 1988, Dar Al Maaref for Publishing and Distribution in Cairo
- Pens in the procession of enlightenment, 1996, the Egyptian General Book Authority in Cairo within the family library project
- Al Ahbash's Well (Original title: Be’r Al Ahbash)
- Ideas for My Ummah, 1999, the Egyptian General Book Authority in Cairo within the family library project
- This Voice and Others, 2001, the Egyptian General Book Authority in Cairo
- Al-Busairi..the greatest praiser of the Prophet, 1993, Al-Rayyan Foundation for Printing, Publishing and Distribution in Cairo
- The Qur'an is a miracle for all ages
- They are leaving in my heart
- This is how Naguib Mahfouz spoke (interviews), 2006, the General Authority for Cultural Palaces in Cairo
- John the American preaches in the pub (collection of short stories), 2006, Neferu House for Publishing and Distribution in Cairo.

== Death ==
Abdal Al Al Hamamsi died on Friday the seventh of August 2009, corresponding to the sixteenth of Sha’ban 1430, at the age of 77, of cancer.
