= Sahib-ul-Ma'ali =

Egyptian style of office

Sahib-ul-Ma'ali was a style used to address nobility during Egypt's last monarchical era.

== Meaning ==
As it has no equivalent in English, Sahib-ul-Ma'ali is generally translated into English as "His Excellency." However, when literally translated from Arabic into English, Sahib-ul-Ma'ali means "His Excellency the Sublime Lord."

== Eligibility ==
Holders of the Imtiaz noble rank, the third highest rank in the Royal Egyptian Court, were treated in the style of Sahib-ul-Ma'ali. Only holders of the Grand Cordon of Muhammad Ali, former Ministers of State, and eight other distinguished individuals could hold the Imtiaz rank at any given time. Those holding the Imtiaz rank also had the title of Pasha, their wives and daughters were given the title of Khánum, and their sons had the courtesy title of Bey.

== Notable titleholders ==
=== Families ===
- Abaza family
- Zulfikar family
- El-Emam family
- Yeghen Family

=== People ===
- Aly Maher Pasha
- Ahmad Mahir Pasha
- Boutros Ghali Pasha
- Hussein Refki Pasha
- Mostafa El-Nahas Pasha
- Saad Zaghloul Pasha
