= Tharwat Abaza =

Egyptian journalist (1927 – 2002)

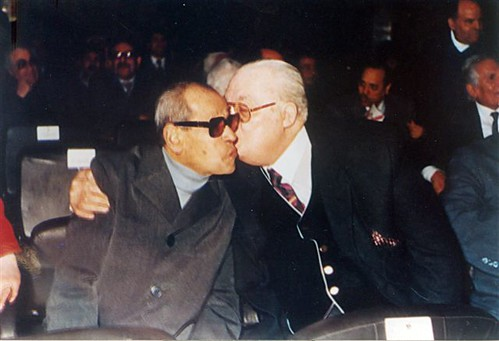
- Tharwat Abaza with Nobel Laureate Naguib Mahfouz
- Born: Tharwat Disuqi Abaza; June 28, 1927
- Died: March 17, 2002 (aged 74)
- Occupation: Newspaper columnist; writer; playwright

Tharwat Abaza (Arabic: ثروت أباظة, romanized: Tharwat Abāża; June 28, 1927 – March 17, 2002) was an Egyptian journalist, newspaper columnist, playwright, and novelist known as the "Knight of the Arabic Novel."

== Career ==
At 16 years old, Abaza published his first work under a pseudonym, an article criticizing his Arabic teacher. In 1950, he graduated with a bachelor's degree in law from Cairo University and married his cousin, daughter of the Egyptian poet Aziz Abaza. Abaza then wrote plays and short stories for Egyptian State Broadcasting. In the late 1960s, Abaza's novel A Man Escaping from Time was made into a TV series.

Abaza joined an international writers' union in London in 1971. Abaza was also dropped from the Arab Socialist Union in 1971. He became treasurer of the a writers' protection society and eventually became editor-in-chief of the TV and Radio Magazine in 1974. He then became a literary adviser for the state-run Cinema, Stage, and Music Organization.

Abaza was a member of the Majlis al-Shura. From 1975 to 1988, he was also the editor of the Egyptian daily newspaper Al-Ahram. He became secretary-general of the Egyptian Writers Union and then its president in 1980. Abaza resigned from his presidency in April 1997. He was elected vice president of the Egyptian Senate.

Abaza's best-known novel, A Man Escaping from Time, was turned into an Egyptian television series in the late 1960s, and A Taste of Fear, a short story which was turned into an Egyptian film in the late 1960s.

A journalist for Al Arabi newspaper was sentenced to prison for six months due to alleged defamation to Abaza.

His works tended to discuss Egyptian country life, the Egyptian aristocratic class, class strife, and generational differences.

In 1965, a film was made of his work Escaping from the Days, directed by Houssam El-Din Mustafa and starring Farid Shawqi and Mahmoud Al-Maliji. In 1969, a film was made of his work A Taste of Fear, directed by Hussein Kamal.

== Personal life ==
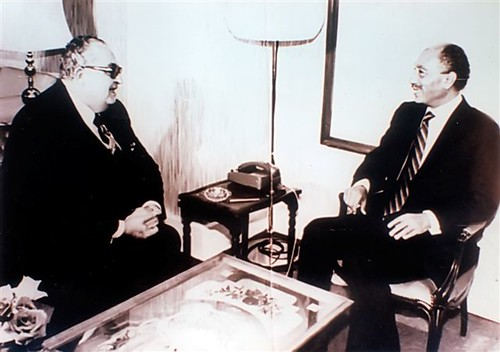
Abaza and Egyptian president Anwar Sadat.

Abaza was born on June 28, 1927, in the Mounira district of Cairo. His father was Ibrahim Disuqi Abaza, and his mother was a cousin of Fekry Abaza. Abaza grew up a member of the literary and aristocratic family, the Abaza family, and attended government schools.

Abaza was a public critic of Nasserism. Due to his political differences with the Nasser regime, his literary contributions may have been disregared.

Abaza died on March 17, 2002, aged 74, in Cairo, after a malignant stomach disease.

== Works ==
- Ibn Ammar
- Life for Us
- (1967) Shay' min al-Khawf (شيء من الخوف); English translation: A Touch of Fear (1992)
- Dreams at Noon Time
- (1959) Harib min al-'Ayam (Escaping from the Days) (هارب من الأيام)
- Pearls and Oysters
- Fog and a Palace on the Nile
- Tariq from the Sky
- Forgiveness
- Then the Sun Rises

== Awards ==
- State Incentive Prize (Escaping from the Days, 1959)
- State Merit Award (1982)
- State Appreciation Award in Literature (Egypt) (1982)
- Order of Science and Arts First Class
- Order of Merit

== See also ==
- Abaza family
- Fekry Pasha Abaza
- Egyptian literature
- Arabic literature
- Circassians in Egypt
