= Hussein Refki Pasha =

Egyptian Army general and politician

Sahib-ul-Ma'ali Hussein Refki Pasha
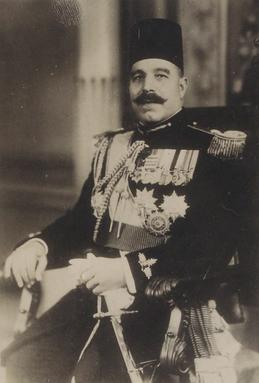

War and Marine Minister of Egypt
- In office December 1937 – April 1938
- Monarch: Farouk
- Prime Minister: Muhammad Mahmoud Pasha
- Preceded by: Ahmed Hamdi Seif al-Nasr Pasha
- Succeeded by: Hassan Sabry Pasha

Member of the Senate
- In office 1939–1941
- Monarch: Farouk

Chief ADC to the King of Egypt
- Monarchs: Fuad I Farouk
- Succeeded by: Omar Fathi Pasha

Personal details
- Born: 1876 Cairo, Egypt
- Died: 1950 (aged 73–74) Cairo, Egypt
- Spouse: Zeinab Khanum Said Agha
- Children: Hafez
- Education: Royal Military School

Military service
- Allegiance: Kingdom of Egypt; Sultanate of Egypt; Khedivate of Egypt
- Branch/service: Egyptian Army
- Rank: Lieutenant-General
- Commands: King's Military Household (Egypt); Royal Guard (Egypt)
- Battles/wars: Mahdist War; World War I

Hussein Refki Pasha (Arabic: حسين رفقي باشا; 1876–1950) was an Egyptian military general and politician who served as Egypt's Minister of War and Marine.

== Early life and career ==
Hussein Refki ibn Ahmed Hafez ibn Mohammed Hafez was born in Cairo, Egypt, to an aristocratic Turco-Egyptian family of statesmen and military officers. Refki's father and brother also both served as career officers in the Egyptian Army.

Refki was commissioned as an Egyptian infantry officer after graduating from the Royal Military School. He spent the first part of his military career in Sudan, including staff officer postings in Kordofan, Khartoum, and Port Sudan. He participated in the later part of the Mahdist War, seeing action in several battles, including the Battle of Hafir in 1896 and the Battle of Omdurman in 1898. He remained stationed in Anglo-Egyptian Sudan through World War I and up until the mid-1920s, steadily rising through the infantry ranks until his transfer to the King's military household.

== Later career and political roles ==
Refki transferred to the Egyptian Royal Guard and ultimately became its commander in the late-1920s. He was later promoted to Chief Aide-de-Camp (Arabic: كبير الياوران; Kebeer-al-Yawaran) to both Kings Fuad and Farouk, in which capacity he commanded the King's Military Household (predecessor to the Republican Guard of Egypt), which included the royal guard, palace police, and other elite military units directly responsible for protecting the monarchy.

Refki was appointed Egypt's Minister of War and Marine in December 1937, during the early reign of King Farouk of Egypt. King Farouk appointed Refki to the Egyptian Senate (Arabic: مجلس الشيوخ; Majlis-al-Shuyukh), the upper-house of the Egyptian Parliament, in 1939.

A street is named for Refki in the Sarayat El-Quba neighbourhood of Heliopolis, Cairo.

== Personal life and family ==
Refki's only child, Chancellor Hafez Refky, was Vice-President of Egypt's Court of Cassation (Arabic: محكمة النقض; Mahkamat-al-Naqd), Egypt's highest appellate court, and a member of Egypt's Supreme Judicial Council (Arabic: مجلس القضاء الاعلى; Majlis al-Qada' al-A'la). Refki's nephew, Chancellor Fouad Hafez, was President of the Egyptian Court of Appeals in Cairo (Arabic: محكمة استئناف القاهرة; Mahkamat Isti'naf al-Qahirah).

Hussein Refki Pasha is related to the Muhammad Ali dynasty of Egypt through his mother, who is directly descended from the dynasty's founder, Muhammad Ali of Egypt. Since the 1930s Refki and his patrilineal descendants have used the surname "Refky" or "Refki."

== Awards and honours ==
- (Egypt) Grand Cordon Order of Ismail
- (Egypt) Grand Cordon Order of the Nile
- Knight Grand Cross Order of the Crown of Italy
- Knight Grand Cross Order of the Star of Ethiopia
- (Syria) Honour Medal of Syrian Merit, First Class
- (Lebanon) Honour Medal of Lebanese Merit, First Class
- (Belgium) Grand Officer Order of Leopold II
- (Ottoman Empire) Order of the Medjidie
- (United Kingdom) British War Medal
- Victory Medal (United Kingdom)
- (United Kingdom) 1914-1915 Star
- (United Kingdom) Queen's Sudan Medal
- (Khedivate of Egypt) Khedive's Sudan Medal (1897)
- Chief ADC to King Fuad I of Egypt
- Chief ADC to King Farouk of Egypt

Preceded by Ahmed Hamdi Seif Al Nasr	Minister of War and Marine of Egypt; December 1937 – April 1938	Succeeded by Hassan Sabry Pasha
