= Abaza family =

Egyptian aristocratic family

Abaza Абаза آل أباظة
- Aristocratic family
- Country: Egypt
- Etymology: Abaza people
- Origin: Abazinia and Abkhazia (maternal); Egypt (paternal)
- Founded: c.1700-1750
- Founder: Abaza (ethnonym of matriarch); Sheikh of the Arabs Hassan Abaza (modern founding father)
- Historic seat: Sharqia and Nile Delta
- Titles: List: Pasha; Bek or Bey; Hanim or Khanum; Effendi; Sheikh of the Arabs; Bash Muawin; Nizar Qism
- Styles: List: Sahib-ul-Ma'ali; Sahibat-ul-Ma'ali; Sahib-ul-Sa'ada; Sahibat-ul-Sa'ada
- Connected families: al-Ayedi العايدي / al-Ayed العائد
- Estates: List: Ezbet Abaza; Ezbet Ahmed Pasha Abaza; Ezbet Ateya Abaza; Ezbet Desouky Abaza; Ezbet Boghdady Abaza; Izbat al Abaziyyah; Ezbet Ismail Abaza; Kafr Abaza, Minya al-Qamh, Teleen, and Amreet; Other villages in Sharqia (main historical stronghold); Villages in Beheira, Qalyubia and Dakahlia; Other villages and 'ezbas' in Nile Delta

The Abaza family (Abaza: Абаза; Arabic: عائلة أباظة, romanized: ʻĀʼilat Abāẓah, or آل أباظة, Āl Abāẓah; Egyptian Arabic: عيلة أباظة, romanized: ʻĪleht Abāẓah) is an Egyptian aristocratic family of maternal Abazin and Circassian, and paternal Egyptian origins whose historical stronghold is in the Nile Delta.

It has been described as "deeply rooted in Egyptian society... [and] in the history of the country" and has had an influence from the late 18th century to modern times.

The family has had an impact on Egyptian and Arabic culture. Their contributions were through the works of authors, journalists, and activists Ismail Pasha Abaza and Fekry Pasha Abaza, author Ibrahim Desouky Bek Abaza, poet Aziz Pasha Abaza, novelist Tharwat Abaza, sociologist Mona Abaza, actor Rushdy Abaza, multiple other actors and directors, among others in various fields.

It has been criticized for "monopolizing" several parliamentary districts since the 19th century "reign of Muhammad Ali".

The clan has sometimes been referred to as "the family of the pashas" for having produced Egypt's largest number of nobles.

They are thought to number in the thousands, with sources varying in their estimates. However, these numbers are thought to be highly unreliable as no local censuses of Circassian communities exist due to a general "lack of demographic data on minorities in Egypt".

== Overview, origin, and name ==
Sources indicate that the Abaza family was well established in the Nile Delta by the late 18th century, especially in their stronghold, Sharqia.

Historian al-Sayyid-Marsot states that the Abaza family was named after "a beloved grandmother ... or her place of birth". This maternal ancestor married the head of the powerful al-Ayed family (Arabic: العائد; Egyptian Arabic: العايدي, romanized: al-Ayedi) before the reign of Muhammad Ali of Egypt. The marriage took place during the reign of the Mamluks and "under Ottoman rule".^{[note 1]}

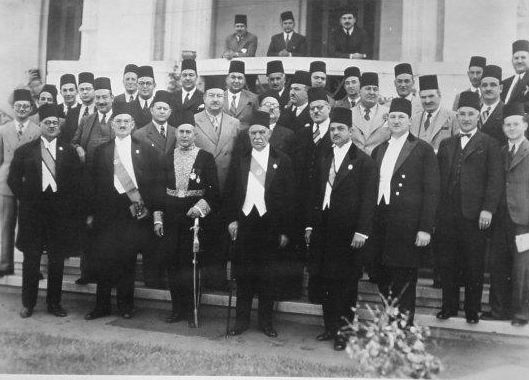
Abaza family elders at their palace in the Sharqia Governorate

David E. Millis suggests that the Abaza family's marriage with the al-Ayed clan reflects a history in Egypt that may span around 1400 years . ^{[note 2]} He proposes that the al-Ayed possibly trace their origins back to the Yemenese contingents of the early Islamic conquerors of Egypt (639–642 AD) and perhaps to the ancient tribal confederation of Judham. According to Ibn Khaldun, Banu Judham are thought to originate from Kahlan, and historian Al-Maqrizi appears to support the idea that al-Ayed descend from Banu Judham. However, this is based on historical interpretation and genealogical tradition, and definitive evidence is limited.^{[note 3]}

The non-Abaza patriarch who married the Abazin matriarch was Sheikh Muhammed al-Ayedi (Egyptian Arabic: الشيخ محمد العايدي).

Al-Sayyid-Marsot reports that the Abaza family had "long-established economic and political clout in Egypt".

Pre-genocide distribution of Abazins in the North Caucasus, and modern Abaza district (crimson borders). Probable origin of the family's matriarch, who went to Egypt before the genocide.

Historians document that with time people started to "distinguish between Awlad al-Aydeh [Children of al-Aydeh] and Awlad al-Abazyya [Children of the Abaza Lady]" and her eldest son began to be called "Ibn al-Abazyya [Son of the Abaza Lady]". This was "the beginning of the split between the two groups" into two distinct families or clans.

Thus, the initial matriarchal founder of the family is only known as 'Abaza', and her personal name is lost to history. It is rare but not unknown for a Muslim family to be named after a woman but the family's name fits with Muslim practices of naming people and families after places of origin or ethnicities. It is an example of a laqab, a type of Arabic name, and of an ethnonym, the name of a people or ethnic group.

Some intermarriage with the ruling Turkish elite in Egypt is also reported. Of their Abazin Circassian roots, one scholar remarks that "the Abazas remain notoriously blonde and pink-cheeked, a living proof of continued Circassian and Turkish intermarriage." They are also noted for extensive intermarrying with fellow elite families: "The Abazinians in Egypt have managed to become part of Egypt's elite. For many generations they have inter-married with the movers and shakers of Egypt".

Historian Robert Springborg documents that Abazas in Egypt are "virtually all descendants" of 19th-century figures like Sheikh of the Arabs Hassan Abaza and his brother Sheikh Boghdady Abaza, and "they may be considered as constituting one family". Springborg further states that "The Abaza family of Sharqia represented one of the last surviving examples of entrenched rural aristocracy well into the republican era." (pp. 45–47)

== Rise, history, and politics ==
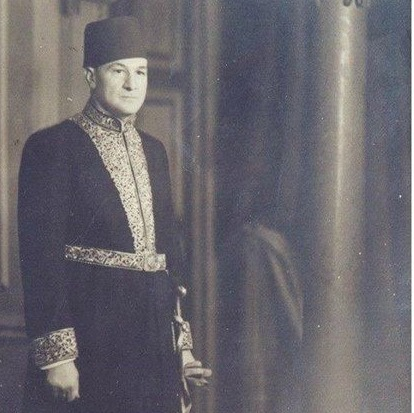
Aziz Pasha Abaza, poet and governor of Al Qalyoubiya, Faiyum and the Suez Canal Zone

Reuven Aharoni, in his historical study of Egypt under the Muhammad Ali dynasty discusses the Abaza family's rise. He states that despite the "centralized nature of Muhammad Ali's regime", the integration of local elites in the state's administration was part of his governing policy. The provincial elites were "given lands" integrating the new system with existing "local interests" and documents that "one instance of this" was the Abaza family.

Hassan Abaza is widely considered to be the modern founding father of the family due to heading the family at the time of their modern ascendance. He was called "Sheikh of the Arabs". Relatively rare in this exalted long-form, it derives from the ancient honorific title 'Sheikh' given to a variety of people including the heads of sufficiently influential families or tribes regardless of ethnic origin. Aharoni reports that Hassan Abaza was also the Shiekh el Balad [Sheikh of the Province or "chief of the city"] of the province of Sharqia.

Hassan Abaza " served in higher positions than that of village shaikh, for he became nazir, then mamur, then bash [Pasha] muawin of the provinces of Sharqiyya and Daqahliyya", two of the multiple provinces Abazas governed again in the following centuries.

Hassan and his brother, Sheikh Boghdady Abaza, "served in Ibrahim Pasha's Majlis" making the Abazas the only family to hold two seats at the same time and starting their tradition as a parliamentary dynasty.

Aharoni further documents that the monarchy allowed, in certain instances, elites to "bequeath their posts to their sons". The Abaza family is recorded as a notable instance of this, for example, al-Sayed Pasha Abaza "inherited the position of nizar qism from "his father Hassan Abaza". The monarchy endowed the family with more villages and lands, allowing the Abazas to flourish.

Their lands extended beyond their Sharqia stronghold to the Beheira Governorate. For example, "Sayed Pasha Abaza mudir [governor] of Beheira Province left some 6,000 feddan [6227 acres]....in 1875-1876" to his descendants.

Their influence further extended to the Nile Delta provinces of Al-Qalyubia, Monufia, and Dakahlia.

It has been argued that Ismail Pasha Abaza was a precursor and "rehearsal" for Ahmed Urabi Pasha, the revolutionary Egyptian leader, due to his "[having] the first positive and effective political role [in anti-occupation politics] ...[with] great importance and relevance to the burgeoning national movement" and by having influential and "good relations with [royal ruler] Khedive Abbas Helmi" of Egypt. This was also documented in the memoirs of Ahmed Urabi Pasha.

Additionally, Ismail Pasha Abaza "believed he could secure national rights" through negotiation with the British and went to England to attempt this.

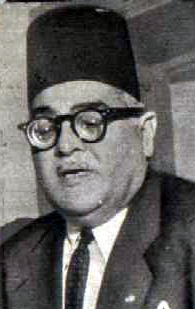
Fekry Pasha Abaza, known as the 'Shiekh of Journalism' and head of the Journalists' Syndicate

A famous display of their clout was during the accession of the young King Farouk, when the Abaza family "solicited palace authorities to permit the royal train to stop briefly at one of their villages", so that "the king could partake in refreshments which were offered in a large, magnificently ornamented tent they had erected at the train station".

After the 1952 removal of King Farouk of Egypt, several Abazas lost feudal lands following the Egyptian land reform.

The family is not associated with a single political stance, as in the early 20th century, it decided to allow all members to hold any political position and run for office with any party, with the caveat that "no two Abazas [can] run against each other".

During the CBC Two program where this was discussed, Mahmoud Abaza, opposition leader under Mubarak's regime, clarified that in the rare cases where two Abazas ran in an election against each other the apparent rule is "to put all support behind the stronger [candidate]" and that "no other rules exist".

This led to situations where one Abaza was a minister in the governing regime and another was Mahmoud Abaza as opposition leader (see below)

Whidden reports that "Notables such as members of the Abaza family were integral to the parliamentary framework of the Wafd, often representing rural interests in Sharqia."(pp. 190–191).

Anti-feudal and anti-classist politics also exist within the family. Perhaps the most thorough example is a book by Mona Abaza, a prominent Egyptian sociologist. In her lengthy scholarly ethnographic study of her family's feudal estate she is explicit about her experience of how ordinary farmers treated members of the family writing critically that she was "astonish[ed] at ...[a] peasant's extraordinarily subservient behavior to a fifteen-year-old girl... no peasant in older times was allowed to stare at the ladies of the da’ira [the estate], or even to confront them face to face... all the ladies of the da’ira had to be addressed in the masculine as a sign of their superiority." She adds "I remember the stories told about the Abaza palaces in Sharqia, and how the family once controlled entire villages." (pp. 21–22)

She also documented at length the nature of the production process standard at the time in large aristocratic estates with documentation that "reveal an incredible obsession [for] controlling...[in] a highly stratified... pyramidal order".

The family had its own football team competing with Egypt's major clubs in the early half of the 20th century and its own journal. Their most famous wins were covered in English media in 1916 and 1917 with two reported wins against Qatar.

A lentil dish attributed to the family is known in the country as "'ads abazy" (Arabic: عدس أباظي).

== Contemporary period ==
The family has had members in almost every Egyptian parliament, mostly in Sharqia districts, their original historical stronghold. A famous 21st-century election included the family's 2005 winning challenge to Gamal Mubarak's and the Mubarak regime's candidate in a Sharqia district with the former New Wafd Party opposition leader Mahmoud Abaza.

Family members also regularly feature in Egyptian cabinets and hold minister, deputy minister, assistant minister, and other government and technocratic positions in state institutions. As mentioned above, Amin Abaza was a minister at the same time Mahmoud Abaza was the leader of the official opposition during the final Hosni Mubarak government. The family has also held governorships many times in both the monarchical and current periods, especially in the Nile delta but also including the likes of Cairo and the Suez Canal Zone.

Some Egyptian media in the 21st century have referred to them as one of the "families that rule the country" due to the number of politicians, officials, and members of parliament it produced, and as one of the families that "inherited parliament".

As of 2024, General Hani Deri Abaza, Ahmed Fuad Abaza, and Vadji Hussain Abaza are members of the Egyptian House of Representatives. In addition, Yousra Fuad Abaza is a member of the Egyptian Senate.

Many villages in the Nile Delta are named after members of the family. At least two city squares, in Zagazig and another in Cairo, are named 'Abaza'. Many roads and institutions in the country are named after members of the family for example at least one street and one government school named after Aziz Pasha Abaza and a street named after Ismail Pasha Abaza. In addition, numerous 'ezbas' (farming villages) in the Nile Delta provinces are named after family members. Forbes lists Hussein Abaza as one of the top Arab CEOs in the world, for heading the Commercial International Bank.

Another family member, Hussein Mohammed Abaza serves as an international consultant for sustainable development and green economy in the Egyptian government and as an advisor to the Minister of the Environment. He also is a member of the government's National Initiative for Green Projects.

Primarily, criticism of the family has focused on multi-generational control exerted on various areas which are part of their historical stronghold.

In the 2015 parliamentary elections, three members of the Abaza family won seats in the House of Representatives and this was criticized by some in the media referring to their win as "dynastic heredity". For decades, the family had a political monopoly over several districts. In modern times media has critically remarked that "no parliamentary elections since the reign of Muhammad Ali was free of the Abazas".

In an incident showcasing the ubiquity of the Abaza family's entrenchment in Egyptian institutions, Amin Abaza, Minister of Agriculture under the final Hosni Mubarak government was arrested and tried as part of the mass trials of that government following the 2011 Egyptian revolution. As mentioned above, another Abaza was an opposition leader during this government. Initially the public prosecutor who ordered the arrest and is himself married to an Abaza, instituted travel bans on figures associated with the regime and its final cabinet. An appeals court later freed minister Amin Abaza.

In 2014, the family sued Sada Elbalad TV for the creation of a children's cartoon named 'Abaza', and the program was forced off the air. In the same year Egyptian satellite channel CBC Two aired a one-hour documentary about the family.

They are also known for producing many CEOs and owners of businesses and corporations.

Their combined wealth is unknown.

== Notable members ==
The family features a substantial number of famous or influential members, and thus this section will keep to a few examples from the 20th and 21st centuries.

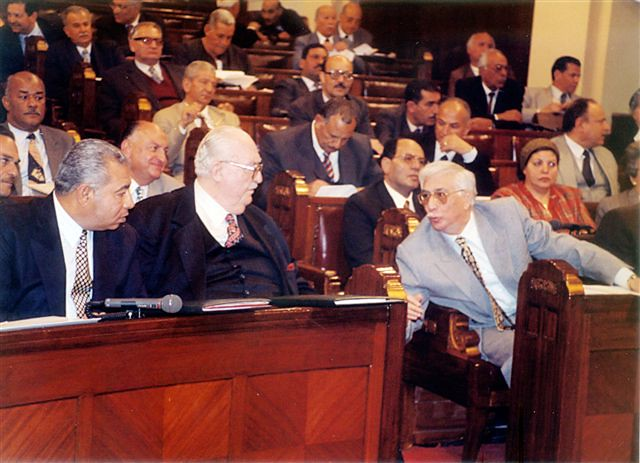
- Tharwat Abaza speaking to Maher Abaza in parliament
  The Abaza family includes several literary figures, such as Desouky Pasha Abaza, Ismail Pasha Abaza, Fekry Pasha Abaza (known as the 'Shiekh of Journalism') and Aziz Pasha Abaza. Additionally, Tharwat Abaza (1927–2002) was a journalist, novelist and member of parliament. His best-known novel, A Man Escaping from Time, was televised in the late 1960s.

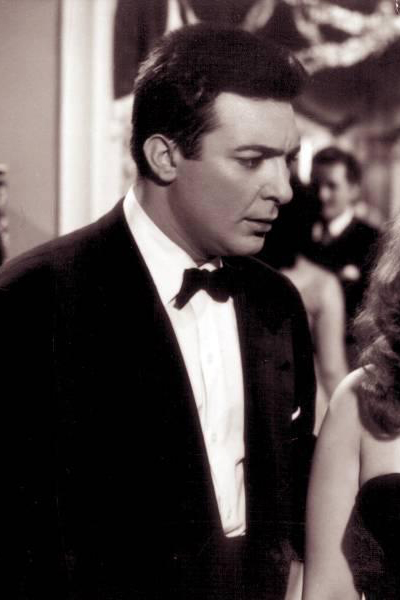
Rushdy Abaza, the clan's most famous member

- Rushdy Saiid Bughdadi Abaza (1926 -1980), an actor "widely considered one of the greatest names in the history of Arab cinema", with no less than 150 movies to his name. At that time, "[acting] was not allowed in such an aristocratic family...and his father and the entire Abaza family strongly objected ...[but] he insisted." He is the best known family member and a household name in the Arab world.
- Maher Abaza (1930–2007), the longest-serving minister in Egyptian history. As the Minister of Electricity and Energy, he was credited with connecting the vast majority of the country's rural areas to the electric grid. After leaving the ministry he became a member of the Egyptian Parliament.
- Wagih Abaza (1917–2004), a member of the Free Officers Movement, which toppled King Farouk in 1952. He later became governor of four provinces including the capital Cairo, Sharqia, Beheira, and Gharbia, and a prominent businessman. He was well known for marrying the famed actress Leila Mourad.
- Mona Abaza (1959–2021), one of Egypt's most prominent sociologists, whose research interests "ranged from women in rural Egypt, the relation between Islam and the West, urban consumer culture, to Egyptian painting and the Arab Spring".

== Gallery ==
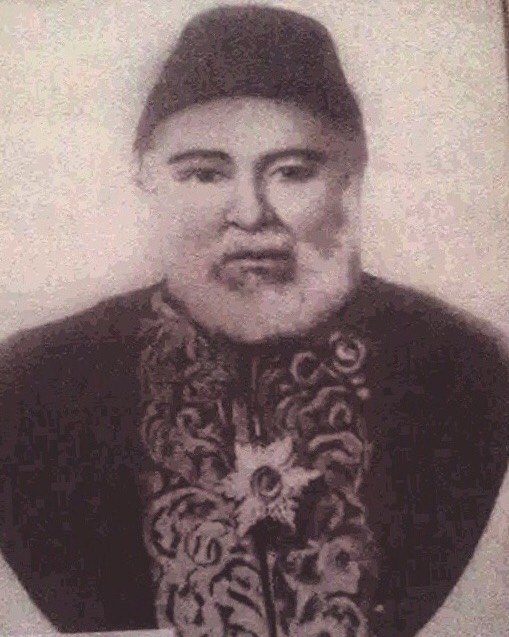
al-Sayed Pasha Abaza, one of the sons of Shiekh of the Arabs Hassan Abaza

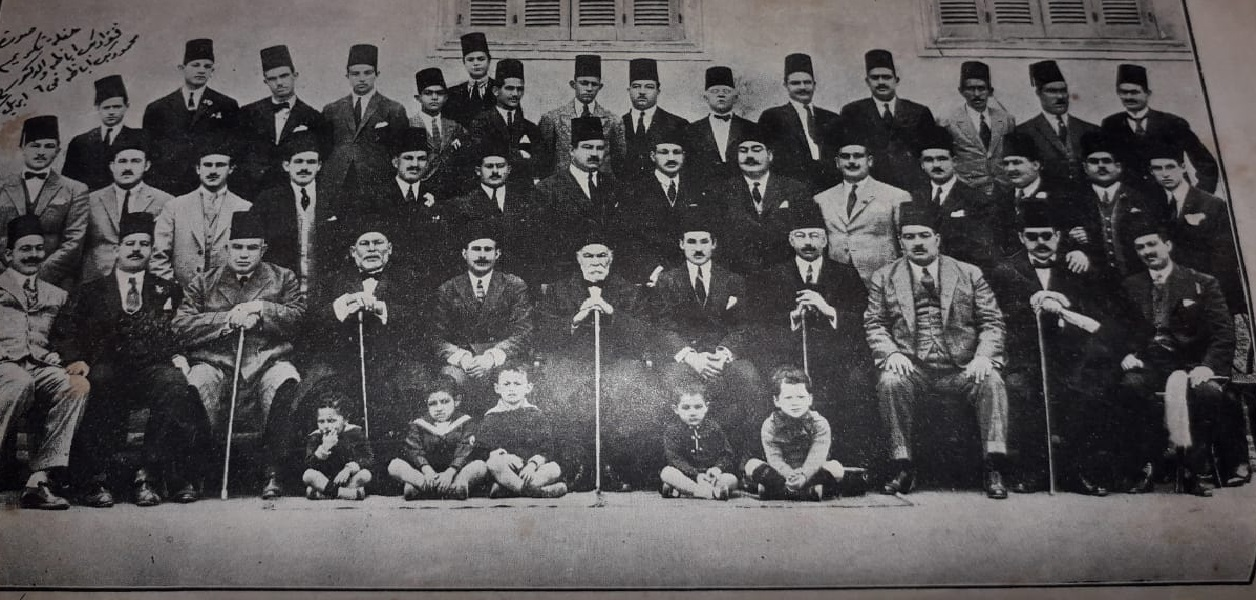
Abaza family elders in 1923 during an honoring ceremony

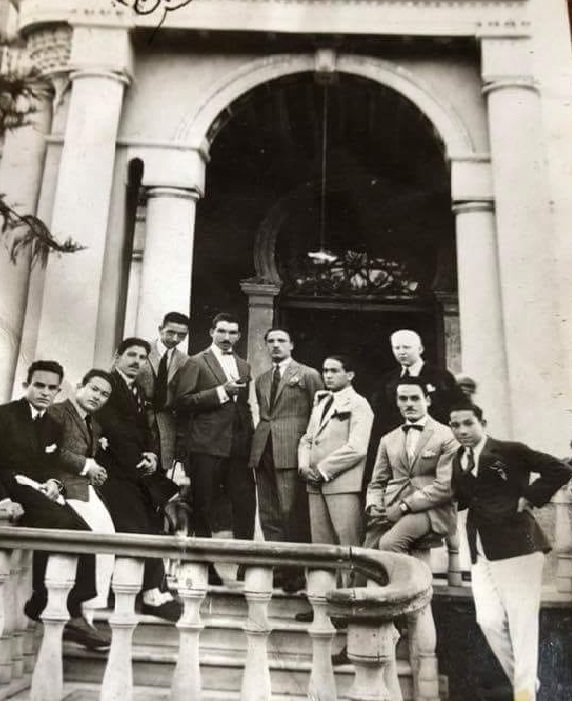
Abaza Beys at their palace in Sharqia

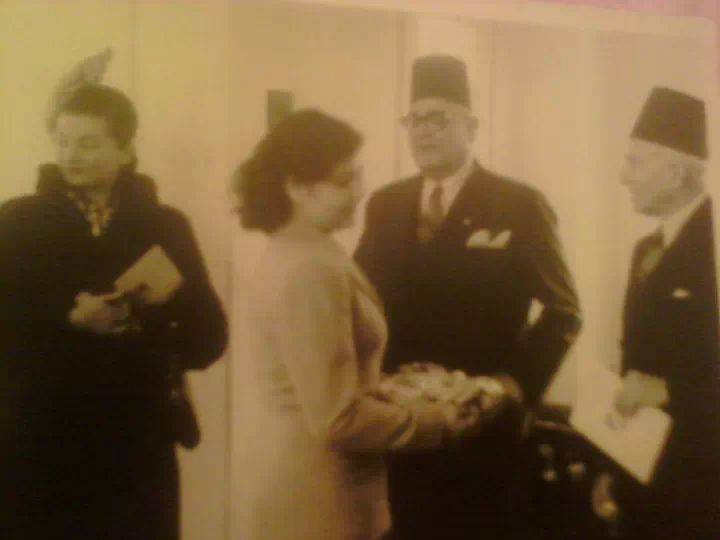
Princess Faika of Egypt with Fekry Pasha Abaza and Fouad Pasha Abaza

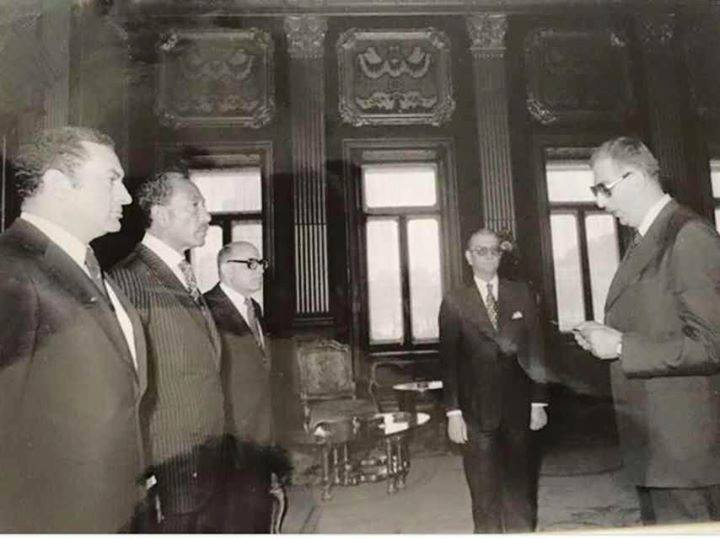
Maher Abaza taking oath with President Anwar Sadat and VP Hosni Mubarak at Abdeen Palace

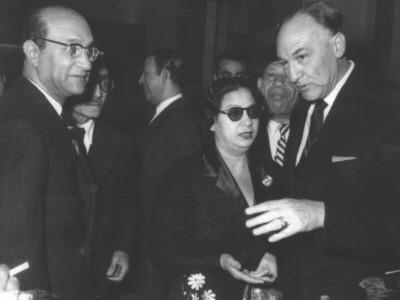
Aziz Pasha Abaza with famed singer Umm Kulthum and composer Mohammed Abdel Wahab

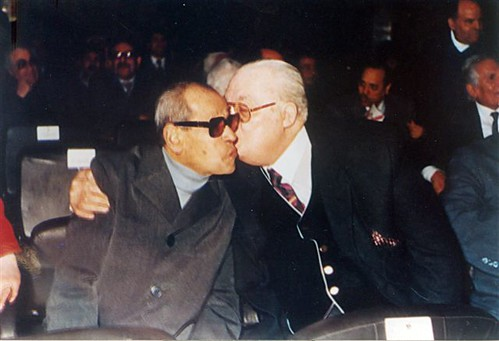
Tharwat Abaza and Nobel Laureate Naguib Mahfouz

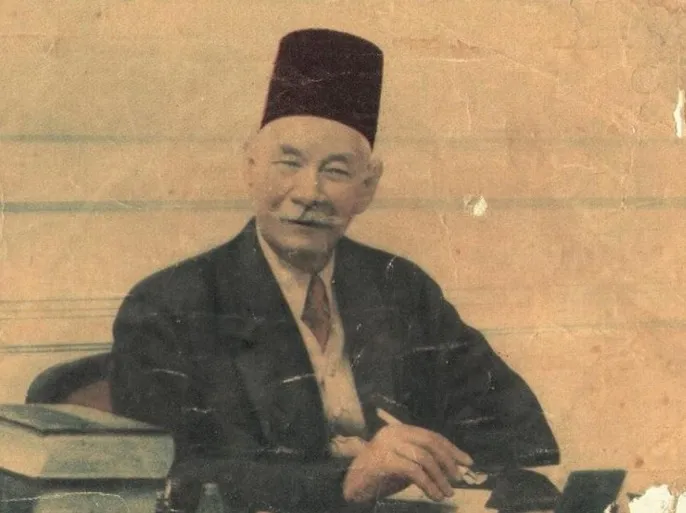
Ismail Pasha Abaza

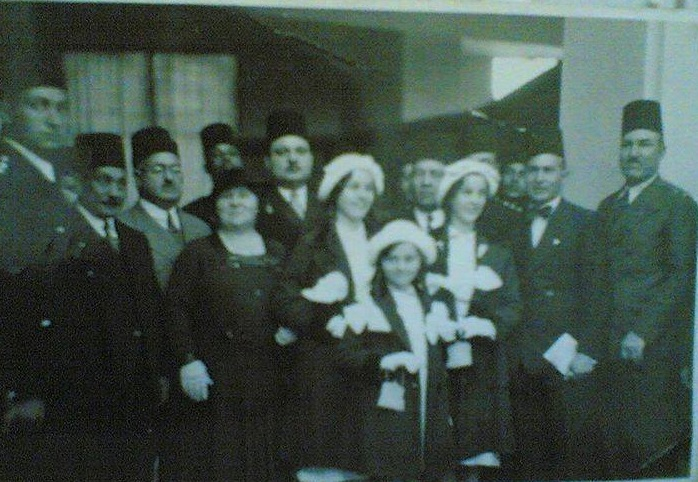
al-Sayed Bey Abaza (far right) with the royal sisters of Farouk of Egypt

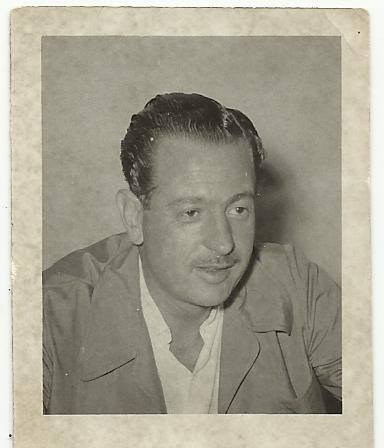
Bahgat Soliman Atia Boghdady Abaza one of the heirs to Ezbet Atia Abaza in Sharqia

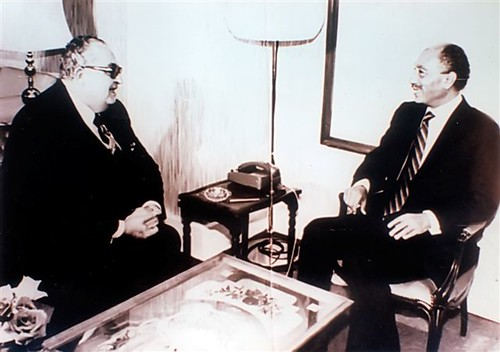
Tharwat Abaza and President Anwar Sadat

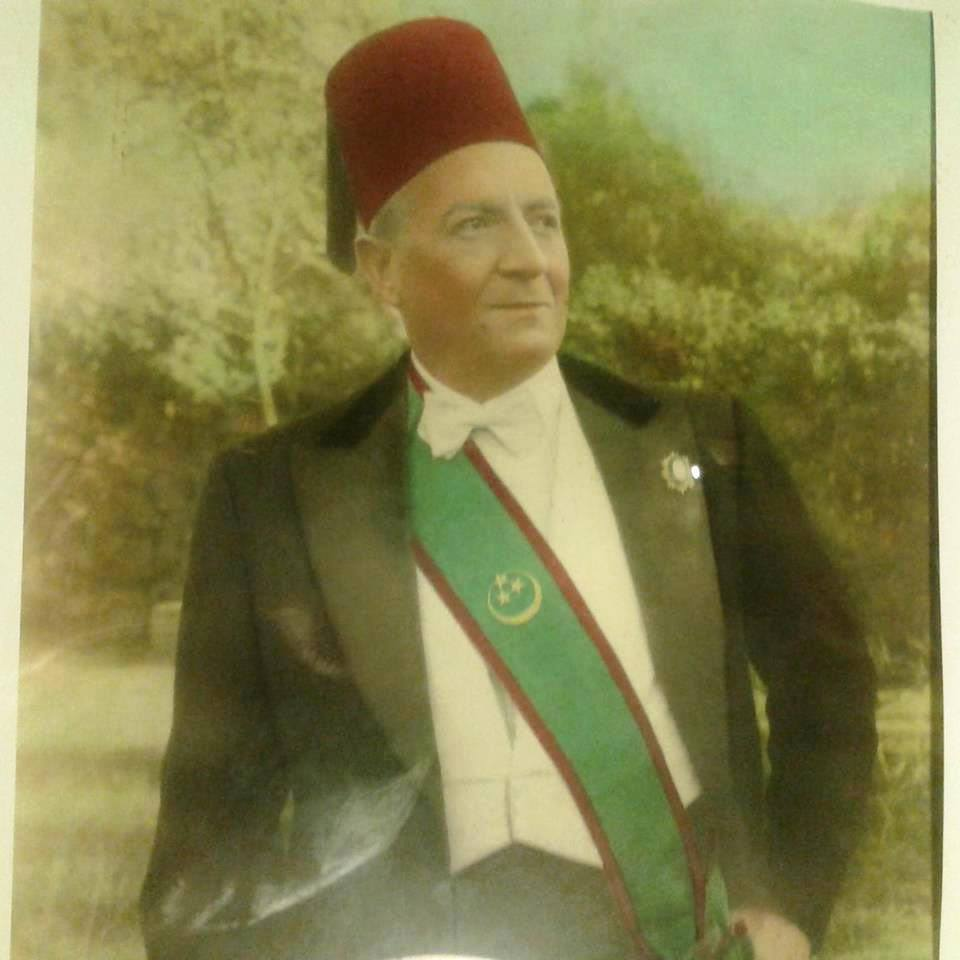
Raouf Bey Abaza

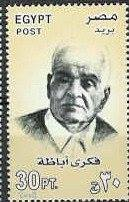
Stamp with Fekry Pasha Abaza

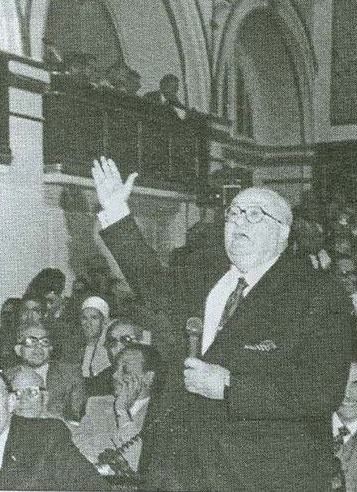
Tharwat Abaza speaking in the Shura Council (Egypt)

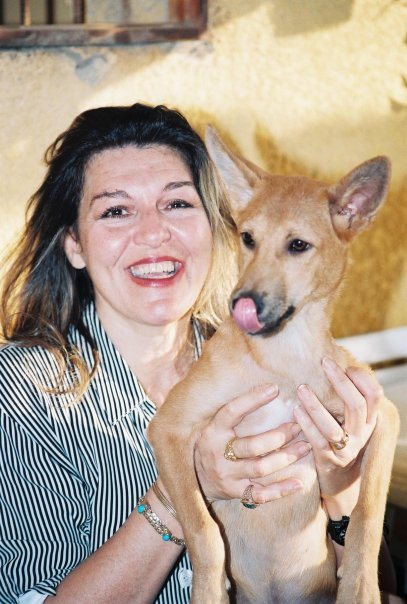
Amina Abaza, co-founder of the Society for Protection of Animal Rights in Egypt with Dina Zulfikar

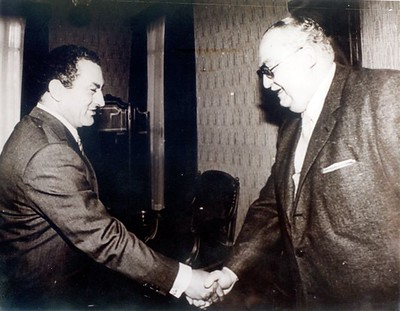
Tharwat Abaza and President Hosni Mubarak

== See also ==
- Abaza (disambiguation)
- Abaza (surname)
- Abazins
- Circassians in Egypt
- Egyptian literature
- Abaza language
- Sharqia Governorate
- Abazinia

== Notes ==
1. Under Ottoman rule Mamluks continued to act as governors of the country until Muhammad Ali's rise to power, meaning that the marriage could have taken place both under Ottoman rule and Mamluk governance.
2. The 1400-year span pertains to the al-Ayed line. The Abaza matriarch seems to have been present in Egypt more recently at approximately 300 years ago.
3. These scholarly views pertain to al-Ayed and not to the Abazin line.

== Bibliography ==
1. Springborg, R. (2016). Family, Power, and Politics in Egypt: Sayed Bey Marei—His Clan, Clients, and Cohorts. London: Routledge. pp. 45–47, 102–106.
2. Abaza, M. (2013). The Cotton Plantation Remembered: An Egyptian Family Story. Cairo: AUC Press. Preface, pp. 7–9; Chapters 1 & 3 (pp. 21–38, 85–97).
3. Wissa, K. (1989). Freemasonry in Egypt 1798–1921: A Study in Cultural and Political Encounters. British Journal of Middle Eastern Studies, 16(1), 43–57.p. 52.
4. Whidden, J. (2013). Monarchy and Modernity in Egypt. Florence: Leo S. Olschki. pp. 189–192.
5. Hartnett, A.S., & Saleh, M. (2021). Intra-Elite Conflict and the Demand for Power-Sharing: Evidence from Khedival Egypt. AALIMS Working Paper.pp. 14–17.
6. Kazziha, W. (1970). The Evolution of the Egyptian Political Elite, 1907–1921: A Case Study of the Role of the Large Landowners in Politics. PhD Dissertation, SOAS. pp. 133–135.
7. Mansour, N. (2025). A New Ruling Class and Its Empires: The Case of Nineteenth-Century Egypt. PhD Dissertation, Columbia University. pp. 201–204.
8. Wynn, L.L. (2003). From the Pyramids to Pyramids Road: An Ethnography of the Idea of Egypt. PhD Dissertation, ProQuest. p. 27.
9. Jacob, W.C. (2005). Working Out Egypt: Masculinity and Subject Formation between Colonial Modernity and Nationalism, 1870–1940. PhD Dissertation, ProQuest. pp. 77–78.
10. Reid, D.M. (1983). Turn-of-the-Century Egyptian School Days. Comparative Education Review, 27(2), 233–247.p. 239.
