= Minya al-Qamh =

Coordinates: 30°31′N 31°21′E

Minya al-Qamh (Arabic: منيا القمح, "abode of the wheat") is the capital of the eponymous markaz (county) in the Nile Delta governorate of Sharqia, Egypt. The markaz is home to 11 local units (towns and large villages), 82 villages, and 245 hamlets. In 2017, the Minya al-Qamh markaz was home to 769,333 people (the third largest), while city had 87,875 residents.

== Geography ==
Its climate is mild and it lies between Zagazig (capital of Sharqia) and Banha (capital of Qalyubiyya).

== Roads ==
It contains many roads, one of which links it with Zagazig which is 15 km in an easterly direction and one which links it with Benha and some 20 km in a westerly direction.

The town lies on a branch of the Nile River which is called Moise and it separates the town into two parts the north and south part and this branch is from the most important water ways in Egypt and in the world as it is a field of travelling boats between Cairo - Alexandria - Zagazig.

The closest airport to Minya El Qamh is Cairo Northern Airport which is 45 km away from Minya El Qamh and it is on the Cairo - Minya El Qamh main road.

== Economy ==
Agriculture is the most important economic activity in Minya El Qamh followed by retailing as it contains many Shopping malls - Shopping centres - Hyper markets then Industry as there are many factories and companies inside this town.

== Notable persons ==
- Abaza Family
- Aziz Abaza, poet
- Mohamed Abdel Razek, footballer
