= Circassians in Egypt =

Egyptians of partial or full ethnic Circassian origin

Circassians (Abkhaz-Adige) in Egypt
Мысырым ис Адыгэхэр الشركس في مصر
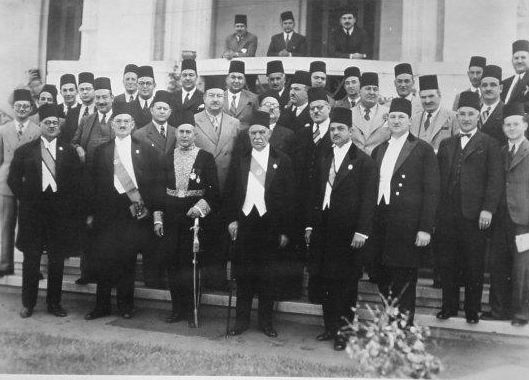
- Abaza Family Elders at their palace in Sharqia, one of the largest Circassian clans in Egypt.

Regions with significant populations
- Alexandria, Cairo, Giza, Port Said, Sharqia Governorate

Languages
- Egyptian Arabic (predominant); Circassian; French; Turkish

Religion
- Sunni Islam

The Circassians in Egypt (Adyghe: Мысырым ис Адыгэхэр, romanized: Mısırım yis Adıgəxər; Arabic: الشركس في مصر) are people of Egypt with Circassian origin. For centuries, Circassians have been part of the ruling elite in Egypt, having served in high military, political and social positions. The Circassian presence in Egypt traces back to 1297 when Lajin became Sultan of Mamluk Sultanate of Egypt. Under the Burji dynasty, Egypt was ruled by twenty one Circassian sultans from 1382 to 1517. Even after the abolishment of the Mamluk Sultanate, Circassians continued to form much of the administrative class in Egypt Eyalet of Ottoman Empire, Khedivate of Egypt, Sultanate of Egypt and Kingdom of Egypt. Following the Revolution of 1952, their political impact has been relatively decreased.

With the lack of censuses based on ethnicity, population estimates vary significantly.

Mainly of mixed Circassian Abazin origin, the House of Abaza is the largest aristocratic family and the largest extended family in the country. It retained cultural and political clout to current times.

== History ==
Circassians in Egypt have a long history. They arrived in Egypt during the Mamluk and Ottoman era, although a small number migrated as muhajirs in the late 19th century as well. The Circassians in Egypt were very influential from the 13th century. To a certain extent, they shared the same role as their fellow Circassians who lived in neighbouring Ottoman Turkey; many were importees, deportees, slaves, but also made up many of the notable noble families, while many others were kingmakers, royal consorts, military commanders, soldiers, craftsmen and artists.

The second dynasty of the Mamluk Sultanate was of Circassian origin.

== Religion ==
Circassians in Egypt are almost exclusively Sunni Muslim.

== Notables ==
Notable Egyptians of at least partial Circassian descent include:

- Al-Mansour Lajin – Mamluk Sultan of Egypt (1297–1299)
- Az-Zahir Barquq – Mamluk Sultan of Egypt (1382–1389) (1390–1399)
- Al-Nasir Faraj – Mamluk Sultan of Egypt (1399–1405) (1405–1412)
- Al-Mansur Abdul Aziz – Mamluk Sultan of Egypt (1405)
- Al-Mu'ayyad Sheikh – Mamluk Sultan of Egypt (1412–1421)
- Al-Muzaffar Ahmad – Mamluk Sultan of Egypt (1421)
- Az-Zahir Tatar – Mamluk Sultan of Egypt (1421)
- As-Saleh Muhammad – Mamluk Sultan of Egypt (1421)
- Al-Ashraf Barsbay – Mamluk Sultan of Egypt (1422–1438)
- Al-Aziz Yusef – Mamluk Sultan of Egypt (1438)
- Az-Zahir Jaqmaq – Mamluk Sultan of Egypt (1438–1453)
- Al-Mansur Osman – Mamluk Sultan of Egypt (1453)
- Al-Ashraf Inal – Mamluk Sultan of Egypt (1453–1461)
- Al-Mu'ayyad Ahmad – Mamluk Sultan of Egypt (1460)
- Az-Zahir Bilbay – Mamluk Sultan of Egypt (1467–1468)
- Al-Ashraf Qaitbay – Mamluk Sultan of Egypt (1468–1496)
- An-Nasir Muhammad – Mamluk Sultan of Egypt (1496–1498)
- Az-Zahir Qansuh – Mamluk Sultan of Egypt (1498–1500)
- Al-Ashraf Janbalat – Mamluk Sultan of Egypt (1500–1501)
- Al-Adil Tumanbay – Mamluk Sultan of Egypt (1501)
- Al-Ashraf Qansuh – Mamluk Sultan of Egypt (1501–1516)
- Al-Ashraf Tumanbay – Mamluk Sultan of Egypt (1516–1517)
- Ismail – Khedive of Egypt and the Sudan (1867–1879)
- Tewfik – Khedive of Egypt and the Sudan (1879–1892)
- Abbas II – Khedive of Egypt and the Sudan (1892–1914)
- Hussein Kamel – Sultan of Egypt (1914–1917)
- Fuad I – Sultan of Egypt (1917–1922) and King of Egypt (1922–1936)
- Farouk I – King of Egypt (1936–1952) and King of the Sudan (1951–1952)
- Farida – Queen consort of Egypt (1938–1948)
- Fawzia Fuad – Empress consort of Iran (1941–1948)
- Fuad II – King of Egypt (1953)
- The House of Abaza - the largest Circassian clan in Egypt.

== See also ==
- Demographics of Egypt
- Abaza in Egypt
- Circassians in Turkey
- Circassian diaspora
- Circassians in Iran
- Circassians in Jordan
