= Zouheir Chalak =

Political theorist and historian

Zouheir Chalak (Arabic: زهير الشلق; also transliterated as Zuhair al-Shalaq, El Cholak, Shalak; 1921–1994) was a political theorist, historian, writer, and advocate for democracy and free press in the Middle East. He supported the democratic parliamentary Syrian Republic, and scrutinized the socialism that emerged throughout the region. He documented how numerous key figures such as Jamil Mardam Bey and Shukri al-Quwatli helped lead Syria to independence, and was a proponent of constitutional governance that promoted democratic ideals. His work provided a first-hand account of politics during the French Mandate and early parliamentary eras, the various coups that occurred, and the descent into socialism. His extrajudicial abduction became a subject of international concern, and was publicized by human rights organizations Amnesty International and the International Commission of Jurists.

== Biography ==
Zouheir Chalak was born into a prominent family in Damascus, and eventually pursued a legal education and joined the primary coalition championing independence from the French Mandate (National Bloc). Indeed, during his first year as a law student circa 1941, Chalak acted as a secret courier at the direction of his father to transport letters between Prince Adel Arslan in Beirut and Shukri al-Quwatli in Damascus. Such clandestine communications facilitated negotiations in part with Axis operatives that aided efforts to pressure Vichy French authorities to reinstate a Syrian government.

In 1963, Chalak relocated to Lebanon following the collapse of Syria's parliamentary system and the rise of military-socialist regimes. In Lebanon, he continued as a legal and political columnist, contributing to regional newspapers including Al-Hayat. He articulated that the turn toward socialism in the Middle East curtailed civil liberties, destroyed burgeoning democracies, and led to dictatorships and security states.

Zouheir Chalak was detained and imprisoned for his views and articles, including several months in 1962–1963, and later for a decade from 1970 to 1980. He settled in France after his release and exile, where he continued writing as a columnist for Asharq Al-Awsat, until his death in 1994. He is buried next to his wife in the Neuilly-sur-Seine cemetery.

== Political views ==
Chalak supported the civilian-led parliamentary governance that was interrupted by coups and dictatorships. He argued that the constitutional system helped foster a sovereign Syrian republic, and documented how its suspension led to authoritarian rule. In his work In the Dock (Fi Qafas al-Ittiham), Chalak critiqued the various strands of socialist ideology that swept the region, and argued they were foreign imports that replaced the rule of law. They fostered the subsequent nationalization of private property, the abolition of political parties, eroded rights, and ran counter to certain Arab social norms. He opposed the union between Egypt and Syria (i.e., United Arab Republic), which dissolved in 1961.

== Selected works ==
- Fi Qafas al-Ittiham: Al-Shuyu’iyyah, Al-Nasiriyyah, Al-Ba’th (In the Dock: Communism, Nasserism, Ba’ath). Beirut: Dar al-Jumhuriya, 1966.
- Min Awraq al-Intidab: Tarikh Ma Aghfalahu al-Tarikh (From the Papers of the Mandate: History That History Overlooked). Beirut: Dar al-Nafais, 1989.
