= Abaza goat =

Breed of goat

Abaza
- Conservation status: At risk
- Other names: Abkhasian, Abkhazskaya
- Country of origin: Turkey
- Distribution: NE Turkey
- Use: Milk, Meat

Traits
- Horn status: Males horned, females usually hornless
- Beard: Males bearded
- Tassels: Without tassels
- Goat; Capra aegagrus hircus

The Abaza is an indigenous breed of goat from north-east Turkey. They are used for dairying, but also have relatively good meat production. Due to its small population size, there is a high degree of inbreeding within this breed, placing it "at risk".

Their hair is short, soft and pinkish-white in colour, with coloured markings around the mouth, eyes and on the legs. The males have long, flat, scimitar-shaped horns, while the females are usually polled.

As dairy goats, this breed has well-developed udders, and an average lactation yield of around 200 kg (440 lb). The milk produced from Abaza goats is used to create Abaza cheese, a nationally and internationally renowned semi-hard, lightly salted cheese.
