= Prikubansky District =

District/city division name

Prikubansky District is the name of several districts in Russia.

== Districts of the federal subjects ==
Location of the Karachay-Cherkess Republic in Russia

- Prikubansky District, Karachay-Cherkess Republic, an administrative and municipal district of the Karachay-Cherkess Republic

== City divisions ==
- Prikubansky Okrug, an okrug of the city of Krasnodar, the administrative center of Krasnodar Krai
Location of Krasnodar in Russia

== See also ==
- Prikubansky (disambiguation)
