= Amrit, Egypt =

Village in Sharqia Governorate, Egypt

Amrit عمريط
- Village
- Location of Amrit in Egypt
- Coordinates: 30°30′47″N 31°36′33″E
- Country: Egypt
- Governorate: Sharqia
- Center: Abu Hammad
- Time zone: UTC+2 (EET)
  - Summer (DST): UTC+3 (EEST)

Amrit (Arabic: عمريط) is a village in Abu Hammad, Sharqia Governorate in Egypt.
