= Abbas Pasha =

Abbas Pasha may refer to:

- Abbas I of Egypt (1812–1854), ruler of Egypt (r. November 1848 – July 1854)
- Abbas II of Egypt (1874–1944), khedive of Egypt (r. January 8, 1892 – 1914)
