= Pasha =

Title for high-ranking military or political officials in the Ottoman Empire

Pasha (Ottoman Turkish: پاشا; Turkish: paşa; Arabic: باشا, romanized: basha) (Note: In older works sometimes anglicized as bashaw.) was a high-rank, aristocratic title in the Ottoman political and military system, typically granted by the Sultan to governors, generals, dignitaries, and others carrying the tughra (imperial seal). Pasha, in one of its various ranks, is equivalent to the British title of Lord. Pasha was one of the highest titles in the 20th-century Kingdom of Egypt and it was also used in Morocco in the 20th century, where it denoted a regional official or governor of a district.

== Etymology ==
The English word pasha comes from Turkish pasha (pāşā; also basha (bāşā)). The Oxford English Dictionary attributes the origin of the English borrowing to the mid-17th century. The etymology of the Turkish word itself has been a matter of debate. Contrary to titles like emir (amīr) and bey (sir), which were established in usage much earlier, the title pasha came into Ottoman usage right after the reign of Osman I (d. 1324), though it had been used before the Ottomans by some Anatolian Turkish rulers of the same era. Old Turkish had no fixed distinction between /b/ and /p/, and the word was spelled başa still in the 15th century.

According to Online Etymology Dictionary, the Turkish pasha or basha was itself from Turkish baş / bash (باش 'head, chief'), itself from Old Persian pati- ('master', from Proto-Indo-European *poti) and the root of the Persian word shah, شاه. According to Oxford Dictionaries, the Turkish word from which it was borrowed was formed as a result of the combination of the Pahlavi words pati- 'lord', and shah (𐭬𐭫𐭪𐭠). According to Josef W. Meri and Jere L. Bacharach, the word is "more than likely derived from the Persian Padishah" (پادشاه). The same view is held by Nicholas Ostler, who mentions that the word was formed as a shortening of the Persian word padishah. Jean Deny also attributed its origin to padishah, while repeating a suggestion by Gerhard Doerfer that it was influenced by Turkic baskak (bāsqāq), meaning 'agent, tax collector'.

Some theories have posited a Turkish or Turkic origin of the word, claiming it derived from başağa (bāş āghā), which denoted a 'principal elder brother' or 'prince's elder son' in the pre-Ottoman period. According to etymologist Sevan Nişanyan, the word is derived from Turkish beşe (بچّه 'boy, prince'), which is cognate with Persian bačče (بچّه). Some earlier Turkish lexicographers, such as Ahmed Vefik Paşa and Mehmed Salahi, argued it was most likely derived from Turkish başa or Turkish beşe, the latter meaning 'elder brother' and being a title given to some Ottoman provincial officials and janissaries.

As first used in western Europe, the title appeared in writing with an initial b. The English forms bashaw, bassaw, bucha, etc., general in the 16th and 17th century, derive through the medieval Latin and Italian word bassa. Due to the Ottoman presence in the Arab world, the title became used frequently in Arabic, though pronounced basha due to the absence of the /p/ sound in Arabic.

== Role in Ottoman and Egyptian political system ==
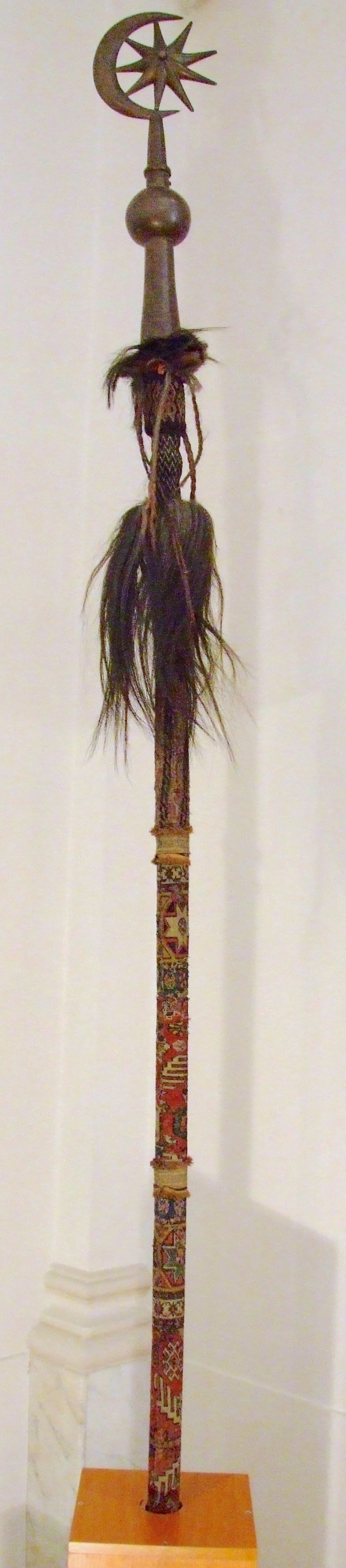
A pasha's tugh with two horse tails

Within the Ottoman Empire, the Sultan had the right to bestow the title of Pasha. Lucy Mary Jane Garnett wrote in the 1904 work Turkish Life in Town and Country that it was the sole "Turkish title which carries with it any definite rank and precedence".

It was through this custom that the title (Egyptian Arabic pronunciation: [ˈbæːʃæ]) came to be used in Egypt, which was conquered by the Ottomans in 1517. The rise to power in Egypt in 1805 by Muhammad Ali, an Albanian military commander, effectively established Egypt as a de facto independent state; however, it still owed technical fealty to the Ottoman Sultan. Moreover, Muhammad Ali harboured ambitions of supplanting the Osman Dynasty in Constantinople (now Istanbul), and sought to style his Egyptian realm as a successor sultanate to the Ottoman Empire. As such, he bore the title of Pasha, in addition to the official title of Wāli, and the self-declared title of Khedive. His successors to the Egyptian and Sudanese throne, Ibrahim, Abbas, Sa'id, and Isma'il also inherited these titles, with Pasha, and Wāli ceasing to be used in 1867, when the Ottoman Sultan, Abdülaziz officially recognised Isma'il as Khedive.

The title Pasha appears originally to have applied exclusively to military commanders and only high ranking family of the sultans, but subsequently it could distinguish any high official, and also unofficial persons whom the court desired to honour.

It was also part of the official style of the Kapudan Pasha (Grand Admiral of the Ottoman fleet). Pashas ranked above Beys and Aghas, but below Khedives and Viziers.

Three grades of Pasha existed, distinguished by the number of horse tails (three, two, and one respectively; a symbol of Turco-Mongol tradition) or peacock tails that the bearers were entitled to display on their standard as a symbol of military authority when on campaign. Only the sultan himself was entitled to four tails, as sovereign commander in chief.

The following military ranks entitled the holder to the style Pasha (lower ranks were styled Bey or merely Effendi):

- The Vizier-i-Azam (Grand Vizier, the prime minister, but also often taking the field as Generalissimo instead of the Sultan)
- Mushir (Field marshal)
- Ferik (army lieutenant-general or navy vice-admiral)
- Liva (major general or rear-admiral)
- The Kizlar Agha (chief black eunuch, the highest officer in the Topkapı Palace; three tails, as commander of the baltadji corps of the halberdiers in the imperial army
- Constantinople's Shaikh ul-Islam, the highest Muslim clergyman, of cabinet rank.

If a Pasha governed a provincial territory, it could be called a pashaluk after his military title, besides the administrative term for the type of jurisdiction, e.g. eyalet, vilayet/walayah. Both beylerbeys (governors-general) and valis/wālis (the most common type of Governor) were entitled to the style of Pasha (typically with two tails). The word pashalik designated any province or other jurisdiction of a Pasha, such as the Pasha or Bashaw of Tripoli.

Ottoman and Egyptian authorities conferred the title upon both Muslims and Christians without distinction. They also frequently gave it to foreigners in the service of the Ottoman Empire, or of the Egyptian Khedivate (later Sultanate, and Kingdom in turn), e.g. Hobart Pasha. In an Egyptian context, the Abaza Family is known as "the family of the pashas" for having produced the largest number of nobles holding this title under the Muhammad Ali dynasty and was noted in Egyptian media in 2014 as one of the main "families that rule Egypt" to this day, and as "deeply rooted in Egyptian society and... in the history of the country."

== Honorific ==
As an honorific, the title pasha was an aristocratic title and could be hereditary or non-hereditary, stipulated in the firman (patent of nobility) issued by the Sultan carrying the tughra (imperial seal). The title did not bestow rank or title to the wife nor was any religious leader elevated to the title. In contrast to western nobility titles, where the title normally is added before the given name, Ottoman titles followed the given name. In contacts with foreign emissaries and representatives, holders of the title Pasha were often referred to as "Your Excellency".

The sons of a Pasha were styled Pashazada or Pashazade.

In modern Egyptian and (to a lesser extent) Levantine Arabic, it is used as an honorific closer to "Sir" than "Lord", especially by older people. Among Egyptians born since the Revolution of 1952 and the abolition of aristocratic titles, it is considered a highly formal way of addressing one's male peers.

After the Turkish War of Independence, the Grand National Assembly of Turkey abolished the title Paşa, along with Bey and Efendi. Although Paşa is no longer an official title, generals of the Turkish Armed Forces are often unofficially referred to as Paşa along with General by the Turkish public and media.

In the French Navy, "pasha" (pacha in French) is the nickname of the commanding officer, similar to the term "skipper" in the Anglophone navies.

== List of notable pashas ==
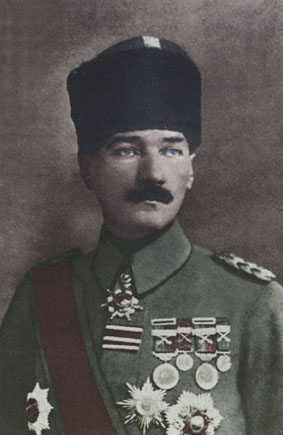
Mustafa Kemal Pasha

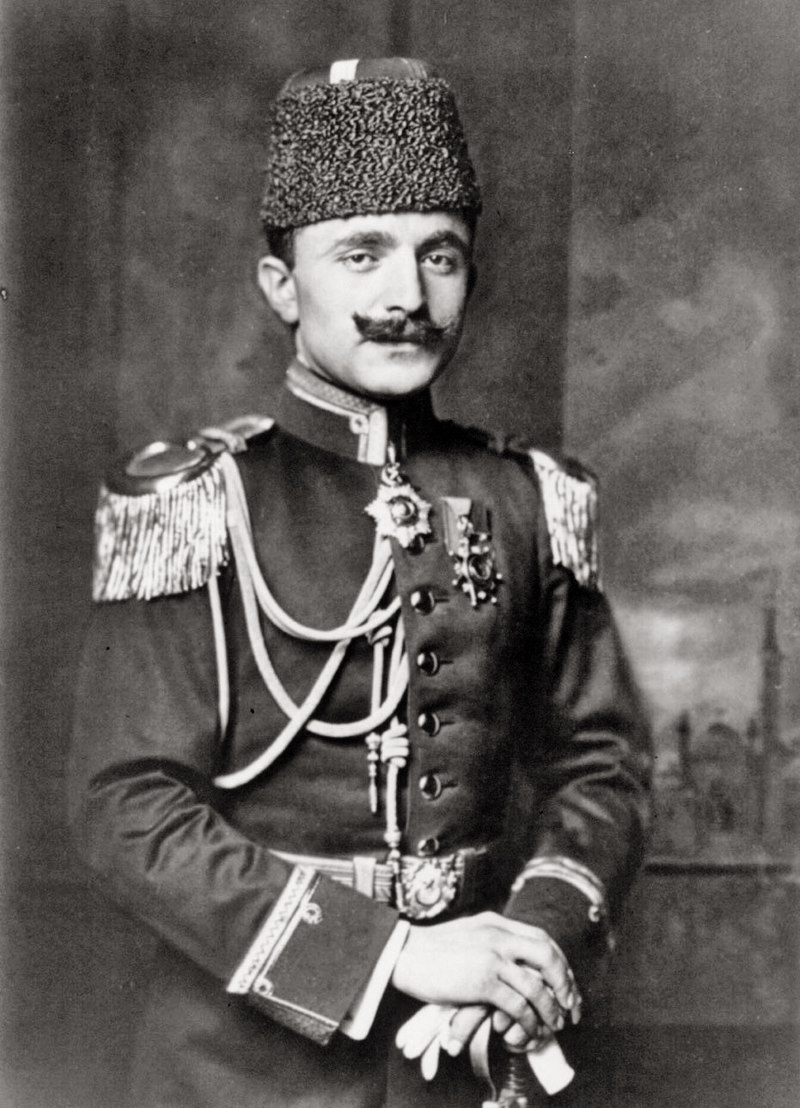
Enver Pasha

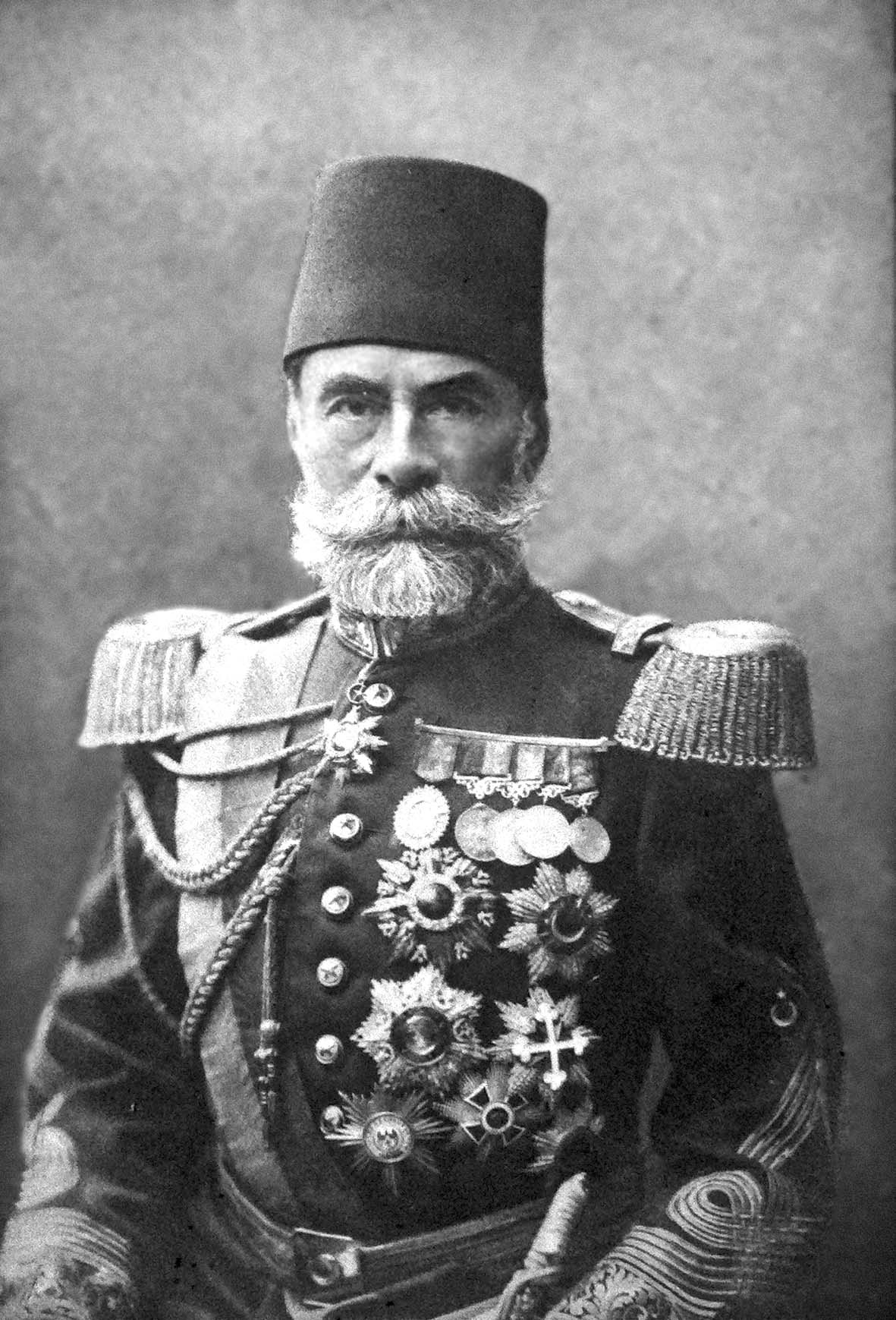
Ahmed Muhtar Pasha

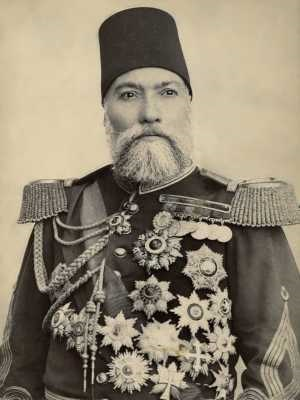
Osman Nuri Pasha

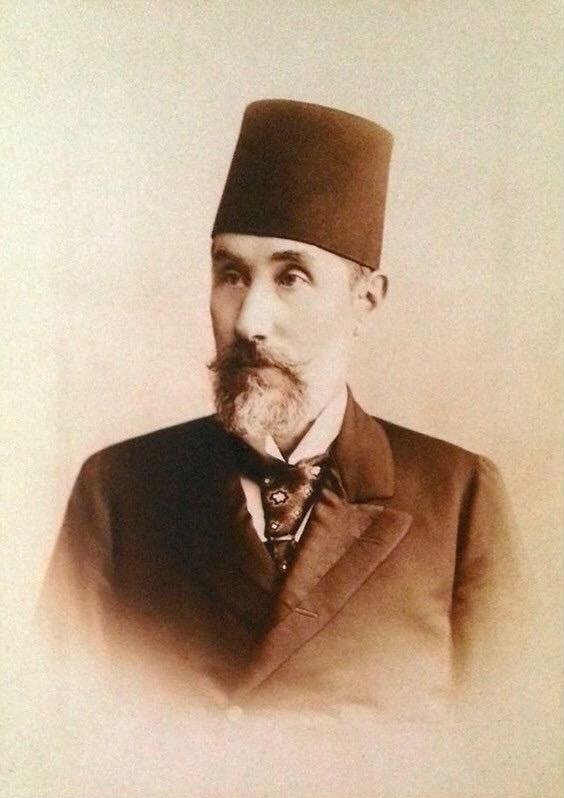
Mehmed Hulusi Pasha

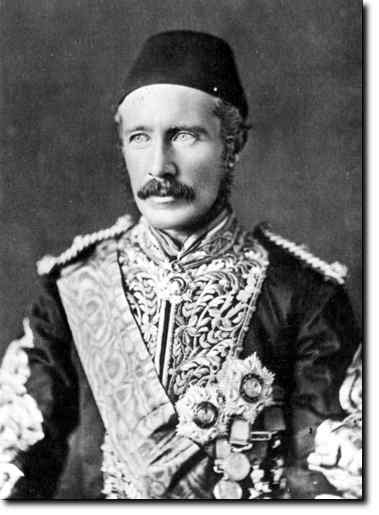
Major-General Charles George Gordon CB Pasha

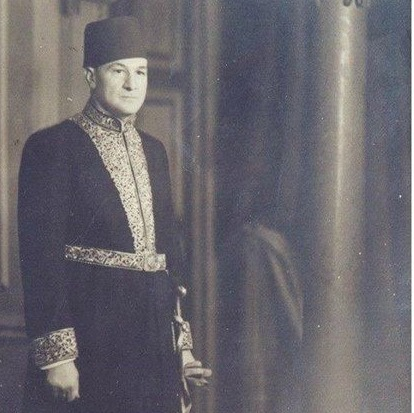
Aziz Pasha Abaza

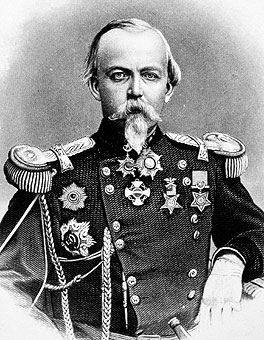
Stone Pasha Ben Schauma Pasha

The inclusion criterion is that the person held the rank of "pasha" in his society

- Abaza Family, Egyptian Pashas and Beys
- Abbas I of Egypt
- Abbas II of Egypt
- Abdel Rahim Sabri Pasha
- Ali Pasha, multiple people
- Ali Pasha Mubarak
- Andranik Pasha
- Anton Pasha
- Baker Pasha (Valentine Baker)
- Barbarossa Khair ad-Din Pasha
- Bucknam Pasha (Ransford Dodsworth Bucknam)
- Ahmed Pasha (Claude Alexandre de Bonneval)
- Cigalazade Yusuf Sinan Pasha
- Djemal Pasha
- Pargalı Ibrahim Pasha ("Ibrahim Pasha of Parga"), also known as Frenk Ibrahim Pasha ("the Westerner"), Makbul Ibrahim Pasha ("the Favorite") and Maktul Ibrahim Pasha ("the Executed")
- Dragut, Ottoman Naval Commander & Pasha of Tripoli
- El-Emam family
- Emin Pasha
- Enver Pasha
- Essad Pasha Toptani
- Fakhri Pasha
- Fekry Pasha Abaza
- Fuad Pasha
- Gessi Pasha (Romolo Gessi)
- Glubb Pasha (Sir John Bagot Glubb)
- Gordon Pasha (Charles George Gordon)
- Guyon Pasha, (General Richard Guyon), also known as Kurshid Pasha.
- Habib Abdoe'r Rahman Alzahier
- Hagop Kazazian Pasha
- Hajji Mustafa Pasha
- Hobart Pasha (Augustus Charles Hobart-Hampden)
- Hüseyin Tevfik Pasha, arms and algebra expert.
- Hussein Refki Pasha
- Ibrahim Edhem Pasha
- İsmet Pasha (İsmet İnönü)
- Ja'far Pasha al-Askari, founder of the modern Iraqi army.
- Jamal Pasha
- Judar Pasha, Moroccan general.
- Kara Mustafa Pasha
- Hicks Pasha (William Hicks), British Colonel, Hero of the Mahdist Wars.
- Kazazian Pasha
- Kilic Ali Pasha
- Multiple members of the Köprülü family
- Lala Kara Mustafa Pasha
- Liman von Sanders Pasha (Otto Liman von Sanders)
- Goltz Pasha (Colmar Freiherr von der Goltz)
- Mahmud Dramali Pasha, Ottoman general
- Marcus Simaika Pasha, Egyptian Coptic leader, politician
- Mehmet Esat Bülkat
- Mehmed Pasha Sokolović
- Meissner Pasha (Heinrich August Meissner)
- Melling Pasha (Antoine Ignace Melling)
- Midhat Pasha
- Müezzinzade Ali Pasha, Ottoman admiral.
- Muhammad Ali Pasha, viceroy of Egypt
- Mustafa Kemal Pasha, subsequently known as Mustafa Kemal Atatürk, founder of the post-Ottoman Turkish republic.
- Mustafa Reshid Pasha
- Naguib Pasha Mahfouz, is known as the father of obstetrics and gynaecology in Egypt and was a pioneer in obstetric fistula.
- Nubar Pasha
- Nuri Pasha al-Said, Iraqi political premier of the Kingdom of Iraq.
- Osman Pasha
- Omar Pasha Latas
- Piyale Pasha
- Qassim Pasha Al Zuhair, Pasha of basra and Kuwait.
- Radu Bey, Pasha of Wallachia, Brother of Vlad III Tepes
- Refet Bele
- Regep Aga
- Riyad Pasha, Egyptian statesman.
- Russell Pasha, British officer in the Egyptian police.
- Rüstem Pasha the longest serving Grand Vizier of the Ottoman Empire.
- Said Pasha
- Şerif Pasha, Kurdish nationalist.
- Sentot Prawirodirdjo, known as "Alibasah Sentot" or "Sentot Ali Pasha". Javanese Muslim commander during Java War.
- Sinan Pasha
- Slatin Pasha (Rudolf Carl von Slatin)
- Stone Pasha (Charles Pomeroy Stone)
- Sulejman Pasha
- Sultan al-Atrash
- Tahir Pasha, vali of Mosul 1910-12.
- Talat Pasha
- Tawfiq Bay (Tevfik Pasha), Arab pan-Islamist.
- Turhan Pasha Përmeti
- Tusun Pasha
- Urabi Pasha
- Vartan Pasha
- Wehib Pasha
- Williams Pasha (Sir William Williams), Canadian/British General.
- Woods Pasha (Henry Felix Woods)
- Yeghen family, Egyptian Pashas and Beys that are related to the Egyptian Royal Family.
- Youssef Zulficar Pasha
- Youssef Wahba Pasha, Egyptian Prime Minister.
- Yusuf Murad Pasha (Józef Bem), Polish general and a national hero of Poland and Hungary, who served in the Ottoman Empire.
- Yusuf Karamanli, Pasha of Tripoli
- Zulfikar family, Egyptian Pashas and Beys.

== See also ==
- List of Ottoman titles and appellations
