= Abaz =

Abaz is a given name and a surname. Notable people with the name include:

== Given name ==
- Abaz Çelkupa (1850–1926), Albanian politician
- Abaz Gjuka (born 1959), leader of the Democratic Union for Integration
- Abaz Hilmi, (1887–1947), 5th Dedebaba of the Bektashi Order
- Abaz Karakaçi (born 1992), Albanian professional footballer
- Abaz Kupi (1892–1976), Albanian military officer

== Surname ==
- Emil Abaz (born 1998), Macedonian professional footballer

== See also ==
- Abaza (disambiguation)
