= Abazinia =

Historical country in the Greater Caucasus

Abazinia, Abazashta, or Abaza is a historical country at the northern mountainside of the Greater Caucasus, now the northern part of Karachay–Cherkess Republic, Russia. Abazinia is the home of the Abazins, a people that speak the Abazin language. They are closely related to the Abkhazians.

In the 16th-18th centuries, Abazinia was a part of Kabarda and was often raided by the Crimeans. The area became a part of the Russian Empire in the 19th century. During the rule of Kabardians, Crimeans, and Russians, some Abazins were forcibly resettled from their homeland.

== Modern times ==
Map of the pre-genocide distribution of Abazins in the North Caucasus and modern Abaza district

The Soviet power was proclaimed there in 1918. On 1 April 1918, Abazinia was made a part of the Kuban Soviet Republic, which would merge into the Kuban-Black Sea Soviet Republic on 28 May of that year. From 5 July to December 1918, it was in the North Caucasian Soviet Republic. On 20 January 1921, it was made a part of the Mountain ASSR. Then on 12 January 1922, it was made a part of the Karachay–Cherkess Autonomous Oblast, South-Eastern Krai. On 26 April of that same year, it was made a part of the Cherkess Autonomous Oblast, Stavropol Krai. Beginning on 9 January 1957, it was a part of the recreated Karachay–Cherkess Autonomous Oblast, Stavropol Krai.

At the congress of the Abazin deputies in November 1991, the Abazin Republic was proclaimed with the capital in the aul of Psyzh. The republic was never recognized by the authorities of the RSFSR, and Abazinia remained a part of Karachay–Cherkessia, which gained republic status on November 30, 1990.

In January 1995, the congress of the Abazin people claimed an autonomous Abazin region within Stavropol Krai. At 27 June 2005, a Special Congress of the Abazin People bound the head of 13 Abazin auls, situated in 5 different districts of Karachay-Cherkessia to leave these districts to form Abazinsky District. On 25 December 2005, 99% of the population of Abazinia voted in a referendum for the establishment of this district. On 1 July 2006, the premier-minister of the Russian Federation decreed the district with its center in Inzhich-Chukun. The municipalities of Psyzh, Elburgan, Inzhich-Chukun, Kubina, and Kara-Pago were passed from the Prikubansky District, Ust-Dzhegutinsky District, and Khabezsky District. The district was formed on January 1, 2009.

According to the 2002 census, there were 37,942 Abazins in Russia. An Abazin diaspora exists in Turkey, Jordan, Syria, Egypt (which features the Abaza family, the largest aristocratic family in Egypt), and other Islamic countries, most of which are descendants of refugees (muhajirs) from the Caucasian War with the Russian Empire.

There is a significant Abazin presence in Turkey. An estimated 150,000 Abazins live in the provinces of Eskişehir, Samsun, Yozgat, Adana, and Uzunyayla (the long plateau). Most of them belong to the Ashkharua clan that fought against the Tsarist army and emigrated to Turkey after losing the battle of Kbaada (Krasnaya Polyana in today's Sochi), whereas the Tapanta clan fought with the Russian forces.
