= Aziz Abaza =

Egyptian poet (1898–1973)

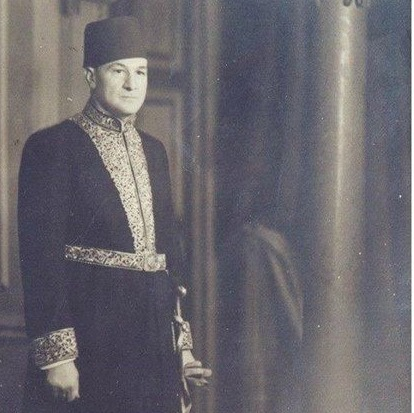
- Aziz Abaza
- Born: 13 August 1898; Minya El Qamh, Sharqiya Governorate, Egypt
- Died: 11 July 1973 (aged 74)
- Occupations: Poet, Politician

Aziz Pasha Abaza (Arabic: عزيز أباظة; born 13 August 1898 – 11 July 1973) was an Egyptian poet, known in the fields of modern Egyptian literature and Arab literature.

Abaza's poems are preoccupied with Arab unity and Pan-Arabism. His poetry was an inspiration for Arabism advocates. He was a prominent member of the Abaza Family, an Egyptian aristocratic clan of Abazin, Circassian origin.

== Early life ==
Abaza was born in Minya El Qamh, Al Sharqiya governorate in Egypt. He joined the School of Law from where he graduated in 1923.

He worked as a member of Parliament, director of the Identification Department, Egyptian Ministry of Interior in 1923, and Deputy-Governor of Beheira Governorate in 1935.

Moreover, he worked as governor of Al Qalyoubiya and Faiyum and Suez Canal Zone.

== See also ==
- Abaza family
- Fekry Pasha Abaza
- Tharwat Abaza
- Egyptian literature
- Arabic literature
