= Abazins =

Ethnic group in the Northwest Caucasus

Abaza Абаза
- Flag of the Abazins

Total population
- 210,000 (est.)

Regions with significant populations
- Turkey: 15,000–150,000
- Russia: Karachay-Cherkessia; Stavropol Krai; Kabardino-Balkaria: 43,341; 36,919; 3,646; 418
- Egypt: 5,000–15,000
- Ukraine: 128

Languages
- Abaza, Russian, Arabic, Turkish

Religion
- Predominantly Sunni Islam

Related ethnic groups
- Abkhazians and Circassians

Abazin country

The Abazins (or Abazinians), also known as the Abaza, (Note: Abaza and Abkhaz: Абаза, romanized: Abaza; Adyghe: Абазэхэр [aːbaːzɜxɜ́r]; Russian: Абазины, romanized: Abazíny, IPA: [ɐbɐˈzʲinɨ]; Turkish: Abazalar, IPA: [abazaˈɫaɾ]; Arabic: أباظة, romanized: Abāẓa, IPA: [ʔaˈbaːðˤa]; Ukrainian: Абазини, romanized: Abazyny, IPA: [ɐbɐˈzɪnɪ]) are an ethnic group of the Northwest Caucasus, closely related to the Abkhaz and Circassian peoples. Today, as a result of atrocities committed by Imperial Russia during the Circassian genocide, they live mostly in Turkey, Syria, Jordan, Egypt and in Karachay-Cherkessia and Stavropol Krai in the North Caucasus region of Russia. The Tapanta (ru:Тапанта), a branch of the Abaza, lived between the Besleney and Kabardian princedoms on the upper Kuban.

Abaza people historically speak the Abaza language, a Northwest Caucasian language most closely related to Abkhaz, and more distantly related to the Ubykh and Circassian languages. There are two dialects of Abaza spoken in Karachay-Cherkessia: Ashkharua and Tapanta. The culture and traditions of the Abazin are similar to those of the Circassians. On many old maps Abazin territory is marked as part of Circassia (Adygea).

According to the 2010 Russian census, there were 43,341 Abazins in Russia.

== Diaspora ==
An Abazin diaspora exists in Turkey, Egypt and in Middle Eastern countries such as Jordan and Syria, most of which are descendants of muhajirs from the Caucasian War with the Russian Empire.

There is a significant Abazin presence in Turkey. An estimated 150,000 Abaza live in the provinces of Eskişehir, Samsun, Yozgat, Adana, Kayseri, and Sakarya, as well as İzmit and İstanbul.

Most of them belong to the Ashkharua clan that fought against the Tsarist army and emigrated to Turkey after losing the battle of Kbaada (Krasnaya Polyana in today's Sochi), whereas the Tapanta clan fought with the Russian forces.

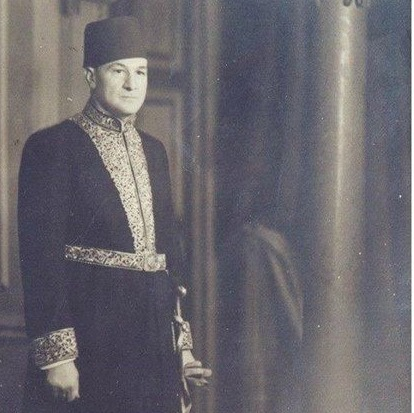
Aziz Pasha Abaza of the Egyptian Abaza family, the country's sole Abazin clan

A prominent example in Egypt is the Abaza family, a large Egyptian Abazin clan.

== Culture ==
Historically, the Abazin engaged in animal herding and some farming.

The Abazins are dominantly Sunni Muslims. The Abazins first encountered Islam during their migrations to the Abazinia region via contact with the Nogais and other Muslim people. The Abazins adopted Islam via the influence of Muslim merchants and missionaries from the 16th to 19th centuries.

== See also ==
- Abaza in Egypt
- Abazinia
- Abazinsky District
