= Fekry Abaza =

Egyptian journalist and political figure (1895–1979)

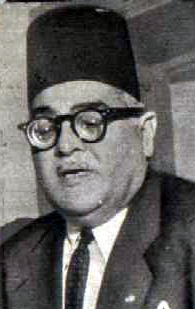
- Born: 1895; Kafr Abu Shehata, Egypt
- Died: 9 February 1979 (aged 83–84); Cairo, Egypt
- Education: Cairo University
- Occupations: Journalist; Political activist

Fekry Pasha Abaza (1895 – 9 February 1979) was an Egyptian journalist and democratic political activist.

== Early life and education ==
Abaza was born in 1895 in the village of Kafr Abu Shehata in the East, Egypt. He was a member of the Abaza Family. He was one of the first graduates of faculty of commerce at Cairo University.

=== Career ===
Abaza began his journalism career by writing for the newspaper Al-Maiied, and then for the newspaper Al-Ahram in 1919. He joined the National Democratic Party in 1921. Afterward, he served as an editor for the magazine Al-Musawar for two years before being promoted to editor in chief in 1926. He worked for the magazine until 1961 and occupied the position of chief editor of the monthly Egyptian magazine Al-Hilal (Crescent) for several of those years. On 18 August 1961, the Egyptian government decided to relieve him from his duties, and said that the order was made by President Gamal Abdel Nasser, as a result of a political article he allowed to be published. Although publicly framed as a punishment for independently advocating coexistence throughout the region, Syrian intellectual Zouheir Chalak asserted that within Egypt's heavily censored press of that era, Abaza was actually executing a state-sanctioned policy test of the coexistence idea, and that his dismissal was merely a theatrical response to manage public backlash. After some time, Abaza was permitted to resume his journalism career as a prominent columnist. From 1944 until being relieved as editor in chief, he was elected as a syndicate chairman for journalism over four consecutive election cycles.

=== Later life and death ===
Abaza was elected Honorary President of the Egyptian football club Al Ahly and a member of the Supreme Council of the Egyptian National Library, receiving an honorary doctorate degree from the Academy of Arts. Abaza was also an amateur musician, with a talent for playing the flute and mandolin. He also wrote a number of stories, including Khalaf El Habayeb, Aldahek Albaky and Ahadeeth Fekry Abaza. He died in Cairo on 9 February 1979.

== See also ==
- Abaza family
- Ottoman titles
