= Circassian diaspora =

Resettled Circassian community largely formed following the Russo-Circassian War

Circassians
Адыгэхэр (Adyghe) Адыгэхэр (Kabardian)
- Circassian flag

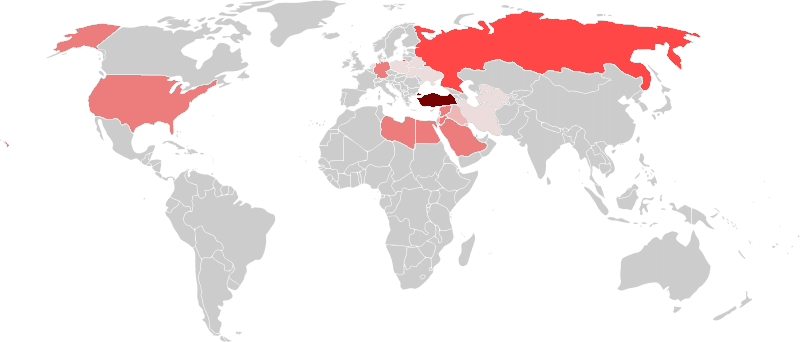
- Map of the Circassian diaspora

Total population
- c. 5.3 million

Regions with significant populations
- Turkey: 2,000,000–3,000,000
- Russia: 751,487
- Jordan: 100,000–170,000
- Syria: 80,000–120,000
- Egypt: 50,000
- Germany: 40,000
- Libya: 35,000
- Iraq: 34,000
- United States: 25,000
- Saudi Arabia: 23,000
- Iran: 5,000–50,000
- Israel: 4,000–5,000
- Uzbekistan: 1,257
- Ukraine: 1,001
- Poland: 1,000
- Netherlands: 500
- Canada: 400
- Belarus: 116

Languages
- Native: West Circassian, East Circassian; Diaspora: Turkish, Russian, Arabic, English, German, Persian, Hebrew

Religion
- Majority: Sunni Islam Minority: Christianity (mostly Eastern Orthodoxy, but also Catholicism), Circassian paganism, irreligion

Related ethnic groups
- Abazgi peoples (Abkhazians, Abazins)

The Circassian diaspora are ethnic Circassians around the world who were driven from Circassia during the late nineteenth and early twentieth century. From 1763 to 1864, the Circassians fought against the Russian Empire in the Russian-Circassian War which ended in a genocide campaign initiated between 1862 and 1864. Large numbers of Circassians were exiled and deported to the Ottoman Empire and nearby regions; others were resettled in Russia far from their homeland. Circassians live in more than fifty countries, besides the Republic of Adygea. Total population estimates differ: according to some sources, some two million Circassians live in Turkey, Jordan, Syria, and Iraq; other sources say between one and four million live in Turkey alone.

== Middle East ==
A large number of Circassians began arriving in the Levant in the 1860s and 1870s through resettlement by the Ottoman Empire for political or military reasons (in many cases). The Ottomans settled them in areas with Muslim minorities and populations that were otherwise of concern to the government; moreover, the dispersion of the Circassians, a warrior people, diminished their possible military threat. An estimated 600 Circassian villages are in Central and Western Anatolia. Likewise, Circassians who moved to Jordan were settled there to counter possible Bedouin attacks. There is a sizeable Circassian population in Syria, which has, to a great extent, preserved its original culture and even its language.

=== Turkey ===
Circassians are regarded by historians to play a key role in the history of Turkey. Turkey has the largest Adyghe population in the world, around half of all Circassians live in Turkey, mainly in the provinces of Samsun and Ordu (in Northern Turkey), Kahramanmaraş (in Southern Turkey), Kayseri (in Central Turkey), Bandırma, and Düzce (in Northwest Turkey), along the shores of the Black Sea; the region near the city of Ankara the region near the city of Ankara, and Yozgat. All citizens of Turkey are considered Turks by the government, but it is estimated that approximately two million ethnic Circassians live in Turkey. The "Circassians" in question do not always speak the languages of their ancestors, and in some cases some of them may describe themselves as "only Turkish". The reason for this loss of identity is mostly due to Turkey's Government assimilation policies and marriages with non-Circassians. Circassians are regarded by historians to play a key role in the history of Turkey. Some of the exiles and their descendants gained high positions in the Ottoman Empire. Most of the Young Turks were of Circassian origin. Until the end of the First World War, many Circassians actively served in the army. In the period after the First World War, Circassians came to the fore in Anatolia as a group of advanced armament and organizational abilities as a result of the struggle they fought with the Russian troops until they came to the Ottoman lands. However, the situation of the Ottoman Empire after the war caused them to be caught between the different balances of power between Istanbul and Ankara and even become a striking force. For this period, it is not possible to say that Circassians all acted together as in many other groups in Anatolia. The Turkish government removed 14 Circassian villages from Gönen and Manyas regions in December 1922, May and June 1923, without separating women and children, and drove them to different places in Anatolia from Konya to Sivas and Bitlis. This incident had a great impact on the assimilation of Circassians. After 1923, Circassians were restricted by policies such as the prohibition of Circassian language, changing village names, and surname law Circassians, who had many problems in maintaining their identity comfortably, were seen as a group that inevitably had to be assimilated.

=== Iran ===
The diaspora of Circassians in Iran dates back to the end of the 15th century, when Jonayd of the Ak Koyunlu raided regions of Circassia and carried off prisoners. However, the real large influx of Circassians started by the time of Shah Tahmasp I of the Safavid dynasty, who in four campaigns deported some 30,000 Circassians and Georgians back to Iran. Tahmasp's successors, most notably Shah Abbas, all the way till the time of the Qajar dynasty continued to deport and import hundreds of thousands of Circassians to Iran, while a lesser amount migrated voluntarily. Following the mass expulsion of the native Circassians of the northwest Caucasus in 1864, some of them also migrated to Qajar Iran, where some of these deportees from after 1864 rose to various high ranks such as in the Persian Cossack Brigade, where every member of the army was either Circassian, or any other type of ethnos from the Caucasus. The Circassians in Iran played an important and crucial role in the army, civil administration, and royal harems over the many centuries. Today, they are the third-largest Caucasus derived group in the nation after the Armenians and Georgians.

=== Egypt ===
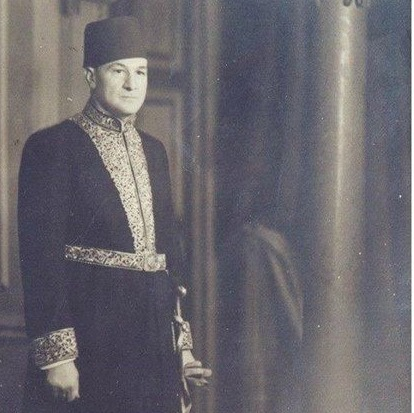
Aziz Pasha Abaza of the House of Abaza, the largest Circassian clan in Egypt

The Circassian diaspora may date back to the end of the fourteenth century: the Circassian population in Egypt claims its descendance from the Mamluks who, during the Mamluk Sultanate, ruled Egypt and Syria. One exception to this is the Abazin community in Egypt which conglomerates in the powerful Abaza Family that claims descent from an Abazin "beloved" female "elder." In Egypt, the Abkhazians took – or were given – the last name "Abaza".

=== Syria ===
In 1987, Syria was home to approximately 100,000 Circassians, about half of whom lived in Hauran province, with many located in the Golan Heights. During the time of the French Mandate for Syria and the Lebanon (1920–1946), Circassians served with the French troops in the "escadron tcherkesse" (Cherkess squadron), earning them enduring distrust from the Syrian Sunni Arabs.

In Quneitra and the Golan Region, there was a large Circassian community. In 1938, Several Circassian leaders wanted, for the same reasons as their Assyrian, Kurdish and Bedouin counterparts in Al-Jazira province in 1936–1937, a special autonomy status for their region. This was because they feared the prospect of living in an independent Syrian republic under a nationalist Arab government hostile towards the minorities that had collaborated with the colonial power. They also wanted the Golan region to become a national homeland for Circassian refugees from the Caucasus. A Circassian battalion served in the French army and had helped it against the Arab nationalist uprisings. Like in Al-Jazira Province, the French authorities refused to grant any autonomy status to the Golan Circassians.

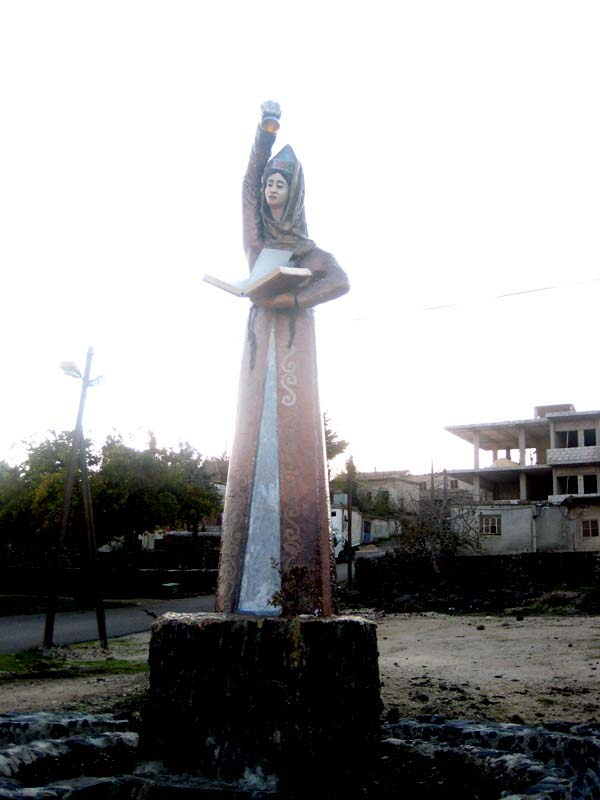
Statue of Satanaya in the Circassian village of Beer Ajam, Syria, before destruction

The Circassians of Syria were actively involved in the 1948 Arab-Israeli war as a unit under the leadership of Jawad Anzor. 200 Circassians were killed in action. They performed well, but the overall failure to stop the founding of Israel led to the special Circassian unit being disbanded. After the Six-Day War of 1967, they withdrew further into Syria, especially to Damascus and Aleppo. They were prevented from returning to the Golan Heights by Israeli occupying forces, but after 1973 some of the returned. They are now living in two villages, Beer Ajam and Bariqa, where they maintain a traditionally Circassian way of life.

The Circassians in Syria are generally well off. They have very good relations with minorities like Alawites, Druze, Christians and Jews. Many of them work for the government, in civil service, or for the military. The former Syrian interior minister and director of the military police, Bassam Abdel Majeed, was a Circassian. All Circassians learn Arabic and English in school; many speak Adyghe language, but their numbers are dwindling. One kindergarten in Damascus provides Adyghe language education. However, there are no Circassian newspapers, and few Circassian books are printed in Syria. Cultural events play an important role in maintaining the ethnic identity of the Circassians. During holidays and weddings, they perform folk dances and songs in their traditional dress.

=== Jordan ===
Between 1878 and 1904, Circassians founded five villages in Jordan: Amman (1878), Wadi al-Sir (1880), Jerash (1884), Na'ur (1901), and al-Rusayfa (1904). Since then, the Circassians have had a major role in the development of Jordan, holding high positions in the Jordanian government, armed forces, air force and police. In 1921, Circassians were granted the position of the personal trusted royal guards of King Abdullah the First. Since then, the Circassians have been the royal guard, serving all four of the Jordanian Kings, King Abdullah the First, King Talal the First, King Hussein the First and King Abdullah the Second. In 1932, the Circassian Charity Association was established, making it the second oldest charity group in Jordan. In 1944, Al-Ahli Club was founded, which is a Circassian sports club. In 1950, Al-Jeel Al-Jadeed club opened, aiming to preserve the Circassian Culture. In 2009, the Circassian Culture Academy was founded, aiming to preserve the Circassian language, which comprises the closely related Adyghe and Kabardian languages (considered to be dialects of Circassian by some linguists). In 1994, the Al-Ahli Club established a Circassian folklore dance troupe. The Circassian Culture Academy also has a Circassian Folklore Dance troupe named the Highlanders.

On 21 May 2011, the Circassian community in Jordan organised a protest in front of the Russian embassy in opposition to the Sochi 2014 Winter Olympics, because the site of the Games was allegedly being built over the site of mass graves of Circassians killed during the Circassian genocide of 1864.

=== Iraq ===
Iraq is home to approximately 35,000 Circassians, of mainly West Circassian origin. The Adyghes came to Iraq in two waves: directly from Circassia, and later from the Balkans. They settled in all parts of Iraq – from north to south – but most of all in Iraq's capital Baghdad. It has been reported that there are 30,000 Adyghe families just in Baghdad alone. Many also settled in Kerkuk, Diyala, Fallujah, and other places. Circassians played a major role in different periods throughout Iraq's history, and made great contributions to political and military institutions in the country, to the Iraqi Army in particular. Several Iraqi Prime Ministers have been of Circassian descent.

The Iraqi Circassians mainly speak Mesopotamian Arabic and West Circassian.

=== Israel ===
There are five to ten thousand Circassians in Israel, living mostly in Kfar Kama (5,005) and Rehaniya (5,000). These two villages were a part of a larger group of Circassian villages around the Golan Heights. As is the case with Jewish Israelis, and the Druze population living within Israel, Circassian men must complete mandatory military service upon reaching the age of majority. Many Circassians in Israel are employed in the security forces, including in the Israel Border Police, the Israel Defense Forces, the Israel Police and the Israel Prison Service.

=== Libya ===
Around 35,000 Circassians live in Libya, most of them are in the city of Misrata 200 km east of Tripoli.

=== Cyprus ===
In Cyprus, the Circassians have settled in the villages of Tserkezoi and Tsiflikoudia, near Limassol.

== Europe ==
=== Kosovo ===
A small minority of Circassians had lived in Kosovo Polje since the late 1880s, as mentioned by Noel Malcolm in his seminal work about that province, but they were repatriated to the Republic of Adygea in southern Russia in the late 1990s.

=== Poland ===
A small population of 26 Circassian-speakers lived in Congress Poland in the Russian Partition of Poland, according to the 1897 census.

=== Romania ===
There is evidence for the presence of people in the principalities of Moldavia and Wallachia with names derived from the Circassians. Furthermore, following the Circassian genocide, around 10,000 Circassians settled in Northern Dobruja, a region now pertaining to Romania. They were later expelled as agreed in the Treaty of San Stefano of 1878, which gave the region to Romania, avoiding any prominent contact between the Romanian state and the Dobrujan Circassians.

== Current situation ==
Circassians refer to their diaspora as a genocide; the diaspora is "perhaps the most pressing issue in the region and the most difficult to solve." In 2006, the Russian State Duma refused to accept a petition by the Circassian Congress that would have called the Russian–Circassian War an act of genocide. Hazret Sovmen, President of the Republic of Adygea from 2002 to 2007, referred to the Circassian diaspora as an enduring tragedy and a national catastrophe, claiming the Circassians live in more than fifty countries across the world, most of them far from their "historical homeland". The International Circassian Organization promotes the interests of Circassians, and the advent of the Internet has brought "a sort of virtual Circassian nation" into being.

== Statistics by country ==
Country	Official figures	%	Current est. Circassian population	Further information
Russia	751,487 (2021 census)	0.58%	—	—
Turkey	(1965 census, Circassian speakers)	0.34%	1,400,000	Circassians in Turkey
Syria	—N/a	—N/a	100,000	Circassians in Syria
Jordan	—N/a	—N/a	180,300	Circassians in Jordan
Iraq	—N/a	—N/a	35,000	Circassians in Iraq
Israel	—N/a	—N/a	4,000	Circassians in Israel
United Kingdom	—N/a	—N/a	3,000	
Kazakhstan	1,700 (1989 census)	0.01%	—	—
Uzbekistan	1,300 (1989 census)	0.01%	—	—
Ukraine	1,100 (2001 census)	0%	—	—
Georgia	800 (1989 census)	0.01%	—	—
Azerbaijan	600−700 (1989 census)	0.01%	—	—
Austria	300−500 (2018 annually statistics)			
Bulgaria	500 (2011 census)	0%	—	—
Turkmenistan	300−400 (1995 census)	0.01%	—	—
Armenia	200 (1989 census)	0%	—	—
Belarus	200 (2009 census)	0%	—	—
Moldova	99 (1989 census)	0%	—	—
Latvia	50−100 (2018 annually statistics)	0%	—	—
Tajikistan	86 (1989 census)	0%	—	—
Kyrgyzstan	50 (2009 census)	0%	—	—
Estonia	21 (1989 census)	0%	—	—
Lithuania	11 (1989 census)	0%	—	—

== See also ==
- Circassian nationalism
- Abaza family
- Circassians in Iran
- Circassians in Iraq
- Circassians in Israel
- Circassians in Syria
- Circassians in Turkey
- Azgeriyev
