= List of Circassian ethnic enclaves =

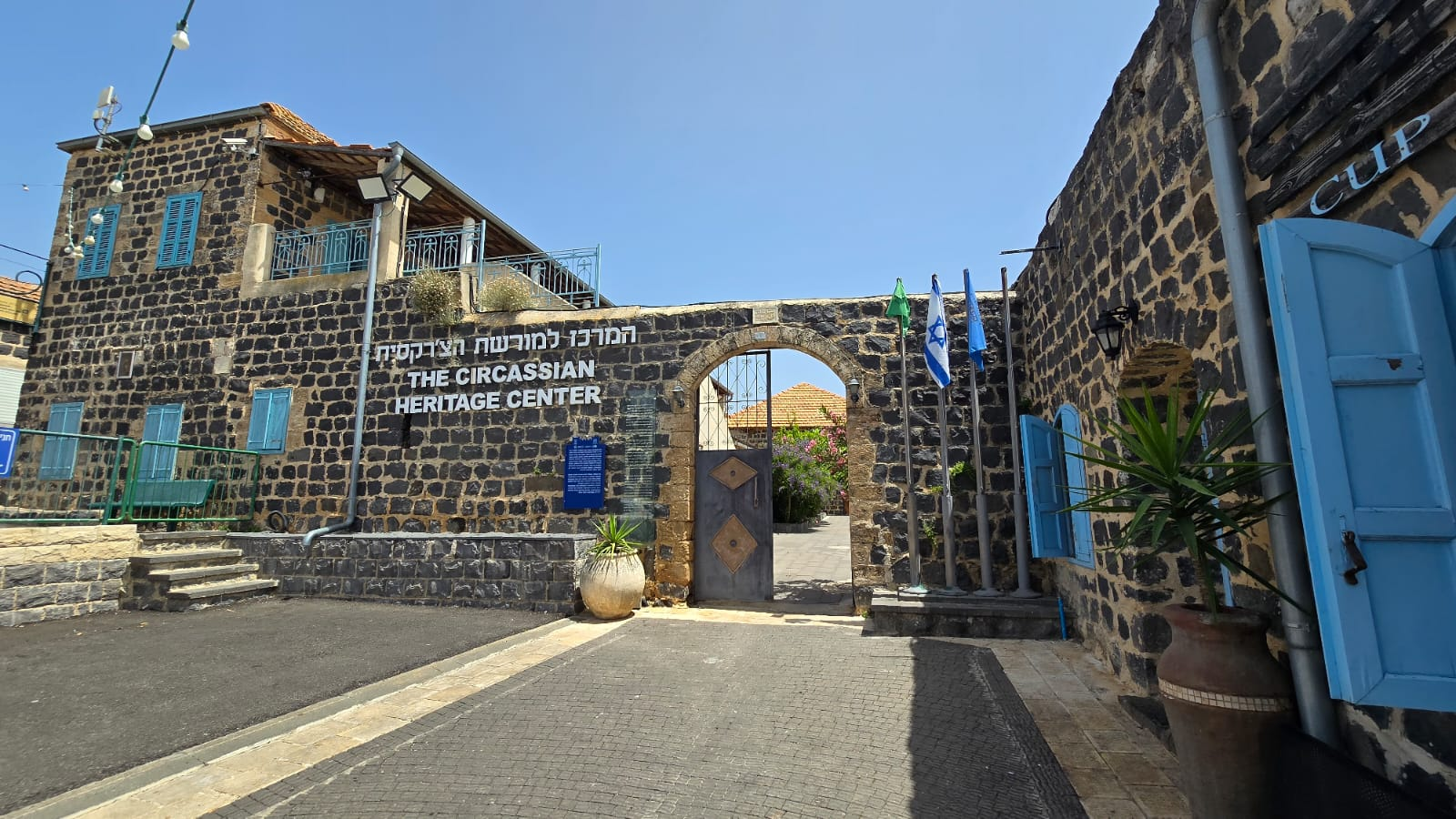
Circassian center in Kfar Kama, one of the biggest Circassian ethnic enclaves in the Middle East.

This is a list of Circassian ethnic enclaves, containing cities, districts, and neighborhoods with predominantly Circassian population, or are associated with Circassian culture, either currently or historically. Most numbers are estimates by various organizations and media, because many countries simply do not collect data on ethnicity.

== Extant enclaves ==
=== Middle East ===
| Name | Type | Location | Circassian population | % | Ref |
|---|---|---|---|---|---|
| Kfar Kama | village | Israel | 3.500 | ~100% | |
| Rehaniya | village | Israel | 1.249 | ~100% | |
| Abu-Humama | village | Syria, Homs Province | ~100% | | |
| Tal-Amri | village | Syria, Homs Province | ~100% | | |
| Asela | village | Syria, Homs Province | ~100% | | |
| Ayni-Nasir | village | Syria, Homs Province | ~100% | | |
| Merzhidor | village | Syria, Homs Province | ~100% | | |
| Anzat | village | Syria, Homs Province | ~100% | | |
| Tlil | village | Syria, Homs Province | ~100% | | |
| Homs | town | Syria, Homs Province | Minority | | |
| Aleppo | town | Syria, Aleppo Province | Minority | | |
| Khanasir | town | Syria, Aleppo Province | Minority | | |
| Tammeswan | village | Syria, Aleppo Province | Minority | | |
| Damascus | town | Syria, Damascus Province | Minority | | |
| Marj al-Sultan | village | Syria, Damascus Province | 1.860 | ~100% | |
| Beer Ajam | village | Syria, Quneitra Province | 353 | ~100% | |
| Bareka | village | Syria, Quneitra Province | ~100% | | |
| Jueza | village | Syria, Quneitra Province | ~100% | | |
| Ayn-Ziwan | village | Syria, Quneitra Province | ~100% | | |
| Salmanyah | village | Syria, Quneitra Province | ~100% | | |
| Mumsyah | village | Syria, Quneitra Province | ~100% | | |
| Faham | village | Syria, Quneitra Province | ~100% | | |
| Mansura | village | Syria, Quneitra Province | ~100% | | |
| Mudaryah | village | Syria, Quneitra Province | ~100% | | |

== Extinct enclaves ==
| Name | Type | Current location | Period | Circassian population & %(date) | Ref |
|---|---|---|---|---|---|
| Cerchezu | village | Constanta, Romania | 19th century | ~100% | |
| Slava Cercheză | village | Tulcea, Romania | 19th century | ~100% | |
| Suwaylih | village | Amman, Jordan | | Minority | |
| Quneitra | town | Syria, Quneitra Province | 20th century | Majority | |
| Khishniyyah | village | Syria, Quneitra Province | 20th century | Majority | |

== See also ==
- Circassian diaspora
- Circassia
- Ethnic enclave
