= Jawdat Said =

Syrian scholar (1931–2022)

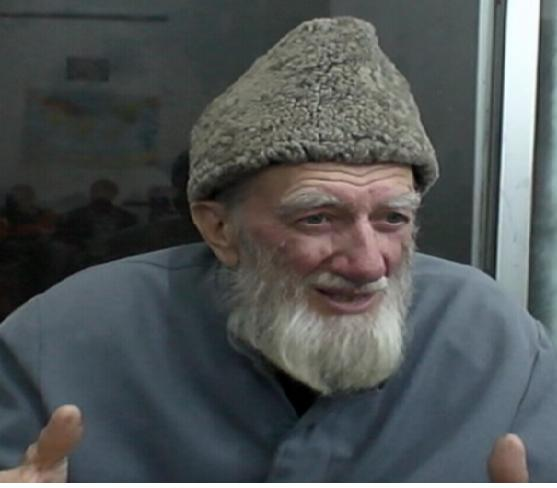
- Said in 2006
- Born: 31 January 1931; Beer Ajam, Syria
- Died: 30 January 2022 (aged 90); Istanbul, Turkey

Philosophical work
- Era: Modern era
- Region: Middle East
- Main interests: Nonviolence, history, Islam, science and knowledge
- Notable ideas: Nonviolence in Islam

Tsey Jawdat Said (Adyghe: Цэй Джэудэт Сахьид; Arabic: جودت سعيد; 31 January 1931 – 30 January 2022) was a Syrian-Circassian Sunni Islamic scholar who belonged to the School of the famous Islamic thinkers professor Malek Bennabi and Muhammad Iqbal. He was called the Arab Gandhi for his pacifistic opinions.

== Biography ==
Said was born on 31 January 1931 in the village of Beer Ajam in Quneitra Governorate in the Golan Heights in Syria, heavily populated by Circassians. He completed his primary education in the city of Quneitra, then his father sent him to continue his studies in Egypt (Al-Azhar) in 1946, where he completed the secondary studies. He studied in the Faculty of Arabic Language, and got a degree in Arabic language.

On 1956 he encountered Professor Malek Bennabi in the last stages of his presence in Egypt through the book ((rebirth)). He immediately felt that Malik had something different, soon he had the opportunity to meet him personally before leaving Egypt for good.

Said left Cairo for Saudi Arabia, where he lived almost a year, during which the United Arab Republic by the union between Syria and Egypt came into existence. Said then returned to Syria (known then as the Northern Region of the United Arab Republic) to complete military service; while he was in the army, the separation of the union took place. While everyone complied with the orders given by commanders in the military, he clearly opposed participation in any military actions against the "Union", leading officials to put him under military internal detention, and did not leave until after the end of the matter.

He finished military service and was appointed to be a teacher at Damascus high schools of Arabic language. No sooner had he started than he was arrested for his intellectual activity. Despite repeated arrests and the issuance of decisions to move him to schools in various regions across Syria, he did not leave the field of teaching until a decision was made to discharge him from his work in the late 1960s.

After the 1973 war, the city of Quneitra and some villages of the occupied Syrian Golan Heights were liberated. Among the liberated villages after being occupied for almost 6 years, was Ber Ajam. Now that he was unemployed, Said decided to return to settle there and restore the house with his family. Said lived there, working in beekeeping, agriculture, and keeping up with the intellectual activities, and abreast of developments and discussions in the Arab, Islamic, and global arena.

Said died in Istanbul on 30 January 2022, at the age of 90.

== Views on jihad and peace ==
Jawdat Said argued that the prophets of Islam tried to bring about change in humanity through non-violent means. He pointed out the Muhammad in Mecca refused to use violence. He argued Muhammad in Medina only resorted to jihad to establish justice. From that he derived that Muslims should never start a conflict, and should call people to Islam through peaceful means. A war can only be waged by an elected government and for the aim of establishing justice and ending persecution. Even so, war should be governed by mature and rational authorities and force should be proportionate.

While Said criticized Middle Eastern regimes as despotic and also rejected American hegemony, he called on Muslims to peacefully resist both. He cited the example of the Japanese under occupation after World War II and believed Muslims should cope with American hegemony through science and economic development.

== His works and writings ==
=== Religion and Law, 2001 (In English and Arabic) ===
From the introduction of the book:

"We live in a world in which four fifths of its population live in frustration while the other fifth lives in fear. The United Nations, our world's "figleaf," does not hide the shame of humanity but rather scandalizes humanity's malaise. It is troubling that the League of Nations and the United Nations were born after two world wars. Humanity's unity should come as a natural birth and not as the result of a caesarean section, i.e., through violent global wars. This is reminiscent of the ages of epidemics. Then, because of ignorance about the causes behind these illnesses, plagues swept through communities, leaving millions of dead behind. Yet, after technology made it possible for us to see smaller forms of life and medicine brought us a better understanding of germs, communities became better equipped to halt disease and heal the sufferers.

If a country now is devastated by an epidemic, we blame it on the lack of sufficient hygiene. So too, the wars that erupt here and there are caused by ignorance of the intellectual organisms that infect communities with hate and influence people to commit atrocities. In today's world, relying on science, we concern ourselves with preventing germ warfare while sheltering the intellectual viruses that destroy us: our intellectual foods are still polluted. We cannot afford to continue to be confused or ignorant about these invasive germs".

=== The Doctrine of the First Son of Adam, 1964 (in Arabic and English) ===
Through this book (The Doctrine of the First Son of Adam or The Problem of Violence in The Islamic Action), Said presented his idea of the non-violence in the Islamic Action, he explained the story of the Son of Adam mentioned in the Koran. The story says that the two sons of presented a sacrifice (to Allah): it was accepted from one, but not from the other. The latter said: "Be sure I will slay thee." "Surely," said the former, "Allah doth accept of the sacrifice of those who are righteous. [28] "If thou dost stretch thy hand against me, to slay me, it is not for me to stretch my hand against thee to slay thee: for I do fear Allah, the Cherisher of the Worlds. [29] "For me, I intend to let thee draw on thyself my sin as well as thine, for thou wilt be among the Companions of the Fire, and that is the reward of those who do wrong."

The book appeared in the mid-1960s, before the emergence of the (Ikhwan) trend in Syria and the incidents of violence and widespread arrests among activists. Some believe that Said's experience in Egypt, recognizing that what has been between the Authority and the Muslim Brotherhood there is expected to be repeated in Syria. Jawdat's first book appeared only after he was arrested for the first time on a background of his intellectual activity. After the experience of detention, he felt that it was necessary to write down some of the ideas he had in mind, especially those related to nonviolence.

Said distinguishes between the Islamic Jihad in the phase of building the (state), and Jihad after that. This was in response to some rejection raised on the idea claiming that non-violence contradicts jihad (in the sense of fighting), It is proven that the Prophet (Mohammed) had exercised during his time. Jihad at the phase of building the state or good governance should use nonviolent jihad. Access to power and rule by force and sword is not acceptable in Islam at all. A change that happens by force does not change the society in deed, but Hercules comes and Hercules goes, therefore, Prophet (Mohammed) prevented his followers from defending themselves while they were in Mecca, but permitted them to fight only after an adult community in the city of Medina was established without violence, but by persuading the public, when the adult community (or the Democratic in modern terms) is built it becomes his duty to stand by the oppressed and defend its peace.

=== Until they change what is in themselves, 1972 (in Arabic and English) ===
Said makes of the Quranic verse (God does not change a people until they change what is in themselves) a title and a starting point, to prove that in order to solve a problem or change a situation, the priority of change starts from ourselves.

Said argues that the law in this verse, is general and applies to all human beings, and not especially Muslims, and that it is a social Law not individual law, and that it contains two phases of change: A change done by God and a change by people. The First change is a result of the second, God will not change until the people change first.

The writer concludes his book by saying: "there are many simple Quranic facts we hear but not understand! How many of the disasters arise from this neglect and inattention! How many hundreds of thousands of young people are disappointed, or lose confidence in the seriousness of religious subjects, when they are exposed to the truth, because they live an illusion! It is a problem of a society, the problem of a lost generation replete with illusions."

=== Work Is Ability and Will (in Arabic and English) ===
The writer says that if a firm will for work met with a complete capability and the presence of suitable conditions and the absence of impediments, then the action is compulsory.

Muslims have all the will and the physical capability which can solve their problems and to participate to influence events in the world and face the colonial and intellectual invasion, but he adds that the real destitution is in their understanding of the laws of changing themselves and their communities, as they usually claim their rights, rather than performing their duties, and are concerned with having a state rather than establishing the society, they adopt the pattern of violence and coercion not the scientific method and persuasion...

=== Read! and your Lord is Most generous, 1987 (in Arabic and English) ===
The Rush to condemn "Science" or "knowledge" (which was the original title to this book) holds a great loss, the writer says, because nothing can save us other than "knowledge". What we condemned is either Science (Knowledge) so that we must accept or ignorance so we reject.

The writer states and responds in his book to some common sayings and writings of some Muslims which suggest that "science is unable to solve problems". And that there is something else out there that we should depend on to work out our problems.

=== Be as Adam's son, 1996 (in Arabic) ===
Said discussed nearly all the main topics of his world, he talks in this book about nonviolence, history, language, Quran, science and knowledge, knowledge and Power, the prophetic concept to change, Jihad, the two ways to read Quran, Arnold J. Toynbee and the system of civilization, Michel Foucault and history, truth falsehood and consequences, the difference between the European Union and the United Nations, the difference between the sick and the sickness, UN and veto.

== Influence ==
Said was very influential on a new generation of Syrian non-violence activists including Daraya Youth and Dr Mouhammad Alammar.
