= Circassians in Iraq =

Branch of the Circassian diaspora in Iraq

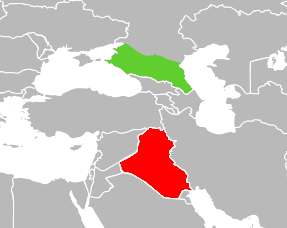
- The North Caucasus (in green) and Iraq (in red).

Total population
- 30,000–50,000

Regions with significant populations
- Baghdad, Sulaymaniyah; Diyala, Kirkuk, Anbar, Najaf

Languages
- Mainly Arabic and Kurdish as well as Adyghe, Chechen, Lezgin, Turkmen

Religion
- Majority: Sunni Islam Minority: Shia Islam

Related ethnic groups
- other North Caucasian peoples

Circassians in Iraq (Note: Adyghe: Иракъым ис Адыгэхэр; Arabic: الشركس في العراق) refer to people born in or residing in Iraq who are of Circassian origin. "Circassians" in Iraq may refer to Circassians proper, but also to other North Caucasian groups. They have been heavily Arabised or Kurdised, and remember little about their background. Like all Iraqis, they have faced various hardships in the modern era, as Iraq suffered wars, sanctions, oppressive regimes, and civil strife. There are lots of officers and commanders among Circassian families in Iraq.

== History ==
Iraqis of North Caucasus origin mainly originate from Circassia. The migration of North Caucasians to Iraq goes back many centuries, peaking in the aftermath of the Russian–Circassian War with the Circassian genocide of the 1860s. The Circassians came to Iraq in two waves: directly from Circassia, and later from the Balkans. Chechens and Dagestanis also settled in Iraq throughout the Ottoman era. Circassians also settled in large numbers in neighbouring countries, among them Turkey, Syria, Jordan, and Palestine.

== Demographics ==
The name "Circassian" usually denotes speakers of Northwest Caucasian languages only, however in Western Asia the name may denote North Caucasus peoples in general, including Chechens and Dagestanis, who speak Northeast Caucasian languages.

The overall number of Circassians or people of North Caucasus origin in Iraq is estimated to be between 30,000 and 50,000, however the total number is unknown. It has been reported that there are 30,000 Adyghe families in Baghdad alone. It is understood that many North Caucasians have ethnically assimilated into the Iraqi population, becoming Arabicized or Kurdicized.

Surnames such as Al-Daghestani, Al-Shishani ("Chechen"), and Al-Sharkas ("Circassian") are common among Iraqis of North Caucasian descent.

=== Population ===
North Caucasians have settled in all parts of Iraq, from Duhok in the north to Basrah in the south. The largest communities are in Baghdad, Sulaymaniyah, Diyala, Kirkuk, and Fallujah, with smaller communities in Najaf, Hillah, Mosul, Kut, Basrah, Tikrit, Erbil, Nasiriyah, Diwaniyah, Duhok, Ramadi, Amarah, and Tuz Khormato.

There are also several Circassian villages throughout Iraq, including a neighbourhood in Baghdad.

=== Culture ===
Although heavily Arabised, they continue to preserve certain traditions in wedding ceremonies, birth ceremonies, and other special occasions, and to cook their traditional cuisine. In 2004, the Al-Tadamun Society of Iraqi, Chechen, Dagestani and Circassian Tribes was formed in Kirkuk. This cultural organization seeks to bring together Iraqis of North Caucasian heritage. "Al-Tadamun" can be translated as "Solidarity". North Caucasians in Iraq are predominantly Sunni Muslim like their ethnic counterparts in other countries. It is possible that a minority may also identify with Shia Islam, the majority faith in Iraq.

=== Language ===
North Caucasians in Iraq speak a number of languages, including their native languages of either Adyghe, Chechen, or Lezgin, as well as Mesopotamian Arabic, Kurdish, or Turkmen. The native languages are mainly spoken by the elder generations, with younger people speaking only Arabic or Kurdish, the main Iraqi languages.

== See also ==
- Circassians in Syria
- Circassians in Turkey
- Circassians in Iran
- Circassian diaspora
