= Said Mohammad Sammour =

Syrian politician (born 1950)

- سعيد محمد سمور

Minister of Interior
- In office 23 April 2009 – 29 March 2011
- President: Bashar al-Assad
- Prime Minister: Muhammad Naji al-Otari
- Preceded by: Bassam Abd al-Majid
- Succeeded by: Mohammad al-Shaar

Deputy Director of Military Intelligence
- In office 2005–2009

Personal details
- Born: 1950 (age 75–76) Jableh
- Party: Ba'ath Party

Military service
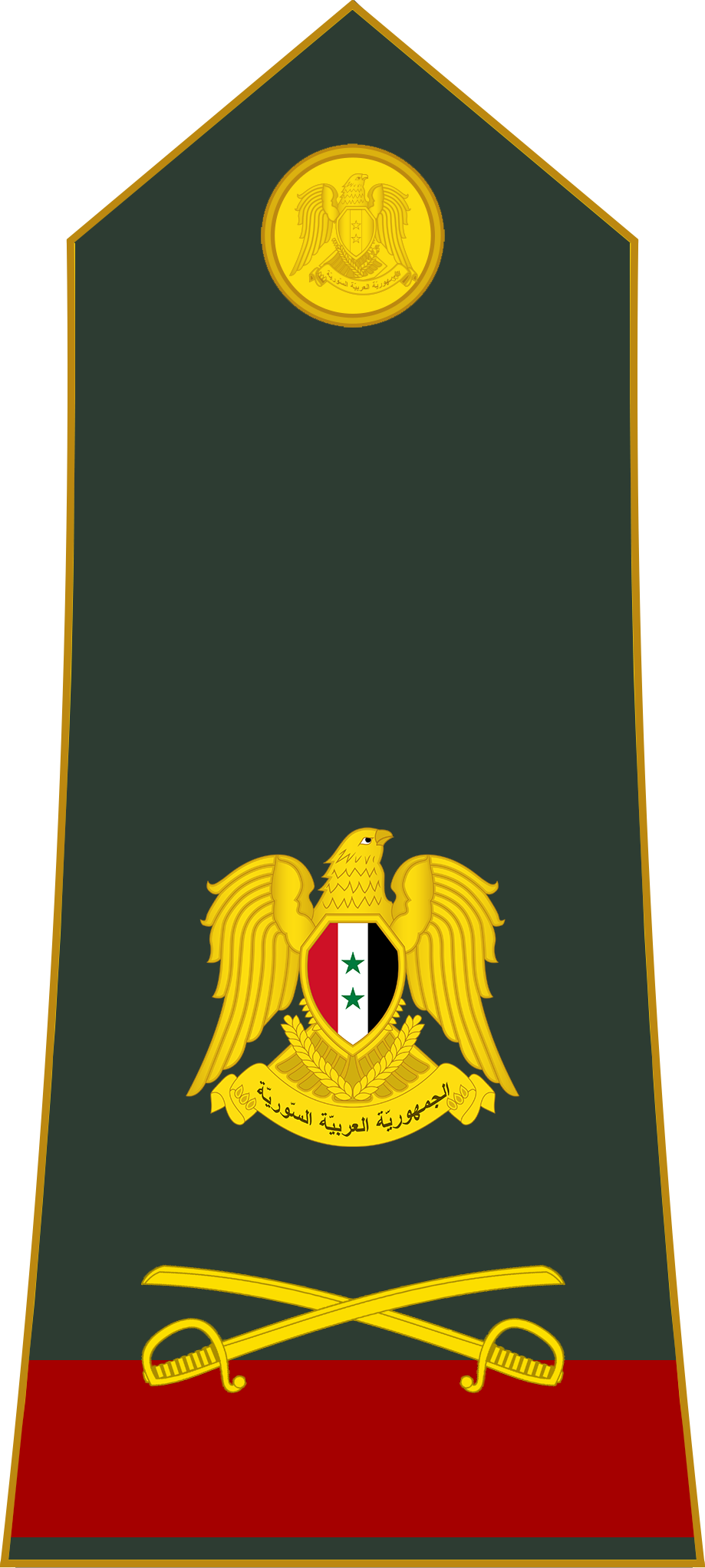
- Rank: Major general

Said Mohammad Sammour (Arabic: سعيد محمد سمور) (born 1950) is a Syrian military officer and politician who served as interior minister between 2009 and 2011.

== Early life and education ==
Sammour was born in Jableh in 1950. He received a bachelor of arts degree in English literature. He also holds a diploma in aeronautical science.

== Career ==
Sammour is a former major general. He was the chief of Syrian military intelligence in Homs. He also served in the same post in charge with the Damascus Region. Then he was appointed deputy chief of the military intelligence in 2005, and served in the post until 2009.

On 23 April 2009, Sammour was appointed interior minister to the cabinet headed by Prime Minister Mohammad Naji al-Otari, replacing Bassam Abdel Majid in the post. In April 2011, Sammour was replaced by Mohammad al-Shaar as interior minister.

== Personal life ==
Sammour is married and has four children.

Political offices
Preceded by Bassam Abdel Majid	Interior Minister; 2009 – 2011	Succeeded by Mohammad Al Shaar
