= Asiliyah =

Asiliyah عسيلة Usaylah
- Village
- Location in Syria
- Coordinates: 34°57′24″N 36°50′53″E
- Country: Syria
- Governorate: Homs
- District: Rastan
- Subdistrict: Rastan

Population (2004)
  - Total: 360
- Time zone: UTC+3 (EET)
  - Summer (DST): UTC+2 (EEST)

Asiliyah (Arabic: عسيلة, also known as Usaylah or Asila) is a village in northern Syria, administratively part of the Rastan District, located north of Homs on the southern banks of the Orontes River. According to the Syria Central Bureau of Statistics (CBS), Asiliyah had a population of 360 in the 2004 census. Its inhabitants are predominantly Circassians from the Bzhedug and Shapsugh tribes.
