= Tell Sinan =

Tell Sinan تل سنان Nasharzi
- Village
- Location in Syria
- Coordinates: 35°7′33″N 37°7′20″E
- Country: Syria
- Governorate: Hama
- District: Salamiyah
- Subdistrict: Salamiyah

Population (2004)
  - Total: 1,061
- Time zone: UTC+3 (AST)
- City Qrya Pcode: C3216

Tell Sinan (Arabic: تل سنان, romanized: Tall Sīnān), also known by its residents as Nasharzi, is a village in central Syria, administratively part of the Salamiyah District of the Hama Governorate. It is located 52 kilometers (32 mi) east of Hama and 17 kilometers (11 mi) west of Salamiyah. According to the Syria Central Bureau of Statistics (CBS), Tell Sinan had a population of 1,061 in the 2004 census. Around 40% of the inhabitants Circassians, descendants of the village's founders, and the remainder are local Bedouin.

== History ==
The modern village of Tell Sinan was founded between 1858 and 1860. Its first settlers were Circassians from the Bajdugh tribe, followed by a second group from the Abzakh tribe. The Circassians originally fled their homeland due to the Russian invasion of the Caucasus and were eventually resettled in Syria by the Ottoman government. In 1883 one of the first mosques in the vicinity was built in the village under the orders of Sultan Abdul Hamid I. One of the first elementary schools in the Salamiyah area was founded in Tell Sinan in 1910.

In the 20th century, many of the Circassians moved to the major cities of Syria, namely Damascus, Aleppo, Hama and Homs, while Bedouin from the area settled in the village. As of 2010, about 400 of its 1,000 inhabitants were Circassians, who alternatively refer to the village as 'Nasharzi' after their purported village of origin in the Caucasus, and the remainder were of Bedouin descent.
