= Circassians in Syria =

Branch of the Circassian diaspora in Syria

Сирием ис Адыгэхэр الشركس في سوريا
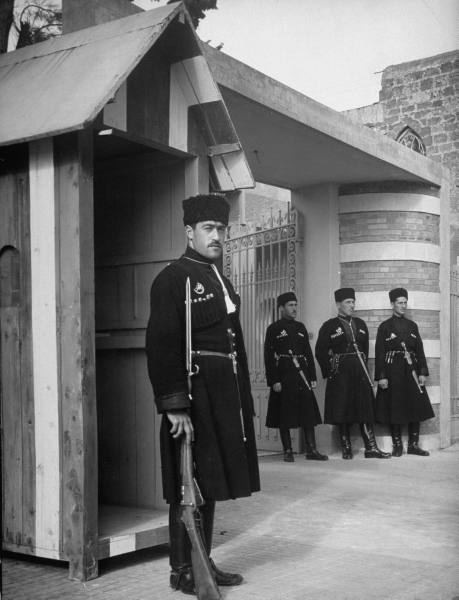
- Circassians in the French Mandate Legion in Syria

Total population
- 40,000–100,000 (pre-Civil War estimates)

Regions with significant populations
- Quneitra Governorate, Damascus, Aleppo area (particularly Khanasir, Ras el Ain and Manbij), smaller communities in the areas of Homs and Hama

Languages
- Mostly Arabic and Circassian languages Smaller numbers also speak Abkhaz

Religion
- Sunni Islam

Related ethnic groups
- Other Circassians, Chechens in Syria

Circassians in Syria (Note: Circassian: Сирием ис Адыгэхэр, Siriëm is Adygekher; Arabic: الشركس في سوريا) refer to the Circassian diaspora that settled in Syria (then part of the Ottoman Empire) in the 19th century. They moved to Syria after the Circassian genocide following the Russo-Circassian War. While they have become an increasingly assimilated part of Syrian society, they have maintained a distinct identity; they have retained their language (in addition to Arabic), their tribal heritage, and some of their other traditional customs.

Prior to the Syrian Civil War, the Circassian population was estimated to be around 100,000. Since the decade-long conflict began in 2011, the predominantly Sunni Muslim population of ethnic Circassians in Syria has dwindled.

Many of Syria's ethnic Circassians have left the country and have repatriated or are in the process of repatriation to the titular Circassian parts of North Caucasia, in particular Adygea, Kabardino-Balkaria and Karachay-Cherkessia, as well as to Abkhazia.

In 2018, John Shoup said that the Circassian population in Syria formed about 1% of the country's total population; making them one of the smallest ethnic groups in the country.

== History ==
=== Exile and resettlement ===
Circassians began a forced migration from their homeland in the Northwest Caucasus region to the Ottoman Empire following the Russian–Circassian War and the subsequent Circassian genocide in 1864. While they originally settled in parts of Anatolia and the Balkans, they began emigrating to the empire's Syrian provinces (the Levant) in large numbers (about 70,000) after the Ottoman defeat in the Balkan War of 1877–78. That group of Circassians was mostly resettled by the Ottoman authorities as part of an effort to counterbalance increasing dissent by the local population in Syria, far from the capital Istanbul, with more loyal subjects of the empire. Many Circassians settled in the Golan Heights and Transjordan, then part of the Province of Damascus. In the late 1870s, Circassians established a number of villages north of Homs and along the borders of the Syrian Desert, as well as in the area surrounding Damascus, namely Marj al-Sultan and al-Dumayr. Circassians eventually abandoned the latter town.

Nearly all the Circassian villages founded in Ottoman Syria were located on conflict fronts, mostly involving the Druze and Bedouin tribes, including the 'Annizah and Al Fadl. Since the Circassians were militarily able to resist the khuwwa ("unofficial 'protection' tax") demanded of the local peasantry by various Bedouin tribes—which came at the detriment of government tax collection—they reached agreements that mutually benefited the two factions. Nonetheless, clashes periodically erupted between the Circassians of the Golan and Ghouta (rural Damascus) regions and the Bedouin. The most severe local conflicts were with the Druze, who dominated the area of Mount Hermon in the northern Golan Heights and the Jabal al-Druze region to the east. Historians have asserted that the Ottomans encouraged Circassian settlement in this region to serve as a pro-sultanate buffer between the two Druze-inhabited areas. In addition, Circassians generally favored residence in the Golan as compared to the city because the area resembled the Caucasian ancestral lands with its wooded mountains, heavy rainfall and snow. In Aleppo, 2500 Circassian families were settled in Ras al-Ayn by the Ottomans.

In the first decade of the 20th century, the Ottoman government facilitated a wave of Circassian resettlement to the northern Euphrates River. They largely left the Caucasus on their own accord, fearing forcible conversion to the Russian Orthodox Church by Czarist forces. A Kabardian group initially settled in Raqqa, establishing their new settlement immediately west of the Arab-dominated town. Funds from the provincial treasury and local contributors enabled each immigrant family to own a plot of land, a two-room house, a horse stable, two oxen and five grain sacks. Talustan Anzor, the leader of this Kabardian faction, acquired prestige in the Raqqa District as a noted mediator of disputes. Together with Manbij and Khanasser, two other towns in the Euphrates valley, the Kabardian settlements were meant to serve as a strategic ring around Raqqa where the gendarmerie could be conveniently recruited.

In Circassian narratives of these years, there were rarely any negative words against the local Arab population, which welcomed the Circassian immigrants. Because of their Muslim religion, which was the dominant faith in Syria, and their arrival to the region well before the struggle for independence from the Ottomans and later the French, the Circassians played a role in the founding of the modern state of Syria and immediately became full citizens. However, because of the creation of a number of Circassian cavalry units within the French Army of the Levant, and particularly due to their role in quelling the Druze forces of Sultan Pasha al-Atrash during the Great Syrian Revolt (1925–27), relations with the Arab majority became somewhat tense in the early years of the republic. A minority of Circassians in the Golan Heights petitioned for autonomy from Damascus during the French Mandatory years.

=== Post-independence ===
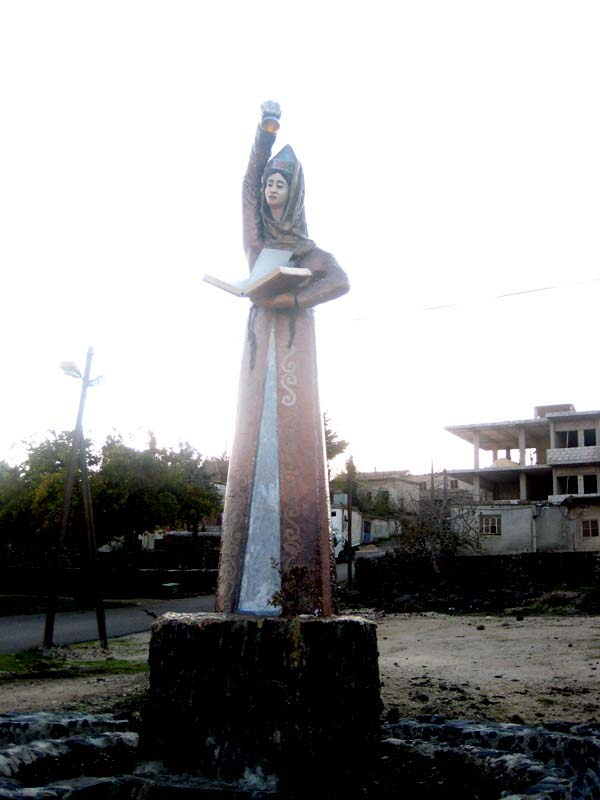
Statue of Satanaya in the Circassian village of Beer Ajam, in the Golan Heights region of Syria. The statue has been destroyed by terrorists.

Following Syria's independence from French control in 1946, Circassian-dominated military units were disbanded. During the 1948 Arab–Israeli War, a few were hastily reassembled as part of the Syrian Army and put under the command of Jawad Anzor. About 200 soldiers from this unit, including Anzor, were killed during the war. After the Syrian defeat in the 1967 Six-Day War, the Circassian population largely fled the Golan Heights region, which was occupied by the Israeli Army. Most relocated to the cities of Damascus and Aleppo, while many later moved to the United States (particularly Paterson, New Jersey, New York City and Orange County, California), Canada, Germany, Austria and the Netherlands. Some Circassians returned to villages east of the ceasefire line with the Israeli-occupied Golan Heights, namely Beer Ajam and Bariqa after the 1973 Yom Kippur War.

=== Civil war ===
Circassians generally stayed neutral during the Syrian Civil War between the government and anti-government rebels, which began in March 2011. However, a significant number serve in the security apparatus, including the military, while a number have either defected, or have joined rebel ranks. At least 35 Circassians have been reported killed during the conflict, and clashes between the rebels and the Syrian Army have occurred in both Beer Ajam and Bariqa as well as in Marj Sultan near Damascus, all three being Circassian villages. According to journalist Fahim Tastakin, writing in the Turkish newspaper Radikal, as of November 2012, 250 Circassians fled to Turkey, while 5,000 "want to come." The Anadolu Agency reported in late January 2013, that the number of Syrian Circassians who have sought asylum in Turkey was 700. The majority resided with family members instead of camps hosting Syrian refugees. Another common destination was Jordan, south of Syria, where some Circassian families have relatives. Many Circassians pushed for repatriation in the various North Caucasus republics and oblasts of Russia. About 400 settled in Kabardino-Balkaria, 220 in Adygea and 40 in Karachay-Cherkessia. Tastikin writes a total of 1,200 left for Russia.

On 21st May 2025, Syrian Circassians publicly marked the Day of Mourning in Syria for the first time, with a vigil in Umayyad Square, Damascus. Commemoration of the genocide had been banned under the Baathist government due to its close ties with the Soviet Union and the Russian Federation.

== Culture ==
In the past, Syria's Circassian community mainly spoke Adyghe and today many still speak Adyghe among themselves, although all learn Arabic in school, as it is the official language of the state. English is also studied. Unlike other non-Arab Sunni Muslim minorities in Syria, such as the Turkomans, the Circassians have maintained a distinct identity, although in recent times they have become increasingly assimilated. During weddings and holidays, some members of the community wear traditional dress and engage in folk songs and dance.

Circassians are generally well-off, with many being employed in government posts, the civil service and the military. In the rural regions, Circassians are organized by a tribal system. In these areas, the communities mostly engage in agriculture, especially grain cultivation, and raise livestock including horses, cattle, goats and sheep. Many also engage in traditional jobs as blacksmiths, gold and silversmiths, carpenters and stonemasons.

== Population ==
According to statistics provided by the Caucasus Foundation, the Circassian population in 1990 was 28,500, increasing to about 40,000 in 2000. However, the Library of Congress put the number at 100,000 in 1987. Other more recent sources have also estimated the population to be at 100,000, although specific years for the figures are not provided. The Journal of the Turkish Weekly writes the Circassian population to be as high as 130,000. With the advent of the Syrian Civil War and the massive wave of Syrian refugees, many ethnic Circassians have also left the country, with amongst them, many repatriating to their ancestral lands in Russia's Caucasus region. Professor John Shoup said in 2018 that the Circassian population formed about 1% of the country's total population.

=== Geographic distribution ===
Prior to the 1967 War, about half of the Circassian population lived in the Quneitra Governorate, inhabiting 11 villages and the major town of Quneitra. The latter, which had a significant Circassian population, was depopulated during the war and although it is under Syrian control, it has not been resettled. Circassian-dominated villages included Jawziah, Khishniyyah, Ayn Ziwan, Salmaniyah, Mumsiyah, Mansura, Faham, Mudariyah, Ramthaniya, Bariqa and Beer Ajam. Only the latter two have been repopulated, most of the remainder are located in the Israeli-occupied part of the territory. Displaced Circassians continue to claim their lands and homes in the Golan Heights.

Many Circassians have relocated to Damascus after being displaced from the Golan in the 1967 War. Most settled in the Rukn al-Din district of the city, where they form the majority of the residents. The main Circassian population center in the area outside Damascus is the village of Marj al-Sultan, 15 kilometers to the city's east. But all Circassians had to leave this village during the Syrian civil war as it was totally destroyed in 2016. Others had previously moved to the Caucasus after the fall of the Soviet Union.

Aleppo city is another major center, in addition to the nearby town of Khanasir from which many of Aleppo's Circassians had emigrated from. Manbij, northeast of Aleppo, also contains a significant Circassian community. In 1970, the Circassian population in Khanasir and Manbij was 2,500 and 1,500, respectively. Khanasir had been reestablished by Circassian immigrants from Manbij at the turn of the 20th century.

Circassians also reside in seven villages in the Homs Governorate and two in the Hama Governorate in addition to the city of Homs itself. These villages are mostly situated north or east of Homs along the edge of the Syrian Desert and along the eastern banks of the Orontes River. They are Deir Ful, Ayn al-Niser, Abu Hamamah, Murayj al-Durr, Asiliyah, Anzat, Tell Amri, Tell Sinan, Tell Ady and Telil. The last village is located west of Homs, near Houla.

=== Notable people ===
Notable Syrian citizens of Circassian ancestry include:

- Bassam Abdel Majeed – former Syrian interior minister and director of the military police.
- Najdat Anzour – Syrian television and film director.
- Ahmad Nami – 5th Prime Minister of Syria and 2nd President of Syria
- Jawdat Said – a prominent Islamic scholar and nonviolence advocate.
- Feras Esmaeel – footballer
- Yanal Abaza – footballer
- Tamer Haj Mohamad – footballer
- Husam Tahsin Bek – actor and singer
- Nadine Tahsin Bek – actress
- Tulin Mustafa – anchorwoman
- Ali Mamlouk – Deputy Vice President for Security Affairs, former director of National Security Bureau
- Hossam Louka – Head of the General Intelligence Directorate

== See also ==
- Circassians in Iraq
- Circassians in Iran
- Circassians in Turkey

== Bibliography ==
- Burns, Ross (2009). The monuments of Syria: a guide. I. B. Tauris. ISBN 978-1-84511-947-8.
- Chatty, Dawn (2010). Displacement and Dispossession in the Modern Middle East. Cambridge University Press. ISBN 978-0-521-81792-9.
- Gammer, Moshe (2004). The Caspian Region: The Caucasus. Vol. 2. Routledge. ISBN 0203005120.
- Khanam, R. (2005). Encyclopaedic Ethnography of Middle-East and Central Asia. Global Vision Publishing House. ISBN 978-81-8220-062-3.
- Musil, Alois (1928). Palmyrena: A Topographical Itinerary. American Geographical Society.
- Neely, Kari S. (2008). Diasporic Representations: A Study of Circassian and Armenian Identities in Greater Syria. ISBN 978-0-549-51210-3.
