= Talamri =

Talamri تلعمري Tell Amri
- Village
- Location in Syria
- Coordinates: 34.841387°N 36.928139°E
- Country: Syria
- Governorate: Homs
- District: Homs
- Subdistrict: Ayn al-Niser
- Elevation: 472 m (1,549 ft)

Population (2004)
  - Total: 895
- Time zone: UTC+3 (EET)
  - Summer (DST): UTC+2 (EEST)

Talamri (Arabic: تلعمري, also spelled Tell Amri) is a town in central Syria, administratively part of the Homs Governorate, located northeast of Homs. According to the Central Bureau of Statistics (CBS), Talamri had a population of 895 in the 2004 census. The inhabitants of the village are ethnic Circassians from the Abzakh, Shapsugh, Kabardian and Bzhedug tribes.
