= Bassam Abdel Majeed =

- بسام عبد المجيد

Minister of Interior
- In office 11 February 2006 – 23 April 2009
- President: Bashar al-Assad
- Prime Minister: Mohammad Naji Al Otari
- Preceded by: Ghazi Kanaan
- Succeeded by: Said Mohammad Sammour

Ambassador to Belarus
- In office ? – 2019
- President: Bashar al-Assad
- Succeeded by: Farouk Taha

Personal details
- Born: 1950 (age 75–76) Beer Ajam, Syria
- Party: Ba'ath Party

Military service
- Rank: Major General

Bassam Abdel Majeed (Adyghe: Бэсим-Абдулмэджид, romanized: Bəsim-Abdulmədjid; Arabic: بسام عبد المجيد Basām 'Abd al-Majīd; born 1950) is a Syrian military officer, politician and diplomat of Circassian origin.

== Early life and education ==
Majeed is of Circassian origin, and was born into a Sunni Muslim family in 1950 in Beer Ajam, a village in the Quneitra Governorate in southwestern Syria. He attended Syria's Air Force Academy, graduating in 1970.

== Career ==
Majeed held several military and security posts. He was director of the military police from 2003 to 2006. He was appointed the interior minister of Syria on 11 February 2006, succeeding Ghazi Kanaan. When he was in office, Hezbollah commander Imad Mugniyeh was killed in Damascus in February 2008. Majeed blamed Israel and described the attack as a "terrorist act".

Majeed's term lasted until 23 April 2009 and he was replaced by Said Mohammad Sammour. In October 2009, Majeed was appointed Syria's ambassador to Kuwait.

== Personal life ==
Majeed is married, and has two daughters and one son.

Political offices
Preceded by Ghazi Kanaan	Interior Minister; 2006 – 2009	Succeeded by Said Mohammad Sammour
