= Circassians in Saudi Arabia =

СаIудий Хьэрыпыем ис Адыгэхэр (Adyghe) الشركس في السعودية (Arabic)
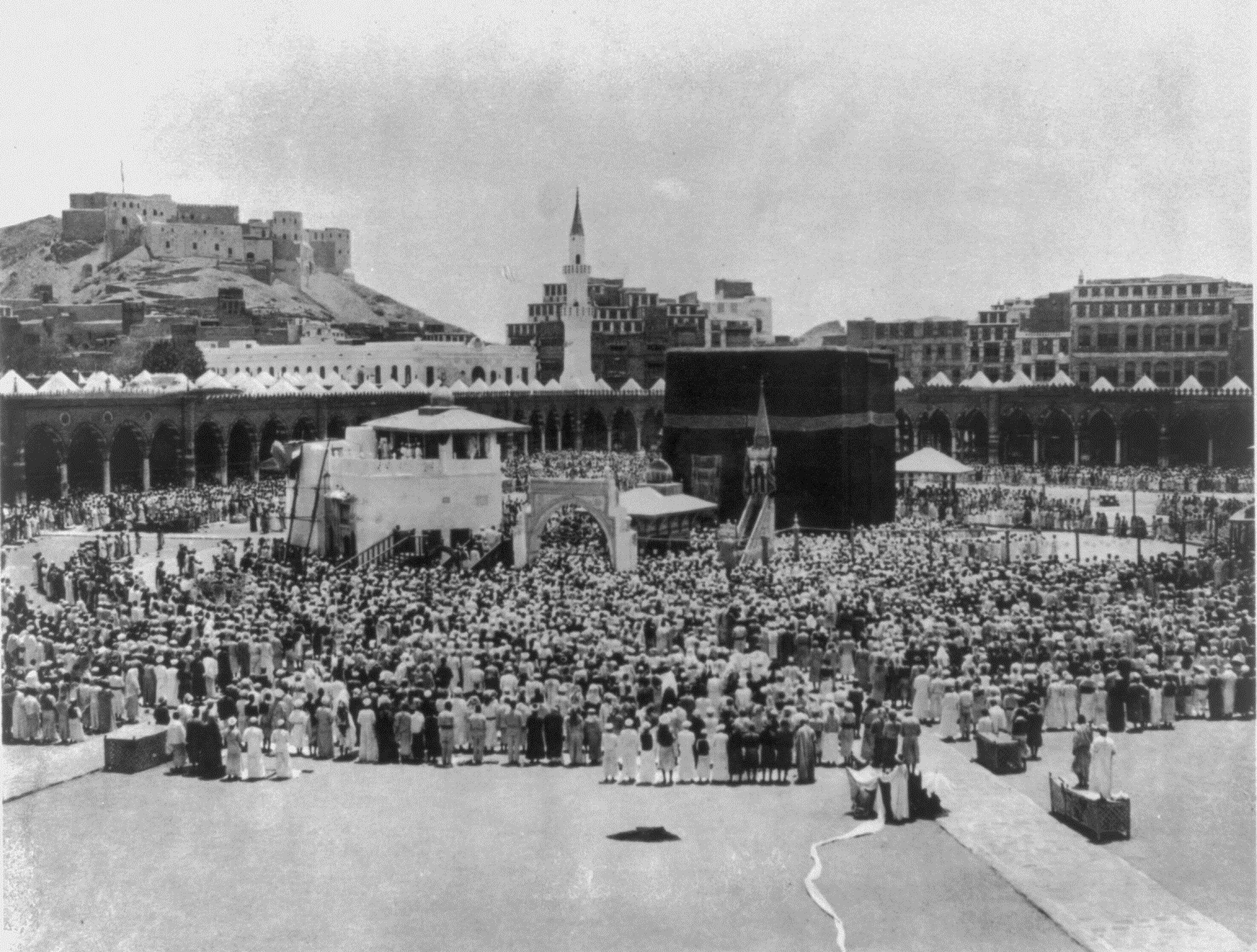
- The Kaaba in Mecca, 19th century, when the Circassians arrived in the region.

Total population
- 15,000-25,000

Languages
- Circassian languages (including East Circassian and West Circassian dialects); Arabic

Religion
- Islam

Related ethnic groups
- other Circassians

The Circassians in Saudi Arabia (Adyghe: СаIудий Хьэрыпыем ис Адыгэхэр, romanized: Saudi Herıpıyem yis Adıǵexer; Arabic: الشركس في السعودية) are a small group of Circassians who live in the Kingdom of Saudi Arabia, where they arrived from their homeland Circassia after the Circassian genocide. There is no official source on their population, but numerous sources state between 15,000-25,000. They are predominantly Muslim.

== History ==
=== First wave of arrivals (1864-1880s) ===
During the Circassian genocide, at least 500,000 Circassians were exiled into Ottoman territory. Circassians who were exiled to Ottoman lands initially suffered heavy tolls. The Circassians were initially housed in schools and mosques or had to live in caves until their resettlement. The Ottoman authorities assigned lands for Circassian settlers close to regular water sources and grain fields. Numerous died in transit to their new homes from disease and poor conditions. When the Circassians settled in Arab majority lands, the Bedouin Arabs viewed them very negatively. The mutual hostility between the Circassians and their Arab neighbors led to many clashes. Despite the superiority of Bedouin arms and mobility, the Circassians maintained their positions and population.

=== Second wave of arrivals (2011-2021) ===
In 2011, unrest in Syria grew out of discontent with the Syrian government and escalated to an armed conflict. Circassians in Syria were heavily affected and some fled to Saudi Arabia, which created the second "Circassian wave" in the region.
