= Abu Hamamah =

Abu Hamamah أبو همامة
- Village
- Location in Syria
- Coordinates: 34°57′9″N 36°52′27″E
- Country: Syria
- Governorate: Homs
- District: Rastan
- Subdistrict: Rastan

Population (2004)
  - Total: 255
- Time zone: UTC+3 (EET)
  - Summer (DST): UTC+2 (EEST)

Abu Hamamah (Arabic: أبو همامة, also known as Abu Humama) is a village in northern Syria, administratively part of the Rastan District, located north of Homs on the southern banks of the Orontes River. According to the Syria Central Bureau of Statistics (CBS), Abu Hamamah had a population of 255 in the 2004 census. Its inhabitants are predominantly Circassians from the Shapsugh tribe.
