= Mouhammad Alammar =

Syrian physician, preacher, and writer

Dr Mouhammad Alammar (Arabic: محمد العمار) is a leading nonviolence advocate, physician, Muslim preacher, writer and Syrian opposition figure.

== Biography ==
Born in the village of Namar in Daraa Governorate on February 2, 1962, Dr Mouhammad Alammar is a practicing physician with an MD degree from Tishreen University, Syria. He served as a volunteer in Namar's Omar Ibn Alkhatab mosque, giving sermons there for five years, 1993 to 1998. He also has lectured at cultural centers and in conferences inside Syria and abroad.

He describes himself as “a Syrian physician accused of an interest in philosophy, history, religion, and humanism; an intellectual who feels a responsibility to make his world a more enlightened and a better place, drawn toward the achievements and discoveries of mankind in nature, psychology, and sociology.”

He is a signatory to The Damascus Declaration.

He is a member of the National Coordination Committee for Democratic Change.

Dr Alammar was detained twice by Syrian Military Intelligence in 2011 and was detained again on 20 March 2012, he is currently in prison.
