= Shishani =

Shishani (Chechen: Шишани; Arabic: شيشاني, lit. 'Chechen') is a common family name among the Chechen diaspora in the Arab world.

- Muhammed Bashir Ismail ash-Shishani, Jordanian statesman and major general
- Mohammad Omar Shishani (born 1989), Jordanian football player
- Abu Omar al-Shishani, Georgian militant, member of the Islamic State
