= Circassians in Turkey =

Branch of the Circassian diaspora in Turkey

Тыркуем ис Адыгэхэр Türkiye Çerkesleri
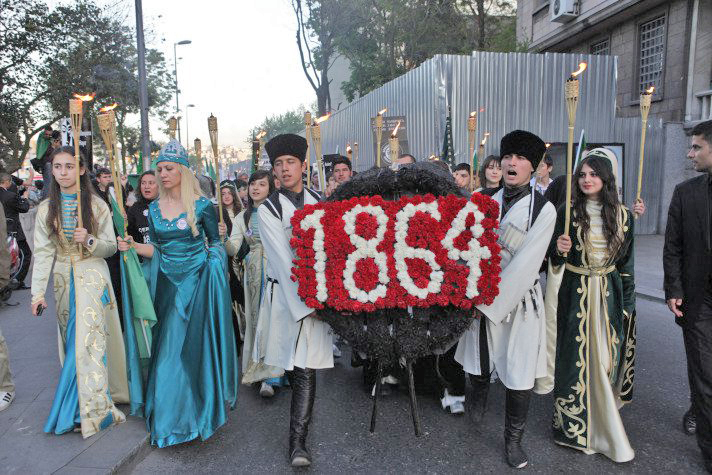
- Circassians marching to commemorate the Circassian genocide in Taksim Square, Istanbul

Total population
- Estimated 2,000,000–3,000,000

Regions with significant populations
- Marmara Region; Central Anatolia Region; Black Sea Region; in: Kayseri; Kırklareli; Eskişehir; Samsun; Sinop; Çanakkale; Kahramanmaraş; Tokat; Afyonkarahisar; Balıkesir; Sakarya; Bolu; Aydın; Bursa; Bilecik; Sivas; Amasya; Çorum; Istanbul and others

Languages
- East Circassian; West Circassian; Turkish; Arabic (in Antakya and Reyhanlı)

Religion
- Sunni Islam

Related ethnic groups
- Abazins, Abkhazians, Chechens

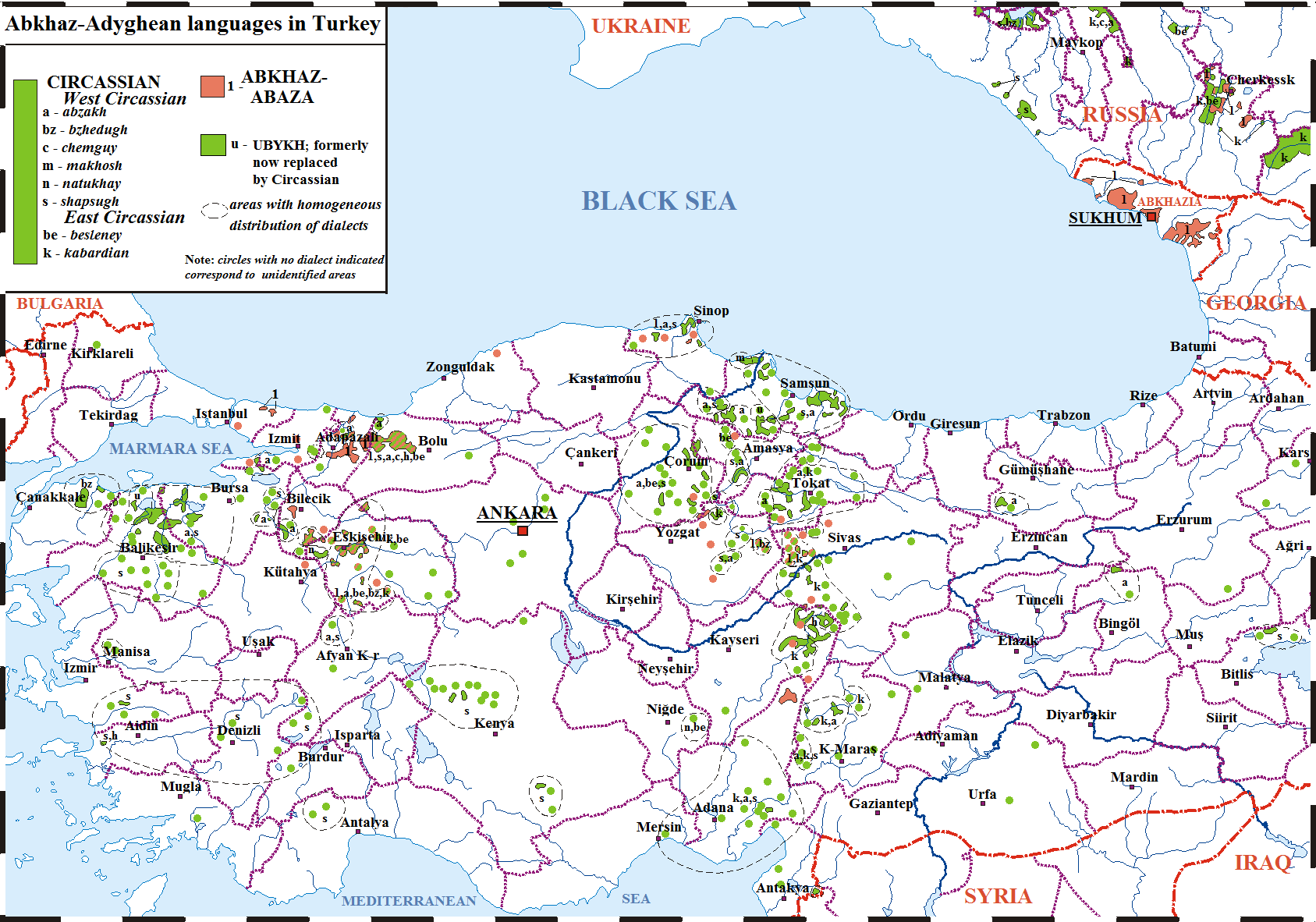
The distribution of Circassians in Turkey

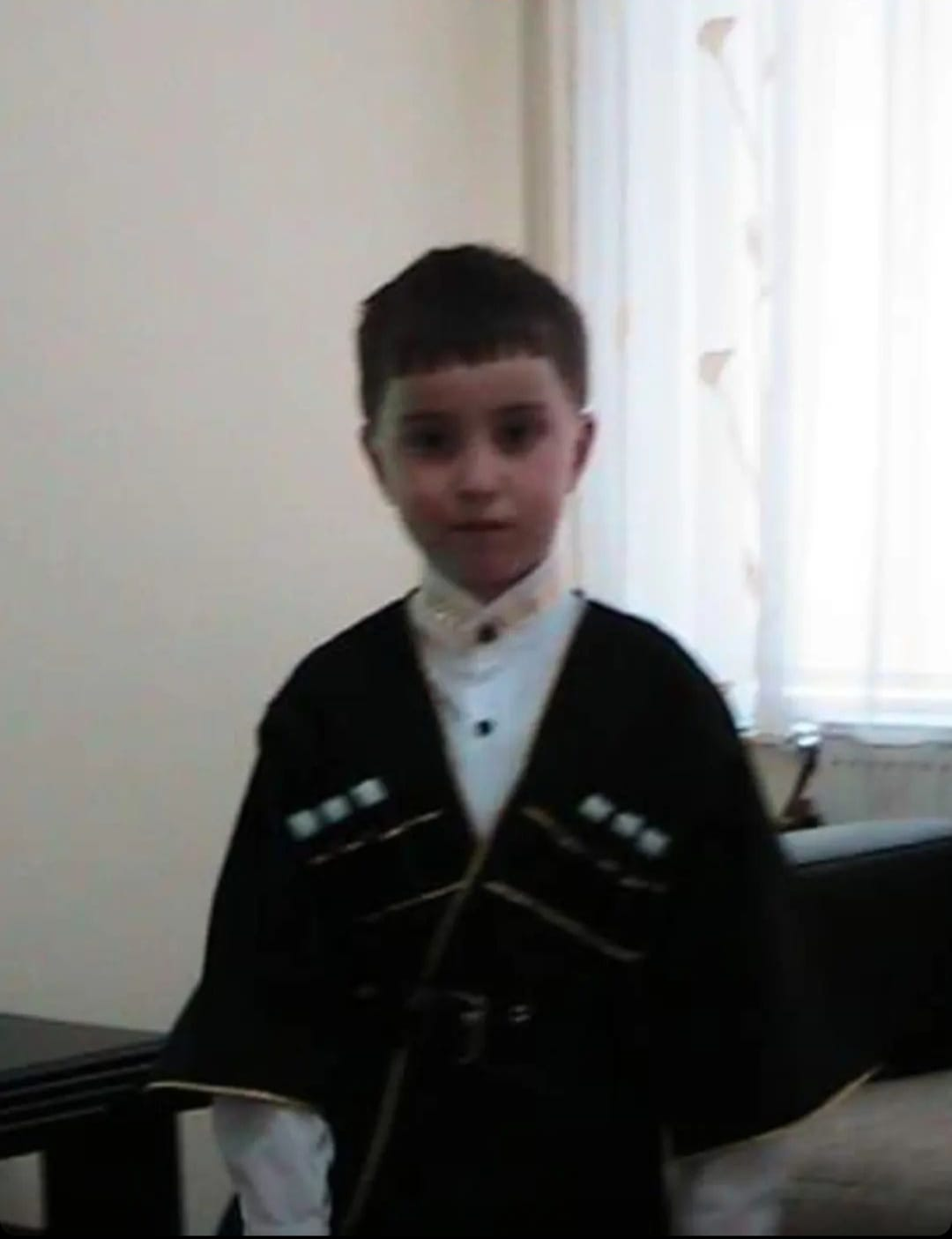
Circassian boy in Turkey wearing the North Caucasian traditional dress Chokha

Circassians in Turkey (Note: Kabardian and Adyghe: Тыркуем ис Адыгэхэр, romanized: Tyrkuiem is Adygekher; Turkish: Türkiye Çerkesleri) refers to people born in or residing in Turkey that are of Circassian origin. The Circassians are one of the largest ethnic minorities in Turkey, with a population estimated to be two million, or according to the EU reports, three.

Circassians are a Caucasian people, and although the Circassians in Turkey were assimilated to some degree, a portion of the diaspora still speaks their native Circassian languages as it is still spoken in many Circassian villages, and the group that preserved their language the best are the Kabardians. With the rise of Circassian nationalism in the 21st century, Circassians in Turkey, especially the young, have started to study and learn their language. The Circassians in Turkey mostly identify as Muslim. The largest association of Circassians in Turkey, KAFFED, was the founding member of the International Circassian Association (ICA), until it left in 2022 due to "ICA acting as a Russian puppet organisation".

The closely related ethnic groups Abazins (10,000) and Abkhazians (39,000) are also often counted among them. The term "Circassian" was formerly used in the Ottoman Empire in the late 1800s to refer to all North Caucasians.

== History ==
=== Ottoman Empire ===
Circassians in the Ottoman Empire mainly kept to themselves and maintained their separate identity, even having their own courts, in which they would tolerate no outside influence, and various travelers noted that they never forgot their homeland, for which they continually yearned.

After the Circassian genocide, Circassians who were exiled to Ottoman lands initially suffered heavy tolls. The Circassians were initially housed in schools and mosques or had to live in caves until their resettlement. The Ottoman authorities assigned lands for Circassian settlers close to regular water sources and grain fields. Numerous died in transit to their new homes from disease and poor conditions.

In Romania, the Circassians were granted privileges by the Ottoman authorities because of their Muslim religion and would frequently enter in conflict with the Christian population of the region. They would give parts of their gains to the Ottoman authorities. Palace of the Pasha (now the Tulcea Art Museum) and the Azizyie Mosque of Tulcea were built with funds coming from Circassians.

In Bulgaria, one of the major spots of arrival for the Circassians, the lives of Circassians were not easy, as diseases spread. Many families completely disappeared within a few years. Around 80,000 Circassians lived in "death camps" on the outskirts of Varna, where they were deprived of food and subjected to diseases. As a result, both the Muslim and Christian population of Vidin volunteered to support the Circassian settlers by increasing grain production for them. The Circassians were seen as a "Muslim threat" and expelled from Bulgaria and other parts of the Balkans by Russian armies following the end of the Russo-Turkish war. They were not allowed to return, so the Ottoman authorities settled them in new other lands such as in modern Jordan, Israel, Palestine, Syria and Turkey.

In Jordan, the Bedouin Arabs viewed the Circassians very negatively. The Circassians refused to pay the khuwwa ("protection" fees), and the Bedouin declared that it was halal (allowed) to murder Circassians on sight. The mutual hostility between the Circassians and their nomadic and settled Arab neighbors led to many clashes. Despite the superiority of Bedouin arms and mobility, the Circassians maintained their positions and population. Later, Circassians in Jordan marked the founding of modern Amman.

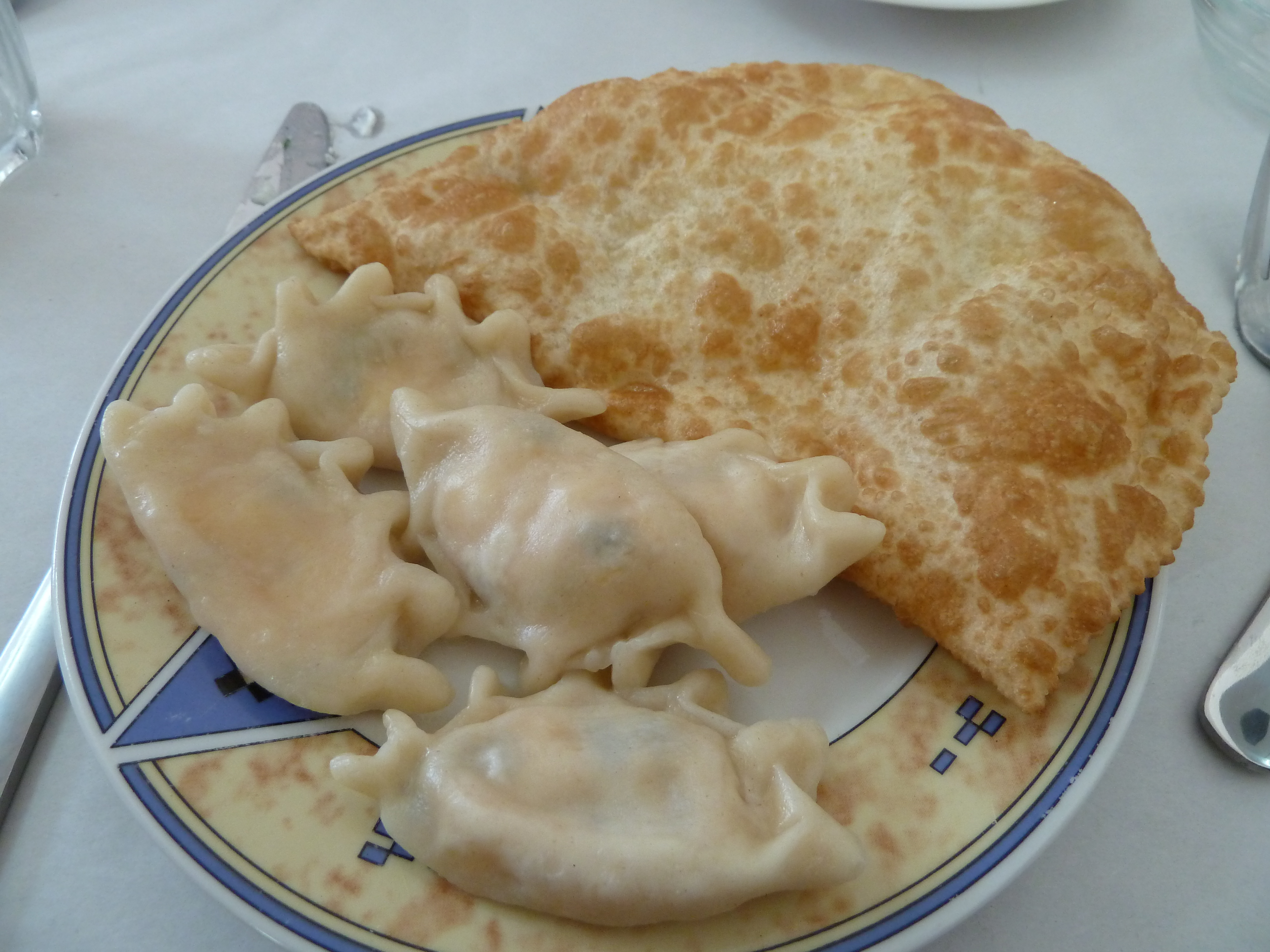
Traditional Circassian dishes

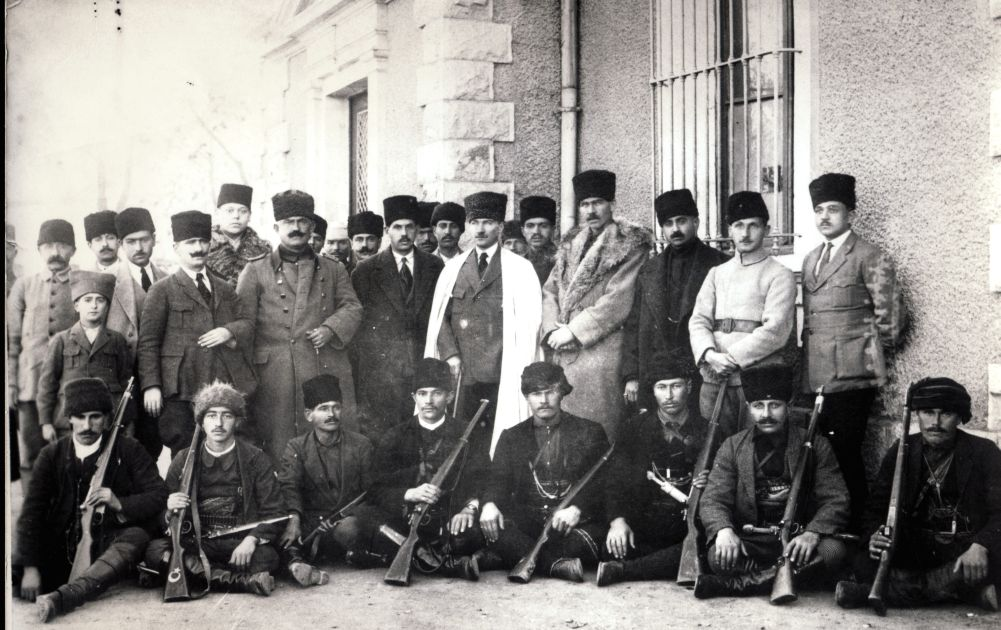
Ethem the Circassian, his Circassian hands and Mustafa Kemal Atatürk in front of the main building of the station, who were on their way to the Yozgat rebellion (June 1920)

In Palestine, the Circassian exiles established the towns of al-Rihaniyya and Kafr Kama. The Bedouin Arabs viewed them as "squatters". Circassian culture occasionally clashed with Arab culture, with local Arabs looking with horror upon the equality of men and women in Circassian culture. In various areas of the wider Levant region armed conflict broke out between Circassians and other local groups, especially Bedouin and Druze, with little or no Ottoman intervention; some of these feuds continued as late as the mid-20th century.

In Syria, just like in Jordan and Palestine, clashes occurred between the Circassian exiles and the Bedouin. They were, however, less fierce compared to the other regions and slowly cooled down. Also, the Circassians which lived in the Ottoman Empire spoke a Tartar dialect like language, which they write with Arabic characters.

=== Ottoman Circassian renaissance ===
Circassians are regarded by historians to play a key role in the history of Turkey. Circassians took active role in the Ottoman state in high positions from their arrival until the collapse of the empire. A large portion of influential entities, such as the Ottoman Special Organization, Hamidiye regiments, and the Committee of Union of Progress were made up by Circassians. Key figures include Eşref Kuşçubaşı and Mehmed Reşid. Circassians in the Ottoman lands embraced their Caucasian identity, while also maintaining a primary Ottoman-Muslim identity. After the 1908 Revolution in the Ottoman Empire, Circassian nationalist activities started. Organizations such as the Çerkes İttihat ve Teavün Cemiyeti (Circassian Union and Mutual Aid Society) and Çerkes Kadınları Teavün Cemiyeti (Circassian Women's Mutual Aid Society) published journals in the Circassian language and opened Circassian-only schools. Some were less cultural and more political, such as the Şimalî Kafkas Cemiyeti (North Caucasian Society) and the Kafkas İstiklâl Komitesi (Committee for the Liberation of Caucasus), both of which aimed for the independence of Circassia and were supported by the CUP.

=== Cooperation with Greece during the Greco-Turkish War (1919–1922) ===
During the Greco-Turkish War of 1919-1922, many Circassians cooperated with Greece. Thousands or tens of thousands of Circassians volunteered to join the Greek Army, while notable individuals such as ended up siding siding with Greece against the Turkish National Movement. A Circassian nationalist organization was also formed during that period, seeking a joint Greek–Circassian protectorate in the South Marmara. Many Circassians were later deported to either Greece or eastern Anatolia, notwithstanding whether they cooperated with Greece or not.

== Assimilation of Turkey's Circassians ==
Turkey has the largest Circassian population in the world, around half of all Circassians live in Turkey, mainly in the provinces of Samsun and Ordu (in Northern Turkey), Kahramanmaraş (in Southern Turkey), Kayseri (in Central Turkey), Bandırma, and Düzce (in Northwest Turkey), along the shores of the Black Sea; the region near the city of Ankara. All citizens of Turkey are considered Turks by the government, but it is estimated that approximately two million ethnic Circassians live in Turkey. The "Circassians" in question do not always speak the languages of their ancestors, and in some cases some of them may describe themselves as "only Turkish". The reason for this loss of identity is mostly due to natural assimilation, but also due to Turkey's government assimilation policies and marriages with non–Circassians.

Especially after the 1940s, Circassians were restricted by policies such as ostracization of the Circassian language in public, Turkification of village names, and the ban on Circassian surnames. Despite these policies, the Circassians remained loyal to the Turkish state.

In December 2021, Deutsche Welle's Turkish language documentary "The story of the Circassians from the Caucasus to Turkey" led to substantial discussions regarding the state of Circassian assimilation in Turkey. This gave rise to heavy xenophobia, racism and hate speech in Turkish media questioning loyalty of Circassians to the Turkish state and accusing Circassian NGOs of playing in foreign hands. Turkish ultranationalists were seen posting genocidal and racist quotes of Nihal Atsız.

According to Fahri Huvaj, a prominent Circassian nationalist, the Circassian population has gone through assimilation in the world and now approximately only one fifth of Circassians can speak their language and that the Circassian language and culture is about to disappear from Turkey. UNESCO reports state that Adyghe and Abkhazian are among the "severely endangered" languages in Turkey .

Most Circassian organizations, including KAFFED, the biggest one, confirmed Deutsche Welle's claims while still declaring loyalty to the state and calling for friendship between Circassians and Turks. However, some smaller local organizations like Çerkes Forumu denied the claims. Çerkes Forumu's statement read: "We are Circassians. There are no traitors among us. You can not turn us into traitors. Stop lying."

== Demographics ==
In the census of 1965, those who spoke Circassian as first language were proportionally most numerous in Kayseri (3.2%), Tokat (1.2%) and Kahramanmaraş (1.0%).

== Notable people ==
(* = Circassian descent only on paternal side)

(** = Circassian descent only on maternal side)

=== Politicians ===
- Ali Kemal** — Circassian–Turkish journalist who was killed during the Turkish War of Independence
- Deniz Baykal — Politician who was a long–time leader of the Republican People's Party
- Cem Özdemir* — Politician, co–chairman of the German Green Party
- Hüsamettin Özkan — Former minister and Vice Prime minister
- Nazım Ekren — Former minister of state
- Cahit Tutum — Politician and author

==== Presidents and prime ministers of Turkey ====
- Ahmet Necdet Sezer — 10th President of Turkey
- Fethi Okyar — Diplomat and politician, who also served as a military officer and diplomat during the last decade of the Ottoman Empire. He was also the second Prime Minister of Turkey (1924–1925) and the second Speaker of the Turkish Parliament after Mustafa Kemal Atatürk
- Recep Peker* — Military officer and politician. He served in various ministerial posts and finally as the Prime Minister of Turkey
- Necmettin Erbakan** — Politician, engineer, and academic who was the Prime Minister of Turkey from 1996 to 1997. He was pressured by the military to step down as prime minister and was later banned from politics by the Constitutional Court of Turkey for violating the separation of religion and state as mandated by the constitution.
- Nazım Ekren — Deputy Prime Minister of Turkey who was responsible for economic affairs

==== Sultans of the Ottoman Empire with Circassian mothers ====
- Abdul Hamid II** — 34th Sultan of the Ottoman Empire, the last Sultan to exert effective control over the fracturing state
- Mehmed V** — 35th and penultimate Ottoman Sultan
- Mehmed VI** — 36th and last Sultan of the Ottoman Empire

==== Grand viziers of the Ottoman Empire ====
- Abaza Siyavuş Pasha I — Ottoman-Abkhazian Grand Vizier (the index I is used to differentiate him from the second and better known Abaza Siyavuş Pasha, who also served as grand vizier, from 1687 to 1688)
- Abaza Siyavuş Pasha — Ottoman-Abkhazian Grand Vizier of the Ottoman Empire who held the post during one of the most chaotic periods of the empire
- Salih Hulusi Pasha — Ottoman-Abkhazian Grand Vizier of the Ottoman Empire, under the reign of the last Ottoman Sultan Mehmed VI
- Cenaze Hasan Pasha — Short–term Ottoman Grand Vizier in 1789. His epithet Cenaze (or Meyyit) means "corpse" because he was ill when appointed to the post.
- Melek Ahmed Pasa — Ottoman-Abkhazian statesman and grand vizier during the reign of Mehmed IV
- Ibşir Mustafa Pasha — Ottoman statesman and Grand Vizier of the Ottoman Empire from 28 October 1654 to 11 May 1655. He was also the Ottoman governor of Damascus Eyalet (province) in 1649. He was a damat ("bridegroom") to the Ottoman dynasty, as he married an Ottoman princess.
- Koca Dervish Mehmed Pasha — Ottoman military officer and statesman from Circassia. He was made Kapudan Pasha (Grand Admiral) in 1652 and promoted to Grand Vizier on 21 March 1653. He held the position until 28 October 1654.
- Çerkes Mehmed Pasha – Ottoman statesman who served as Grand Vizier of the Ottoman Empire from 1624 to 1625
- Hayreddin Pasha — Ottoman-Abkhazian politician. First serving as Beylerbeyi of Ottoman Tunisia, he later achieved the high post of Grand Vizier of the Ottoman Empire. He was a political reformer during a period of growing European ascendancy. was a pragmatic activist who reacted against poor conditions in Muslim states, and looked to Europe for solutions. He applied the Islamic concept of "maṣlaḥah" (or public interest), to economic issues. He emphasized the central role of justice and security in economic development. He was a major advocate of "tanẓīmāt" (or modernization) for Tunisia's political and economic systems.
- Koca Hüsrev Mehmed Pasha — Ottoman-Abkhazian admiral, reformer and statesman, who was Kapudan Pasha of the Ottoman Navy. He reached the position of Grand Vizier rather late in his career, between 2 July 1839 and 8 June 1840 during the reign of Abdulmejid I. However, during the 1820s, he occupied key administrative roles in the fight against regional warlords, the reformation of the army, and the reformation of Turkish attire. He was one of the main statesmen who predicted a war with the Russian Empire who exiled his ancestors, which would eventually be the case with the outbreak of the Crimean War.
- Özdemiroğlu Osman Pasha — Ottoman statesman and military commander who also held the office of Grand Vizier
- Mahmud Shevket Pasha — Ottoman generalissimo and statesman, who was an important political figure during the Second Constitutional Era

=== Military officers ===
- Çerkes Ethem — Militia leader who initially gained fame for gaining victories against the Allied powers invading Anatolia in the aftermath of World War I and afterwards during the Turkish War of Independence.
- Yakub Cemil — Revolutionary and soldier, who assassinated Nazım Pasha during the 1913 Ottoman coup d'état
- Ahmet Fevzi Big — Commander of the Ninth Army Corps of the Ottoman Third Army. He was an Abkhazian immigrant from Düzce
- Ahmet Anzavur — Ottoman officier who occupied the Marmara Region
- Bekir Sami Kunduh — First Minister of Foreign Affairs of Turkey during 1920–1921
- Cemil Cahit Toydemir — Officer of the Ottoman Army and a general of the Turkish Army
- Ali Sait Akbaytogan — General of the Turkish Army
- Cemal Madanoğlu
- Doğan Güreş
- Çetin Doğan
- Burhanettin Bigalı
- Aydoğan Babaoğlu
- İsmail Canbulat
- Mürsel Bakü

=== Cultural figures ===
- Tevfik Esenç — Last known fully competent speaker of the Ubykh language

=== Historians and writers ===
- Hasan Cemal** — Journalist, historian and writer

=== Film, TV, and stage ===
- Türkan Şoray — Actress
- Ali İhsan Varol — TV show presenter, producer, and actor
- Mehmet Oz** — Surgeon who hosts the Dr. Oz Show
- Elçin Sangu — Actress known for her role in Kiralık Aşk
- Damla Sönmez — Actress, best known for her roles in Bir Aşk Hikayesi, Güllerin Savaşı and Çukur
- Mehmet Aslantuğ — Actor, director, producer, and screenwriter. He has received a Golden Boll Award, a Golden Objective Award, three Golden Orange Awards, and four Golden Butterfly Awards
- Selda Alkor — Actress, beauty pageant titleholder, painter, and singer famous for her tall height, natural blonde hair, fair skin, and light green eyes
- Filiz Akın* — Actress, writer and TV presenter
- Sinemis Candemir — Model, actress
- Neslihan Atagül — Actress best known for her role in Kara Sevda (2015–2017), one of the most successful Turkish series, sold to more than 110 countries and the winner of the International Emmy Award in 2017
- Ufuk Özkan — Actor
- İrem Sak — Actress and singer
- Berkun Oya — Writer and director
- Ezel Akay — Film actor, film director and film producer
- Sezgi Sena Akay — Actress, former professional volleyball player, presenter, and model who was crowned Best Model of the World 2012
- Deniz Akkaya — Top model, presenter, fashion editor, disc jockey, entrepreneur, businesswoman and actress
- Kanbolat Görkem Arslan — Actor
- Günseli Başar — Beauty contestant and columnist who was crowned Miss Turkey 1951 and Miss Europe 1952
- Orhan Boran — Radio TV host and actor. He was also widely known for his laudable usage of the Turkish language
- Begüm Birgören — Actress
- Sanem Çelik — Actress, artist and dancer
- Sadi Celil Cengiz — Actor
- Meltem Cumbul — Actress
- Keriman Halis Ece — Beauty pageant titleholder, pianist, and fashion model who won the Miss Turkey 1932 title. She was also crowned Miss Universe 1932 in Spa, Belgium and thus became Turkey's first Miss Universe.

=== Musicians and painters ===
- Hadise — Singer
- Avni Arbaş — Painter
- Aydilge — Writer, poet and singer–songwriter
- Nuri Bilge Ceylan — Photographer, cinematographer, screenwriter and actor and film director best known for the Palme d'Or winning Winter Sleep

=== Sports people ===
- Ahmet Çakar — Sportscaster and a former football referee
- Altay Bayındır — Footballer
- Emre Belözoğlu — Football manager and player
- Şamil Çinaz — Footballer
- Can Bartu — Basketball and football player and pundit
- Ayetullah Bey — Footballer, founder and second president of the major Turkish multi–sport club Fenerbahçe SK
- Mahmut Atalay — Wrestler, 1956 Summer Olympics gold medallist
- Hamit Kaplan — Wrestler, 1956 Summer Olympics gold medallist
- Süleyman Seba — Ex–President of Besiktaş Football Club
- Yaşar Doğu — 1948 London Olympics middleweight wrestling champion
- Sefer Baygın — 1972 Europe wrestling champion
- Oğuz Çetin — Football manager and player
- Mesut Bakkal — Football manager and player
- Celal Atik — Wrestler and coach, 1948 Olympics gold medallist
- Fuat Balkan — fencer
- Sefer Baygın — Wrestler who won the 1972 European Wrestling Championships and competed in the 1972 Summer Olympics
- Gazanfer Bilge — Wrestler who won the gold medal in the Featherweight class of Men's Freestyle Wrestling at the 1948 Olympics
- Adil Candemir — Wrestler, medallist at the 1948 Summer Olympics

=== Other notable people ===
- Habil Bey, Circassian landowner who helped rescue 122 Greeks from Bafra in 1921 during the Pontic Greek genocide.

== See also ==
- Minorities in Turkey
- Circassians in Iran
- Circassians in Syria
- Circassians in Iraq
