= Bariqa =

Bariqa بريقة
- Village
- Buraykah
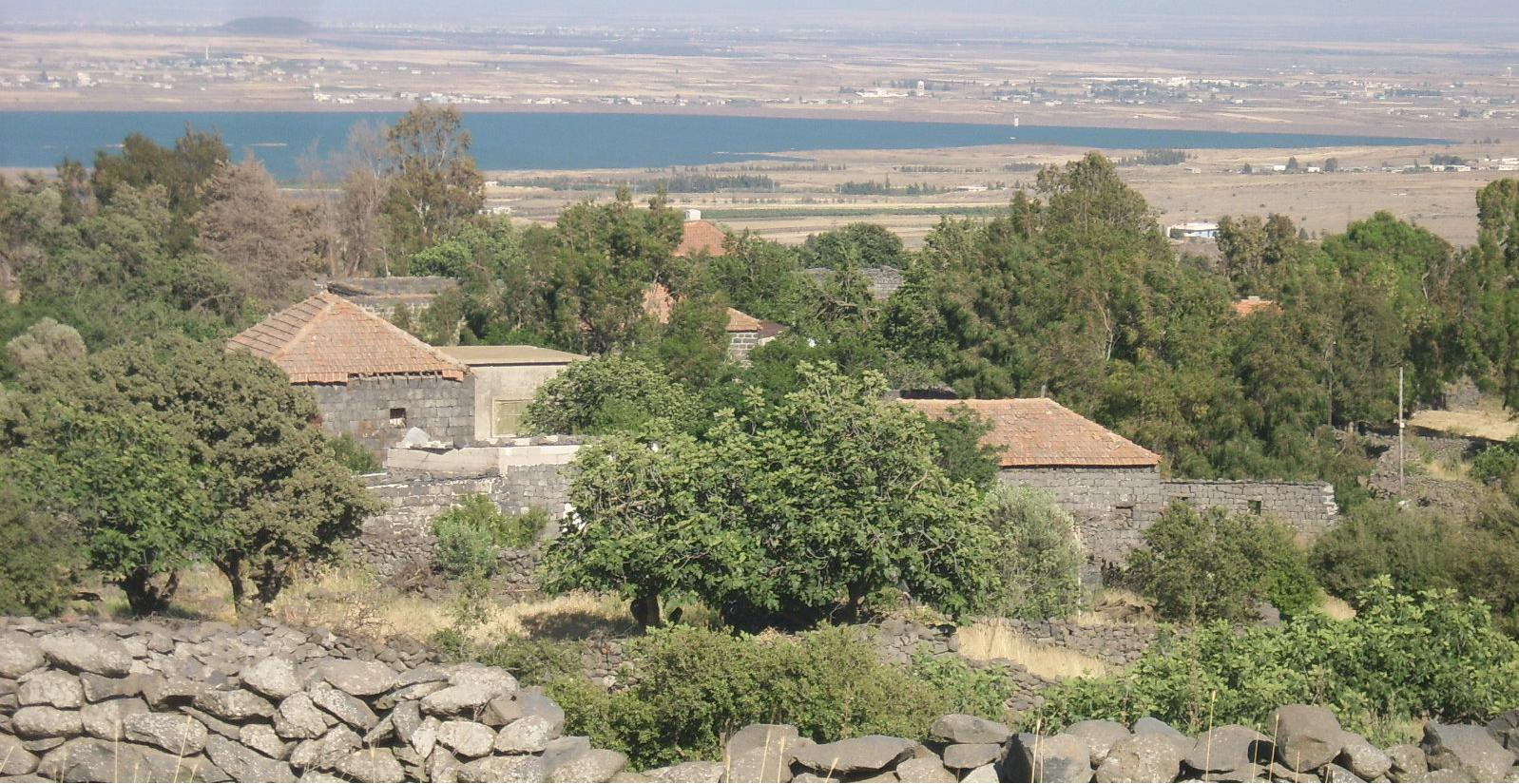
- View of Bariqa, 2007

- Location within the Golan Heights Location within Syria
- Coordinates: 33°02′35″N 35°52′16″E
- Country: Syria
- Governorate: Quneitra
- District: Quneitra
- Subdistrict: Quneitra

Population (2004)
  - Total: 371
  - Religions: Sunni Muslim
- Time zone: UTC+2 (EET)
  - Summer (DST): UTC+3 (EEST)
- Area code: 14

Bariqa (Arabic: بريقة, also spelled Buraykah, Bureiqa or Breikeh) is a Circassian village in southwestern Syria, administratively part of the Quneitra Governorate, south of Quneitra, in the Syrian-controlled portion of the Golan Heights. Nearby localities include Beer Ajam to the north, Naba' al-Sakhr to the northeast, al-Harra and Namer to the east, al-Suwaysah and Jasim to the southeast and al-Rafid to the south. According to the Syria Central Bureau of Statistics (CBS), Bariqa had a population of 371 in the 2004 census.

Its inhabitants are predominantly Circassians from the Abadzekh tribe, who profess Sunni Islam.

== History ==
The village is recorded as Berenikē (Βερενίκη) in the Diocletianic boundary stones corpus, dated to 284- 304 CE.

In the late 19th-century Bariqa was described as "one of the largest and best of the Circassian villages." It consisted of about 100 houses with 85 families, translating into an approximate population of 425, including 68 adult male fighters. Its streets were wide and clean, it abounded in heaps of hay and contained a well-built mosque. To the north of Bariqa was an icy-water spring and to the east was a pool which irrigated the village's crops. Bariqa served as the residence of the sheikh ("chief") of all the Circassian villages in the Golan Heights region.

Opposition rebels and Syrian Army soldiers clashed in Bariqa and nearby Beer Ajam in November 2012, during the ongoing Syrian civil war, which began in 2011. Fatalities on both sides totaled about 30, according to a monitoring group. The village was reported to be under rebel control by 13 November. On 26 July 2018, the Syrian army took back the town after the rebels surrendered and handed over their heavy and medium weapons to army.

== Bibliography ==
- Schumacher, Gottlieb (1888). The Jaulân: Surveyed for the German Society for the Exploration of the Holy Land. Bentley and Son. "Gottlieb Schumacher."
