= Beer Ajam =

Beer Ajam بئر عجم
- Village
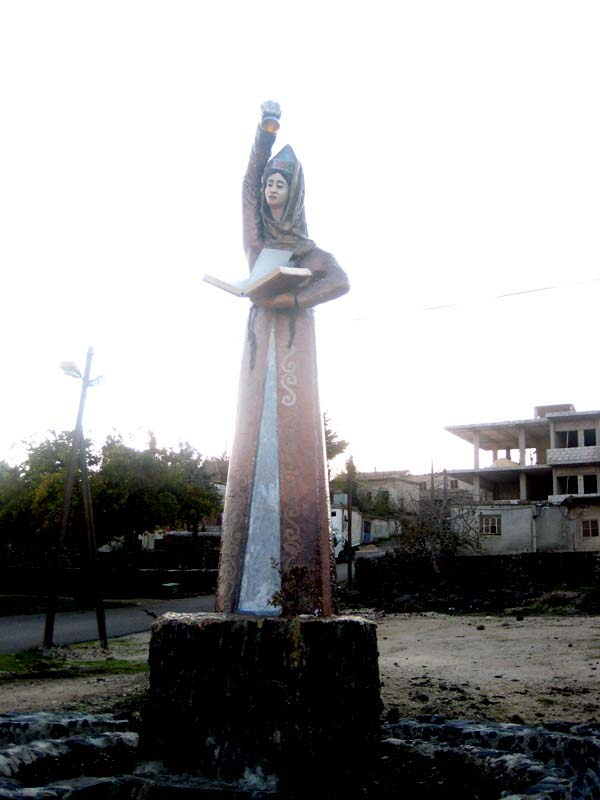
- Satanaya: Statue of knowledge

- Location within the Golan Heights Location within Syria
- Coordinates: 33°03′11.68″N 35°52′1.62″E
- PAL: 231/273
- Country: Syria
- Governorate: Quneitra
- District: Quneitra
- Subdistrict: Quneitra
- Settled: 1872
- Elevation: 942 m (3,091 ft)

Population (2004)
  - Total: 353
  - Religions: Sunni Muslim
- Time zone: UTC+2 (EET)
  - Summer (DST): UTC+3 (EEST)
- Postal code: C6267
- Area code: 14

Beer Ajam (Arabic: بئر عجم, romanized: Biʾr ʿAjam, lit. 'Non-Arabs' Spring', also spelled Bir Ajam) is a Syrian Circassian village in the Quneitra Governorate in the Golan Heights. It has been inhabited for about 150 years. Its first houses were built in 1872. Nearby localities include Quneitra to the north, Naba al-Sakhr to the northeast, al-Harra to the east, Namer to the southeast and Bariqa to the south. According to the Syria Central Bureau of Statistics (CBS), Beer Ajam had a population of 353 in the 2004 census. Its inhabitants are Circassians from the Abadzekh and Kebertei tribes.

== History ==
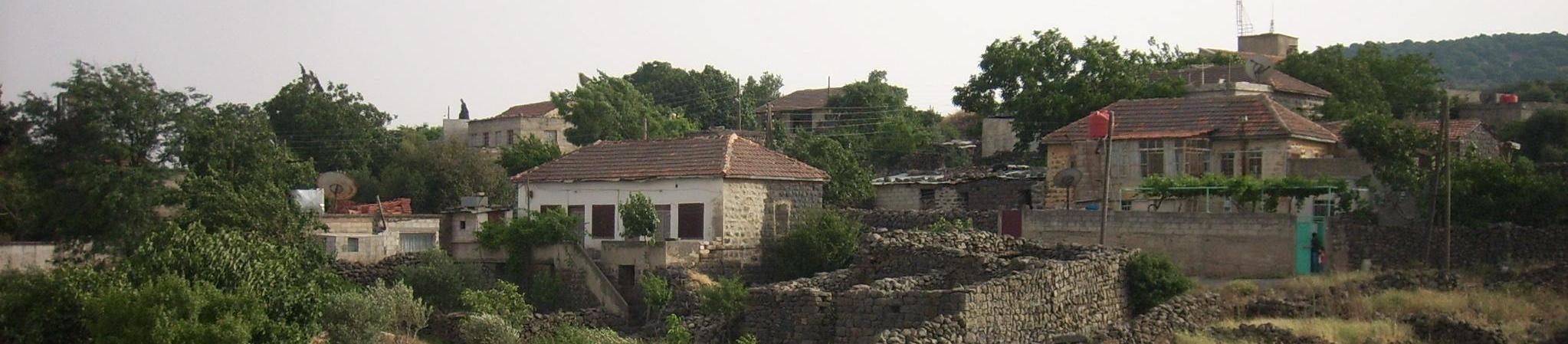
The old village

In the late 19th-century Beer Ajam was described as a large and prosperous Circassian village with 80 hut-like houses and a total population of 340. It was built in separate parts, with springs to the north and next to a pond to the south. The village also housed one mosque.

=== Displacement and reconstruction ===
The village was abandoned for almost 10 years after the occupation of the Golan Heights by Israel during the 1967 Six-Day War. The part of the Golan in which the village is located was returned to Syria as part of the 1974 Israeli disengagement from that area, although its inhabitants did not actually return until the late 1970s.

The government completed construction of new houses in the northern part of the village in 1986 to encourage the population to return. However, half of those houses are still unoccupied. The reconstruction also included another group of villages in the area.

=== Syrian civil war ===
On 4 November 2012, the Israeli Army claimed three Syrian Army tanks entered Beer Ajam in an operation against anti-government rebels trying to overthrow the Syrian government of Bashar al-Assad as part of the ongoing Syrian civil war. Israel filed a formal complaint with United Nations peacekeeping forces maintaining the Israeli-Syrian truce in the Golan Heights area. The alleged operation would be the first military presence in Beer Ajam since 1973. The village was captured by rebel forces by 13 November after clashes with the Army. On 26 July 2018, the Syrian Army recaptured the town after rebels surrendered and handed over their heavy and medium weapons to the Army.

== Demographics ==
The permanent residents in the village are around 400 Circassians. They are estimated to be only the quarter of what they should be, the rest preferring to stay in the capital or the Diaspora. The gender make up is 55% male and 45% female. About 40% of the population has access to a computer. The average monthly income of a family is about €300 (figures lacked precision).

In summer, tourist activity rises significantly, and as a result the population can double or even triple. Many visitors are relatives that come from other villages in the area, including villages in the Israeli-controlled area of the Golan Heights. More real estate development has taken place recently, and many new business opportunities have been created.

By May 2018, none of the pre-war residents were still living in the settlement, which was by that point home to roughly 4,000 to 4,300 IDPs.

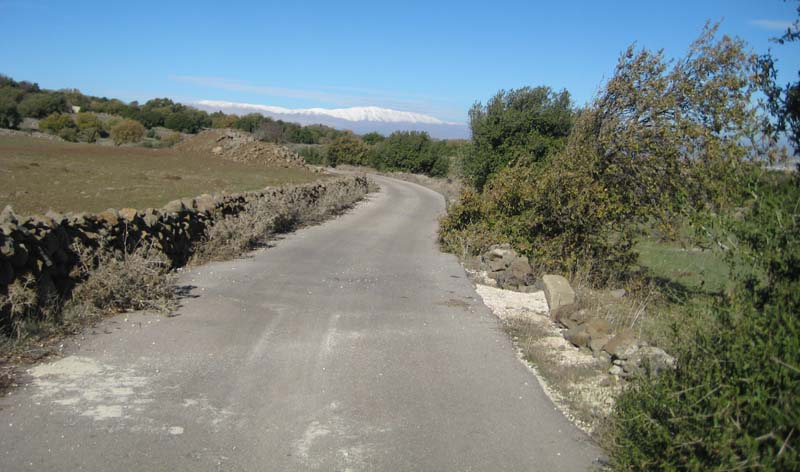
Landscape with Mount Hermon on the horizon

== Nature and wildlife ==
The climate is moderate in the summer, and cold in the winter. The village is surrounded by forests, where oak, Butm, Azaapop, wild peach, and pear trees abound. Wild animals include the fox and jackal, wild pig, wild Gharbra and others, in addition to several types of birds, including the Album, Hoopoe, local swallow, league, and Arur. Animal diversity has been subject to a steady decline, which threatens to eliminate local wildlife completely. There are no clear reasons for this, but it is believed that the decline in area covered by vegetation in addition to the expansion of human activity and the opening of more roads contribute greatly.

== Agriculture and livestock production ==
Agriculture focused on olive trees, grapes, figs, almonds and lei, the animal production depends on cows, which constitute the source of income for many families. Poultry, sheep, in addition to widespread beekeeping.

== Notable people ==
- Bassam Abdel Majeed - Syrian military officer, politician and diplomat
- Jawdat Said - Islamic scholar

== Bibliography ==
- Schumacher, Gottlieb (1888). The Jaulân: Surveyed for the German Society for the Exploration of the Holy Land. Bentley and Son.
