= Maysky (inhabited locality) =

Maysky (Russian: Ма́йский; masculine), Mayskaya (Ма́йская; feminine), or Mayskoye (Ма́йское; neuter) is the name of several inhabited localities in Russia.

== Modern localities ==
=== Republic of Adygea ===
As of 2010, one rural locality in the Republic of Adygea bears this name:

- Maysky, Republic of Adygea, a settlement in Koshekhablsky District

=== Altai Krai ===
As of 2010, two rural localities in Altai Krai bear this name:

- Maysky, Rebrikhinsky District, Altai Krai, a settlement in Ziminsky Selsoviet of Rebrikhinsky District
- Maysky, Romanovsky District, Altai Krai, a settlement in Maysky Selsoviet of Romanovsky District

=== Amur Oblast ===
As of 2010, one rural locality in Amur Oblast bears this name:

- Maysky, Amur Oblast, a settlement in Maysky Rural Settlement of Mazanovsky District

=== Republic of Bashkortostan ===
As of 2010, two rural localities in the Republic of Bashkortostan bear this name:

- Maysky, Republic of Bashkortostan, a selo in Maysky Selsoviet of Iglinsky District
- Mayskoye, Republic of Bashkortostan, a village in Verkhnetroitsky Selsoviet of Tuymazinsky District

=== Belgorod Oblast ===
As of 2010, two rural localities in Belgorod Oblast bear this name:

- Maysky, Belgorod Oblast, a settlement in Belgorodsky District
- Mayskoye, Belgorod Oblast, a selo in Selivanovsky Rural Okrug of Valuysky District

=== Bryansk Oblast ===
As of 2010, four rural localities in Bryansk Oblast bear this name:

- Maysky, Komarichsky District, Bryansk Oblast, a settlement in Kokinsky Selsoviet of Komarichsky District
- Maysky, Pochepsky District, Bryansk Oblast, a settlement in Titovsky Selsoviet of Pochepsky District
- Maysky, Pogarsky District, Bryansk Oblast, a settlement in Grinevsky Selsoviet of Pogarsky District
- Maysky, Surazhsky District, Bryansk Oblast, a settlement in Dalisichsky Selsoviet of Surazhsky District

=== Republic of Buryatia ===
As of 2010, one rural locality in the Republic of Buryatia bears this name:

- Maysky, Republic of Buryatia, a settlement in Maysky Selsoviet of Kurumkansky District

=== Chechen Republic ===
As of 2010, one rural locality in the Chechen Republic bears this name:

- Maysky, Chechen Republic, a settlement in Groznensky District

=== Irkutsk Oblast ===
As of 2010, three rural localities in Irkutsk Oblast bear this name:

- Maysky, Kuytunsky District, Irkutsk Oblast, a settlement in Kuytunsky District
- Maysky, Nizhneudinsky District, Irkutsk Oblast, a settlement in Nizhneudinsky District
- Mayskaya, a village in Osinsky District

=== Kabardino-Balkar Republic ===
As of 2010, one urban locality in the Kabardino-Balkar Republic bears this name:

- Maysky, Kabardino-Balkar Republic, a town in Maysky District

=== Kaliningrad Oblast ===
As of 2010, five rural localities in Kaliningrad Oblast bear this name:

- Maysky, Kaliningrad Oblast, a settlement in Krasnotorovsky Rural Okrug of Zelenogradsky District
- Mayskoye, Bagrationovsky District, Kaliningrad Oblast, a settlement in Nivensky Rural Okrug of Bagrationovsky District
- Mayskoye, Gusevsky District, Kaliningrad Oblast, a settlement in Kubanovsky Rural Okrug of Gusevsky District
- Mayskoye, Polessky District, Kaliningrad Oblast, a settlement in Turgenevsky Rural Okrug of Polessky District
- Mayskoye, Slavsky District, Kaliningrad Oblast, a settlement under the administrative jurisdiction of Slavsk Town of District Significance of Slavsky District

=== Republic of Kalmykia ===
As of 2010, one rural locality in the Republic of Kalmykia bears this name:

- Maysky, Republic of Kalmykia, a settlement in Tselinnaya Rural Administration of Tselinny District

=== Kamchatka Krai ===
As of 2010, one rural locality in Kamchatka Krai bears this name:

- Mayskoye, Kamchatka Krai, a selo in Ust-Kamchatsky District

=== Karachay–Cherkess Republic ===
As of 2010, one rural locality in the Karachay–Cherkess Republic bears this name:

- Maysky, Karachay–Cherkess Republic, a settlement in Prikubansky District

=== Kemerovo Oblast ===
As of 2010, three rural localities in Kemerovo Oblast bear this name:

- Maysky, Novokuznetsky District, Kemerovo Oblast, a settlement in Kuzbasskaya Rural Territory of Novokuznetsky District
- Maysky, Bezlesnaya Rural Territory, Yashkinsky District, Kemerovo Oblast, a settlement in Bezlesnaya Rural Territory of Yashkinsky District
- Maysky, Kitatskaya Rural Territory, Yashkinsky District, Kemerovo Oblast, a settlement in Kitatskaya Rural Territory of Yashkinsky District

=== Khabarovsk Krai ===
As of 2010, one urban locality in Khabarovsk Krai bears this name:

- Maysky, Khabarovsk Krai, a work settlement in Sovetsko-Gavansky District

=== Republic of Khakassia ===
As of 2010, one rural locality in the Republic of Khakassia bears this name:

- Maysky, Republic of Khakassia, a settlement in Charkovsky Selsoviet of Ust-Abakansky District

=== Kirov Oblast ===
As of 2010, two rural localities in Kirov Oblast bear this name:

- Maysky, Orichevsky District, Kirov Oblast, a settlement in Orichevsky Rural Okrug of Orichevsky District
- Maysky, Yaransky District, Kirov Oblast, a settlement in Kugushergsky Rural Okrug of Yaransky District

=== Krasnodar Krai ===
As of 2010, two rural localities in Krasnodar Krai bear this name:

- Maysky, Kushchevsky District, Krasnodar Krai, a khutor in Srednechuburksky Rural Okrug of Kushchyovsky District
- Maysky, Tuapsinsky District, Krasnodar Krai, a settlement in Agoysky Rural Okrug of Tuapsinsky District

=== Krasnoyarsk Krai ===
As of 2010, three rural localities in Krasnoyarsk Krai bear this name:

- Maysky, Idrinsky District, Krasnoyarsk Krai, a settlement in Dobromyslovsky Selsoviet of Idrinsky District
- Maysky, Shushensky District, Krasnoyarsk Krai, a settlement in Subbotinsky Selsoviet of Shushensky District
- Mayskoye, Krasnoyarsk Krai, a settlement in Maysky Selsoviet of Yeniseysky District

=== Kurgan Oblast ===
As of 2010, one rural locality in Kurgan Oblast bears this name:

- Maysky, Kurgan Oblast, a settlement in Maysky Selsoviet of Kargapolsky District

=== Kursk Oblast ===
As of 2010, one rural locality in Kursk Oblast bears this name:

- Maysky, Kursk Oblast, a khutor in Bolshezhirovsky Selsoviet of Fatezhsky District

=== Mari El Republic ===
As of 2010, two rural localities in the Mari El Republic bear this name:

- Maysky, Gornomariysky District, Mari El Republic, a vyselok in Vilovatovsky Rural Okrug of Gornomariysky District
- Maysky, Kilemarsky District, Mari El Republic, a settlement in Kumyinsky Rural Okrug of Kilemarsky District

=== Republic of Mordovia ===
As of 2010, one rural locality in the Republic of Mordovia bears this name:

- Maysky, Republic of Mordovia, a settlement in Surgodsky Selsoviet of Torbeyevsky District

=== Republic of North Ossetia–Alania ===
As of 2010, one rural locality in the Republic of North Ossetia–Alania bears this name:

- Mayskoye, Republic of North Ossetia–Alania, a selo in Maysky Rural Okrug of Prigorodny District

=== Novosibirsk Oblast ===
As of 2010, four rural localities in Novosibirsk Oblast bear this name:

- Maysky, Cherepanovsky District, Novosibirsk Oblast, a settlement in Cherepanovsky District
- Maysky, Kochenyovsky District, Novosibirsk Oblast, a settlement in Kochenyovsky District
- Maysky, Moshkovsky District, Novosibirsk Oblast, a settlement in Moshkovsky District
- Mayskoye, Novosibirsk Oblast, a selo in Krasnozyorsky District

=== Omsk Oblast ===
As of 2010, one rural locality in Omsk Oblast bears this name:

- Maysky, Omsk Oblast, a settlement in Zvezdinsky Rural Okrug of Moskalensky District

=== Orenburg Oblast ===
As of 2010, five rural localities in Orenburg Oblast bear this name:

- Maysky, Adamovsky District, Orenburg Oblast, a settlement in Maysky Selsoviet of Adamovsky District
- Maysky, Alexandrovsky District, Orenburg Oblast, a settlement in Sultakayevsky Selsoviet of Alexandrovsky District
- Maysky, Krasnogvardeysky District, Orenburg Oblast, a settlement in Yashkinsky Selsoviet of Krasnogvardeysky District
- Maysky, Kvarkensky District, Orenburg Oblast, a settlement in Kvarkensky Selsoviet of Kvarkensky District
- Mayskoye, Orenburg Oblast, a selo in Blagodarnovsky Selsoviet of Tashlinsky District

=== Penza Oblast ===
As of 2010, two rural localities in Penza Oblast bear this name:

- Maysky, Penza Oblast, a settlement in Kirovsky Selsoviet of Serdobsky District
- Mayskoye, Penza Oblast, a selo in Maysky Selsoviet of Maloserdobinsky District

=== Perm Krai ===
As of 2010, one rural locality in Perm Krai bears this name:

- Maysky, Perm Krai, a settlement under the administrative jurisdiction of the city of krai significance of Krasnokamsk

=== Primorsky Krai ===
As of 2010, two rural localities in Primorsky Krai bear this name:

- Mayskoye, Chernigovsky District, Primorsky Krai, a selo in Chernigovsky District
- Mayskoye, Khankaysky District, Primorsky Krai, a selo in Khankaysky District

=== Rostov Oblast ===
As of 2010, one rural locality in Rostov Oblast bears this name:

- Maysky, Rostov Oblast, a khutor in Kirovskoye Rural Settlement of Tselinsky District

=== Sakhalin Oblast ===
As of 2010, one rural locality in Sakhalin Oblast bears this name:

- Mayskoye, Sakhalin Oblast, a selo in Poronaysky District

=== Samara Oblast ===
As of 2010, one rural locality in Samara Oblast bears this name:

- Mayskoye, Samara Oblast, a selo in Pestravsky District

=== Smolensk Oblast ===
As of 2010, one rural locality in Smolensk Oblast bears this name:

- Mayskoye, Smolensk Oblast, a village in Alexandrovskoye Rural Settlement of Monastyrshchinsky District

=== Tomsk Oblast ===
As of 2010, one rural locality in Tomsk Oblast bears this name:

- Maysky, Tomsk Oblast, a settlement in Pervomaysky District

=== Tula Oblast ===
As of 2010, six rural localities in Tula Oblast bear this name:

- Maysky, Chernsky District, Tula Oblast, a settlement in Fedorovskaya Rural Administration of Chernsky District
- Maysky, Golovenkovskaya Rural Administration, Shchyokinsky District, Tula Oblast, a settlement in Golovenkovskaya Rural Administration of Shchyokinsky District
- Maysky, Zhitovskaya Rural Administration, Shchyokinsky District, Tula Oblast, a settlement in Zhitovskaya Rural Administration of Shchyokinsky District
- Maysky, Uzlovsky District, Tula Oblast, a settlement in Mayskaya Rural Administration of Uzlovsky District
- Mayskoye, Kireyevsky District, Tula Oblast, a selo in Bogucharovsky Rural Okrug of Kireyevsky District
- Mayskoye, Kurkinsky District, Tula Oblast, a village in Ivanovskaya Volost of Kurkinsky District

=== Tver Oblast ===
As of 2010, one rural locality in Tver Oblast bears this name:

- Maysky, Tver Oblast, a khutor in Kuvshinovsky District

=== Tyumen Oblast ===
As of 2010, one rural locality in Tyumen Oblast bears this name:

- Maysky, Tyumen Oblast, a settlement in Maysky Rural Okrug of Abatsky District

=== Udmurt Republic ===
As of 2010, one rural locality in the Udmurt Republic bears this name:

- Maysky, Udmurt Republic, a pochinok in Shaberdinsky Selsoviet of Zavyalovsky District

=== Vladimir Oblast ===
As of 2010, one rural locality in Vladimir Oblast bears this name:

- Maysky, Vladimir Oblast, a settlement in Alexandrovsky District

=== Volgograd Oblast ===
As of 2010, two rural localities in Volgograd Oblast bear this name:

- Maysky, Volgograd, Volgograd Oblast, a settlement in Gornopolyansky Selsoviet of the city of oblast significance of Volgograd
- Maysky, Frolovsky District, Volgograd Oblast, a khutor in Archedinsky Selsoviet of Frolovsky District

=== Vologda Oblast ===
As of 2010, two rural localities in Vologda Oblast bear this name:

- Maysky, Gryazovetsky District, Vologda Oblast, a settlement in Lezhsky Selsoviet of Gryazovetsky District
- Maysky, Vologodsky District, Vologda Oblast, a settlement in Raboche-Krestyansky Selsoviet of Vologodsky District

=== Voronezh Oblast ===
As of 2010, one rural locality in Voronezh Oblast bears this name:

- Maysky, Voronezh Oblast, a settlement in Ivanovskoye Rural Settlement of Paninsky District

=== Yaroslavl Oblast ===
As of 2010, one rural locality in Yaroslavl Oblast bears this name:

- Maysky, Yaroslavl Oblast, a settlement in Nazarovsky Rural Okrug of Rybinsky District

== Historical localities ==
- Maysky, a former urban-type settlement in Rostov Oblast; since 2004—a part of the town of Shakhty
