= Shelkovnikov =

Shelkovnikov (masculine) or Shelkovnikova (feminine) may refer to:

- Alexander Begbutovich Shelkovnikov (1870–1933), Russian botanist
- Boris Shelkovnikov (1837–1878), Russian general
- Shelkovnikov (rural locality), a rural locality (a khutor) in Koshekhablsky District of the Republic of Adygea, Russia
