= Koshekhabl massacre =

- Part of the Russian Civil War
- Location: Koshekhabl, Kuban Soviet Republic (now Adygea, Russia)
- Date: 24–25 September 1918
- Target: Circassian civilians
- Attack type: Mass murder, looting, mass detention, rape, property destruction
- Deaths: 214–470
- Perpetrators: Red Army (Taman Division units under Kochergin, Belorechensk detachment, Kurganinsk Bolshevik detachment)

The Koshekhabl massacre (Note: (Adyghe: Тызщызэрапхъожьыгъэ мафэ; Kabardian: Дыщызэрапхъожа махуэ, lit. 'The day we were plundered')) occurred on 24–25 September 1918 when Red Army forces entered the village of Koshekhabl during the Russian Civil War. Red Army soldiers killed civilians, committed rape, looted property, destroyed homes, and detained local residents in the village mosque.

== Background ==
During the Russian Civil War, military operations took place across the North Caucasus. Following the destruction of several Circassian villages by Bolshevik forces in early 1918, local resistance expanded into a general uprising organized partly through Islamic clergy and Muslim community structures.

In early 1918, Cossacks from Kurganinsk requested assistance from Koshekhabl elders after Bolshevik forces looted and killed local residents. In response, local residents from Koshekhabl joined the 2nd Squadron of the Circassian Regiment under Staff Captain Shestakov, driving Bolshevik forces out of Kurganinsk and disarming a Red Army troop train at the local railway station. In March 1918, the Soviet Maykop Commissariat moved to disarm the Circassian population and contain armed resistance in the region. By September 1918, Red Army forces re-established control over the area, and Bolshevik detachments advanced toward Koshekhabl. During the Civil War, punitive measures affected both Circassian auls and Cossack stanitsas across the region, with Koshekhabl and Gabukay being among the most severely impacted Circassian settlements in the Adygea region.

During their retreat from the area in late September 1918, Bolshevik forces of the Mikhaylovskaya group destroyed the bridge at Koshekhabl before retreating toward Urupskaya. This allowed White Army forces to advance, and in early October 1918, the Circassian Cavalry Regiment and Line Regiment under Colonel Muravyov were ordered to join Baron Pyotr Wrangel's forces at Koshekhabl. Wrangel recorded in his memoirs that local Circassians, led by horse breeder Shovgenov, joined his brigade under a green flag. Wrangel noted that the Circassian auls experienced burning of villages, executions, and an incident where dozens of residents were buried alive by Bolshevik forces.

== Attack ==
On 24 September 1918, on the second day of the religious holiday Eid al-Adha, Red Army units from the Taman Division under commander Kochergin, alongside the Belorechensk and Kurganinsk Bolshevik detachments, entered Koshekhabl. Red Army artillery shelled the village from the south starting at 1:00 PM, targeting streets and residential houses.

Following the bombardment, troops entered the village, executing residents with sabers and bayonets, decapitating men in front of women and children, committing rape, looting homes, and seizing livestock, poultry, gold, silver, grain, and bedding. While adult and teenage males were the primary targets, women, elderly residents, and children were also killed. Surviving male residents were gathered and detained in the local mosque as hostages without food or water for 24 hours, where executions continued overnight. Red Army forces departed Koshekhabl after two days when news reached them of General Anton Denikin's advancing army.

== Aftermath ==
When Pyotr Wrangel's forces departed Koshekhabl for Konstantinovskaya, Wrangel transferred several dozen captured Bolshevik prisoners to local Circassians for trial by an aul court; local residents executed the prisoners following the departure of the troops.

Following the retreat of Bolshevik forces, elders from Koshekhabl, Gatlukay, Urakovsky, and Khakurinokhabl auls submitted petitions to the Mountain Section of the Kuban Rada requesting financial compensation for property damage sustained by the Bolsheviks. Families of soldiers killed while serving in the Circassian Regiment also requested financial assistance.

Following the massacre, victims were buried in burial mounds at the village cemetery near the Laba River. Two burial mounds (one larger and one smaller) were located at the cemetery, containing mass graves. Local residents maintained these mounds across generations while preserving oral accounts of the killings. Local children swimming in the Laba River spoke in whispers about those buried in the mounds.

=== Survivor accounts ===
Witness accounts and oral tradition recorded details regarding the victims:

- Matse Tewo (Adyghe: ТIэо Мацэ) / Matsa Taova (Russian: Маца Таова): Stated that her father, Sefer, was killed near their home by Red Army soldiers while returning from the cemetery.
- Fytse Kobl (Adyghe: Кобл ФIыцIэ) / Fits Koblev (Russian: Фица Коблев): Reported grazing horses with friends 600 meters from the road when Red Army troops entered the village, and stated that soldiers detained male residents in the mosque without food or water for twenty-four hours.
- Muhamed Boreko (Adyghe: Борэкъо Мухьамэд) / Mukhamed Borokov (Russian: Мухамед Бороков): Stated that soldiers executed residents with blades, including decapitating the village imam, Qambulet Kurashin, during prayer. He recorded that Chirzhin Tiberde was killed in his garden, and 78-year-old blind resident Jerime Nalshiq was stripped of his clothes and boots before being killed. He reported looting before escaping to Egerukhay at night.
- Yismahila (Ismail) Aghirzhaneko (Adyghe: Агъыржьанэкъо Исмахьилэ) / Ismail Agerzhanokov (Russian: Исмаил Агержаноков): Recorded that the attack began with artillery shelling at 1:00 PM, resulting in 366 deaths during the initial hours, followed by the detention of surviving residents in the mosque.

== Casualties ==
Historical estimates, folk records, and archive documents state varying casualty figures:

- 214 killed (including two women) and approximately 50 wounded: Reported by historian Y. N. Rayenko-Turansky in his 1927 book Adygea: Before and After October and reprinted in the newspaper Adygeiskaya Zhizn in February 1928. This figure was later cited by historian N. A. Pocheshkhov, who noted that virtually the entire male population was collected in the mosque as hostages. Researcher D. Kh. Mekulov rejected Rayenko-Turansky's version, stating that early Soviet accounts distorted the facts by alleging that Circassians initiated the conflict during the time of a religious holiday by attempting to seize belongings from retreating Red Army refugees.
- 366 killed: Cited by historian T. M. Kat and included in M. Kh. Shebzukhov's 1992 study "Red Terror in Adygea" based on survivor testimony and initial local accounts. Kat recorded that out of Koshekhabl's total population of 3,000 residents, 366 were killed during an initial two-hour attack by Bolshevik forces.
- 368 killed: Inscribed on the official plaque of the memorial monument in Koshekhabl and recorded in the 2023 bibliographic index Memorable Dates for the Republic of Adygea, published by the Information and Bibliographic Department in Maykop.
- Nearly 400 killed: Estimated by historian Aslan Kerashev in his article "Koshekhabl in Blood" (Russian: Кошехабль в крови), stating that nearly 400 residents were killed in front of their families. Over 400 deaths were also stated in 2015 by Koshekhabl District Cossack Society Ataman Nikolai Nesterenko.
- 470 killed: Documented in state archival records from the Central State Archive of the October Revolution (TSGAOR, f. 1318, op. 1, ed. hr. 669, l. 10) and the Central State Archive of the Soviet Army (TSGASA, f. 244, op. 1, d. 55, l. 3). M. Kh. Shebzukhov cited this archival total in his article "The Black Trail of the Red Wheel", supported by researcher D. Kh. Mekulov.
- 500 killed: Recorded in the folk lament "Lament of Koshkhable", which states that five hundred bodies lay in the village in a single day.

== Historiography ==
Public discussion of the event was restricted during the Soviet period. Early Soviet publications addressed the events from the official state narrative. In 1927, Y. N. Rayenko-Turansky published Adygea: Before and After October, stating that Circassians attempted to loot Red Army refugees near the Kurgannaya station, prompting a military response. In February 1928, the newspaper Adygeiskaya Zhizn published the article "The Destruction of Koshekhabl" (Russian: Разгром Кошехабля), repeating Rayenko-Turansky's narrative that Circassians mistook Red Guard units for White Guard forces and fired on them to seize goods, leading to a Red Army counterattack. Another article published in 1928, titled "Who is to blame?" (Russian: Кто виноват?), described the initial Red Guard activity in Adygea as a tragedy caused by White forces taking shelter under Circassian hospitality and undisciplined Red Guard soldiers engaging in looting.

Later Soviet official histories omitted references to civilian deaths in Koshekhabl; the second volume of Essays on the History of Adygea (1981) contained no mention of massacre or physical destruction of civilians during the Civil War in the region.

Following the dissolution of the Soviet Union and the opening of state, party, and special archives in Moscow, Krasnodar, and Maykop in the 1990s, researchers including N. A. Pocheshkhov, T. M. Kat, A. T. Kerashev, and M. Kh. Shebzukhov published studies on the massacre. In their publications, Kerashev and Shebzukhov called for the establishment of monuments dedicated to the victims of the Red Terror in affected Circassian auls and Cossack stanitsas, emphasizing the need to identify all victims by name.

== Lament ==
Local residents preserved memory of the massacre orally through covert performances of folk laments, including "Lament of Koshkhable" (Adyghe: Кощхьаблэ игъыбз).

НахьышIу щыгугъоу, гугъэм тигъакIэу, е-ия
хэбзакIэу уцурэр тшIотыгъэнапэу, ей
Зызетэгъэзым, тымэкъумэщышIэти, е-ия
«Плъыжьы» террорым хьэлачэ тешI гущи тэ.

Гражданы заом… пцIыр къыттыралъхьи, е-ия
Сыд мыгъо гущэкIэ «плъыжьы» шыудзэр, ей
Кощхьаблэ гущэм къыдэзэрэхьэри, е-ия
ГукIэгъу ямыIэу нэIогъэ купыри ар!

Мэщтым чIашIыхьэшъ хъулъфыгъэр зэкIэ, е-ия
Чэщмэфэ псаурэ ащ щагъэнэкIы, ей
Тиефэнд зафэу, КIуращын Къамбулэт, е-ия
Ецэ нэмазым утраукIахь гущи о.

Хьажъ гъэнэкIыгъэу зэолIы купым, е-ия
Бзылъфыгъэ ныбжьыкIэм шъхьакIо къырахи, ей
Налщыкъ Джэрые хьафизэ лIыжъызэ, е-я
ЗырагъэтIэкIышъ ышъхьэ паупкIи, ей.

Лъэпкъыр рыгушхоу пщынэо Iазэу, е-ия
Орэд усыным фэIэпэIасэу, ей
НыбжьыкIэ дэдэу Хьагъэудж ти Мыхьамэт, е-ия
«Плъыжь» мэхъэджэжъмэ атекIодагъэ гущ ар…

ИлъэсиплI псаум Хэгъэгу заом, е-ия
Шъищырэ щэкIрэмэ апсэ атыгъи, ей
ПшIыкIуй илъэсым зы мэфэ закъокIэ, е-ия
Хьэдэ шъитф рагъор чылэм дэохыри, ей!

Translation:

While hoping for the best, as hope makes us younger,
While the newly established system makes our faces like the sun,
Looking at ourselves, we were just simple farmers,
Yet the "Red" terror brought destruction upon us.

In the Civil War, they cast false blame upon us,
What a wretched thing was that "Red" cavalry,
Rushing into poor Koshkhable village,
That merciless gang of arrogants!

They imprisoned all the men inside the mosque,
They starved them for a whole day and night,
Our righteous efendi, Qambulet Kurashin,
They slaughtered you right while you were performing night prayer.

Like a troop of starved vile dogs,
They brought humiliation upon young women,
The old blind hafiz, Jeriye Nalshiq,
They stripped him naked and severed his head.

The master accordionist whom our people were proud of,
So gifted in composing songs,
Our very young Muhammed Haghauj,
Perished at the hands of those "Red" terrorists...

In four full years of the World War,
Three hundred and thirty souls gave their lives,
Yet in the year eighteen, in just a single day,
Five hundred corpses came out of the village!

== Memorialization ==
The memorial in Koshekhabl

On 17 May 1996, the proposal by A. Kerashev and M. Shebzukhov to build a memorial was discussed during an expanded meeting led by the head of the Koshekhabl District Administration, M. Kh. Tkharkakhov. Z. A. Bzasezhev, chairman of the district council of Adyghe Khase, presented and explained the sketch design of the memorial. Sculptor R. Kh. Shikov was selected to construct the monument.

An official commission was established to oversee the design and approval of the monument dedicated to the victims of the September 1918 events in Koshekhabl. The commission was chaired by District Head M. Kh. Tkharkakhov, with Z. A. Bzasezhev as deputy chairman. Additional members included V. I. Kulakov ("Chairman of the District Assembly of Representatives"), A. Kh. Kurashinov ("Professor and Honored Worker of Culture of Russia"), Ch. M. Anzorokov ("Honored Worker of Culture of Russia"), M. A. Kerashev ("Professor and Doctor of Economic Sciences"), along with district administration officials, farm directors, and community representatives.

On 31 May 1996, District Head M. Kh. Tkharkakhov issued an official decree ordering: The construction of a monument in Koshekhabl to commemorate the victims of the events of 24–25 September 1918. The creation of a commission to formulate and approve the memorial design. The commission to submit the approved design to the district administration no later than 10 June 1996.

A granite memorial monument was erected at the cemetery in the eastern part of Koshekhabl to commemorate the victims of the events. The top section of the monument bears the Russian inscription "Memory of you is eternal" (Russian: Память о вас вечна). A plaque on the lower portion of the memorial states: "Here lie the remains of 368 peaceful residents of the aul of Koshekhabl who died on September 24–25, 1918, during a terror action by the Taman Division of the Red Army" (Russian: Здесь покоится прах 368 мирных жителей аула Кошехабль погибших 24-25 сентября 1918 года в ходе террористической акции Таманской дивизии Красной Армии).

A commemoration ceremony is held at the memorial every year. In September 2018, a memorial gathering for the centenary of the event took place at the cemetery, attended by local residents, clergy, researchers, and district head Z. A. Khamirzov. The ceremony opened with a prayer service conducted by village efendi A. Dautov, followed by speeches from Khamirzov, Kh. Borsov, Z. A. Bzasezhev, T. M. Kat, and D. Kh. Mekulov, and concluded with a commemorative meal. The event was included in the 2023 bibliographic index Memorable Dates for the Republic of Adygea, compiled by O. S. Baranovskaya and published by the Information and Bibliographic Department in Maykop.

Annual mourning events at the mass burial mounds are organized by the district branch of Adyghe Khase, with participation from local Cossacks of the Koshekhabl District Cossack Society. On 24 September 2024, a memorial ceremony marking the 106th anniversary of the event took place at the monument. Organized by Amin Khatalievich Nepshekuyev, chairman of Adyghe Khase, the gathering included speeches by Nepshekuyev and Koshekhabl efendi Amerbi Dautov, alongside attendance by village elders, local administration representatives, and members of the public. On 25 September 2025, a prayer service led by Koshekhabl resident B. Vakazhev opened the annual gathering, followed by speeches from Nepshekuyev, Blechepsin efendi I. Kunov, and Rostov-on-Don resident A. Borokov.

== See also ==
- Red Terror
- Russian Civil War
- Koshekhabl
