= Murat Khasanov =

Russian judoka and sambo practitioner

Murat Ruslanovich Khasanov Мура́т Русла́нович Хаса́нов
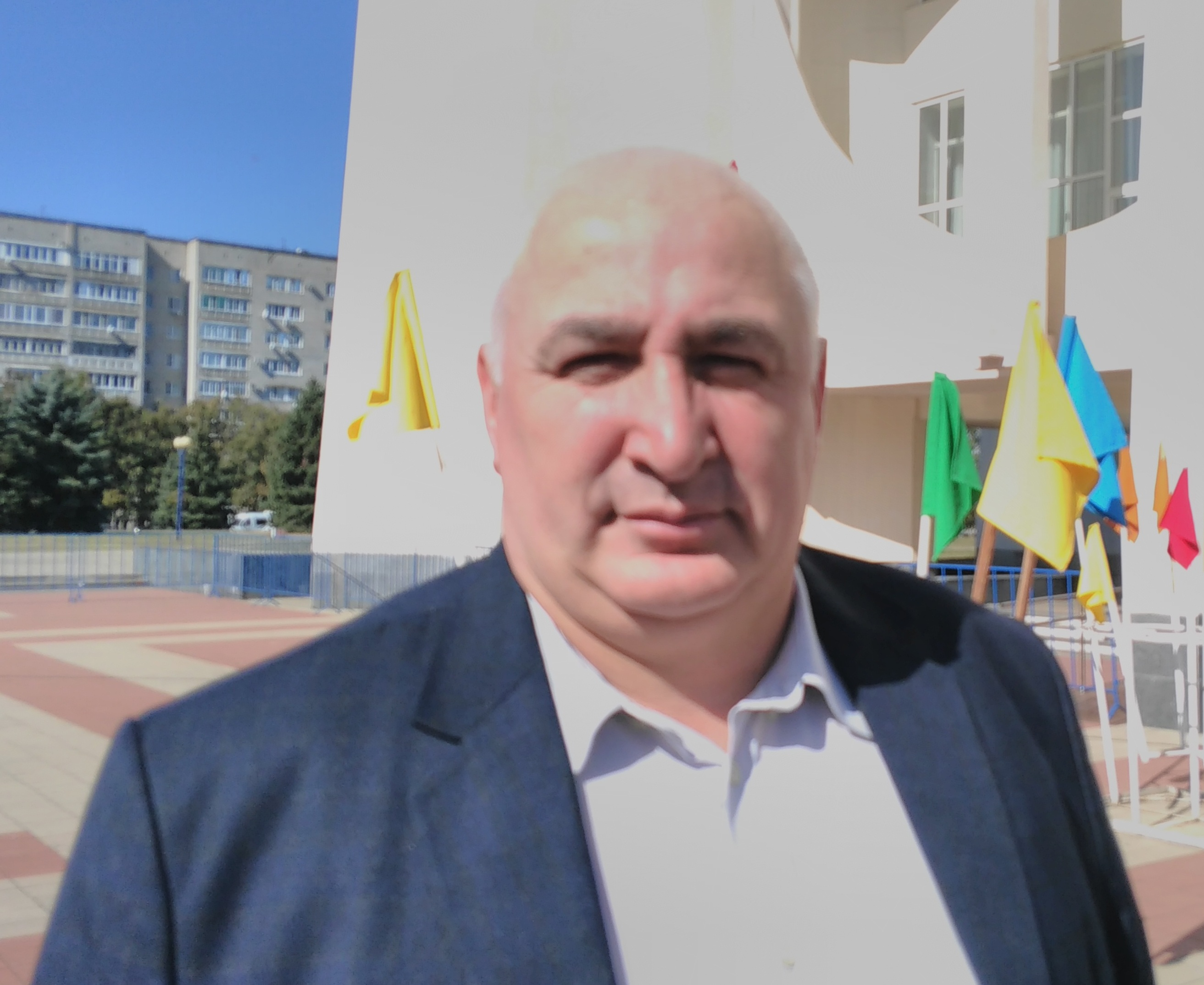
- Portrait of Murat Ruslanovich Khasanov
- Born: December 10, 1970 (age 55); Egerukhay, Adyghe Autonomous Oblast, Russian SFSR, Soviet Union
- Nationality: Russian
- Height: 185 cm (6 ft 1 in)
- Weight: 135 kg (298 lb; 21 st 4 lb)
- Division: Heavyweight
- Style: Sambo, Judo
- Trainer: Sergey Sebelev Victor Nevzorov Arambiy Hapay
- Rank: Honoured Master of Sport of Russia

Murat Ruslanovich Khasanov (Russian: Мура́т Русла́нович Хаса́нов; born 10 December 1970) is a Russian Sambist and Judoka. He is the only 11-time world heavyweight champion in Sambo. Considered to be one of the greatest practitioners of Sambo and is a member of the FIAS Hall of fame. For high sporting achievements, in 1995 he was awarded the honorary title "Honored Master of Sports of Russia" in Sambo, and in 2003 he was awarded the Order of Friendship. He is currently a Member of the State Duma of the Federal Assembly of the Russian Federation.

== Biography ==
Born on December 10, 1970, in the village of Egerukhay within the Koshekhablsky District of Adyghe Autonomous Oblast . He began to play sports in his native village under the guidance of coach Shiham Berzegov. In 1986 he began to study in the Maykop specialized sports school for children and youth of the Olympic reserve.

In 1992 he graduated from the Faculty of Physical Education of the Maykop Pedagogical Institute and in 2004 from the Faculty of Law of the Adyghe State University.

== Sports career ==
Khasanov had a very successful career in Sambo where he won 11 World Championships. He was captain of the Russian National Team in Sambo for over a decade. From 1997 to the end of his sports career, he did not suffer a single defeat.

Khasanov also had success in Judo. At the 1994 European Judo Championships he finished 5th in the heavyweight (+95 kg) class. He finished first in the 1999 Russian National championships and Second in the 2000 World Masters Munich Championships.

== Political career ==
On 17 January 2007, he was appointed Chairman of the Committee for Physical Culture and Sport of the Republic of Adygea.

Since 28 September 2016, he has been a member of the 7th State Duma of the Federal Assembly of the Russian Federation.

=== Sanctions ===
He was sanctioned by the UK government in 2022 in relation to the Russo-Ukrainian War.

On 24 March 2022, the United States Treasury sanctioned him in response to the 2022 Russian invasion of Ukraine.

== Accomplishments ==
=== Sambo ===
- Fédération Internationale de Sambo (FIAS)
  - World Sambo Championships winner (11 times)
  - World Cup Winner (8 times)
  - European Championship winner (7 times)
  - Russian Championship winner (19 times)

=== Judo ===
- World Masters Munich
  - 2000 Munich, 2nd place
- European Judo Union
  - 1994 European Judo Championships 5th place
- Russian Judo Federation
  - 1999 Russian National Championship 1st place
  - 1998 Russian National Championship 3rd place
  - 1997 Russian National Championship 2nd place
