= Plodopitomnik =

Plodopitomnik (Russian: Плодопитомник) is the name of at least two rural localities Russia:

- Plodopitomnik, Republic of Adygea, a selo in Dmitriyevskoye Rural Settlement of Koshekhablsky District
- Plodopitomnik, Amur Oblast, a settlement in urban okrug Blagoveshchensk
