= Chekhrak =

Chekhrak may refer to:

- Chekhrak, Dmitriyevskoye Rural Settlement, Koshekhablsky District, Republic of Adygea, a settlement in Dmitriyevskoye Rural Settlement, Koshekhablsky District, Republic of Adygea, Russia
- Chekhrak, Mayskoye Rural Settlement, Koshekhablsky District, Republic of Adygea, a village (khutor) in Mayskoye Rural Settlement, Koshekhablsky District, Republic of Adygea, Russia
