= Politotdel, Russia =

Politotdel (Russian: Политотде́л) is the name of several rural localities in Russia:

- Politotdel, Republic of Adygea, a khutor in Koshekhablsky District of the Republic of Adygea
- Politotdel, Republic of Bashkortostan, a selo in Shestayevsky Selsoviet of Davlekanovsky District of the Republic of Bashkortostan
- Politotdel, Lipetsk Oblast, a settlement in Petrovsky Selsoviet of Dobrinsky District of Lipetsk Oblast
- Politotdel, Omsk Oblast, a settlement in Lyubino-Malorossky Rural Okrug of Lyubinsky District of Omsk Oblast
