= Maysky =

Maysky (masculine), Mayskaya (feminine), or Mayskoye (neuter) may refer to:

== People ==
- Ivan Maysky (1884–1975), Soviet diplomat, historian, and politician
- Mischa Maisky (b. 1948), Latvian-born Israelian cellist

== Places ==
- Maysky District, a district of the Kabardino-Balkar Republic, Russia
- Maysky Urban Settlement, several municipal urban settlements in Russia
- Maysky (inhabited locality) (Mayskaya, Mayskoye), several inhabited localities in Russia

== Other ==
- Maisky, a pet monkey in Anthony Powell's 1957 novel At Lady Molly's
- Mayskoye mine, a gold mine in Chukotka Autonomous Okrug, Russia

== See also ==
- Ayano-Maysky District, a district of Khabarovsk Krai, Russia
- Ust-Maysky District, a district of the Sakha Republic, Russia
- May (disambiguation)
