= Novoalexeyevsky =

Novoalexeyevsky (Russian: Новоалексеевский) is the name of several rural localities in Russia:

- Novoalexeyevsky, Republic of Adygea, a khutor in Koshekhablsky District of Republic of Adygea
- Novoalexeyevsky, Krasnodar Krai, a khutor in Seversky District of Krasnodar Krai
- Novoalexeyevsky, Oryol Oblast, a village in Dmitrovsky District of Oryol Oblast
