= Dmitriyevsky, Republic of Adygea =

Dmitriyevsky Дмитриевский Дмитриевскэр
- Khutor
- Location within Republic of Adygea Location within Russia
- Coordinates: 44°56′N 40°21′E
- Country: Russia
- Region: Adygea
- District: Koshekhablsky District

Population (2018)
  - Total: 479
- Time zone: UTC+3:00

Dmitriyevsky (Russian: Дмитриевский; Adyghe: Дмитриевскэр) is a rural locality (a khutor) in Dmitriyevskoye Rural Settlement of Koshekhablsky District, Adygea, Russia. The population of this khutor was 479 as of 2018. There are 9 streets.

== Geography ==
Dmitriyevsky is located 14 km northwest of Koshekhabl (the district's administrative centre) by road. Druzhba is the nearest rural locality.
