= Ali Koshev =

Aliy Kosh
- Къощ Юусыф ыкъо Алий
- Born: 1 September 1922; Blechepsin, Koshekhablsky District, Krasnodar Krai, Russian SFSR (now Republic of Adygea, Russia)
- Died: 13 January 1971 (aged 48); Maykop, Adyghe Autonomous Oblast, Krasnodar Krai, Russian SFSR, Soviet Union
- Military career
- Allegiance: Soviet Union
- Branch: Red Army (Engineer troops)
- Service years: 1941–1945
- Rank: Yefreytor (Corporal)
- Units: 90th Independent Sapper Battalion; 3rd Tank Corps; 2nd Tank Army
- Commands: Sapper
- Conflicts: World War II
- Awards: Hero of the Soviet Union; Order of Lenin; Medal "For Courage"; Medal "For the Defense of the Caucasus"; Medal "For the Victory over Germany in the Great Patriotic War 1941–1945"

Aliy Kosh (Adyghe: Къощ Юусыф ыкъо Алий, Russian: Алий Юсуфович Кошев; 1 September 1922 – 13 January 1971) was a Red Army yefreytor (corporal), a sapper in the 90th Independent Sapper Battalion of the 3rd Tank Corps (2nd Tank Army), and a Hero of the Soviet Union.

== Biography ==
Aliy Yusufovich Koshev was born on 1 September 1922, in the aul of Blechepsin in the Koshekhablsky District of the Adyghe Autonomous Oblast to a peasant family. He was of Circassian (Adyghe) ethnicity. After completing eight years of schooling, he worked as a postman and later as the secretary of the kolkhoz board.

He was drafted into the Red Army on 18 October 1941, and arrived at the front that same month. Throughout the war, he served as a sapper and later as a starshina of a sapper company on the Southern, North Caucasian, Transcaucasian, Central, 1st Ukrainian, 2nd Ukrainian, and 1st Belorussian fronts. He became a member of the Communist Party of the Soviet Union in 1944.

His combat record included:

- Battles on the Mius river, the defense of Rostov-on-Don, construction of engineering facilities, and battles in the Caucasus in 1941–1942;
- The Battle of Kursk near the station of Ponyri, the liberation of Left-bank Ukraine, and crossing the Desna, Dnieper, and Pripyat rivers in 1943;
- The Korsun-Shevchenkovsky and Uman–Botoșani operations, the crossing of the Dniester, and the occupation of Moldavia and Romania in 1944;
- The Warsaw-Poznań, East Pomeranian, and Berlin operations in 1945.

In 1945, Starshina A. Y. Koshev was placed in the reserve. He lived in Maykop and worked as the director of the Kolkhozniks' House. He died on 13 January 1971, in Maykop, and was buried in his native aul of Blechepsin.

== Feat ==
Yefreytor Koshev distinguished himself during the ferrying of tanks across the Dniester river near the city of Soroca (Moldavia) in March 1944.

During the crossing, the ferry's cable was damaged by artillery shrapnel, and the ferry began to drift downstream. Koshev plunged into the freezing water in an attempt to retrieve the cable, which had caught on an underwater pile. Diving three times, he managed to retrieve the end of the heavy cable and secure it back to the ferry, saving the tanks from being lost.

By a decree of the Presidium of the Supreme Soviet of the USSR on 13 September 1944, for the exemplary execution of combat missions and the courage and heroism displayed in the fight against the German fascist invaders, Yefreytor Aliy Yusufovich Koshev was awarded the title of Hero of the Soviet Union, along with the Order of Lenin and the "Gold Star" medal (No. 4566).

== Awards ==
- Hero of the Soviet Union (13 September 1944)
- Order of Lenin (13 September 1944)
- Medal "For Courage" (18 August 1943)
- Medal "For the Defense of the Caucasus" (25 April 1945)
- Jubilee Medal "In Commemoration of the 100th Anniversary of the Birth of Vladimir Ilyich Lenin"
- Medal "For the Victory over Germany in the Great Patriotic War 1941–1945" (9 May 1945)
- Jubilee Medal "Twenty Years of Victory in the Great Patriotic War 1941–1945" (7 May 1965)
- Other medals

== Memorials ==
- The Hero's name is engraved in gold letters in the Hall of Glory at the Central Museum of the Great Patriotic War in Victory Park, Moscow.
- A memorial monument was erected at his grave.
- Streets are named after him in Tlyustenkhabl and Blechepsin, as well as School No. 5 in his native village.
- A bust of Koshev is installed in front of the school in Blechepsin.
- A commemorative plaque is installed on the facade of the house where he lived in Maykop (10 Lenin Street).

== See also ==
- List of Heroes of the Soviet Union

== Bibliography ==
- Shkadov, Ivan (1987). Герои Советского Союза: Краткий биографический словарь [Heroes of the Soviet Union: A Brief Biographical Dictionary] (in Russian). Vol. 1. Moscow: Voenizdat.
- Sidzhakh, Khazretbiy (2005). Твои Герои, Адыгея: очерки о Героях Советского Союза [Your Heroes, Adygea: Essays on Heroes of the Soviet Union] (in Russian). Maykop: Adyghe Republican Book Publishing House. pp. 416. ISBN 5-7608-0459-6.
- Герои битвы за Кавказ [Heroes of the Battle for the Caucasus] (in Russian). Tskhinvali: Iryston. 1975.
- Золотые Звёзды Адыгеи [Gold Stars of Adygea] (in Russian) (2nd ed.). Maykop. 1980.
- Aparin, N. G. (1980). "Кошев Алий Юсуфович [Koshev Aliy Yusufovich]". Золотые Звёзды Адыгеи [Gold Stars of Adygea] (in Russian). Maykop. pp. 44–45.
