= Kazyonno-Kuzhorsky =

Khutor in Adygea, Russia

Kazyonno-Kuzhorsky Казённо-Кужорский Казеннэ-Къужъыор
- Khutor
- Location within Republic of Adygea Location within Russia
- Coordinates: 44°39′N 40°39′E
- Country: Russia
- Region: Adygea
- District: Koshekhablsky District

Population (2018)
  - Total: 774
- Time zone: UTC+3:00

Kazyonno-Kuzhorsky (Russian: Казённо-Кужорский; Adyghe: Казеннэ-Къужъыор) is a rural locality (a khutor) in Natyrbovskoye Rural Settlement of Koshekhablsky District, Adygea, Russia. The population of this khutor was 774 as of 2018. There are 9 streets.

== Geography ==
Kazyonno-Kuzhorsky is located 32 km south of Koshekhabl (the district's administrative centre) by road. Volnoye is the nearest rural locality.
