= Otradny, Koshekhablsky District, Republic of Adygea =

Khutor in Adygea, Russia

Otradny Отрадный
- Khutor
- Location within Republic of Adygea Location within Russia
- Coordinates: 44°56′N 40°20′E
- Country: Russia
- Region: Adygea
- District: Koshekhablsky District

Population (2018)
  - Total: 170
- Time zone: UTC+3:00

Otradny (Russian: Отрадный) is a rural locality (a khutor) in Dmitriyevskoye Rural Settlement of Koshekhablsky District, Adygea, Russia. The population was 170 as of 2018. There are 4 streets.

== Geography ==
Otradny is located 16 km northwest of Koshekhabl (the district's administrative centre) by road. Plodopitomnik is the nearest rural locality.
