= Iris schelkownikowii =

Scientific classification
- Kingdom: Plantae
- Clade: Tracheophytes
- Clade: Angiosperms
- Clade: Monocots
- Order: Asparagales
- Family: Iridaceae
- Genus: Iris
- Species: I. schelkownikowii

Binomial name
- Iris schelkownikowii (Fomin.) Fomin.

Synonyms
- Iris acutiloba var. schelkownikowii Fomin

Species of flowering plant

Iris schelkownikowii is a species in the genus Iris, it is also in the subgenus of Iris and in the Oncocyclus section. It is from the Transcaucasus region of Azerbaijan. It has large flowers in shades of bluish or grey-purple violet, with dark brown veining. It also has a reddish purple signal patch and yellow beard.

== Description ==
I. schelkownikowii creates small clumps of plants, withleaves that stay intact until the end of the summer.

It has slightly fragrant, flowers which are 8–10 cm (3–4 in) cm across.

Like other irises, it has two pairs of petals: three large sepals (outer petals), known as the 'falls', and three inner, smaller petals (or tepals), known as the 'standards'. The standards are bluish, or grey-purple violet. They are darker than the falls and have dark brown veining. The falls have a reddish/purple blotch, or purple signal patch. Behind the signal patch on the falls is a row of short, dense bristles or hairs called the 'beard' which is yellow.

=== Biochemistry ===
As most irises are diploid, having two sets of chromosomes. This can be used to identify hybrids and classification of groupings. It has a chromosome count of 2n=20.

== Taxonomy ==
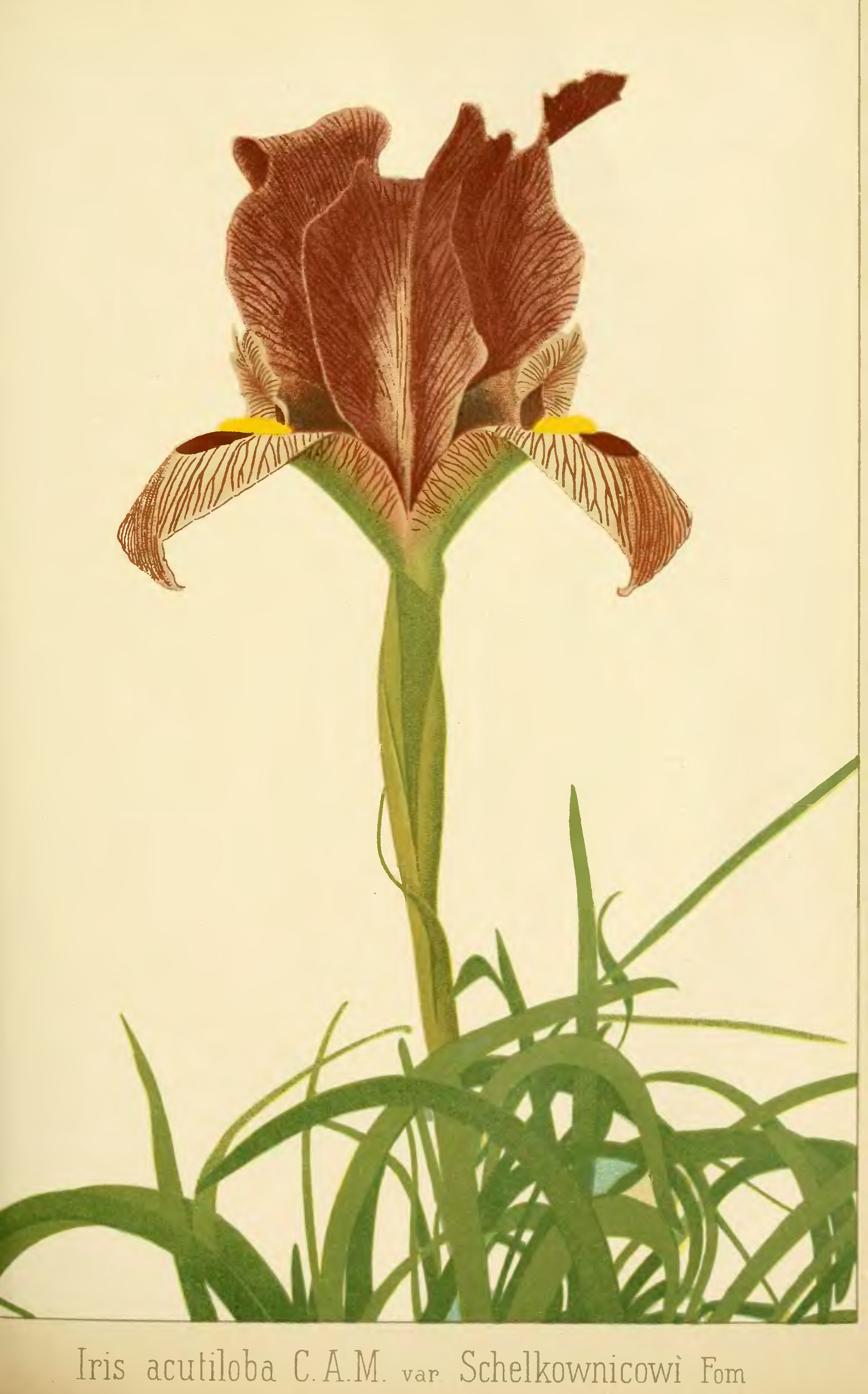
Illustration

It was originally described as Iris acutiloba var. schelkownicowii by A.V. Fomin in 1904. Fomin raised it to a full species in 1909. The Latin specific epithet schelkownikowii refers to botanist Alexandr Bebutovicz Schelkownikow (or Schelk.) (1870–1933). He was a co-collector of plant specimens with Georg Jurij Nikolaewitch Woronow.

It has also been misspelled with a single i at the end as schelkownikowi. Most of these are early mentions pre 1970s.

Both forms of the name (ending in ..cowii or ..kowii) still exist today but it has been verified as Iris schelkownikowii by United States Department of Agriculture and the Agricultural Research Service on 27 February 2002 and then updated on 7 July 2016.

== Distribution and habitat ==
It is native to temperate Asia.

=== Range ===
It is found in the Southern and eastern Transcaucasus regions, in Azerbaijan.

=== Habitat ===
It prefers to grow in a hot and dry climate, such as steppes.

== Cultivation ==
The clumps of I. schelkownii should be divided every second year, so that it will continue to make more flowers the next year.

== Toxicity ==
Like many other irises, most parts of the plant are poisonous (including rhizome and leaves), if mistakenly ingested, it can cause stomach pains and vomiting. Also handling the plant may cause a skin irritation or an allergic reaction.

== Other sources ==
- Komarov, V.L. (ed.) (1935). Flora SSSR 4: 1–586. Izdatel'stov Akademii Nauk SSSR, Leningrad.
- Takhtajan, A.L. (ed.) (2006). Conspectus Florae Caucasi 2: 1–466. Editio Universitatis Petropolitanae.
- Innes, C. (1985). The World of Iridaceae: 1–407. Holly Gare International Ltd., Ashington.
- Czerepanov, S.K. (1995). Vascular Plants of Russia and Adjacent States (The Former USSR): 1–516. Cambridge University Press.
- Obshchestvo, (1952). Contributiones pro fauna et flora Unionis Rerum Publicarum Sovieticarum Socialisticarum: Sectio botanica
- Data related to Iris schelkownikowii at Wikispecies
