= Krasny Fars =

Khutor in Adygea, Russia

Krasny Fars Красный Фарс Фэрзэ Плъыжь
- Khutor
- Location within Republic of Adygea Location within Russia
- Coordinates: 44°54′N 40°21′E
- Country: Russia
- Region: Adygea
- District: Koshekhablsky District

Population (2018)
  - Total: 145
- Time zone: UTC+3:00

Krasny Fars (Russian: Красный Фарс; Adyghe: Фэрзэ Плъыжь) is a rural locality (a khutor) in Dmitriyevskoye Rural Settlement of Koshekhablsky District, Adygea, Russia. The population was 145 as of 2018. There are 5 streets.

== Geography ==
Krasny Fars is located 15 km west of Koshekhabl (the district's administrative centre) by road. Novoalexeyevsky is the nearest rural locality.
