= Shiraki =

Shiraki (written: 白木 or 素木) is a Japanese surname. The word shiraki means "plain wood, unpainted wood, unvarnished wood; a bow made of unvarnished wood; Neoshirakia" in the Japanese language. In Old Japanese, Shiraki (also pronounced as Shiragi) was also the Japanese name of the kingdom of Silla (新羅) on the Korean Peninsula. Notable people with the surname include:

- Hideo Shiraki (白木 秀雄, 1933–1972), Japanese jazz drummer and bandleader
- Mari Shiraki (白木 万理, born 1937), Japanese actress
- Shizu Shiraki (素木 しづ, 1895–1918), Japanese writer

== Fictional characters ==
- Meiko Shiraki, a character in the manga series Prison School

== See also ==
- Shirah Ki, a village in Salmas County, West Azerbaijan Province, Iran
