= Ignatyevsky =

Khutor in Adygea, Russia

Ignatyevsky Игнатьевский
- Khutor
- Location within Republic of Adygea Location within Russia
- Coordinates: 44°50′N 40°27′E
- Country: Russia
- Region: Adygea
- District: Koshekhablsky District

Population (2018)
  - Total: 916
- Time zone: UTC+3:00

Ignatyevsky (Russian: Игнатьевский) is a rural locality (a khutor) and the administrative center of Ignatyevskoye Rural Settlement of Koshekhablsky District, Adygea, Russia. The population of this khutor was 916 as of 2018. There are 19 streets.

== Geography ==
Ignatyevsky is located 9 km south of Koshekhabl (the district's administrative centre) by road. Blechepsin is the nearest rural locality.

== Ethnicity ==
The Khutor is inhabited by Russians, Armenians, Adygheans, Avars, Uzbeks and Tatars.
