= Khodz, Russia =

Aul in Adygea, Russia

Khodz Ходзь Фэдз
- Aul
- Location within Republic of Adygea Location within Russia
- Coordinates: 44°30′N 40°42′E
- Country: Russia
- Region: Adygea
- District: Koshekhablsky District

Population (2018)
  - Total: 2,772
- Time zone: UTC+3:00

Khodz (Russian: Ходзь; Adyghe: Фэдз) is a rural locality (an aul) in Khodzinskoye Rural Settlement of Koshekhablsky District, Adygea, Russia. The population was 2772 as of 2018. There are 50 streets.

== Geography ==
The aul is located on the left bank of the Khodz River, 51 km south of Koshekhabl (the district's administrative centre) by road. Karmolino-Gidroitsky is the nearest rural locality.

== Ethnicity ==
The aul is inhabited by Circassians (Adyghes).
