= Natyrbovo =

Village in Adygea, Russia

Natyrbovo Натырбово Нэтырбий
- Village
- Location within Republic of Adygea Location within Russia
- Coordinates: 44°43′N 40°37′E
- Country: Russia
- Region: Adygea
- District: Koshekhablsky District

Population (2018)
  - Total: 3,097
- Time zone: UTC+3:00

Natyrbovo (Russian: Натырбово; Adyghe: Нэтырбий) is a rural locality (a selo) and the administrative center of Natyrbovskoye Rural Settlement of Koshekhablsky District, Adygea, Russia. The population was 3097 as of 2018. There are 26 streets.

== Geography ==
The village is located on the left bank of the Laba River, 23 km south of Koshekhabl (the district's administrative centre) by road. Rodnikovskaya is the nearest rural locality.
