= Tsug Teuchezh =

- Теуцожь Цыгъу
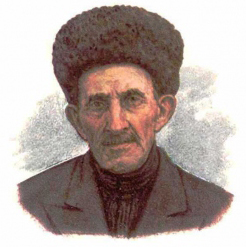
- Born: Tewchoj Aliyiqo Tahir; Tagir Aliyevich Teuchezh; 15 August 1855; Gabukay, Bzhedug Principality, Circassia
- Died: 26 January 1940 (aged 84); Ponezhukay, Teuchezhsky District, Adygea
- Citizenship: Circassia; Russian Empire; Soviet Union
- Occupations: Poet, ashug
- Writing career
- Language: Adyghe
- Notable works: War of the Princes and Nobles
- Notable awards: Order of the Red Banner of Labour

Tewchoj Tsighu or Tsug Teuchezh (Adyghe: Теуцожь Цыгъу; Russian: Цуг Теуче́ж; legal birth name Tagir Aliyevich Teuchezh, Adyghe: Теуцожь Алийыкъо Тахьир; Russian: Таги́р Али́евич Теуче́ж; August 15 [O.S. August 3] 1855, Gabukay – January 26, 1940, Ponezhukay) was a Circassian (Adyghe) Soviet poet, ashug, and the People's Poet of Adygea.

Teuchezh is considered a transitional figure in national culture; as Abu Shkhalakho noted, "Teuchezh Tsighu's poetic creativity became a bridge for Adyghe literature that connected and united two banks—folklore and written literature."

== Biography ==
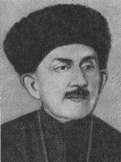
Tsug Teuchezh

Teuchezh was born on August 15, 1855, in the aul of Gabukay in Bzhedugia (now the Republic of Adygea) into a poor Adyghe family. During his childhood, he worked as a farm laborer (batrak) and later became a skilled saddler. Teuchezh was a composer and performer of folk songs, accompanying himself on the shichepshin (a traditional bowed instrument). Although a significant portion of his work remained part of the oral tradition, many of his poems and songs were eventually transcribed into book form. Teuchezh could not read or write; he composed his works orally and dictated them to others. Despite this, he familiarized himself with the works of Adyghe poets and writers by having others read to him. He was notably influenced by the Russian poet Alexander Pushkin. After hearing a translation of Pushkin's poem Poltava (translated into Adyghe by Ahmed Khatko), Teuchezh utilized its structural elements to compose his own major work, The War of Princes and Nobles (Adyghe: Пщы-Оркъ Зао).

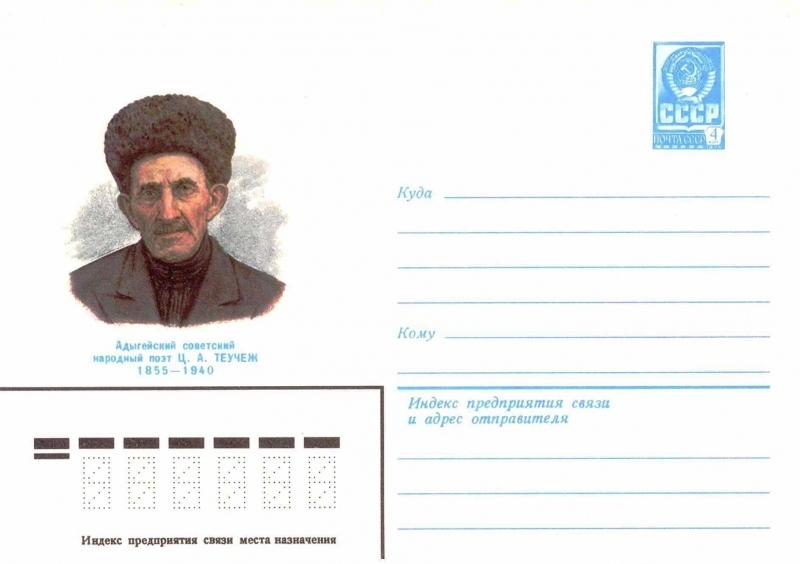
Envelope with Tsug Teuchezh Portrait of the USSR Post Office 1980

Although composed orally, The War of Princes and Nobles (1938) is constructed with internal depth and adherence to literary standards, featuring distinct characterizations of different social groups and a thorough depiction of warfare. His other major historical works include Urysbiy Mefoko (1939) and the poem The Motherland (1939). His shorter verses include "Happiness", "Stakhanov", and "I Will March With You in My Old Age". In 1939, he was accepted into the Union of Soviet Writers and awarded the Order of the Red Banner of Labour. Tsug Teuchezh died on January 26, 1940, in the aul of Ponezhukay at the age of 85.

== Family ==
His son, Nukh Teuchezh, served as the Chairman of the Adyghe Regional Executive Committee. His relatives also in live in Turkey in Marmara and Bozüyük region.

== Memory ==
External image
- Bust of the Adyghe ashug Teuchezh

- In 1955, a bust monument to the ashug was installed in his homeland (Republic of Adygea, Teuchezhsky District, Ponezhukay aul, Lenin Street, 69).
- Teuchezhsky District in Adygea is named after the poet, as are various secondary schools and streets in the region.
- The city of Adygeysk was named Teuchezhsk from 1976 to 1992.
- In 1982, to celebrate the 125th anniversary of the poet's birth, the Teuchezh Tsighu House-Museum and a monument to the poet were ceremoniously opened in Gabukay by decree of the Adyghe Regional Executive Committee.

== Books ==
- Selected Works. Moscow, 1956.
- A Share of Happiness (Adyghe: Nasip Iah). — Maykop, 1980 (Published in 1982 to commemorate his 125th anniversary; contains works in Russian and Adyghe).
- Historical poems: War with the Princes and Nobles (1938), Urysbiy Mefoko (1939), The Motherland (1939).
- Poems: "Happiness", "Stakhanov", "I Will March With You in My Old Age", "Old and New", "Our Ploughmen", and others.

== Awards ==
- Order of the Red Banner of Labour (January 31, 1939)
- People's Poet of Adygea
