= Volnoye, Republic of Adygea =

Village in Adygea, Russia

Volnoye Вольное Шъхьафит
- Village
- Location within Republic of Adygea Location within Russia
- Coordinates: 44°37′N 40°42′E
- Country: Russia
- Region: Adygea
- District: Koshekhablsky District

Population (2018)
  - Total: 3,595
- Time zone: UTC+3:00 (Moscow Time)
- ISO 3166 code: RUS

Volnoye (Russian: Вольное; Adyghe: Шъхьафит) is a rural locality (a selo) and the administrative center of Volnenskoye Rural Settlement of Koshekhablsky District, Adygea, Russia. The population of this village was 3595 as of 2018. There are 37 streets.

== Geography ==
The village is located on the left bank of the Laba River, 38 km south of Koshekhabl (the district's administrative centre) by road. Labinsk is the nearest rural locality.
