= Komsomolsky, Republic of Adygea =

Komsomolsky Комсомольский Комсомольскэр
- Settlement
- Location within Republic of Adygea Location within Russia
- Coordinates: 44°54′N 40°25′E
- Country: Russia
- Region: Adygea
- District: Koshekhablsky District

Population (2018)
  - Total: 159
- Time zone: UTC+3:00

Komsomolsky (Russian: Комсомольский; Adyghe: Комсомольскэр) is a rural locality (a settlement) in Mayskoye Rural Settlement of Koshekhablsky District, Adygea, Russia. The population was 159 as of 2018.

== Geography ==
Komsomolsky is located 9 km west of Koshekhabl (the district's administrative centre) by road. Nechayevsky is the nearest rural locality.
