= Hypericum fissurale =

Conservation status
- Critically Endangered (IUCN 3.1)

Scientific classification
- Kingdom: Plantae
- Clade: Tracheophytes
- Clade: Angiosperms
- Clade: Eudicots
- Clade: Rosids
- Order: Malpighiales
- Family: Hypericaceae
- Genus: Hypericum
- Section: H. sect. Taeniocarpium
- Species: H. fissurale

Binomial name
- Hypericum fissurale Woronow

Species of flowering plant in the St John's wort family

Hypericum fissurale, known as cracked St. John's wort, is a flowering plant in the St. Johns's wort family (Hypericaceae) endemic to northeastern Turkey. It is considered critically endangered on the IUCN Red List due to its very limited distribution and declining population. It was first formally named by Jurij Nikolaewitch Woronow in 1912. It is a small perennial herb in the section Hypericum sect. Taeniocarpium, reaching around 22 cm (8.7 in) in height. Like most Hypericum species, it has flowers with five yellow petals and numerous stamens. Hypericum fissurale is closely related to Hypericum armenum.
