= Psekups (rural locality) =

Psekups Псекупс (Russian) Псэкъупс (Adyghe)
- Khutor
- Location within Republic of Adygea Location within Russia
- Coordinates: 44°50′N 39°12′E
- Country: Russia
- Region: Adygea

Population (2024)
  - Total: 928
- Time zone: UTC+3:00

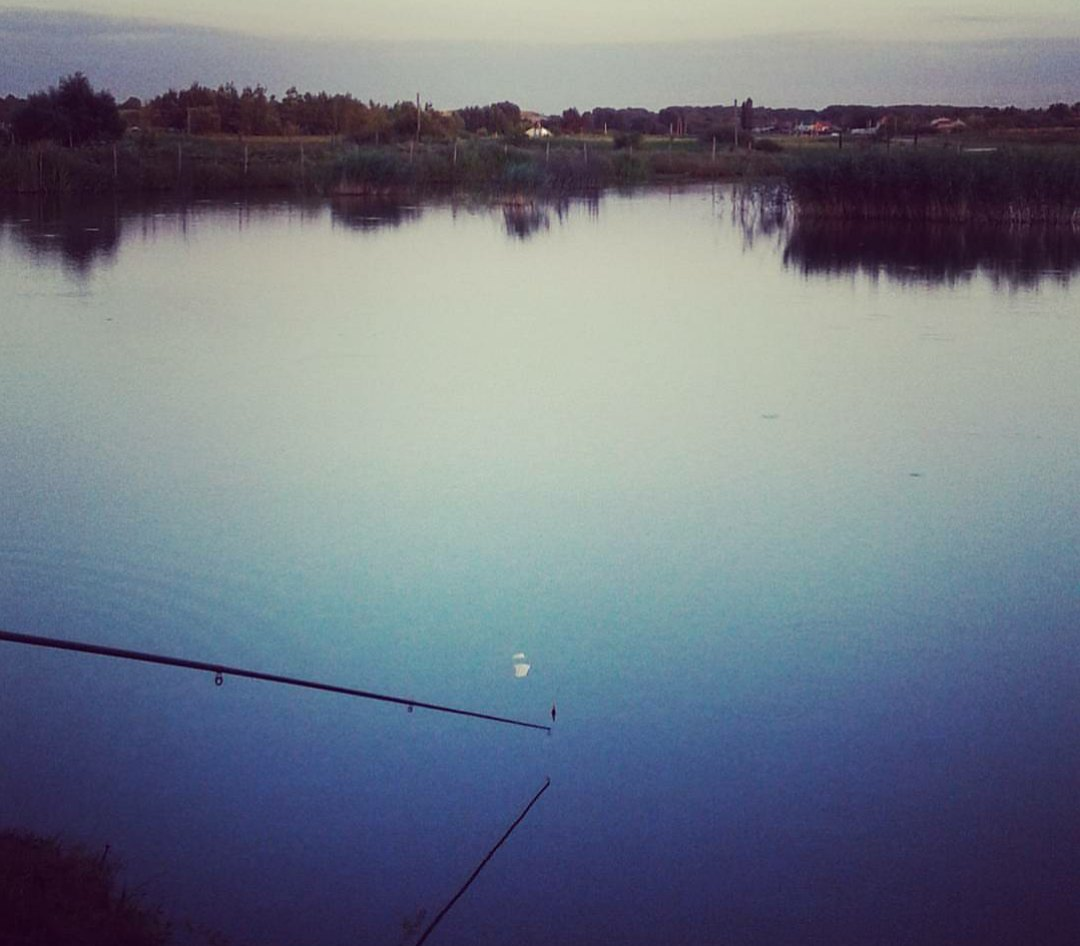
Psekups

Psekups (Russian: Псекупс; Adyghe: Псэкъупс) is a rural locality (a khutor) in Adygeysk District of Adygea, Russia. The population is estimated to be around 928 as of 2024, a slight increase from 907 in 2018.

== Geography ==
The khutor is located on the left bank of the Psekups River, 7 km south of Adygeysk (the district's administrative centre) by road. Molkino is the nearest locality.

== Demographics ==
The khutor is mostly inhabited by indigenous Circassians (Adyghes) and a Russian minority.
