= Blechepsin =

Blechepsin Блечепсин Блащэпсынэ
- Aul
- Location within Republic of Adygea Location within Southern Federal District Location within Russia
- Coordinates: 44°49′N 40°29′E
- Country: Russia
- Region: Adygea
- District: Koshekhablsky District

Population (2018)
  - Total: 3,084
- Time zone: UTC+3:00

Blechepsin (Russian: Блечепсин; Adyghe: Блащэпсынэ) is a rural locality (an aul) and the administrative center of Blechepsinskoye Rural Settlement of Koshekhablsky District, Adygea, Russia. The population of this village was 3084 as of 2018. There are 27 streets. Blechepsin postal code is 385431.

== Geography ==
Blechepsin is located 10 km south of Koshekhabl (the district's administrative centre) by road. Ignatyevsky is the nearest rural locality.

== Ethnicity ==
The aul is inhabited by Adyghes.
