= Krasny, Republic of Adygea =

Khutor in Adygea, Russia

Krasny Красный Плъыжьы
- Khutor
- Location within Republic of Adygea Location within Russia
- Coordinates: 44°46′N 40°31′E
- Country: Russia
- Region: Adygea
- District: Koshekhablsky District

Population (2018)
  - Total: 221
- Time zone: UTC+3:00

Krasny (Russian: Красный; Adyghe: Плъыжьы) is a rural locality (a khutor) in Mayskoye Rural Settlement of Koshekhablsky District, Adygea, Russia. The population was 221 as of 2018. There are 2 streets.
