= Druzhba, Republic of Adygea =

Druzhba Дружба Зэкъошныгъ
- Village
- Location within Republic of Adygea Location within Russia
- Coordinates: 44°56′N 40°22′E
- Country: Russia
- Region: Adygea
- District: Koshekhablsky District

Population (2018)
  - Total: 736
- Time zone: UTC+3:00

Druzhba (Russian: Дружба; Adyghe: Зэкъошныгъ) is a rural locality (a settlement) and the administrative center of Dmitriyevskoye Rural Settlement of Koshekhablsky District, Adygea, Russia. The population of this settlement was 736 as of 2018. There are 9 streets.

== Geography ==
Druzhba is located 12 km northwest of Koshekhabl (the district's administrative centre) by road. Chekhrak is the nearest rural locality.
