= Chekhrak, Mayskoye Rural Settlement, Koshekhablsky District, Republic of Adygea =

Chekhrak Чехрак
- Village
- Location within Republic of Adygea Location within Russia
- Coordinates: 44°45′N 40°31′E
- Country: Russia
- Region: Adygea
- District: Koshekhablsky District

Population (2018)
  - Total: 10
- Time zone: UTC+3:00

Chekhrak (Russian: Чехрак) is a rural locality in the Mayskoye Rural Settlement of Koshekhablsky District, Adygea, Russia. The population was 10 as of 2018.

== Geography ==
Chekhrak is located on the Chokhrak River, 19 km south of Koshekhabl (the district's administrative centre) by road.
