= Chekhrak, Dmitriyevskoye Rural Settlement, Koshekhablsky District, Republic of Adygea =

Chekhrak Чехрак Щэхъурадж
- Village
- Location within Republic of Adygea Location within Russia
- Coordinates: 44°56′N 40°22′E
- Country: Russia
- Region: Adygea
- District: Koshekhablsky District

Population (2018)
  - Total: 506
- Time zone: UTC+3:00

Chekhrak (Russian: Чехрак; Adyghe: Щэхъурадж) is a rural locality (a settlement) in Dmitriyevskoye Rural Settlement of Koshekhablsky District, Adygea, Russia. The population was 506 as of 2018. There are 10 streets.

== Geography ==
Chekhrak is located 12 km northwest of Koshekhabl (the district's administrative centre) by road. Druzhba is the nearest rural locality.
