= Shelkovnikov (rural locality) =

Khutor in Adygea, Russia

Shelkovnikov Шелковников
- Khutor
- Location within Republic of Adygea Location within Russia
- Coordinates: 44°34′N 40°43′E
- Country: Russia
- Region: Adygea
- District: Koshekhablsky District

Population (2018)
  - Total: 304
- Time zone: UTC+3:00

Shelkovnikov (Russian: Шелковников) is a rural locality (a khutor) in Volnenskoye Rural Settlement of Koshekhablsky District, Adygea, Russia. The population was 304 as of 2018. There are 4 streets.

== Geography ==
Shelkovnikov is located 43 km south of Koshekhabl (the district's administrative centre) by road. Volnoye is the nearest rural locality.
