= Politotdel, Republic of Adygea =

Politotdel Политотдел
- Khutor
- Location within Republic of Adygea Location within Russia
- Coordinates: 44°56′N 40°20′E
- Country: Russia
- Region: Adygea
- District: Koshekhablsky District

Population (2018)
  - Total: 230
- Time zone: UTC+3:00

Politotdel (Russian: Политотдел) is a rural locality (a khutor) in Dmitriyevskoye Rural Settlement of Koshekhablsky District, Adygea, Russia. The population was 230 as of 2018. There are 4 streets.

== Geography ==
Politotdel is located 14 km northwest of Koshekhabl (the district's administrative centre) by road. Dmitriyevsky is the nearest rural locality.

== Ethnicity ==
The khutor is inhabited by Tatars.
