= Maysky Urban Settlement =

Maysky Urban Settlement is the name of several municipal formations in Russia.

- Maysky Urban Settlement, a municipal formation which the town of Maysky and five rural localities in Maysky District of the Kabardino-Balkar Republic are incorporated as
- Maysky Urban Settlement, a municipal formation which the work settlement of Maysky in Sovetsko-Gavansky District of Khabarovsk Krai is incorporated as

== See also ==
- Maysky
