= Plodopitomnik, Republic of Adygea =

Village in Adygea, Russia

Plodopitomnik Плодопитомник
- Village
- Location within Republic of Adygea Location within Russia
- Coordinates: 44°55′N 40°21′E
- Country: Russia
- Region: Adygea
- District: Koshekhablsky District

Population (2018)
  - Total: 90
- Time zone: UTC+3:00

Plodopitomnik (Russian: Плодопитомник) is a rural locality (a selo) in Dmitriyevskoye Rural Settlement of Koshekhablsky District, Adygea, Russia. The population was 90 as of 2018. There is 1 street.

== Geography ==
Plodopitomnik is located 14 km northwest of Koshekhabl (the district's administrative centre) by road. Novoalexeyevsky is the nearest rural locality.
