= Adygeysk =

Adygeysk Адыгейск Микъагъэ (Ubykh)
- Town

Other transcription(s)
  - Adyghe: Адыгэкъалэ
  - Ubykh: Микъагъэ
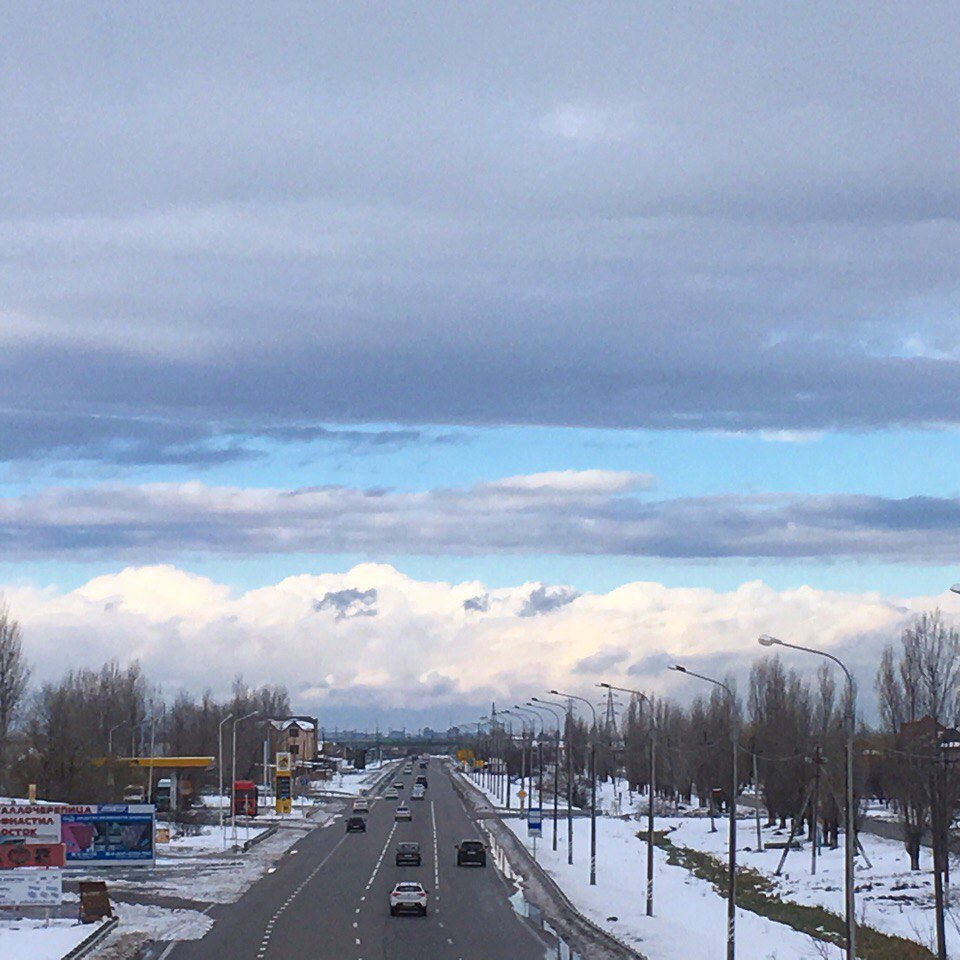
- View of the federal highway M4 "Don"

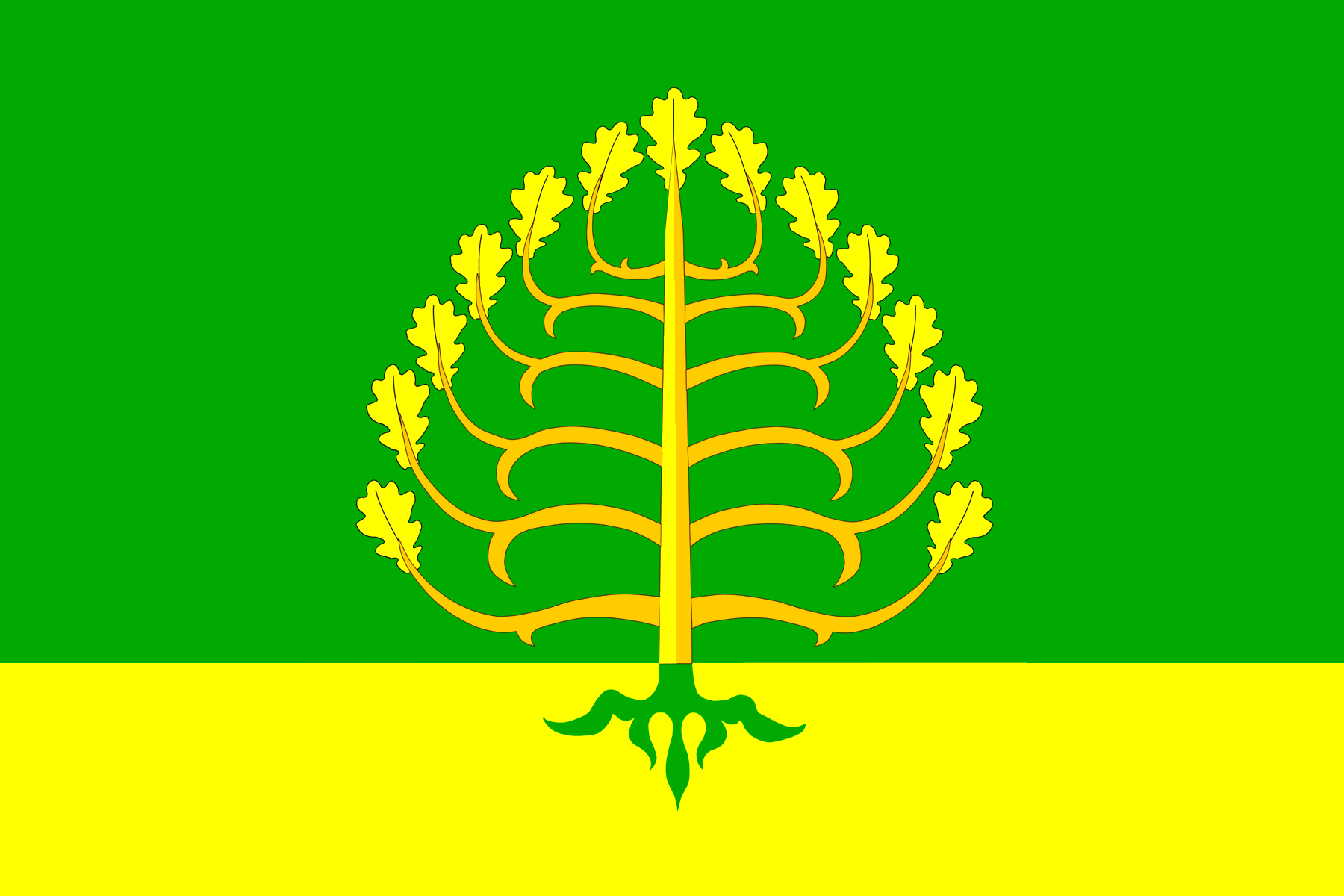
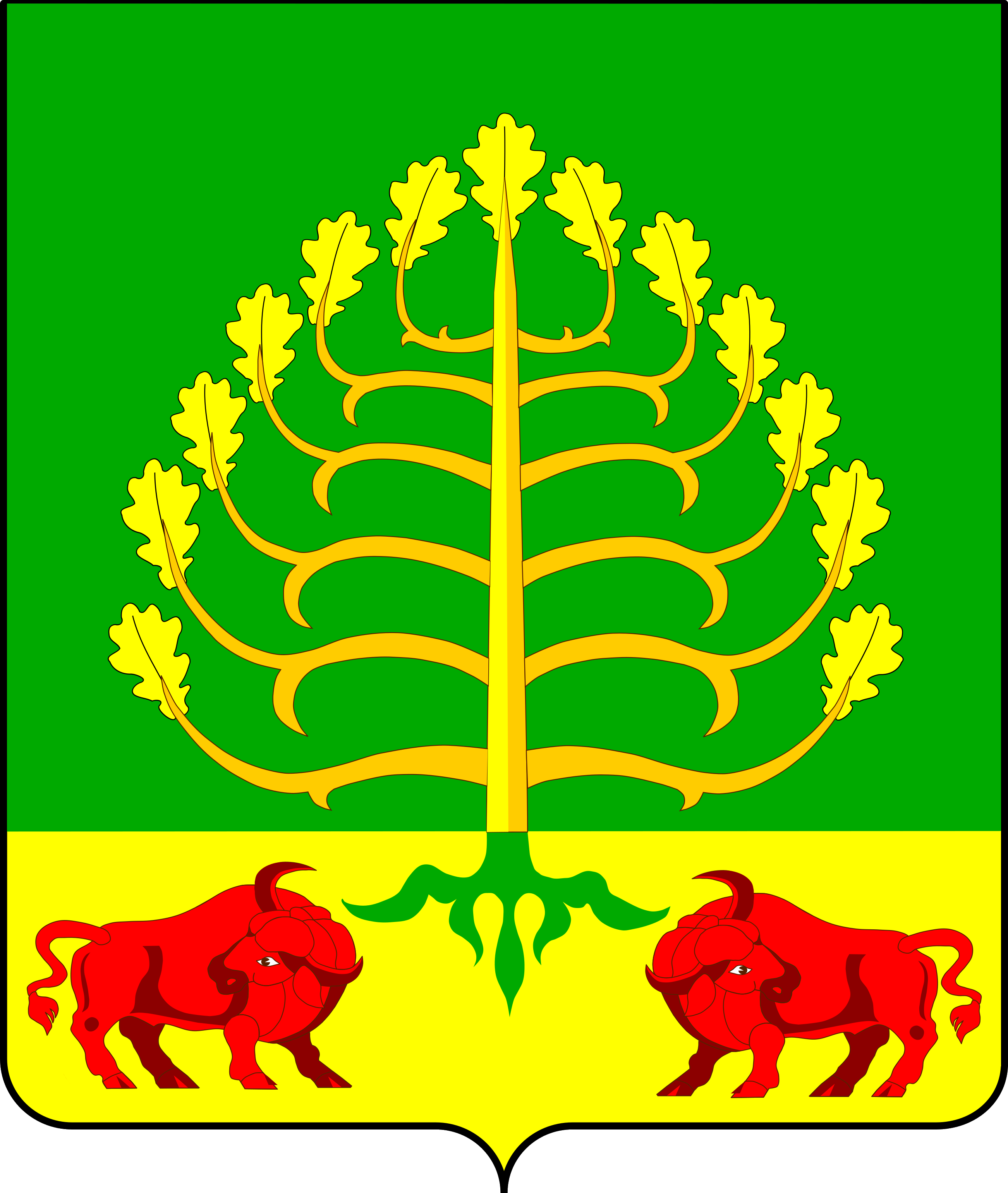
- Flag Coat of arms
- Interactive map of Adygeysk
- Location of Adygeysk Adygeysk (Republic of Adygea)
- Coordinates: 44°52′59.5″N 39°11′24.7″E
- Country: Russia
- Federal subject: Adygea
- Founded: 1969
- Elevation: 45 m (148 ft)

Population (2010 Census)
  - Total: 12,237
  - Estimate (2025): 13,247 (+8.3%)

Administrative status
  - Subordinated to: Adygeysk Republican Urban Okrug
  - Capital of: Adygeysk Republican Urban Okrug

Municipal status
  - Urban okrug: Adygeysk Urban Okrug
  - Capital of: Adygeysk Urban Okrug
- Time zone: UTC+3 (MSK)
- Postal codes: 385200, 385202
- OKTMO ID: 79703000001
- Website: www.adigeisk.ru

Adygeysk (Russian: Адыгейск; Adyghe: Адыгэкъалэ, romanized: Adıgəqalə) is a town in the Republic of Adygea, Russia, located near Krasnodar Reservoir, 100 kilometers (62 mi) northwest of Maykop, the capital of the republic. Population: 12,721 (2020), 12,237 (2010 census); 12,209 (2002 census);

It was previously known as Adygeysk(y) (until July 27, 1976),Teuchezhsk (until 1990).

== History ==
It was founded as the settlement of Adygeysky (Адыге́йский) in 1969 due to the construction of Krasnodar Reservoir. According to some other sources, the original name was "Adygeysk". The name alluded to the Adyghe people indigenous to the region. On July 27, 1976, it was granted town status and renamed Teuchezhsk (Теуче́жск), for Adyghe poet Tsug Teuchezh. In 1990, the original name was restored.

== Administrative and municipal status ==
Within the framework of administrative divisions, it is, together with two rural localities, incorporated as Adygeysk Republican Urban Okrug—an administrative unit with the status equal to that of the districts. It has the following rural localities under its jurisdiction:

- aul of Gatlukay
- khutor of Psekups

As a municipal division, Adygeysk Republican Urban Okrug is incorporated as Adygeysk Urban Okrug.
