= Maysky, Republic of Adygea =

Settlement in Adygea, Russia

Maysky Майский ЖъоныгъуакI
- Settlement
- Location within Republic of Adygea Location within Russia
- Coordinates: 44°46′N 40°32′E
- Country: Russia
- Region: Adygea
- District: Koshekhablsky District

Population (2018)
  - Total: 2,403
- Time zone: UTC+3:00

Maysky (Russian: Майский; Adyghe: ЖъоныгъуакI) is a rural locality (a settlement) and the administrative center of Mayskoye Rural Settlement of Koshekhablsky District, Adygea, Russia. The population was 2403 as of 2018. There are 14 streets.

== Geography ==
Maysky is located 16 km south of Koshekhabl (the district's administrative centre) by road. Krasny is the nearest rural locality.
