= Novoalexeyevsky, Republic of Adygea =

Khutor in Adygea, Russia

Novoalexeyevsky Новоалексеевский Алексеевскакӏэр
- Khutor
- Location within Republic of Adygea Location within Russia
- Coordinates: 44°55′N 40°22′E
- Country: Russia
- Region: Adygea
- District: Koshekhablsky District

Population (2018)
  - Total: 325
- Time zone: UTC+3:00

Novoalexeyevsky (Russian: Новоалексеевский; Adyghe: Алексеевскакӏэр) is a rural locality (a khutor) in Dmitriyevskoye Rural Settlement of Koshekhablsky District, Adygea, Russia. The population was 325 as of 2018. There are 7 streets.

== Geography ==
Novoalexeyevsky is located 13 km northwest of Koshekhabl (the district's administrative centre) by road. Plodopitomnik is the nearest rural locality.
