= Ryazanskaya (rural locality) =

Rural locality in Belorechensky District, Russia

Coordinates: 44°57′30″N 39°35′0″E

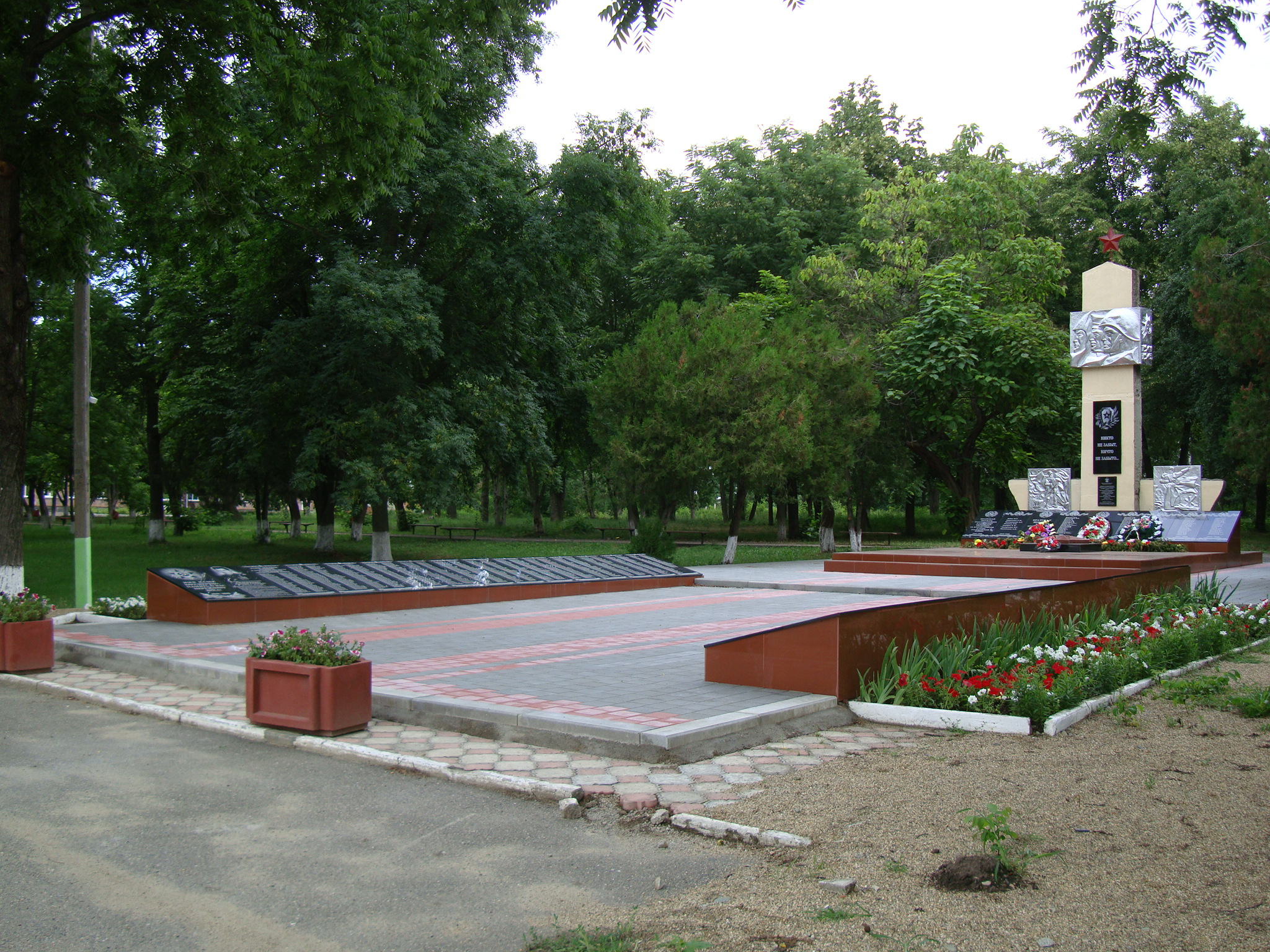

Ryazanskaya (Russian: Ряза́нская) is a rural locality (a stanitsa) in Belorechensky District of Krasnodar Krai, Russia, located on the right bank of the Pshish River, 33 kilometers (21 mi) northwest of Belorechensk. Population: 5,412 (2010 census); 5,091 (2002 census). Postal code: 352613.

It was founded in 1863 as the stanitsa of Gabukayevskaya (Габукаевская) and was renamed Ryazanskaya in 1867.

== Navy transmitter ==
Near Ryazanskaya is located a very large VLF-transmission facility of the Russian Navy, consisting of thirteen masts, one of which forms the middle of the central part and the rest are put up in two rings. The facility also has a heliport. It has a power supply over a 110 kV power line.
