= Adyghe State University =

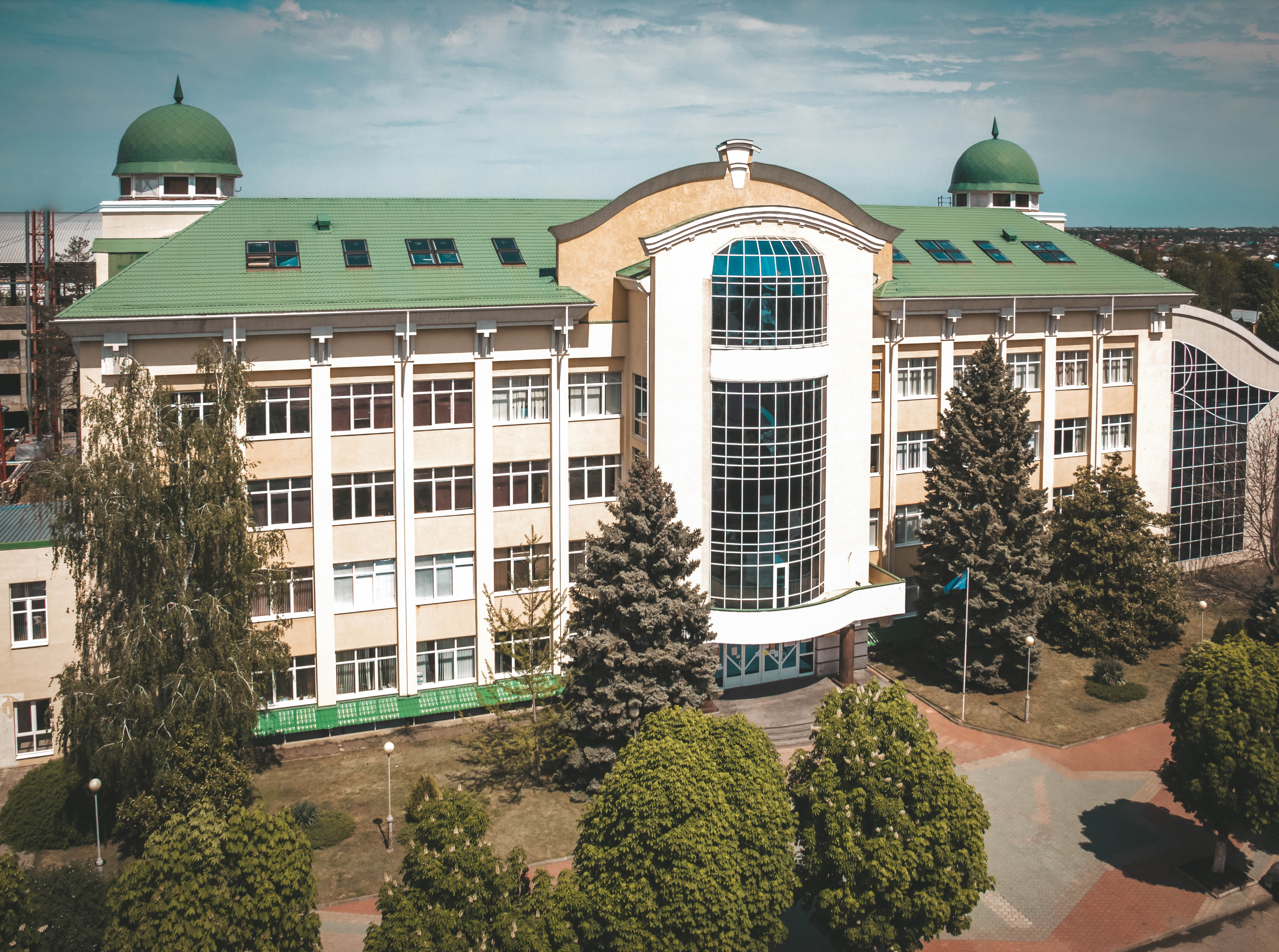
- Established: 1940
- Rector: Daud Mamiy (2023)
- Students: 12,000
- Postgraduates: 400
- Location: Maykop, Republic of Adygea, Russia; 44.6044°N 40.1101°E

Adyghe State University (Adyghe: Адыгэ Къэралыгъо Университет) is a higher education institution located in Maykop, the capital of the Republic of Adygea, Russia.

== History ==
The history of Adyghe State University began in 1940 with the opening of the Teachers' Institute in Maykop, which became the Adyghe Pedagogical Institute in 1952 and a state university in 1993. Currently, ASU is a leading educational and research center of the Republic of Adygea.

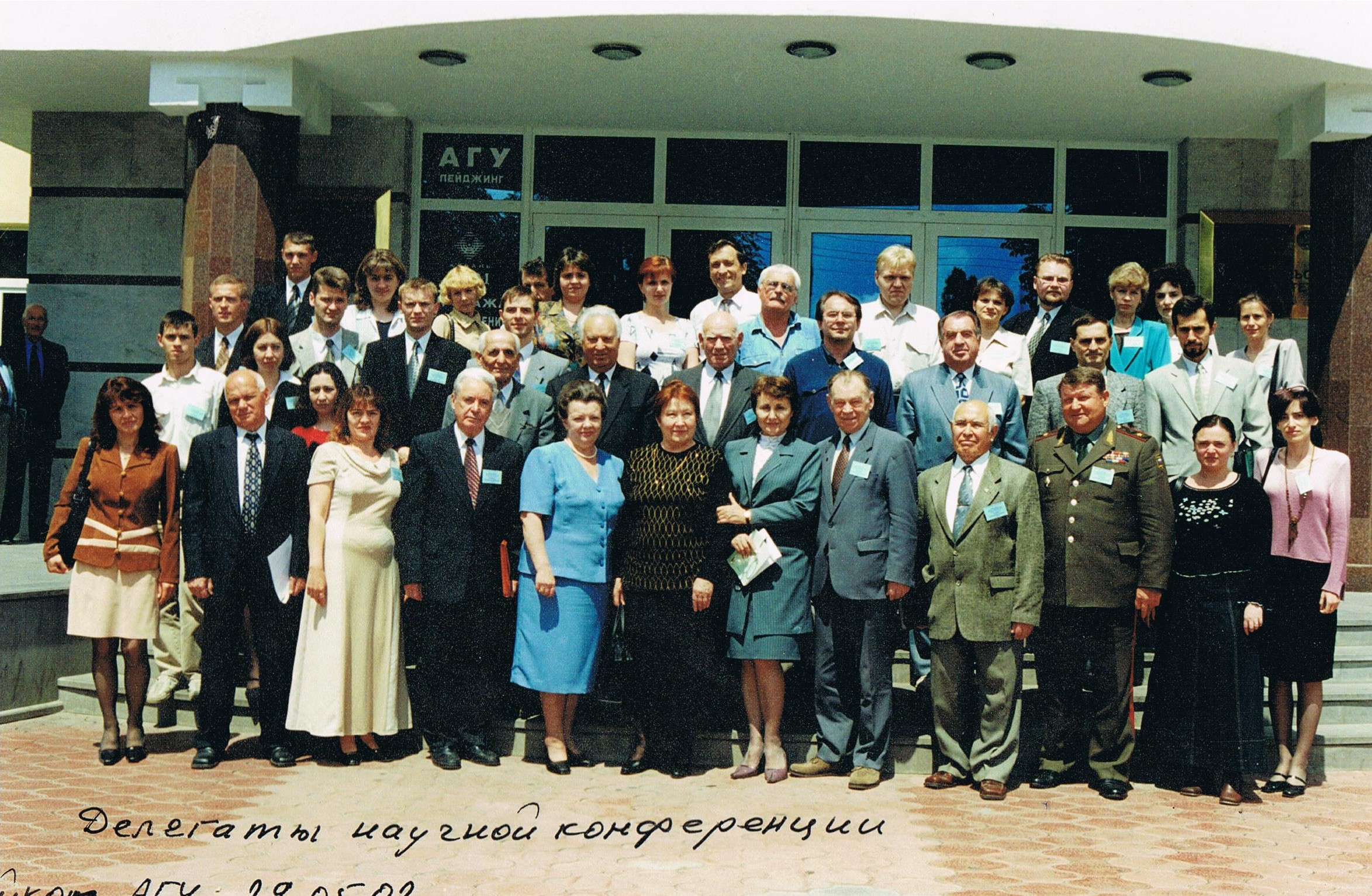
Academician R. G. Yanovsky and delegates of the scientific conference at ASU, Maykop, May 28, 2002. To his left, Admiral M. M. Tkhagapsov and General A. A. Dorofeev.

== Structure ==
- Institutes:
  - Institute of Arts
  - Institute of Physical Culture and Judo
  - Research Institute of Complex Problems
- Faculties:
  - Mathematics and Computer Science
  - Engineering Physics
  - Natural Sciences
  - History
  - Philology
  - Adyghe Philology and Culture
  - Foreign Languages
  - Law
  - Economics
  - Pedagogy
  - Social Technologies and Tourism
  - International

The university has branches in the cities of Apsheronsk, Belorechensk, Yeysk, Novokubansk, Sochi, and the rural locality of Koshekhabl. Adyghe State University is working to document Adyghe language and folklore in Turkey.

== Academics ==
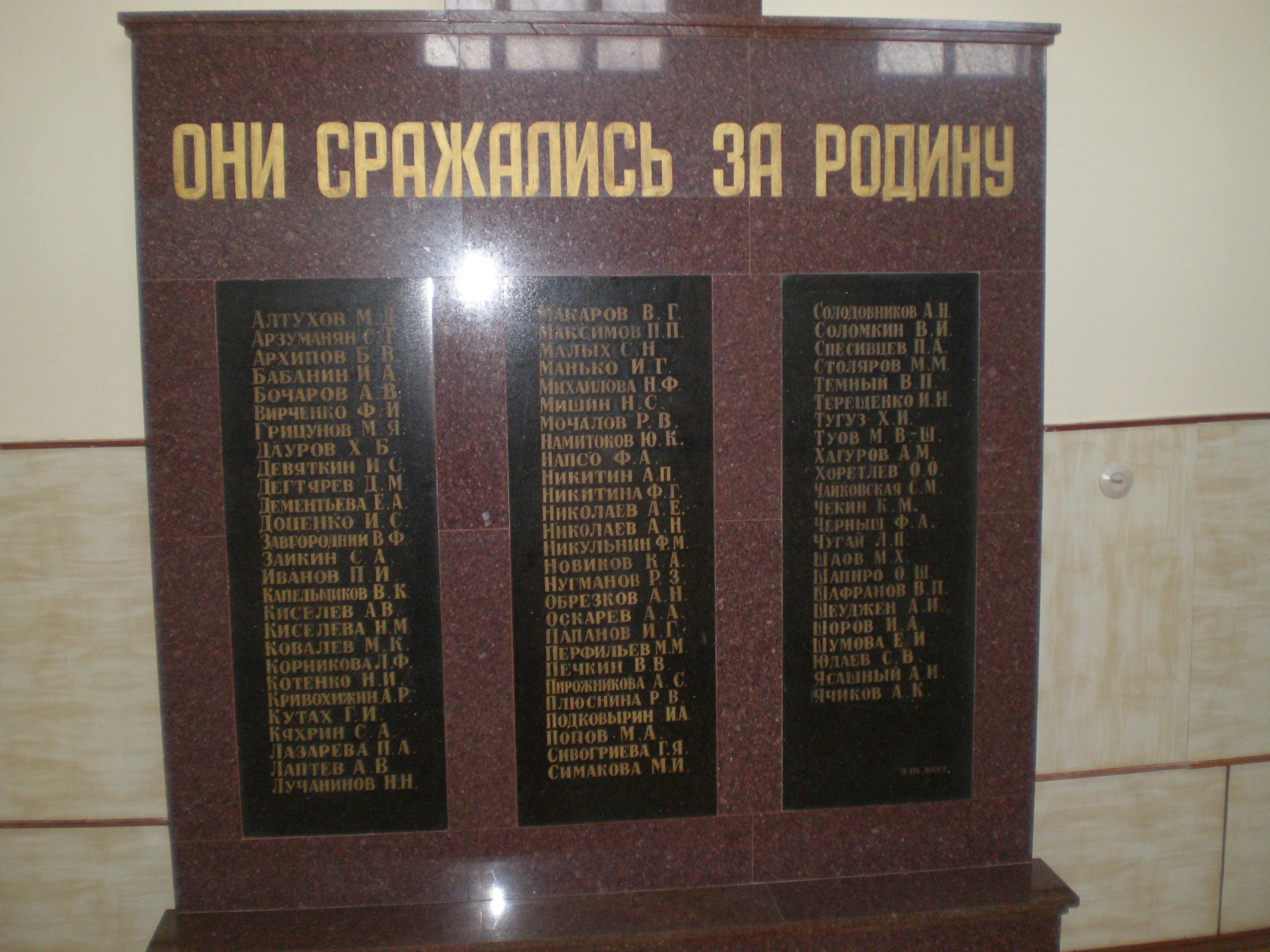
Memorial plaque at the university. Maykop, 2014.

The university provides training in 42 specialties of higher and secondary vocational education.

Approximately 12,000 students study at the university, including about 2,000 foreign students.

The teaching staff consists of around 650 people, of whom about 100 hold a Doctor of Sciences degree and around 400 hold a Candidate of Sciences degree.

== General information ==
The university is located at: Russia, 385000, Maykop, Pervomayskaya St., 208. The rector of the university is Daud Kazbekovich Mamiy.

== Rectors ==
Photo	Name (Russianised)	Name (Adyghe)	Term
	Alexander Yachikov Александр Ячиков	Yachequ Alexander ЯкIэкъу Александыр	1961–1985
	Kim Khutyz Ким Хутыз	Khut'izh Kim ХъутIыжъ Ким	1985–1996
	Rashid Khunagov Рашид Хунагов	Khunagu Rashid Хъунагу Рашид	1996–2019
	Daud Mamiy Дауд Мамий	Mamiy Dawud Мамый Дауд	2019–Present
