= Mayskoye, Belgorod Oblast =

Mayskoye Майское
- Selo
- Location within Belgorod Oblast Location within Russia
- Coordinates: 50°17′N 38°09′E
- Country: Russia
- Region: Belgorod Oblast
- District: Valuysky District
- Time zone: UTC+3:00

Mayskoye (Russian: Майское) is a rural locality (a selo) in Valuysky District, Belgorod Oblast, Russia. The population was 46 as of 2010. There is 1 street.

== Geography ==
Mayskoye is located 20 km north of Valuyki (the district's administrative centre) by road. Selivanovo is the nearest rural locality.
