= Gatlukay =

Rural locality in Adygea, Russia

Gatlukay Гатлукай Хьэлъэкъуай
- Aul
- Location within Republic of Adygea Location within Russia
- Coordinates: 44°53′N 39°14′E
- Country: Russia
- Region: Adygea
- Time zone: UTC+3:00

Gatlukay (Russian: Гатлукай; Adyghe: Хьэлъэкъуай) is a rural locality (an aul) in Adygeysk District of Adygea, Russia. The population was 1555 as of 2018. There are 15 streets.

== Geography ==
Gatlukay is located 6 km east of Adygeysk (the district's administrative centre) by road. Pchegatlukay is the nearest rural locality.

== Ethnicity ==
The aul is inhabited by Circassians.
