= Maysky, Vologodsky District, Vologda Oblast =

Maysky Майский
- Settlement
- Location within Vologda Oblast Location within Russia
- Coordinates: 59°15′N 39°44′E
- Country: Russia
- Region: Vologda Oblast
- District: Vologodsky District
- Time zone: UTC+3:00

Maysky (Russian: Майский) is a rural locality (a settlement) in Kubenskoye Rural Settlement, Vologodsky District, Vologda Oblast, Russia. The population was 2,353 as of 2002. There are 38 streets.
