= Boris Shelkovnikov =

Russian general (1837–1878)

Boris Martynovich Shelkovnikov Բեհբուտ Շելկովնիկով
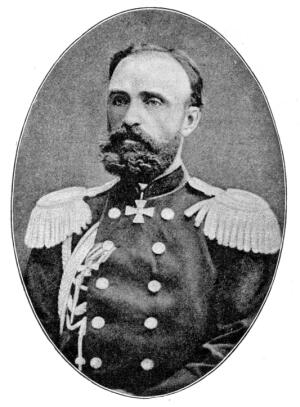
- Born: 1837; Nukha, Russian Empire
- Died: 10 February 1878 (aged 40–41); Erzerum, Russian Empire
- Burial place: Saint Gevorg Church, Tiflis
- Military career
- Allegiance: Russian Empire
- Branch: Imperial Russian Army
- Service years: 1855–1878
- Rank: Major General
- Commands: Black Sea Region
- Conflicts: Caucasian War; Crimean War; January Uprising; Russo-Turkish War
- Awards: Order of St. George; Order of St. Vladimir; Order of Saint Anna; Order of St. Stanislaus
- Other work: Governor of Erzurum

Boris Martynovich Shelkovnikov (Russian: Борис Мартынович Шелковников; 1837 – 10 February 1878), was a Russian general of the imperial army.

A descendant of an old Armenian noble house he was born in Nukha (modern-day Shaki, Azerbaijan). He participated in the Crimean War. In 1865 in the Northern Caucasus, and in 1876 he was appointed as the commander of the Black Sea region. During the Russo-Turkish War of 1877–1878 Shelkovnikov stopped Turkish forces in their attack on Sochi and took Abkhazia after defeating the forces of Ahmed Muhtar Pasha in a battle near Aladzhi. He was awarded the Order of Saint George of the third degree on 27 October 1877 for his victory in Aladzhi.

Shelkovnikov's division met up with General Ivan Davidovich Lazarev and together they marched on the Turkish line to take the province of Erzerum on 2 October. Erzerum was taken the next day, and Shelkovnikov was made governor of the province.

After the occupation by Russian troops Erzurum region was its governor. Actively and vigorously set about it in its duties, but soon contracted typhus and died 10 February 1878. His son, Alexander Begbutovich Shelkovnikov, was 8 years old at the time of his father's death.
