= Maysky, Romanovsky District, Altai Krai =

Maysky Майский
- Settlement
- Location within Altai Krai Location within Russia
- Coordinates: 52°46′N 81°21′E
- Country: Russia
- Region: Altai Krai
- District: Romanovsky District
- Time zone: UTC+7:00

Maysky (Russian: Майский) is a rural locality (a settlement) and the administrative center of Maysky Selsoviet, Romanovsky District, Altai Krai, Russia. The population was 446 as of 2013. There are 5 streets.

Maysky is part of Altai Krai, an important farming region in Russia located in the Siberian Federal District. The area has a cold continental climate, and its economy mainly depends on agriculture, livestock farming, and local rural services.

== Geography ==
Maysky is located 21 km north of Romanovo (the district's administrative centre) by road. Pamyat Kommunarov is the nearest rural locality.
