= Maysky, Vladimir Oblast =

Maysky Майский
- Settlement
- Location within Vladimir Oblast Location within Russia
- Coordinates: 56°25′N 38°52′E
- Country: Russia
- Region: Vladimir Oblast
- District: Alexandrovsky District
- Time zone: UTC+3:00

Maysky (Russian: Майский) is a rural locality (a settlement) in Andreyevskoye Rural Settlement, Alexandrovsky District, Vladimir Oblast, Russia. The population was 766 as of 2010. There are 9 streets.

== Geography ==
The village is located 12 km north-west from Andreyevskoye and 11 km north-east from Alexandrov.
