= Gabukay =

Gabukay Габукай (Russian) Гъобэкъуай (Adyghe)
- Aul
- Location within Republic of Adygea Location within Russia
- Coordinates: 44°55′N 39°33′E
- Country: Russia
- Region: Adygea
- District: Teuchezhsky District

Population (2021)
  - Total: 1,808
  - Estimate: 1,777
- Time zone: UTC+3:00

Gabukay (Russian: Габукай; Adyghe: Гъобэкъуай, romanized: Ǵobeqʷay) is a rural locality (an aul) and the administrative center of Gabukayskoye Rural Settlement of Teuchezhsky District, the Republic of Adygea, Russia. The population was estimated to be around 1,777 in 2024, a decrease from 1,811 in 2018. There are 17 streets.

== Geography ==
The aul is located on the left bank of the Pshish River, near the Ryazanskaya stanitsa, 20 km east of Ponezhukay (the district's administrative centre) by road. Ryazanskaya is the nearest rural locality.

== Demographics ==
The aul is predominantly inhabited by indigenous Circassians (Adyghes).
