= Maysky, Kursk Oblast =

Rural locality in Kursk Oblast, Russia

Maysky Майский
- Khutor
- Interactive map of Maysky
- Location of Maysky Maysky (Kursk Oblast)
- Coordinates: 51°58′23″N 35°56′28″E
- Country: Russia
- Federal subject: Kursk Oblast
- Administrative district: Fatezhsky District
- SelsovietSelsoviet: Bolshezhirovsky

Population (2010 Census)
  - Total: 60
  - Estimate (2010): 60 (0%)

Municipal status
  - Municipal district: Fatezhsky Municipal District
  - Rural settlement: Bolshezhirovsky Selsoviet Rural Settlement
- Time zone: UTC+3 (MSK)
- Postal code: 307116
- Dialing code: +7 47144
- OKTMO ID: 38644412131
- Website: мобольшежировский.рф

Maysky (Russian: Майский) is a rural locality (a khutor) in Bolshezhirovsky Selsoviet Rural Settlement, Fatezhsky District, Kursk Oblast, Russia. The population as of 2010 is 60.

== Geography ==
The khutor is located 100 km from the Russia–Ukraine border, 31 km north-west of Kursk, 13.5 km south-east of the district center – the town Fatezh, 2.5 km from the selsoviet center – Bolshoye Zhirovo.

=== Climate ===
Maysky has a warm-summer humid continental climate (Dfb in the Köppen climate classification).

== Transport ==
Maysky is located 0.5 km from the federal route M-2 Crimea Highway as part of the European route E105, 24.5 km from the road of regional importance 38K-018 (Kursk – Ponyri), 6 km from the road 38K-039 (Fatezh – 38K-018), 1 km from the road of intermunicipal significance 38H-221 (M2 "Crimea Highway" – Kromskaya), 26.5 km from the nearest railway halt Bukreyevka (railway line Oryol – Kursk).

The rural locality is situated 34 km from Kursk Vostochny Airport, 153 km from Belgorod International Airport and 227 km from Voronezh Peter the Great Airport.
