= Politotdel, Republic of Bashkortostan =

Politotdel Политотдел
- Selo
- Location within Bashkortostan Location within Russia
- Coordinates: 54°22′N 54°53′E
- Country: Russia
- Region: Bashkortostan
- District: Davlekanovsky District
- Time zone: UTC+5:00

Politotdel (Russian: Политотдел) is a rural locality (a selo) in Shestayevsky Selsoviet, Davlekanovsky District, Bashkortostan, Russia. The population was 191 as of 2010. There are 4 streets.

== Geography ==
Politotdel is located 26 km north of Davlekanovo (the district's administrative centre) by road. Shestayevo is the nearest rural locality.
