= Mayskoye mine =

- Location in Chukotka
- Location: Shelag Range, Chukotka Mountains, Chukotka Autonomous Okrug, Russia; 68.9825°N 173.7942°E
- Products: Gold

The Mayskoye mine is one of the largest gold mines in Russia and in the world. The mine is located in the Ichuveem Range, Chukotka Autonomous Okrug. As of 2013, the mine had estimated reserves of 7.2 million oz of gold.
