= Egerukhay =

Aul in Adygea, Russia

Egerukhay Егерухай Еджэрыкъуай
- Aul
- Location within Republic of Adygea Location within Russia
- Coordinates: 44°59′N 40°23′E
- Country: Russia
- Region: Adygea
- District: Koshekhablsky District

Population (2018)
  - Total: 1,635
- Time zone: UTC+3:00

Egerukhay (Russian: Егерухай; Adyghe: Еджэрыкъуай) is a rural locality (an aul) in Egerukhayskoye Rural Settlement of Koshekhablsky District, Adygea, Russia. The population of this aul was 1,635 as of 2018. There are 21 streets.

== Geography ==
The aul is located on the left bank of the Laba River, 20 km northwest of Koshekhabl (the district's administrative centre) by road. Luchezarny is the nearest rural locality.

== Ethnicity ==
The aul is inhabited by Adyghes or Circassians.
