= Maysky, Amur Oblast =

Maysky Майский
- Settlement
- Location within Amur Oblast Location within Russia
- Coordinates: 52°16′N 129°34′E
- Country: Russia
- Region: Amur Oblast
- District: Mazanovsky District
- Time zone: UTC+9:00

Maysky (Russian: Майский) is a rural locality (a settlement) in Maysky Selsoviet of Mazanovsky District, Amur Oblast, Russia. The population was 84 as of 2018. There are 3 streets.

== Geography ==
Maysky is located 10 km from the right bank of the Zeya River, 113 km northeast of Novokiyevsky Uval (the district's administrative centre) by road. Ivanovsky is the nearest rural locality.
