= Plodopitomnik, Amur Oblast =

Plodopitomnik Плодопитомник
- Settlement
- Location within Amur Oblast Location within Russia
- Coordinates: 50°18′N 127°29′E
- Country: Russia
- Region: Amur Oblast
- District: Blagoveshchensk Urban Okrug
- Time zone: UTC+9:00

Plodopitomnik (Russian: Плодопито́мник) is a rural locality (a settlement) in Blagoveshchensk Urban Okrug, Amur Oblast, Russia. The population was 1,081 as of 2018. There are 19 streets.

== Geography ==
The settlement is satellite town of Blagoveshchensk.
