= Maysky, Republic of Bashkortostan =

Maysky Майский
- Selo
- Location within Bashkortostan Location within Russia
- Coordinates: 54°51′N 57°03′E
- Country: Russia
- Region: Bashkortostan
- District: Iglinsky District
- Time zone: UTC+5:00

Maysky (Russian: Майский) is a rural locality (a selo) and the administrative centre of Maysky Selsoviet, Iglinsky District, Bashkortostan, Russia. The population was 356 as of 2010. There are 3 streets.

== Geography ==
Maysky is located 54 km east of Iglino (the district's administrative centre) by road. Rasmikeyevo is the nearest rural locality.
