= Maysky, Voronezh Oblast =

Maysky Майский
- Selo
- Location within Voronezh Oblast Location within Russia
- Coordinates: 51°36′N 39°59′E
- Country: Russia
- Region: Voronezh Oblast
- District: Paninsky District
- Time zone: UTC+3:00

Maysky (Russian: Майский) is a rural locality (a settlement) in Ivanovskoye Rural Settlement, Paninsky District, Voronezh Oblast, Russia. The population was 88 as of 2010. There are 2 streets.

== Geography ==
Maysky is located on the Pravaya Khava River, 11 km southwest of Panino (the district's administrative centre) by road. Katukhovskie Vyselki 2-ye is the nearest rural locality.
