= Alexander Begbutovich Shelkovnikov =

Russian botanist (1870–1933)

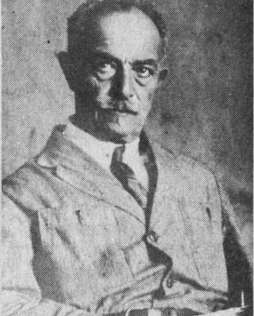
- Shelkovnikov in 1920
- Born: 17 March 1870
- Died: 19 May 1933 (aged 63)
- Other name: Alexandr Bebutovicz Schelkownikow
- Relatives: Boris Shelkovnikov (father)
- Scientific career
- Fields: Agriculture; Botany
- Author abbrev. (botany): Schelk.

Alexander Begbutovich Shelkovnikov (Александр Бегбутович Шелковников; March 17, 1870 – May 19, 1933) was a Russian zoologist, botanist, naturalist, and explorer of Transcaucasia.

== Biography ==
=== Early life and career ===
Shelkovnikov was son of General Boris Shelkovnikov (1837–1878). When his father died suddenly of typhus, Alexander was 8 years old.

In 1881, Alexander was accepted into the Page Corps in St. Petersburg, graduating in 1886. Already in 1892, he retired and settled in Transcaucasia in his estate Gek-tepe (near Yevlakh) in the Aresh uezd of the Elizavetpol Governorate. Until 1918, he was intensively engaged in farming, and at the same time conducted extensive research into the nature of Transcaucasia, collecting a large collection of fauna and flora of his native land.

=== Research expeditions ===
For twelve years (1904–1916), Shelkovnikov took part in botanical and zoological expeditions of the Caucasian Museum in Tiflis, sometimes as a research fellow, sometimes as a leader. Together with Jurij Nikolaewitch Woronow he edited and distributed herbarium specimens in the exsiccata Herbarium florae Caucasicae (1912-1916). His scientific trips took place in the Lenkoran uezd, in the Mughan, Mil and Shirvan steppes. He participated in large expeditions that covered the steppes in Turkmensky and Nogaysky in the North Caucasus, the upper Svaneti and western Мingrelia, the river valleys of the Kura and Aras, and Lake Sevan. He undertook a winter trip to Abkhazia.

In 1916, with funds from the Caucasian branch of the Russian Geographical Society, he organized a large Urmia expedition to Northern Persia (the vicinity of Lake Urmia). In addition to him, as the leader, the expedition was attended by geologist V. V. Bogachev, zoologist Nestor Alexandrovich Smirnov, and botanist Nikolai Schipczinsky.

=== Academic endeavors ===
In 1919, Shelkovnikov moved to Armenia, and in the spring of 1920 he was appointed an agronomist in Stepanavan. In the spring of 1922, Shelkovnikov, on behalf of the People's Commissariat for Education, created the Natural Science Museum at Yerevan University. In the same year (or, according to other sources, in 1925), with the sanction of the People's Commissariat for Agriculture, he created the Agricultural Museum and became its director. (The only employee was the preparator, later a famous ornithologist, G. V. Sosnin). In 1927, under the leadership of Shelkovnikov, the Botanical Garden was founded in Yerevan, which in 1930 was separated from the museum. A. B. Shelkovnikov remained the director of the museum.

In 1922, Shelkovnikov collected an herbarium representing the flora of Armenia, which later became part of the Institute of Botany of the Armenian National Academy of Sciences. For some time, he worked in the Ministry of Agriculture of Armenia. His collections, mainly zoological and botanical specimens from Georgia, Armenia and Azerbaijan, are stored in various cities of the former Soviet Union, in particular in Yerevan, St. Petersburg and Moscow.

=== Arrest and later life ===
In the early 1930s, A. B. Shelkovnikov was arrested for his adherence to the theoretical views of famous Russian agricultural economists Nikolai Kondratiev, Alexander Chayanov, Alexander Nikolaevich Chelintsev, and was accused of belonging to the Armenian branch of the Labor Peasant Party. He was arrested on similar charges along with many other specialists in the Armenian national economy. After almost a year in the Tiflis prison, Shelkovnikov was released to Yerevan, where he soon died of a heart attack on May 19, 1933.

== Eponyms ==
More than 30 species of plants have been named in his honor, as well as about 20 species of invertebrates. This includes:

- Schelkovnikov's pine vole (Microtus schelkovnikovi)
- Shelkovnikov's water squirrel (Neomys schelkovnikovi)

== Selected publications ==
- Шелковников А. Б. Nelumbo nucifera Geartn. в разливах Аракса на Мугани. Изв. Кавк. музея, IV, 1908.
- Шелковников, А. Б. Поездка в Зувант в Июле 1908 года. С дарственной надписью автора. Тифлис. Типография Канцелярии Наместника Его Императорского Величества. 1910 г. 46с.
- Шелковников, А. Б. Заметки о гадах Арешского уезда Елисаветпольской губ. - Тифлис: Тип. Канцелярии наместника е. и. в. на Кавказе, 1911. - 26 с.; - Отт. из "Изв. Кавк. музея". Т. 5.
- Шелковников, А. Б. Поездка в Сванетию летом 1911 г. - Тифлис : тип. Канцелярии наместника е. и. вел. на Кавказе, 1913. - 84 с.
- Шелковников, А. Б. Севанская ботаническая экспедиция 1927 года (краткий очерк) // Бюллетень Бюро гидрометеорологических исследований на озере Севан (Гокча). Ереван, 1927, No. 1/3, с. 16–21.
- Шелковников, А. Б. Заметки о новейших фаунистических и флористических находках в Армении. - В книге: Закавказский краеведческий сборник. Серия А. Естествознание. 1. Тифлис, 1930, с. 142–144.
- Шелковников А. Б. 1930. Уголок сухих субтропиков Закавказья // Тр. прикл. бот., генет. и сел., XII, 5: 625–635.
- Шелковников, А. Б. Материалы по орнитофауне озера Севан // Труды Зоологического сектора. Грузинского отделения Закавказского филиала Академии наук СССР. Тбилиси, 1934, т. 1, с. 144–163.
