= Shirah Ki =

Shirah Ki شيره كي
- Village
- Location within Iran
- Coordinates: 38°21′20″N 44°47′46″E
- Country: Iran
- Province: West Azerbaijan
- County: Salmas
- Bakhsh: Central
- Rural District: Koreh Soni

Population (2006)
  - Total: 542
- Time zone: UTC+3:30 (IRST)
  - Summer (DST): UTC+4:30 (IRDT)

Shirah Ki (Persian: شيره كي, also Romanized as Shīrah Kī; also known as Shīrakī) is a village in Koreh Soni Rural District, in the Central District of Salmas County, West Azerbaijan Province, Iran. At the 2006 census, its population was 542, in 101 families.
