= Yury Voronov (botanist) =

Russian botanist

Yury Nikolaevitch Voronov (Юрий Николаевич Воронов; 1 June 1874 in Tiflis – 10 December 1931 in Leningrad) was a Russian botanist. He worked at the Botanical Garden in Leningrad.

Alternative transcriptions of his name into the Latin alphabet include Jurij Nikolaewitch Woronow, as seen at the International Plant Names Index database.

Between 1907 and 1919, he published Opredelitel rastenij Kavkaza i Kryma (1907-1919) with Aleksandr Vasiljevich Fomin, about plant species in the Caucasus. Voronov (Woronow) co-edited and published two exsiccatae: Flora Caucasica exsiccata (1905-1911) with Nikolai Adolfowitsch Busch and Vasilij Vasilievich Marcowicz and Herbarium florae Caucasicae (1912-1916) with Aleksandr Begbutowitsch Schelkownikow.

== Notes ==
- "Yury Nikolayevich Voronov (1 June 1874 – 10 December 1931)". Cybertruffle's Fungal Valhalla. Cybertruffle.
- Robert Zander (1984), Handwörterbuch der Pflanzennamen (in German) (13. ed.), Stuttgart: Ulmer, ISBN 3-8001-5042-5
- Sergej Juĺevič Lipšic, ed. (1947), Russkie botaniki. Biografo-bibliografičeskij slovaŕ (in German), vol. Band II, Moskva: Izdateĺstvo Moskovskogo Obščestva ispytatelej prirody, pp. 178–183
