= Koshekhablsky District =

Koshekhablsky District Кошехабльский район (Russian)
- District

Other transcription(s)
  - Adyghe: Кощхьаблэ къедзыгъо
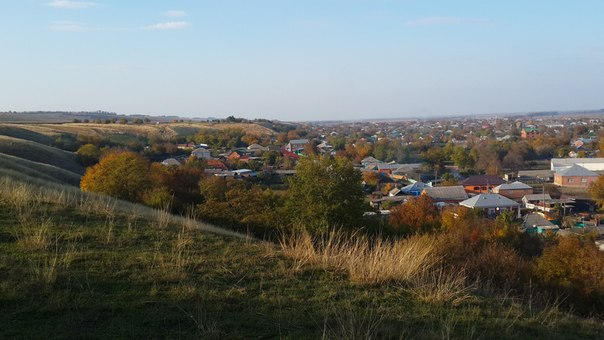
- Aul Xodz

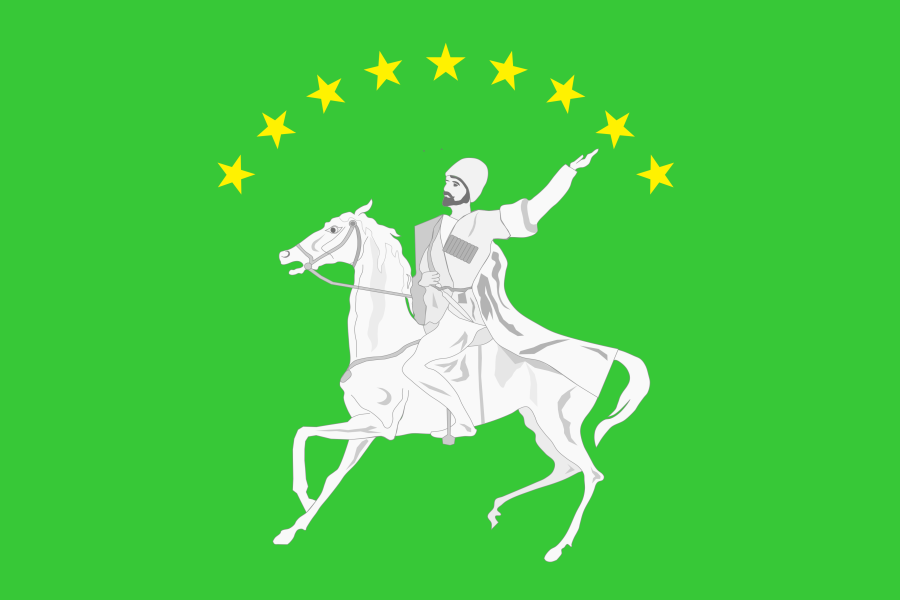
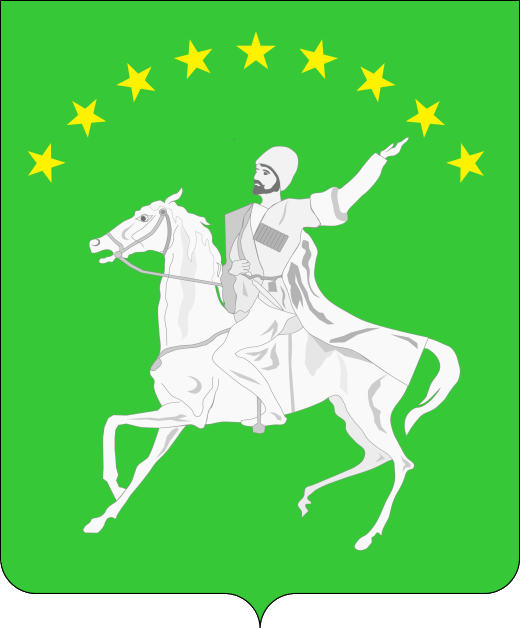
- Flag Coat of arms
- Location of Koshekhablsky District in the Republic of Adygea
- Coordinates: 44°54′N 40°29′E
- Country: Russia
- Federal subject: Republic of Adygea
- Established: December 31, 1934 (first), January 12, 1965 (second)
- Administrative center: Koshekhabl

Government
  - Type: Local government
  - Head of Administration: Hamirzov Zaur Askarbievich

Area
  - Total: 606.7 km^{2} (234.2 sq mi)

Population (2010 Census)
  - Total: 30,422
  - Density: 50.14/km^{2} (129.9/sq mi)
  - Urban: 0%
  - Rural: 100%

Administrative structure
  - Inhabited localities: 24 rural localities

Municipal structure
  - Municipally incorporated as: Koshekhablsky Municipal District
  - Municipal divisions: 0 urban settlements, 9 rural settlements
- Time zone: UTC+3 (MSK)
- OKTMO ID: 79615000
- Website: http://www.admin-koshehabl.ru

Population of Koshekhablsky District
- 2010 Census: 30,422
- 2002 Census: 31,296
- 1989 Census: 29,766
- 1979 Census: 30,654

Koshekhablsky District (Russian: Кошеха́бльский райо́н; Adyghe: Кощхьэблэ къедзыгъо) is an administrative and a municipal district (raion), one of the seven in the Republic of Adygea, Russia. It is located in the east of the republic and borders with Kurganinsky District of Krasnodar Krai in the north and northeast, Labinsky District of Krasnodar Krai in the east, Mostovsky District of Krasnodar Krai in the south, Giaginsky District in the west, and with Shovgenovsky District in the northwest. The area of the district is 606.7 square kilometers (234.2 sq mi). Its administrative center is the rural locality (an aul) of Koshekhabl. As of the 2010 Census, the total population of the district was 30,422, with the population of Koshekhabl accounting for 23.8% of that number.

== Etymology ==
The name "Koshekhablsky" is derived from the Circassian words "Kosho" (a Shapsug family name) and "Habl" (meaning neighborhood).

== History ==
Koshekhablsky District was established within Azov-Black Sea Krai on December 31, 1934 as a result of the downsizing of the krai's districts. On December 7, 1956, the district was enlarged as portions of abolished Shovgenovsky District were merged into it. However, as the enlargement policy did not prove effective, the district was restored in its previous borders on March 21, 1958. On February 1, 1963, Koshekhablsky District was abolished and merged into newly created Shovgenovsky Rural District. As the new system of rural districts turned out to be inefficient as well, Koshekhablsky District was re-instated in its pre-1963 borders on January 12, 1965.

== Administrative and municipal status ==
Within the framework of administrative divisions, Koshekhablsky District is one of the seven in the Republic of Adygea and has administrative jurisdiction over all of its twenty-four rural localities. As a municipal division, the district is incorporated as Koshekhablsky Municipal District. Its twenty-four rural localities are incorporated into nine rural settlements within the municipal district. The aul of Koshekhabl serves as the administrative center of both the administrative and municipal district.

=== Municipal composition ===
1. Blechepsinskoye Rural Settlement (Блечепсинское)
  Administrative center: aul of Blechepsin
2. Dmitriyevskoye Rural Settlement (Дмитриевское)
  Administrative center: settlement of Druzhba
  other localities of the rural settlement:
  - settlement of Chekhrak, Dmitriyevskoye Rural Settlement
  - khutor of Dmitriyevsky
  - aul of Khachemziy
  - settlement of Komsomolsky
  - khutor of Krasny Fars
  - khutor of Novoalexeyevsky
  - khutor of Otradny
  - settlement of Plodopitomnik
  - khutor of Politotdel
3. Ignatyevskoye Rural Settlement (Игнатьевское)
  Administrative center: khutor of Ignatyevsky
4. Khodzinskoye Rural Settlement (Ходзинское)
  Administrative center: aul of Khodz
5. Koshekhablskoye Rural Settlement (Кошехабльское)
  Administrative center: aul of Koshekhabl
6. Mayskoye Rural Settlement (Майское)
  Administrative center: settlement of Maysky
  other localities of the rural settlement:
  - khutor of Chekhrak, Mayskoye Rural Settlement
  - khutor of Krasny
7. Natyrbovskoye Rural Settlement (Натырбовское)
  Administrative center: selo of Natyrbovo
  other localities of the rural settlement:
  - khutor of Kazyonno-Kuzhorsky
8. Volnenskoye Rural Settlement (Вольненское)
  Administrative center: selo of Volnoye
  other localities of the rural settlement:
  - khutor of Karmolino-Gidroitsky
  - khutor of Shelkovnikov
9. Egerukhayskoye Rural Settlement (Егерухайское)
  Administrative center: aul of Egerukhay
  other localities of the rural settlement:
  - khutor of Sokolov
