= Koshekhabl =

Rural locality in Koshekhablsky, Adygea, Russia

Koshekhabl Кошехабль (Russian) Кощхьэблэ (Adyghe)
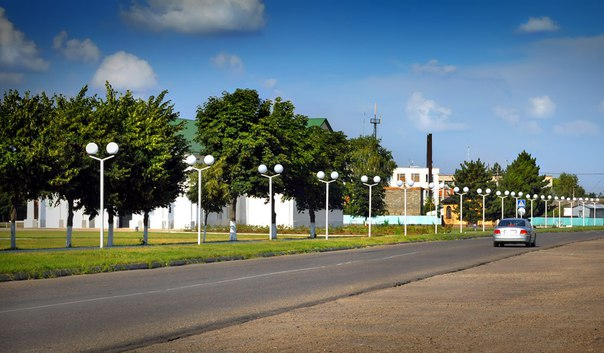

- Location within Republic of Adygea Location within European Russia
- Coordinates: 44°54′N 40°28′E

Population (2010)
  - Total: 7,239

Koshekhabl (Russian: Кошеха́бль; Adyghe: Кощхьэблэ, romanized: Kośḩeble; Adyghe pronunciation: [kʷaɕħabla]) is a rural locality (an aul) and the administrative center of Koshekhablsky District of the Republic of Adygea, Russia, located on the Bolshaya Laba River (Kuban's tributary), some 70 kilometers (43 mi) northeast of Maykop.

Population: 7,308 (2021 census); 7,239 (2010 census); 7,309 (2002 census); 6,935 (1989 Soviet census).

The name "Koshekhabl" is derived from the Circassian words Кощ, Koś (a Shapsug family name) and хьабл, habl (meaning neighborhood).

A branch of the Adyghe State University operates in Koshekhabl.
