= Kuban =

Geographic region of southern Russia

Coordinates: 45°2′N 38°58′E

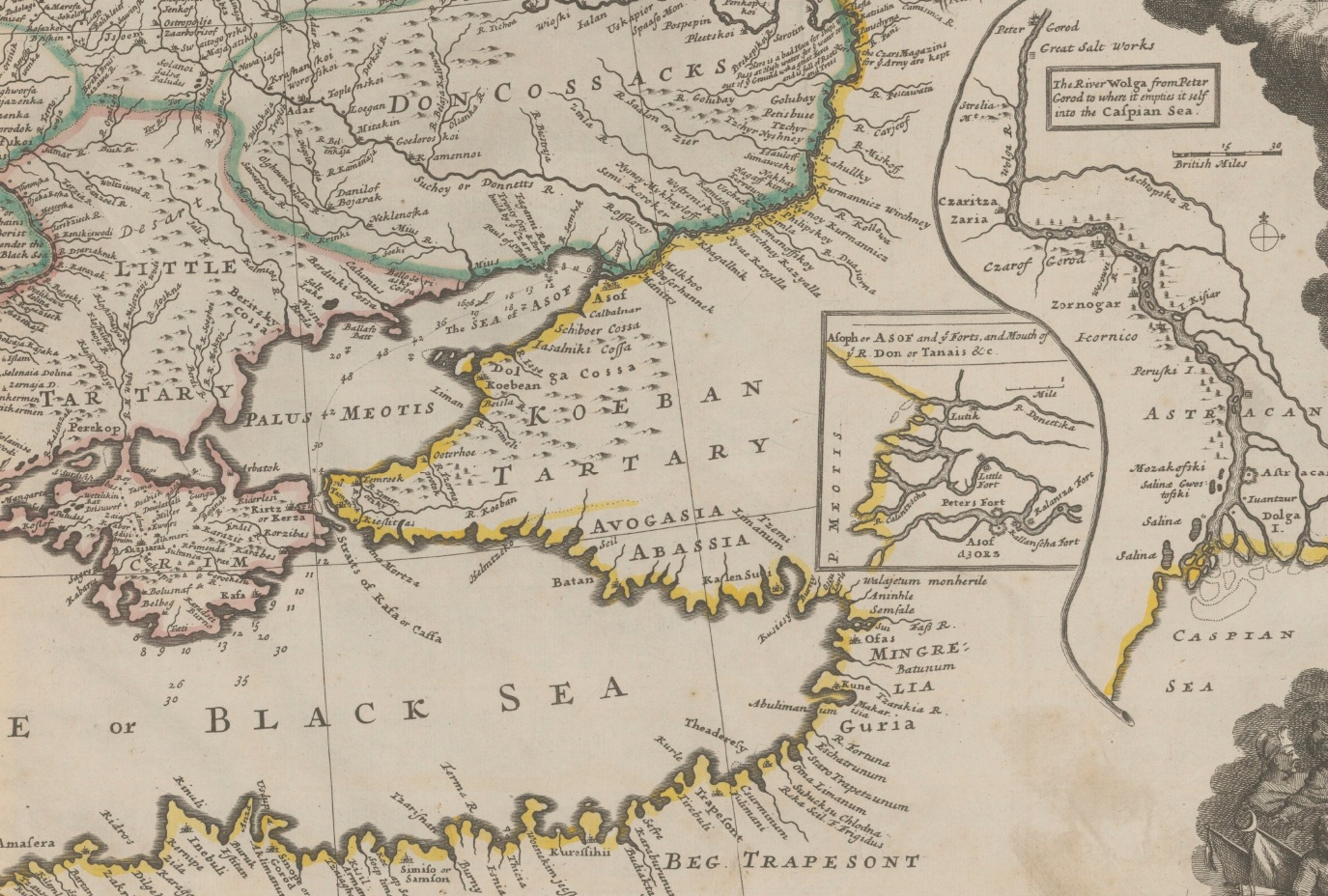
Kuban Tartary and surroundings around 1700, Herman Moll

Map of Kuban Oblast in 1900

Federal subjects in the Black Sea-Caspian area. Smaller areas along the north Caucasus are the republics: Karachay-Cherkessia, Kabardino-Balkaria, North Ossetia-Alania, Ingushetia, and Chechnya
Southern Federal District
North Caucasus Federal District (southern area only; grey areas to the north are parts of the Volga and Central Federal Districts)

Kuban (Russian and Ukrainian: Кубань; Adyghe: Пшызэ; Kabardian: Псыжь; Karachay-Balkar: Къобан; Nogai: Кобан; Abaza: Къвбина) is a historical and geographical region in the North Caucasus region of southern Russia surrounding the Kuban River, on the Black Sea between the Don Steppe, the Volga Delta and separated from the Crimean Peninsula to the west by the Kerch Strait. Krasnodar Krai is often referred to as Kuban, both officially and unofficially, although the term is not exclusive to the krai and also accommodates the republics of Adygea, Karachay-Cherkessia, and parts of Stavropol Krai.

== Lesser Nogai Horde ==
The Lesser Nogai Horde was the Nogai Tatar territory in Kuban, allied with the Crimean Khanate.

== Cossack settlement ==
The Cossack settlement of Kuban and of the adjacent Black Sea region occurred gradually for over a century, and was heavily influenced by the outcomes of the conflicts between Russia and Ottoman Empire. In the mid-18th century, the area was predominantly inhabited by the Adyghe tribes. After the Russo-Turkish War of 1768–1774, the population of the area started to show more pro-Russian tendencies.

In order to stop Turkish ambitions to use Kuban region to facilitate the return of the Crimea, Russia started to establish a network of fortifications along the Kuban River in the 1770s. After the Russian annexation of Crimea, right-bank Kuban, and Taman in 1783, the Kuban River became the border of the Russian Empire. New fortresses were built on the Kuban in the 1780s–1790s.

Until the 1790s, these fortresses and the abandoned Cossack settlements on the Laba River and in Taman remained the only indication of Russian presence in the area. More intensive settlement started in 1792–1794, when Black Sea Cossack Host (created in 1787 in southern Ukraine from former Zaporozhian Cossacks) and Don Cossacks were re-settled to this area by the Russian government in order to strengthen the southern borders.

At the end of the 18th and the beginning of the 19th centuries, the right bank of the Kuban River was settled. At the same time, first settlements appear on the coast of the Black Sea and on the plain between the Kuban and Bolshaya Laba Rivers. During the second half of the 19th century, the settlement rate intensified, and the territory was administratively organized into Kuban Oblast and Black Sea Okrug (which later became Black Sea Governorate).

The location of the territory along the border had a significant effect on its administrative division, which incorporated the elements of civil and military governments.

== See also ==
- Circassia
- Circassian genocide
- Cossacks of the Kuban
- FC Kuban Krasnodar
- Kuban-Black Sea Soviet Republic
- Kuban bridgehead
- Kuban Cossacks
- Kuban Offensive
- Kuban People's Republic
- Kuban Soviet Republic
- PBC Lokomotiv-Kuban
- Ukrainians in Kuban

== General and cited references ==
- Азаренкова [Azarenkova], А. С.; Бондарь [Bondar], И. Ю.; Вертышева [Vertysheva], Н. С. (1986). Основные административно-территориальные преобразования на Кубани (1793–1985 гг.) [The main administrative and territorial changes in the Kuban region (1793–1985 biennium)] (in Russian). Краснодарское книжное издательство [Krasnodar Publishing House]. Archived from the original on 8 December 2015.
