= Adygea (disambiguation) =

Adygea may refer to:

- Republic of Adygea, a federal subject of Russia
- Adyghe Autonomous Oblast (1922–1991), an administrative division of the Russian SFSR, Soviet Union
- Adygea Airlines, a defunct state-owned airline in the Republic of Adygea which operated in 1997–2009

== See also ==
- Adygeya
- Adygeysk
