= Kostroma (disambiguation) =

Kostroma is a city in Russia.

Kostroma may also refer to:

- Kostroma (deity), a Slavic goddess
- Kostroma (cattle), a Russian cattle breed
- Kostroma (horse), a thoroughbred racehorse
- Kostroma Oblast, a federal subject of Russia
- Kostroma (river), a river in Kostroma and Yaroslavl Oblasts, Russia
- Kostroma (inhabited locality), a list of inhabited localities in Russia
- Kostroma Airport, an airport in Kostroma, Russia
- Russian submarine Kostroma (B-276), a Sierra-class submarine

== See also ==
- Kostromskoy (disambiguation)
