= Psefir =

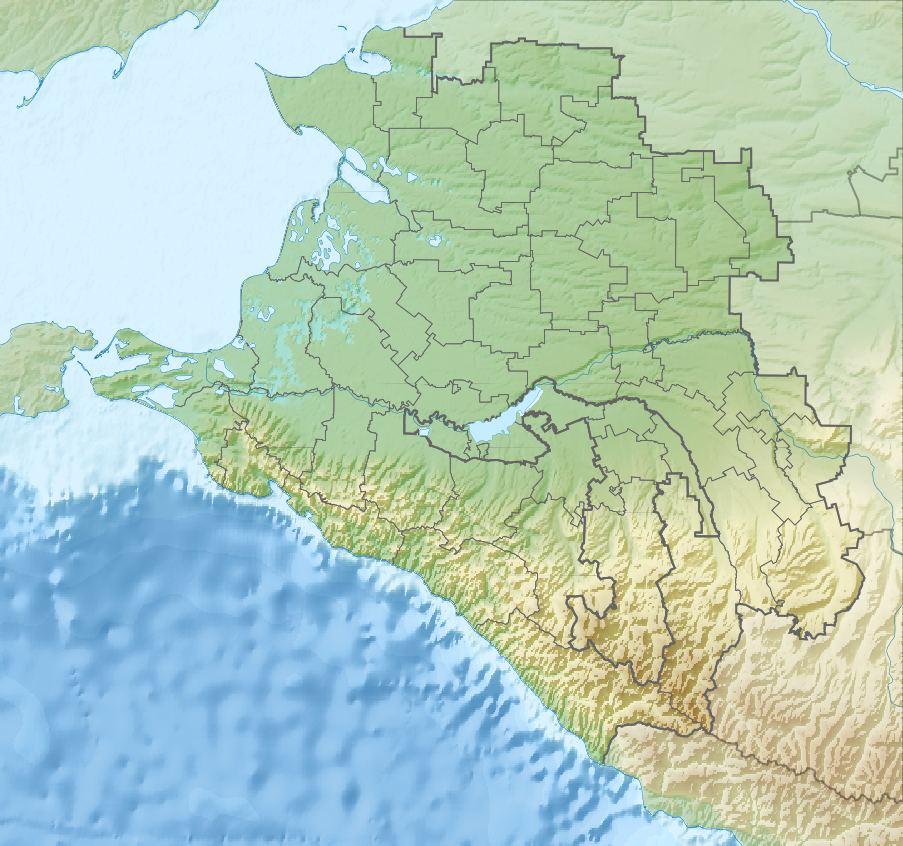
- Location within Krasnodar Krai Location within Caucasus Mountains Location within European Russia

Physical characteristics
- Mouth: Fars
  - coordinates: 44°36′17″N 40°28′31″E
- Length: 67 km (42 mi)
- Basin size: 378 km^{2} (146 sq mi)

Basin features
- Progression: Fars→ Laba→ Kuban→ Sea of Azov

The Psefir (Russian: Псефирь) is a river in Krasnodar Krai, Russia, which flows into the Fars. It is 67 kilometres (42 mi) long, and has a drainage basin of 378 square kilometres (146 sq mi). The area around the river is populated by various Abadzekh and Circassian tribes. The stanitsa of Kostromskaya stands on the river.
