= Shapsug Reservoir =

Reservoir in Adygea, Russia

Coordinates: 44°59′42″N 38°48′22″E

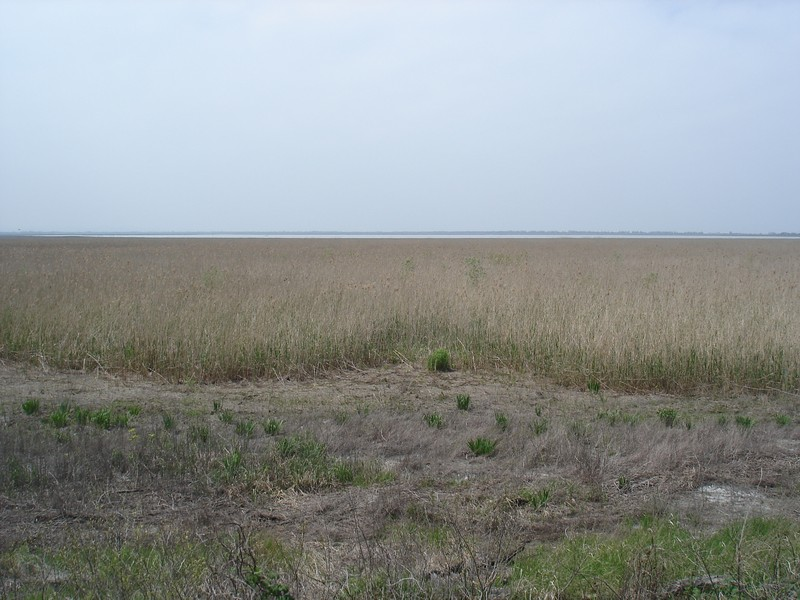
Shapsug Reservoir in the distance

The Shapsug Reservoir, also known as the Shapsugskoye Reservoir (Russian: Шапсу́гское водохрани́лище) is a deactivated reservoir in Takhtamukaysky District of the Republic of Adygea, Russia, located 3 kilometers (1.9 mi) southwest of Krasnodar.

It was built between 1940 and 1952 on the left bank of the Kuban River valley, at the mouth of the Afips River as a part of rice irrigation system and was important to the economy of Krasnodar Krai of Russia. It was named after the Shapsugs—a tribe which has inhabited the area for thousands of years—and is considered a part of historical Shapsugia, which was a part of historical Circassia. With the area of 46 square kilometers (18 sq mi), the reservoir has a rounded shape, with the length of 9 kilometers (5.6 mi), the width of 8 kilometers (5.0 mi), and an average depth of 3.5 meters (11 ft). In the southeast there is a small bay. Together with Tshchik Reservoir, they have a combined capacity of 520,000,000 cubic meters (1.8×10^{10} cu ft), which made it one of the largest irrigation schemes in the northern part of the Caucasus. The flood water from the reservoir is actively used for crop irrigation. The bottom is subject to severe siltation, and due to pesticides and fertilizers discharged from rice farming, fish kills have occurred in the reservoir, and also in the Krasnodar and Kryukov Reservoirs.

In 2007, reconstruction of the reservoir was started. The cost of the project on reconstruction was estimated at 1.8 billion rubles, but later rose to 2.4 billion. The reconstruction was scheduled to be completed in 2015, two years later than initially scheduled.
