= Chokhrak =

River in Russia

- Location within Republic of Adygea Location within European Russia

Physical characteristics
- Mouth: Laba
  - coordinates: 45.0547°N 40.2946°E
- Length: 84 km (52 mi)
- Basin size: 601 km^{2} (232 sq mi)

Basin features
- Progression: Laba→ Kuban→ Sea of Azov

The Chokhrak (Russian: Чохрак) is a river of southwest Russia, a left tributary of the Laba. It flows through the Republic of Adygea. It is 84 kilometres (52 mi) long, and has a drainage basin of 601 square kilometres (232 sq mi).
