= Kisha (river) =

River in the Caucasus region

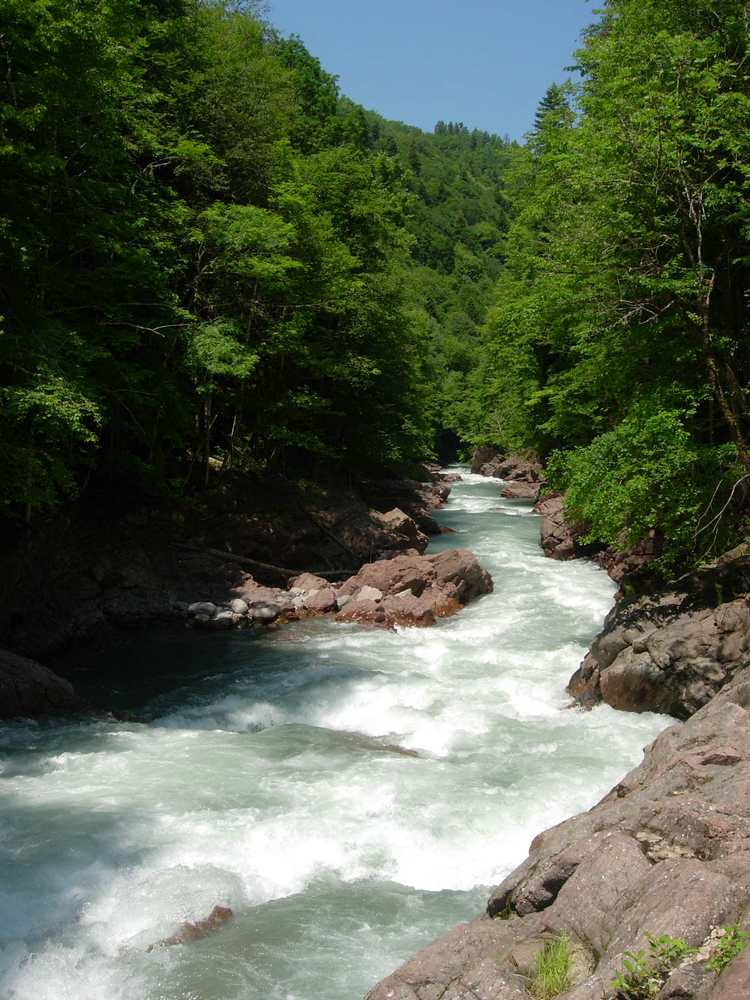

- Location within Republic of Adygea Location within Caucasus Mountains Location within European Russia

Physical characteristics
- Mouth: Belaya
  - coordinates: 44°03′29″N 40°10′20″E
- Length: 52 km (32 mi)
- Basin size: 499 km^{2} (193 sq mi)

Basin features
- Progression: Belaya→ Kuban→ Sea of Azov

The Kisha (Russian: Киша) is a right tributary of the river Belaya in southwest Russia. It is fed by the glaciers of the Chugush mountain and flows for 52 km through the Republic of Adygea. It is 52 kilometres (32 mi) long, and has a drainage basin of 499 square kilometres (193 sq mi).
