= Adygea Airlines =

National airline of the republic of Adygea, in Russia

Adygea Airlines Авиалинии Адыгеи
IATA	ICAO	Call sign
—	RDD	ADLINES
- Operating bases: Maykop Airport
- Headquarters: Maykop, Adygea
- Key people: Pedchenko Alexander Pavlovich (General Director)

Adygea Airlines (Russian: Авиалинии Адыгеи, romanized: Avialinii Adygei) was the state-owned national airline of the republic of Adygea, in Russia. The company was founded in 1997 and liquidated at the end of 2009.

== Liquidation ==
In 2008 the airline went into liquidation while the government sought an investor. Aeroflot showed interest but did not take the airline over. There was an initial attempt to sell off all assets to one buyer (at a value of 61.9 million Roubles in November 2009) but this was then divided into different lots - the airport (starting price of 21 million Roubles), aircraft maintenance base (16 million Roubles), oil base (6 million Roubles) and the aircraft each individually priced.

== Fleet ==
The fleet was sold off as part of the liquidation process (as of December 2009) and included:

Aircraft	In fleet	Seats	Notes
Antonov An-2	34	12	
Antonov An-24RV	5		
Antonov An-26	1		

The first nine planes to be sold off raised a total of 4.16 million Roubles while the price of the Antonovs sold varied between 400,000 and 660,000 Roubles each.
