= Khodz (river) =

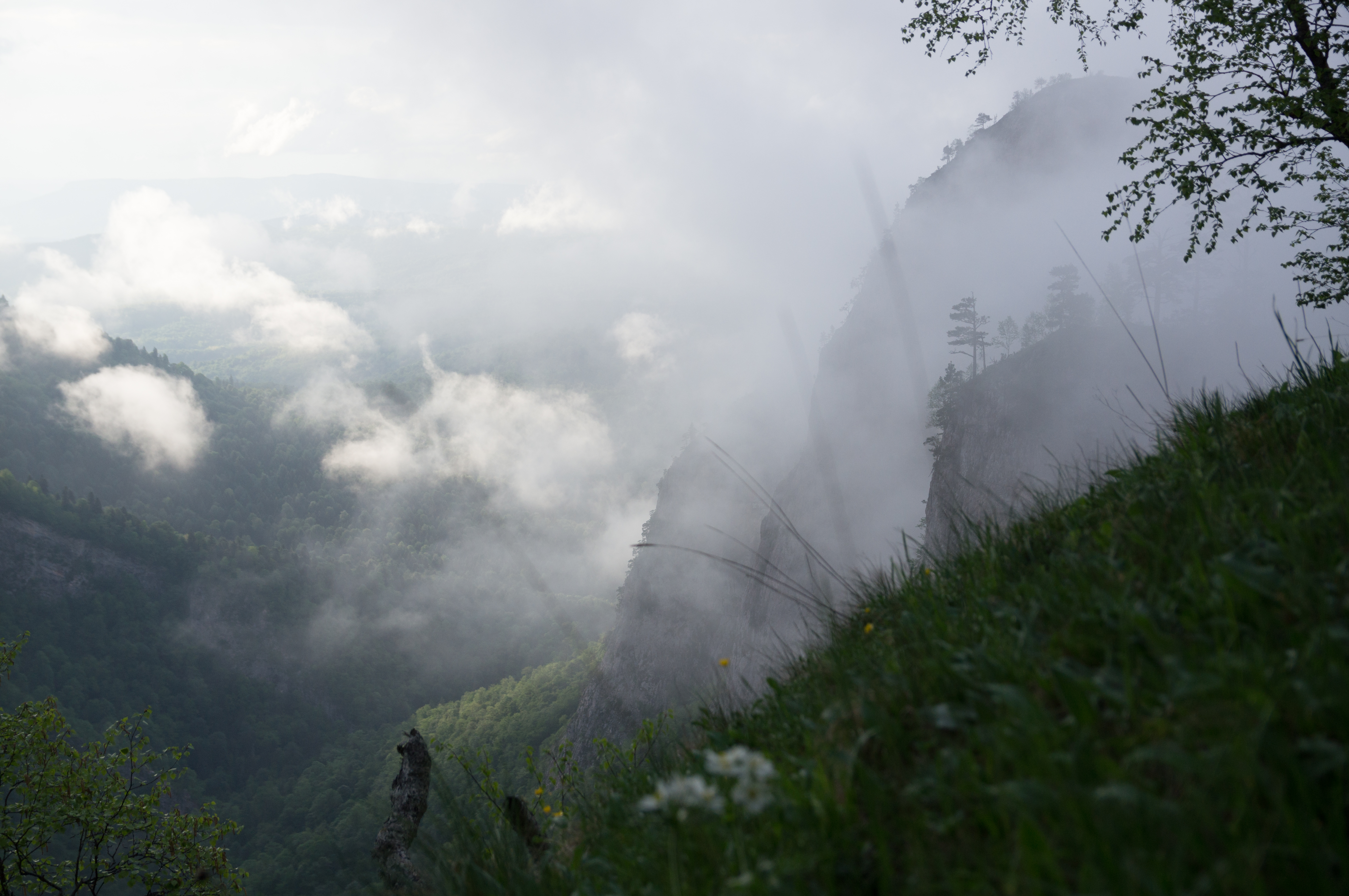
- Khodz river headwaters

- Location within Republic of Adygea Location within Caucasus Mountains Location within European Russia

Physical characteristics
- Mouth: Laba
  - coordinates: 44.5350°N 40.7286°E
- Length: 88 km (55 mi)
- Basin size: 1,250 km^{2} (480 sq mi)

Basin features
- Progression: Laba→ Kuban→ Sea of Azov

The Khodz (Russian: Ходзь; Adyghe: Фэдз) is a river of southwest Russia, a left tributary of the Laba. It flows through the Republic of Adygea. It is 88 kilometres (55 mi) long, and has a drainage basin of 1,250 km^{2} (480 sq mi). The Khodz river valley is home, during breeding season to the threatened Egyptian vulture.
