= Kostromskaya (rural locality) =

Human settlement in Russia

Coordinates: 44°30′N 40°36′E

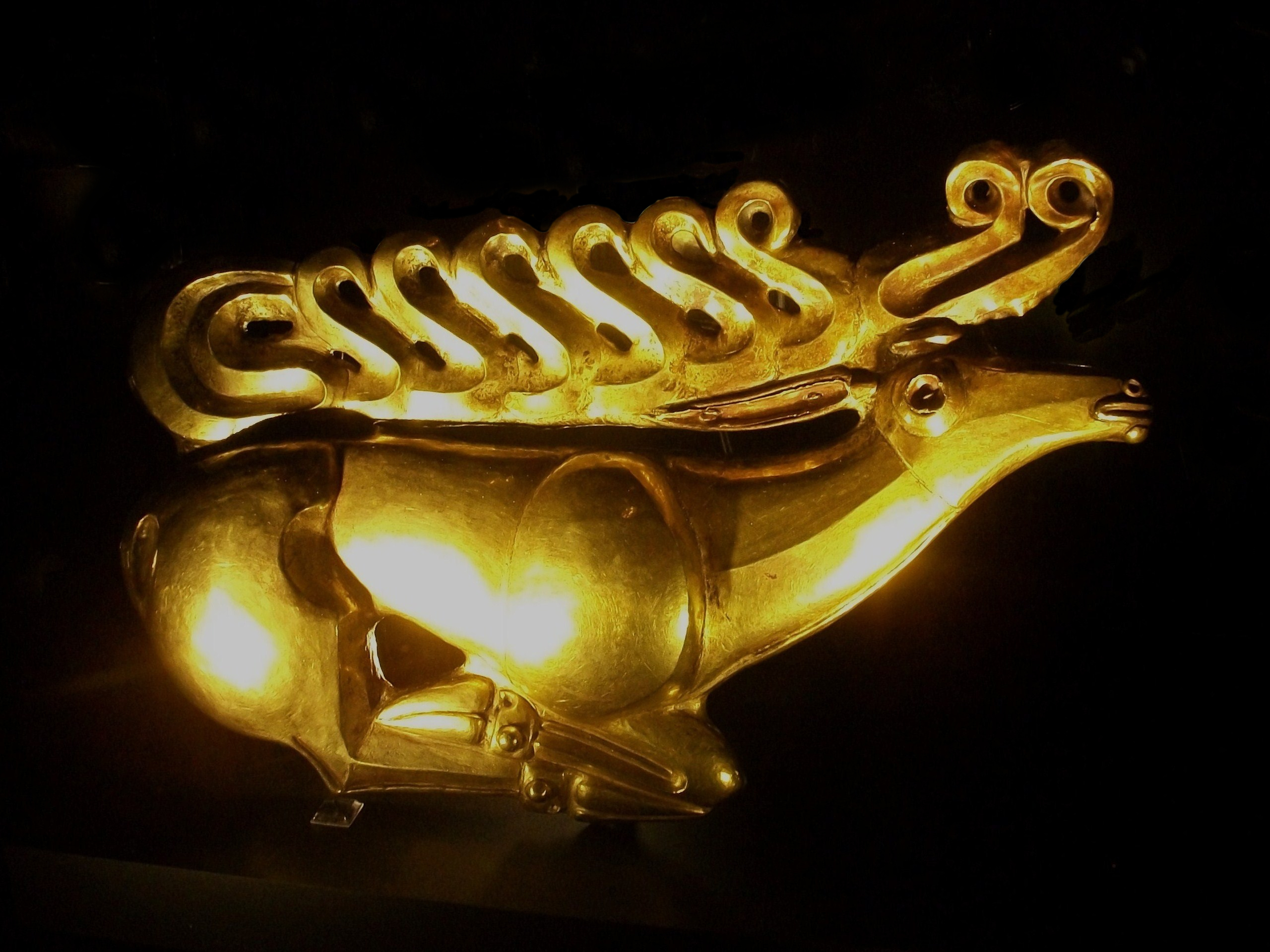
The famous gold stag shield plaque from Kostromskaya, 12.5 in/31.7 cm long, end 7th century BC

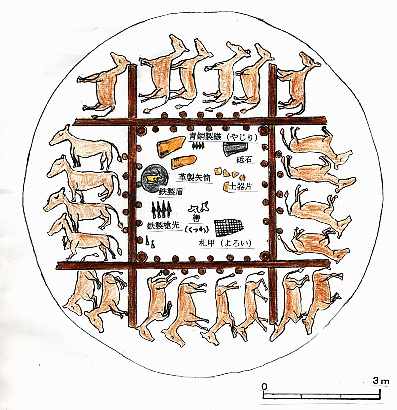
Sketch plan of the kurgan burial

Kostromskaya (Russian: Костромска́я) is a rural locality (a stanitsa) in Mostovsky District of Krasnodar Krai, Russia, located at the footsteps of the Caucasus Mountains on the Psefir River (Fars' tributary, Kuban basin), 15 kilometers (9.3 mi) southwest of the town of Labinsk.

With a population estimated in the hundreds, it is very agrarian and rural in nature and has many mulberry trees. The roads in the village are mostly dirt or rocky. The landscape is very mountainous.

The stanitsa is also home to the ancient Scythian kurgan or burial mound of the 7th century BC where a Scythian gold stag was found, next to the iron shield it decorated. It is one of the most famous pieces of Scythian art, and is now in the Hermitage Museum in St Petersburg. Apart from the principal male body with his accoutrements, the burial included thirteen humans with no adornment above him, and around the edges of the burial twenty-two horses were buried in pairs. The kurgan was excavated by the Russian archaeologist N. I. Veselovski in 1897.
