= Fars (river) =

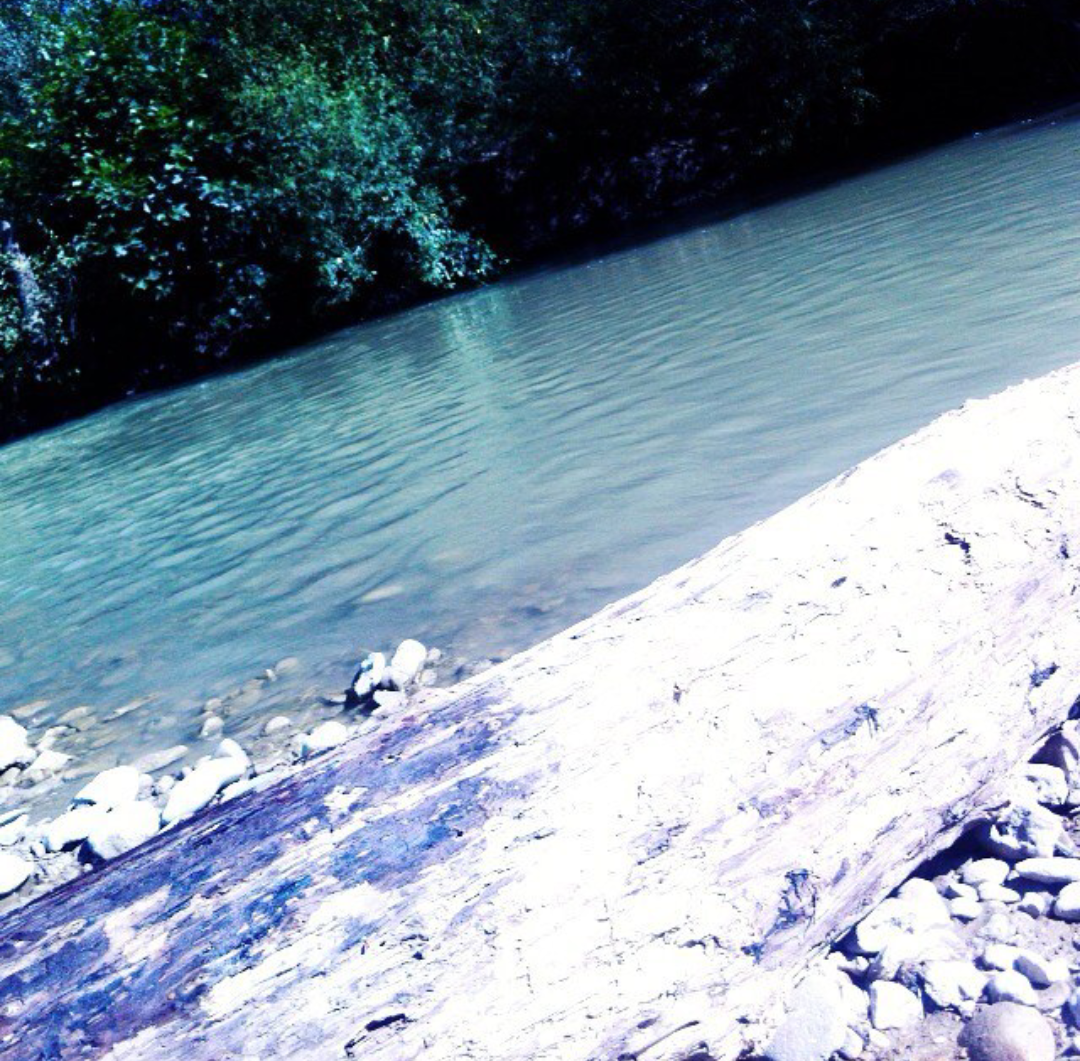

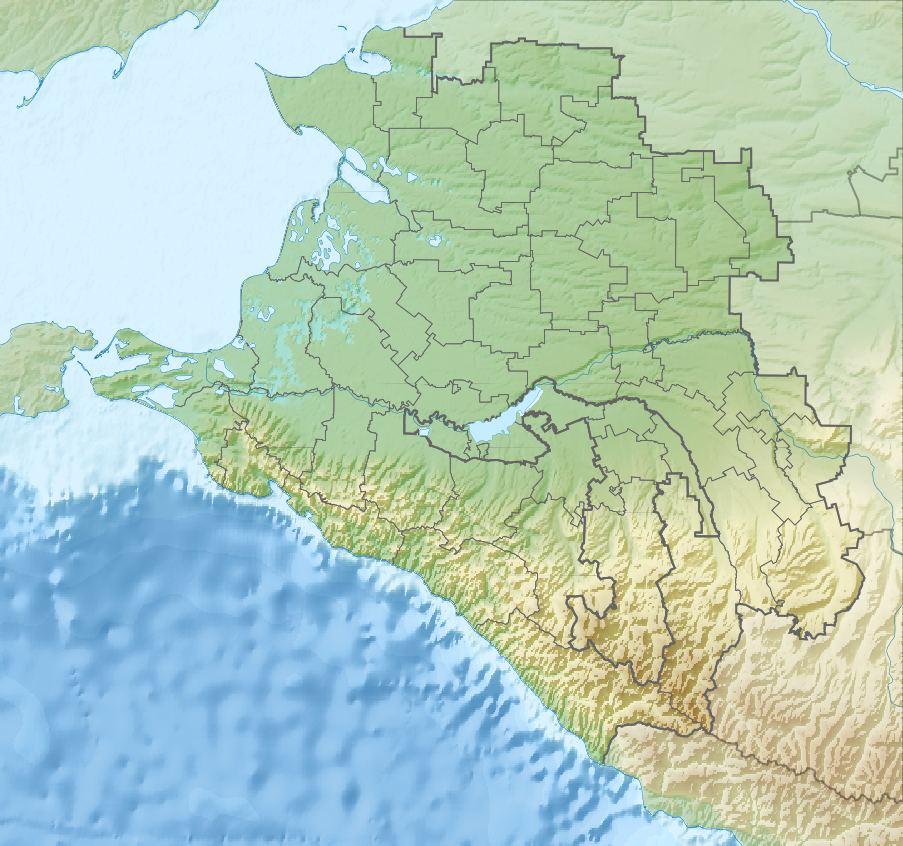
- Location within Republic of Adygea Location within Krasnodar Krai Location within European Russia

Physical characteristics
- Mouth: Laba
  - coordinates: 45.1122°N 40.1252°E
- Length: 197 km (122 mi)
- Basin size: 1,450 km^{2} (560 sq mi)

Basin features
- Progression: Laba→ Kuban→ Sea of Azov

The Fars (Russian: Фарс) is a river of southwest Russia, a left tributary of the Laba. It flows through the Republic of Adygea. The Fars is 197 kilometres (122 mi) long. It has a catchment area of 1,450 square kilometres (560 sq mi). The Psefir is a right tributary.
