= Kostromskoy =

Kostromskoy (masculine), Kostromskaya (feminine), or Kostromskoye (neuter) may refer to:

- Kostromskoy District, a district of Kostroma Oblast
- Kostromskoy (cheese), a type of Russian cheese
- Kostroma Oblast (Kostromskaya oblast), a federal subject of Russia
- Kostromskaya (rural locality), a rural locality (a stanitsa) in Krasnodar Krai, Russia
- Kostromskoye, a rural locality (a selo) in Sakhalin Oblast, Russia
