= Chugush =

Highest mountain in Adygea, Russia

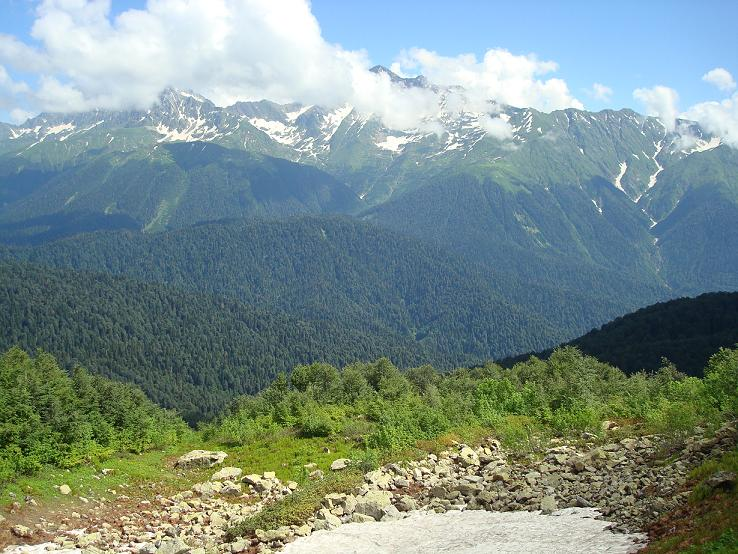

Highest point
- Elevation: 3,238 m (10,623 ft)
- Prominence: 1,322 m (4,337 ft)
- Parent peak: Gora Pshish
- Isolation: 21.08 km (13.10 mi)
- Listing: Ribu
- Coordinates: 43°48′05″N 40°12′09″E

Geography
- Location within Caucasus Mountains
- Location: Adygea, Russia
- Country: Russia
- Parent range: Caucasus

The Chugush (Russian: Чугуш) is the highest mountain in Adygea, Russia, located in the Western Caucasus. Its height is 3,238 metres (10,623 ft). The mountain has 10 glaciers covering an area of 1.2 km^{2}. One of the glaciers feeds the Kisha River flowing towards the Belaya River.

== See also ==
- List of highest points of Russian federal subjects
