= Laba (river) =

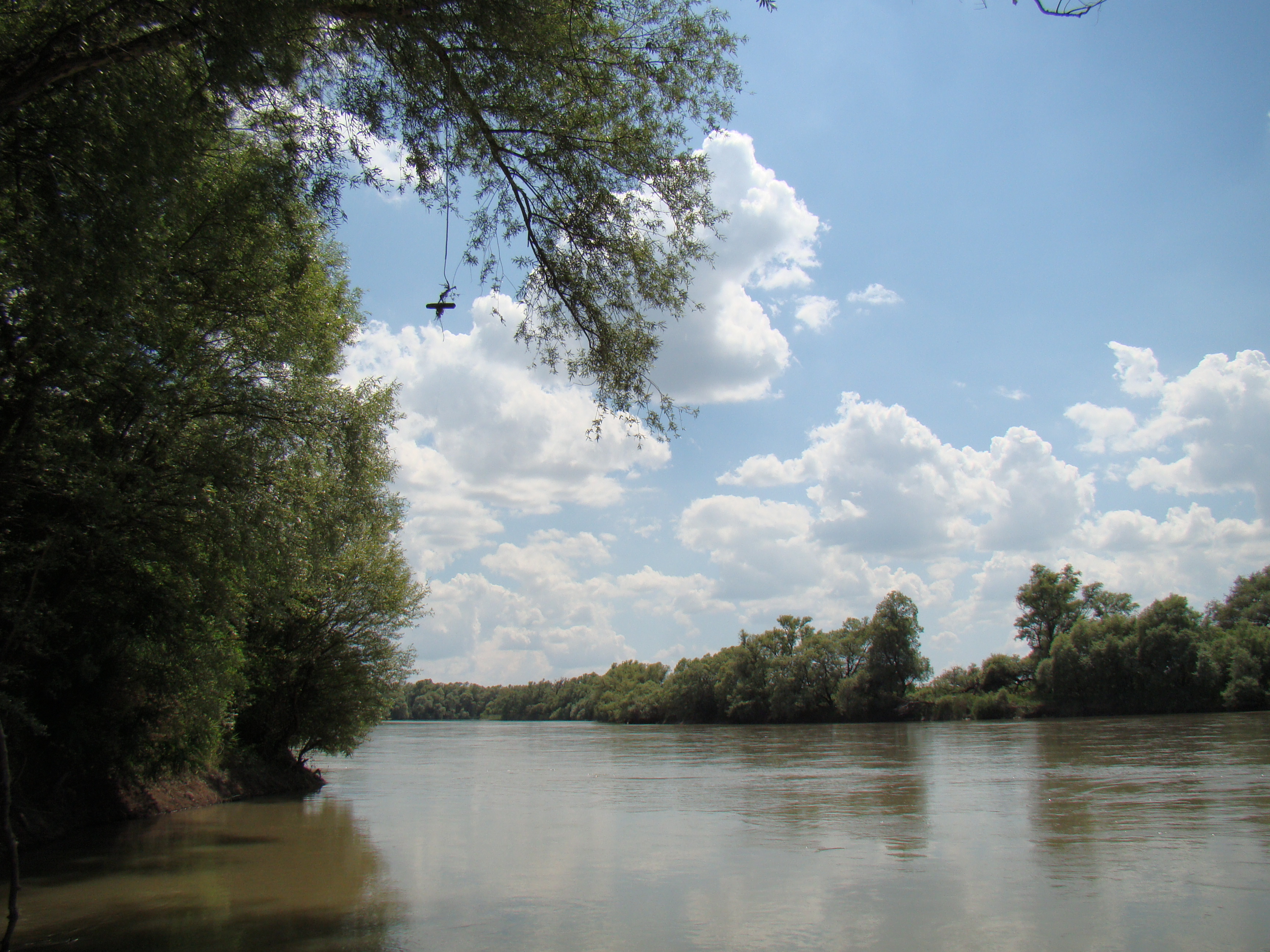

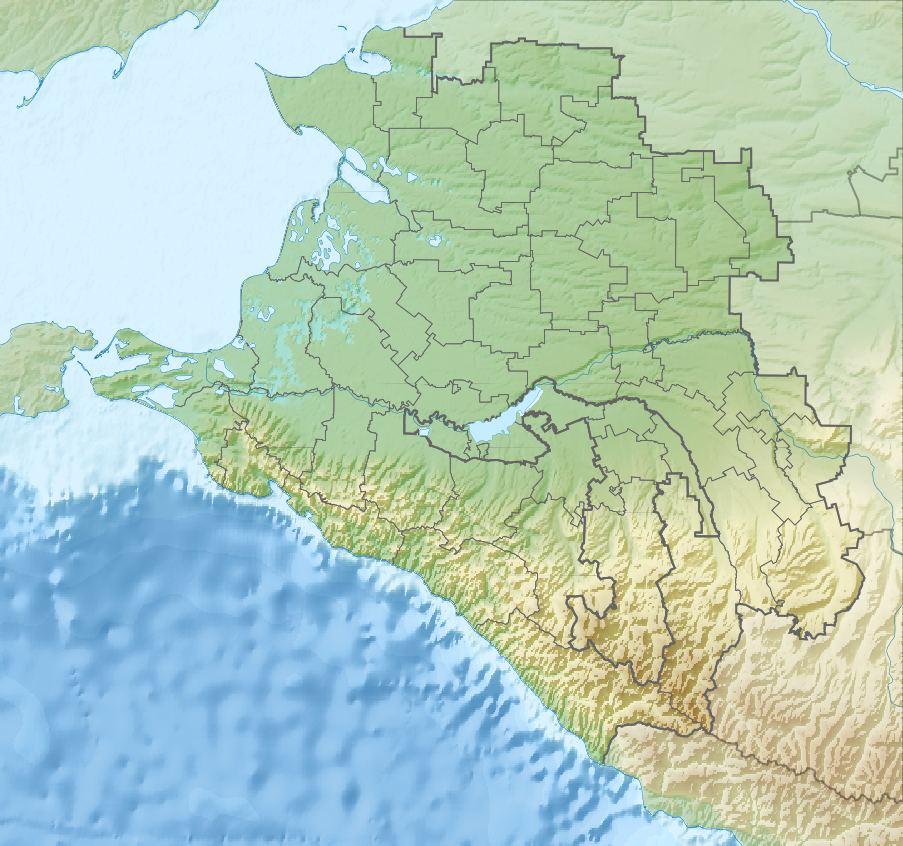
- Location within Krasnodar Krai Location within Caucasus Mountains Location within European Russia

Physical characteristics
- Source
  - coordinates: 44°17′15″N 40°53′45″E
- Mouth: Kuban
  - coordinates: 45°11′14″N 39°41′29″E
- Length: 214 km (133 mi)
- Basin size: 12,500 km^{2} (4,800 sq mi)

Basin features
- Progression: Kuban→ Sea of Azov

The Laba (Russian: Лаба; Circassian: Лабэжъ Labez̄) is a river in Krasnodar Krai and Adygea of European Russia. It is a left tributary of the Kuban, which it joins at Ust-Labinsk. It is formed by the confluence of the Bolshaya Laba and the Malaya Laba (Малая Лаба; Лабэжьый Labez̄yj). It is used for irrigation and log driving. It is also suitable for rafting. It is 214 kilometres (133 mi) long (347 kilometres (216 mi) including the Bolshaya Laba), and has a drainage basin of 12,500 square kilometres (4,800 sq mi).

Its main tributaries are, from source to mouth, Malaya Laba (left), Khodz (left), Chokhrak (left), Chamlyk (right), Fars (left), Ulka (left), Giaga (left) and Psenafa (left).
