= Kostroma (inhabited locality) =

Kostroma (Russian: Кострома́) is the name of several inhabited localities in Russia.

Urban localities

- Kostroma, a city in Kostroma Oblast; 57°45′N 40°55′E

Rural localities

- Kostroma, Belgorod Oblast, a selo in Prokhorovsky District of Belgorod Oblast
- Kostroma, Kamchatka Krai, a selo in Karaginsky District of Kamchatka Krai
- Kostroma, Sverdlovsk Oblast, a village in Kostinsky Selsoviet of Alapayevsky District in Sverdlovsk Oblast
