= Maykop Airport =

Airport in Maykop, Russia

Maykop Airport Майкоп Шъо Нэфыхьэр
- IATA: none; ICAO: URKM

Summary
- Airport type: Public
- Operator: OAO "Adyghea Air Lines"
- Serves: Maykop, Adyghea, Russia
- Location: North of Maykop
- Elevation AMSL: 680 ft (210 m)
- Coordinates: 44°37′51″N 40°06′12″E
- Interactive map of Maykop Airport

Runways
Direction	Length		Surface
Direction	m	ft	Surface
13/31	2,600	8,500	Dirt

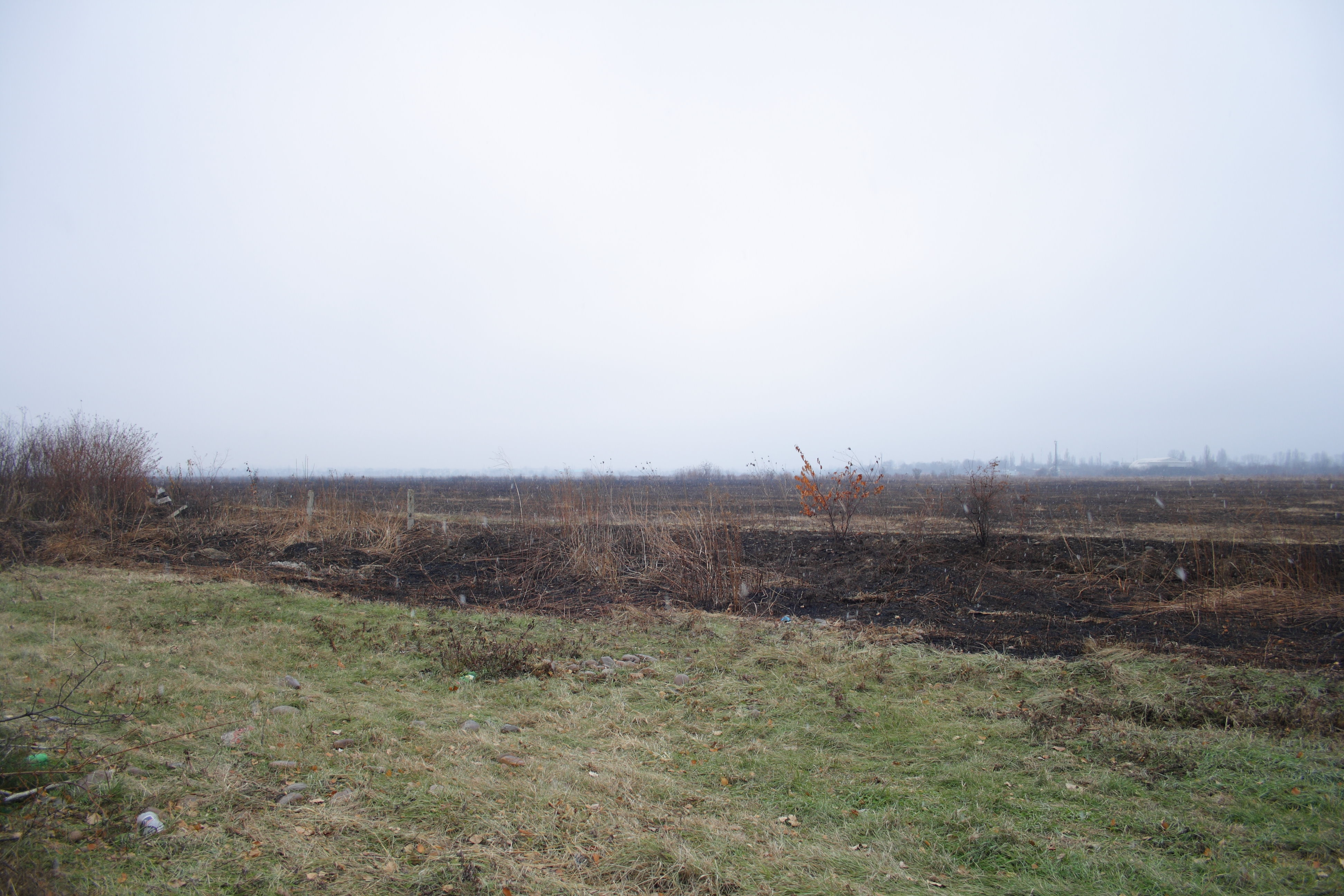
Maykop Airport in 2011

Maykop Airport (Adyghe: Майкоп Шъо Нэфыхьэр, Russian: Аэропорт «Майкоп») (ICAO: URKM) is a former civilian airport located on the north of Maykop, Russia. It has no solid-surface runway and was licensed for turboprop traffic only. The Khanskaya air base (ICAO: URKH), which has a 2,500 m (8,200 ft) concrete runway, is about 5.2 km (3.2 mi) northwest of Maykop Airport and about 6.0 km (3.7 mi) east of Khanskaya.

== Status ==
Maykop Airport lost certificates for exercise in 2009. Currently unused, the airport is in a dilapidated and ruined state.

In 2025 the airport's land for the runway and most of the taxiway have been sold, and now apartments are being built on the land.
