= Bolshaya Laba =

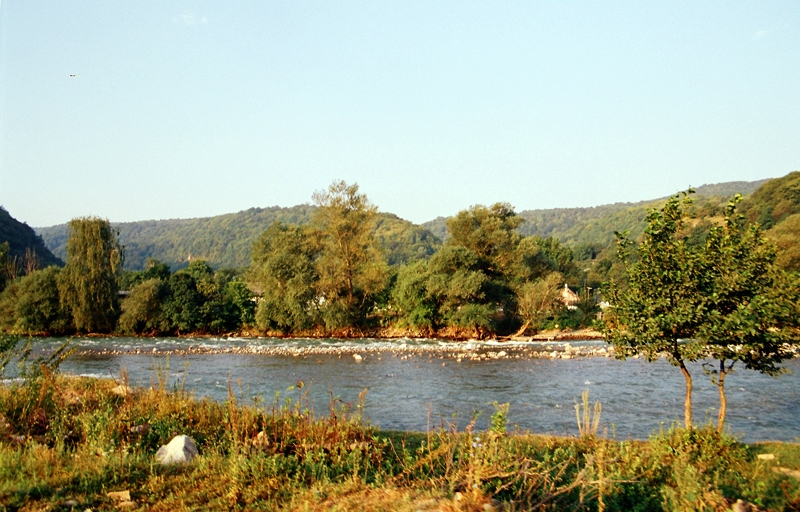

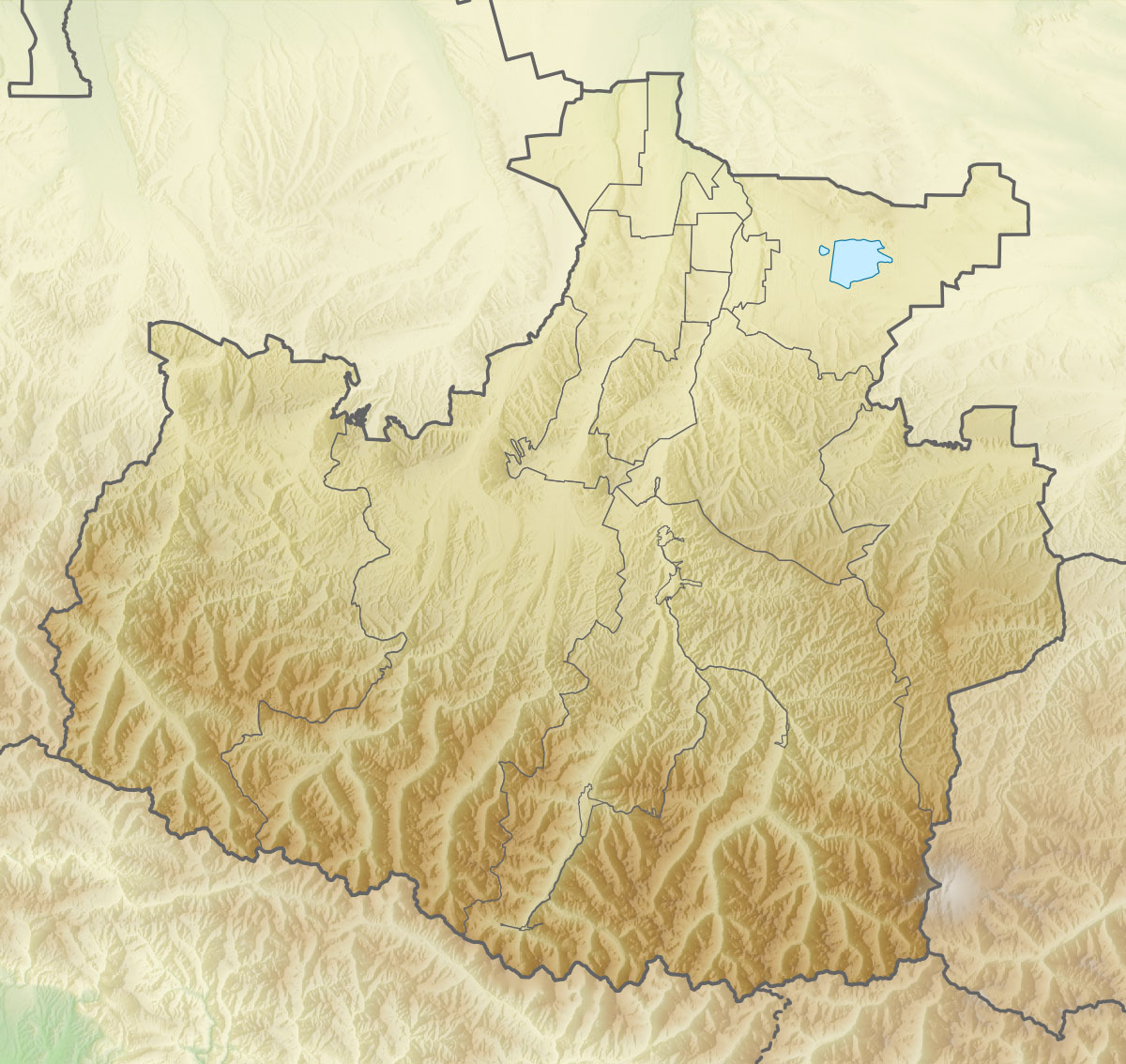
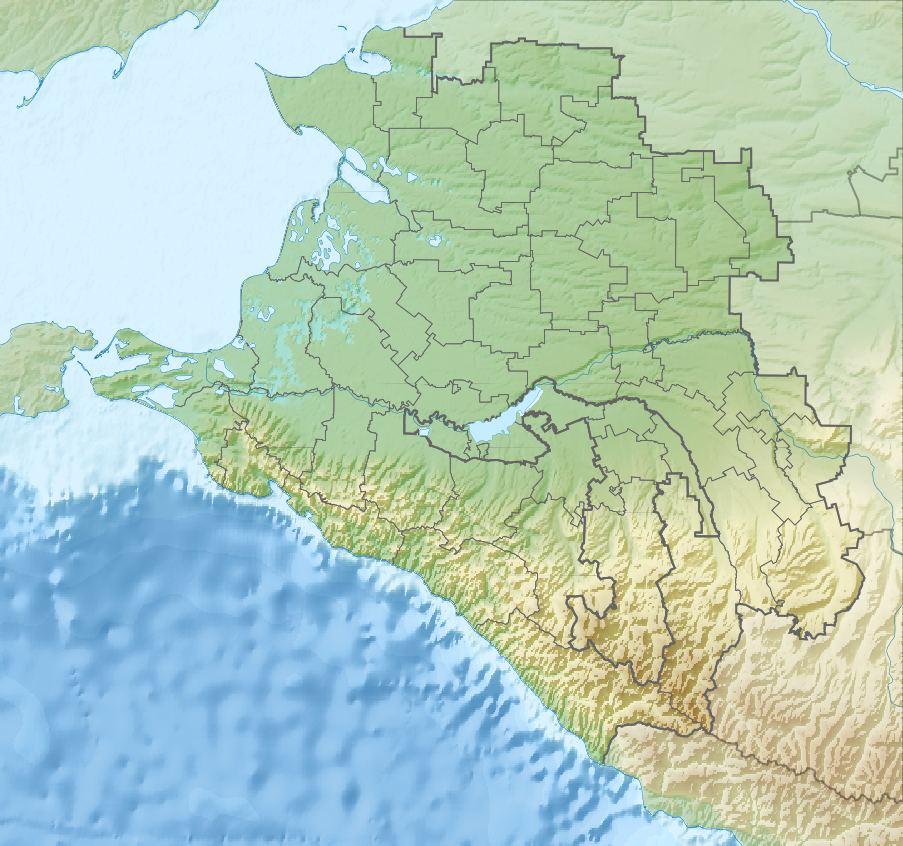
- Location within Karachay-Cherkessia Location within Krasnodar Krai Location within Caucasus Mountains Location within European Russia

Physical characteristics
- Mouth: Laba
  - coordinates: 44.2778°N 40.8961°E
- Length: 133 km (83 mi)

Basin features
- Progression: Laba→ Kuban→ Sea of Azov

The Bolshaya Laba (Russian: Большая Лаба; Adyghe: Лабэшхуэ, Labešxwe, [laːbaʃxwa]), or Great Laba, is a 133-kilometer (83 mi) river in the Karachay-Cherkess Republic, Russia. From the confluence with the Malaya Laba it carries on as the Laba.

Bolshaya Laba has several tributaries, including the right tributary Phiya, which originates from the glacier of the Zakyn-Syrt mountain. Other left tributaries of the river include Sancharo, Makera, Mamkhurts, Damkhurts, and Zakan, which originates from the glaciers of the Main Caucasian Range.

Several villages and settlements are located along the banks of Bolshaya Laba, including Pkhiya, Zagedan, Damkhurts, Rozhkao, Psemyon, Kurdzhinovo, Ershov, Podskalnoye, Predgornoye, and the abolished village of Akhmet-Kaya, which are located in Karachay-Cherkessia. In the Krasnodar Territory, the river passes through the settlements of Akhmetovskaya, Chernorechenskaya, and Gofitskoye. Bolshaya Laba merges with Laba Malaya at the village of Kaladzhinskaya.

== Bibliography ==
- Dinnik N. Ya. Laba, a tributary of the Kuban // Encyclopedic Dictionary of Brockhaus and Efron : in 86 volumes (82 volumes and 4 additional). - St. Petersburg, 1890-1907
