= Adygea =

First-level administrative division of Russia

Republic of Adygea Адыгэ Республик (Adyghe) Республика Адыгея (Russian)
- Republic

- Flag Coat of arms
- Anthem: Anthem of the Republic of Adygea
- Interactive map of Republic of Adygea
- Location within European Russia
- Coordinates: 44°39′N 40°00′E
- Country: Russia
- Federal district: Southern
- Economic region: North Caucasus
- Capital: Maykop

Government
  - Body: State Council (Khase)
  - Head: Murat Kumpilov
  - Member of the State Duma: Vladislav Reznik
  - Senators: Alexander Narolin; Murat Khapsirokov

Area
  - Total: 7,792 km^{2} (3,009 sq mi)

Population (2021 Census)
  - Total: ▲496,934: 64.4% Russians; 25.7% Adyghe; 3.3% Armenians; 0.6% Ukrainians; 6% other
  - Rank: 75th
  - Density: 63.77/km^{2} (165.2/sq mi)
  - Urban: 49.4%
  - Rural: 50.6%

GDP (nominal, 2024)
  - Total: ₽223 billion (US$2.62 billion)
  - Per capita: ₽446,662 (US$5,241.22)
- Time zone: UTC+3 (MSK)
- ISO 3166 code: RU-AD
- Vehicle registration: 01
- Official language(s): Adyghe • Russian

Adygea (/ˌɑːdɪˈɡeɪə/ AH-dig-AY-ə), officially the Republic of Adygea (Note: Adyghe: Адыгэ Республик, romanized: Adygə Respublik, IPA: [aːdɘˈɣɐ rʲeˈspublik]; Russian: Республика Адыгея, romanized: Respublika Adygeya, IPA: [rʲɪˈspublʲɪkə ədɨˈɡʲejə]) or the Adygean Republic, is a republic of Russia. It is situated in the North Caucasus of Eastern Europe. The republic is a part of the Southern Federal District, and covers an area of 7,600 square kilometers (2,900 sq mi), with a population of roughly 500,731 residents as of 2025. It is an enclave within Krasnodar Krai and is the fifth-smallest Russian federal subject by area. Maykop is the capital and the largest city of Adygea, home to one-third of the republic's population.

Adygea is one of Russia's ethnic republics, primarily representing the indigenous Circassian people who form 25% of the Republic's population, while Russians form a majority at 60%, and with minority populations of Armenians and Ukrainians. The official languages of Adygea are Adyghe and Russian.

== History ==
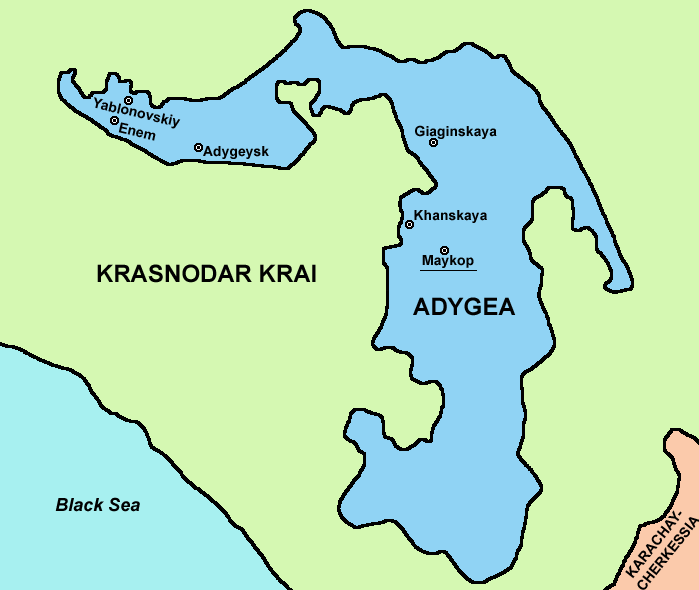
Map of Adygea

The Cherkess (Adyghe) Autonomous Oblast was established within the Russian SFSR on July 27, 1922, on the territories of the Kuban-Black Sea Oblast, primarily settled by the Adyghe people. At that time, Krasnodar was the administrative center. It was renamed Adyghe (Cherkess) Autonomous Oblast on August 24, 1922, soon after its creation. In the first two years of its existence the autonomous oblast was a part of the Russian SFSR, but on October 17, 1924, it was transferred to the jurisdiction of the newly created North Caucasus Krai within the RSFSR.

It was renamed Adyghe Autonomous Oblast (AO) in July 1928. On January 10, 1934, the autonomous oblast became part of the new Azov-Black Sea Krai, which was removed from North Caucasus Krai. Maykop was made the administrative center of the autonomous oblast in 1936. Adyghe AO became part of Krasnodar Krai when it was established on September 13, 1937.

On July 3, 1991, the oblast was elevated to the status of a republic under the jurisdiction of the Russian Federation. The first President of the republic was Aslan Dzharimov, elected on 5 January 1992.

Russians make up two-thirds of the population within Adygea. The current Head of Adygea is Murat Kumpilov.

== Geography ==
Adygea lies in Russia's Southern Federal District of Eastern Europe, in the foothills of the Northwestern Caucasus in the Caucasus Mountains System, with plains in the northern areas and mountains in the southern area. Forests (mainly of European beech, oak, and maple) cover almost 40% of its territory.

- Area — 7,792 km^{2} (3,009 sq mi).
- Borders — the Republic of Adygea is entirely surrounded by Krasnodar Krai.
- Highest point — Chugush Mountain: 3,238 m (10,623 ft).

=== Rivers ===
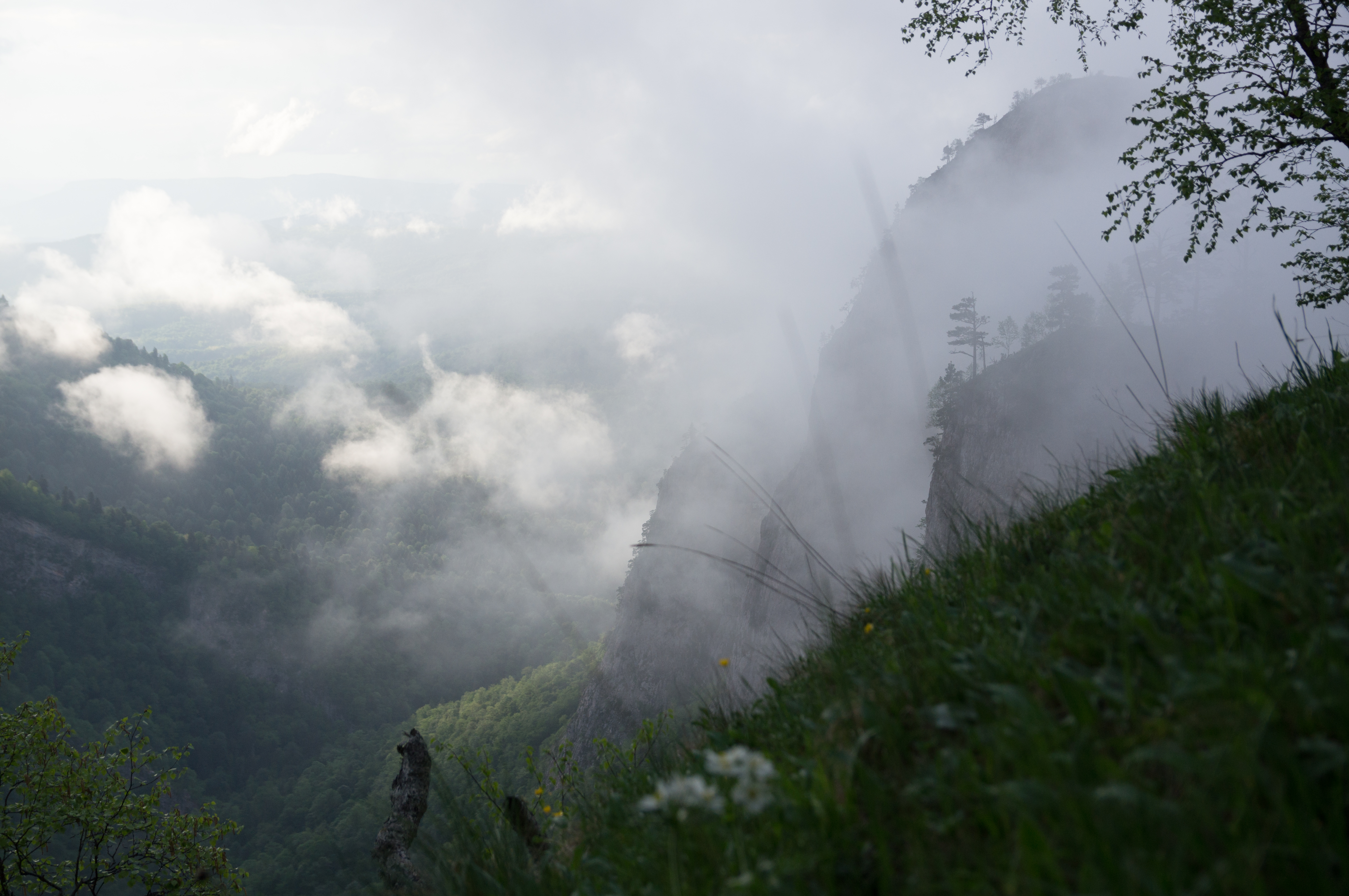
Khodz river headwaters, endemic region

The 870-kilometer (540 mi) long Kuban River is one of the major navigable rivers in the Caucasus region. It forms part of the northern border between the Republic of Adygea and Krasnodar Krai.
Other rivers include:

- Belaya River
- Chokhrak River
- Dakh River
- Fars River
- Khodz River
- Kisha River
- Bolshaya Laba River — (forming part of the eastern border between Adygea and Krasnodar Krai)
- Psekups River
- Pshish River
- Sakhray River
- Sukhoy Kurdzhips River — flows near the archaeological site at Mezmaiskaya cave.

=== Lakes ===
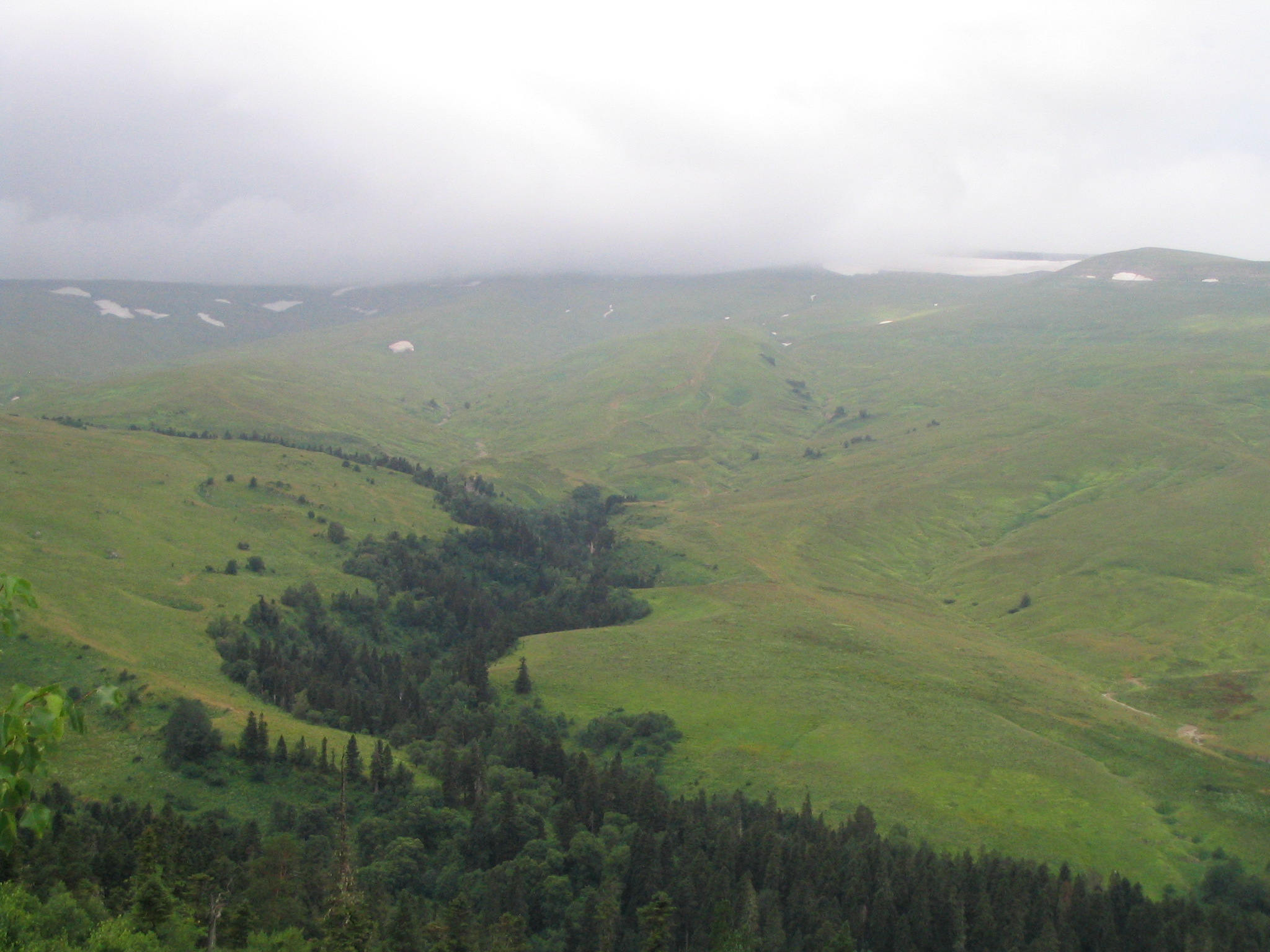
Lago-Naki plateau in Adygea

The republic has no large lakes. However, it has several reservoirs:

- Krasnodar Reservoir, the largest in North Caucasus
- Oktyabrskoye Reservoir
- Shapsug Reservoir
- Tshchikskoye Reservoir (Тщикское)
- Shendzhiyskoye Reservoir
- Chetukskoye Reservoir
- Kuzhorskoye Reservoir
- Maykop Reservoir

=== Mountains ===
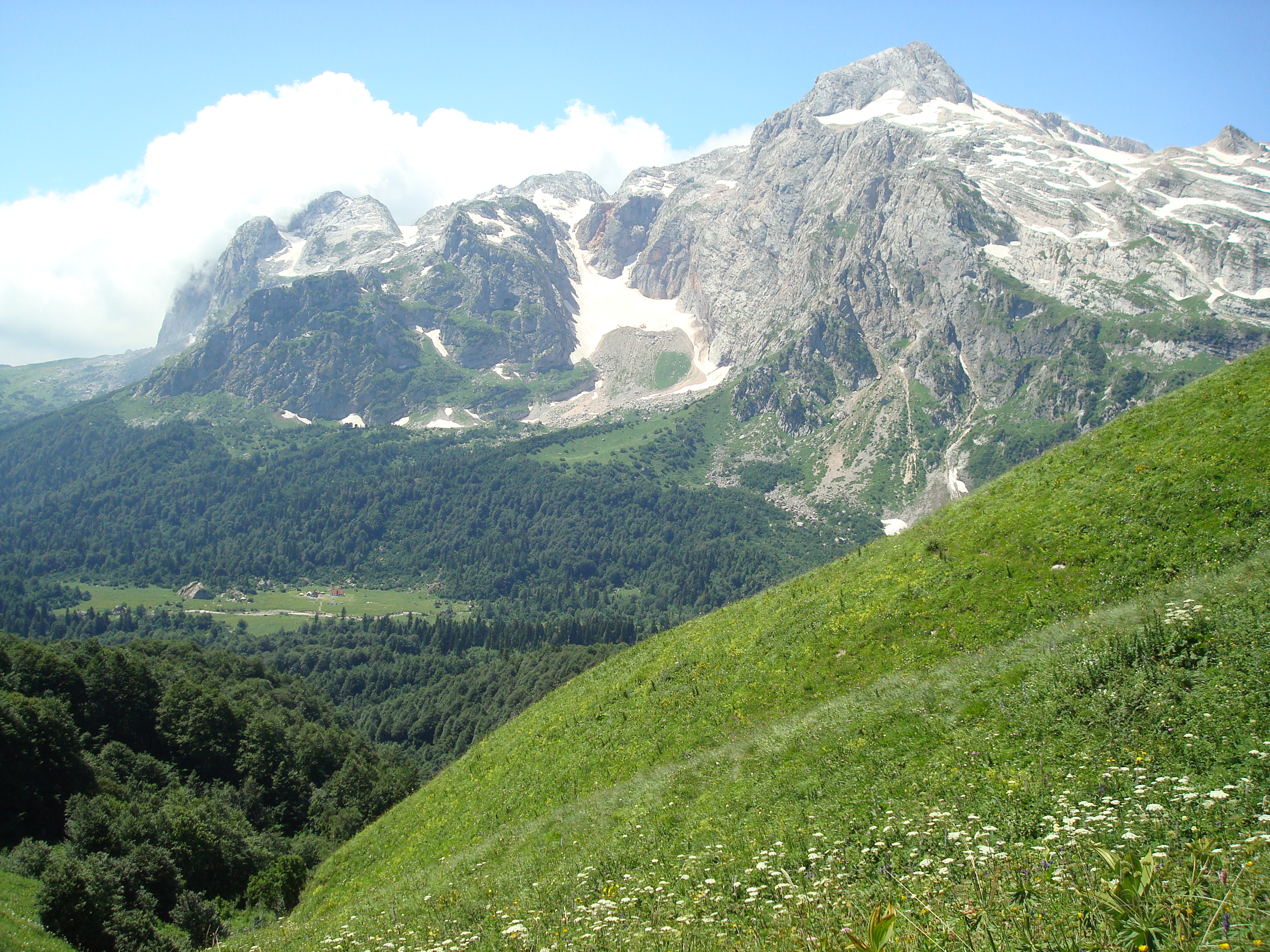
Mount Fisht

The republic's major mountains and peaks range in height from 2,000–3,238 metres (6,562–10,623 ft), and include:

- Chugush Mountain — 3,238 m (10,623 ft)
- Mount Fisht — 2,868 m (9,409 ft)
- Oshten Mountain
- Pseashkho Mountain
- Shepsi Mountain

=== Natural resources ===
The republic is rich in oil and natural gas. Other natural resources include gold, silver, tungsten, and iron.

=== Climate ===
- Average January temperature: −0.5 °C (31.1 °F)
- Average July temperature: +23 °C (73 °F)
- Average annual precipitation: 70 centimeters (28 in)

February 15, 2010, recorded the absolute maximum for the winter months—in the capital, the city of Maykop, the temperature was 23.4 °C (74.1 °F).

== Politics ==
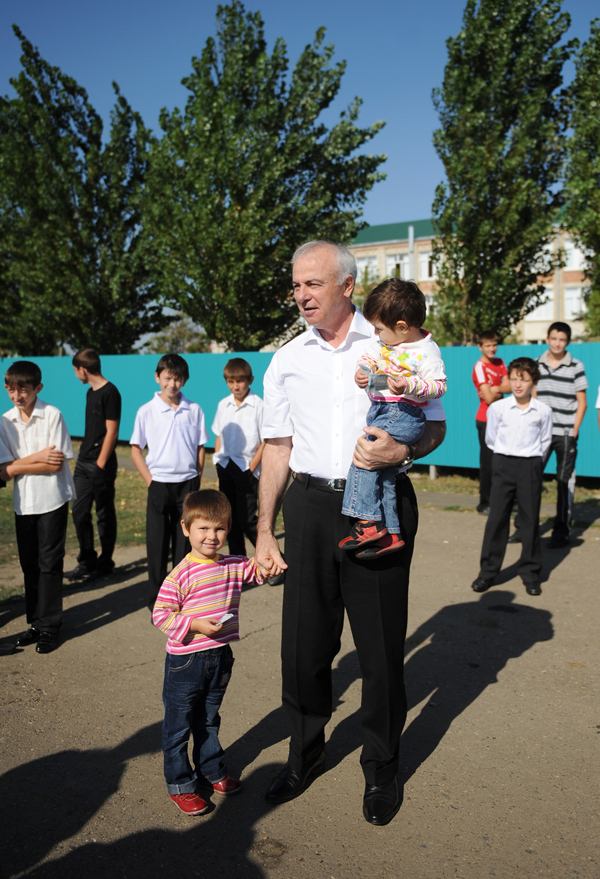
Former Head of the Republic of Adygea, Aslan Tkhakushinov, in 2010

The chief executive of the government of the Republic of Adygea is the Head (called "President" until May 2011), who is appointed for a five-year term. Proficiency in the Adyghe language is a prerequisite for the candidate.

The current Head, Murat Kumpilov (since January 27, 2017), succeeded Aslan Tkhakushinov, initially as acting Head of the region. There is also a directly elected State Council (Khase or Xase—not to be confused with the Adyghe Khase, a union of Adyghe who supported Sovmen for a second term), which comprises the Council of Representatives and the Council of the Republic. Both councils are elected every five years and have 27 deputies each.

The Republic sends three representatives to the parliament of the Russian Federation; one to the State Duma and the other two to the Federation Council.

The Constitution of the Republic of Adygea was adopted on May 14, 1995.

== Administrative divisions ==
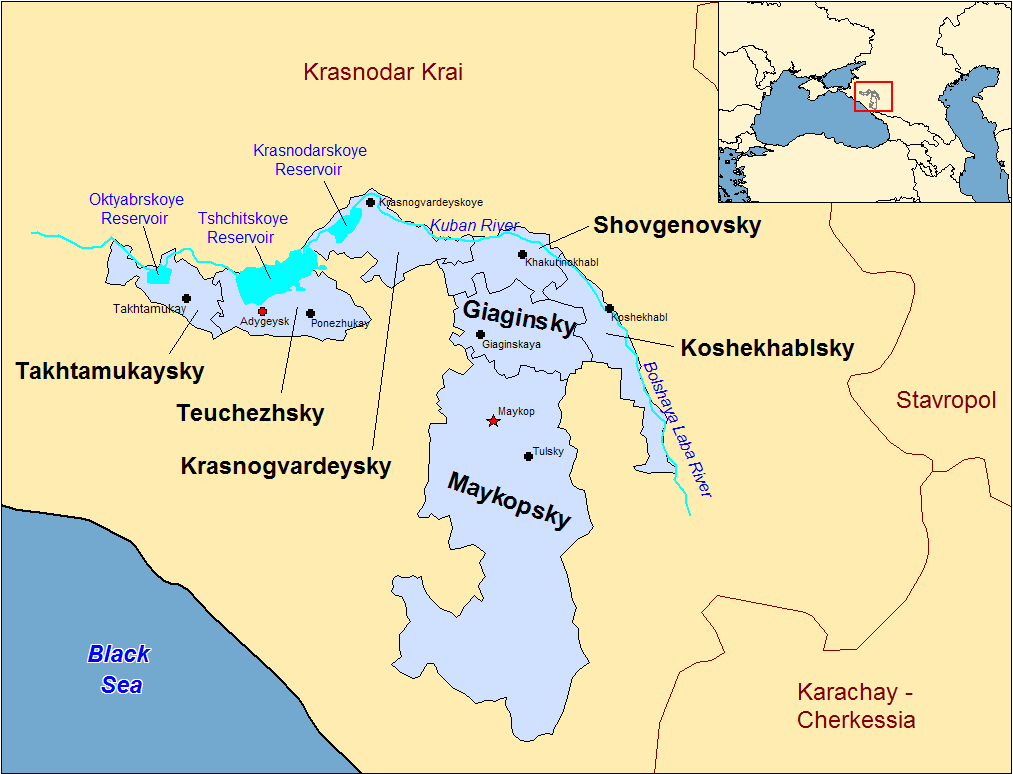
Administrative divisions of the Republic of Adygea

The Republic of Adygea is administratively divided into seven districts (raions), two cities/towns, and (at a lower administrative level) five urban-type settlements. Municipally, the republic is divided into two urban okrugs, five urban settlements, and 46 rural settlements.

| Name | Local Name | Area in km^{2} | Population Census 2010 | Population Census 2021 | Population Estimate 1 Jan 2025 |
|---|---|---|---|---|---|
Cities (republican municipal districts)
| Maykop | Городской округ Майкоп | 58.6 | 166,540 | 167,658 | 161,818 |
| Adygeysk | Городской округ Адыгейск | 32.4 | 14,659 | 15,625 | 15,659 |
Districts
| Giaginsky District | Гиагинский м.р. | 790.0 | 31,766 | 31,937 | 31,735 |
| Koshekhablsky District | Кошехабльский м.р. | 606.7 | 30,422 | 30,047 | 30,200 |
| Krasnogvardeysky District | Красногвардейский м.р. | 725.5 | 30,868 | 32,049 | 31,858 |
| Maykopsky District | Майкопский м.р. | 3,667.4 | 58,439 | 58,477 | 59,243 |
| Takhtamukaysky District | Тахтамукайский м.р. | 440.0 | 69,662 | 122,759 | 131,771 |
| Teuchezhsky District | Теучежский м.р. | 710.0 | 20,643 | 22,155 | 22,254 |
| Shovgenovsky District | Шовгеновский м.р. | 521.4 | 16,997 | 16,227 | 16,193 |
| Adygea Republic | Республика Адыгея | 7,600.0 | 439,996 | 496,934 | 500,731 |

- Note "м.р." above is an abbreviation for "муниципальный район" (Municipal District)

== Demographics ==
- Population: 496,934 (2021 census); 439,996 (2010 census); 447,109 (2002 census); 432,588 (1989 Soviet census).

Historical population
| Year | Pop. | ±% |
|---|---|---|
| 1926 | 113,481 | — |
| 1939 | 241,799 | +113.1% |
| 1959 | 284,690 | +17.7% |
| 1970 | 385,644 | +35.5% |
| 1979 | 404,504 | +4.9% |
| 1989 | 432,588 | +6.9% |
| 2002 | 447,109 | +3.4% |
| 2010 | 439,996 | −1.6% |
| 2021 | 496,934 | +12.9% |
| 2025 | 500,731 | +0.8% |
Source: Census data (2025 = official estimate)

| | 2019 | 2021 |
|---|---|---|
| Average: | 73.8 years | 71.2 years |
| Male: | 69.1 years | 66.6 years |
| Female: | 78.4 years | 75.8 years |

- Life expectancy:
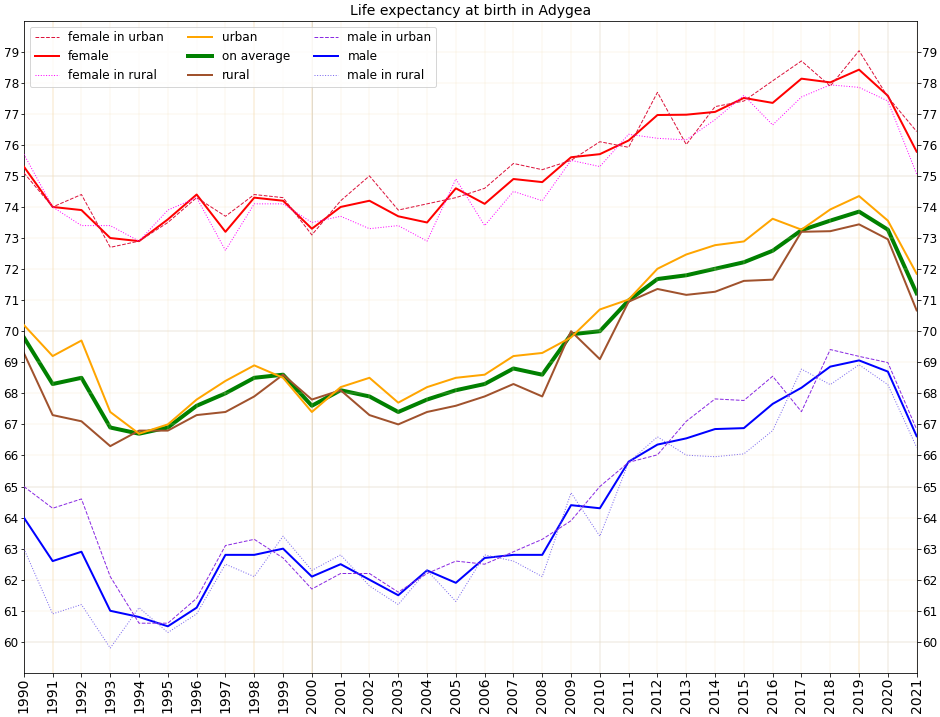
Life expectancy at birth in Adygea

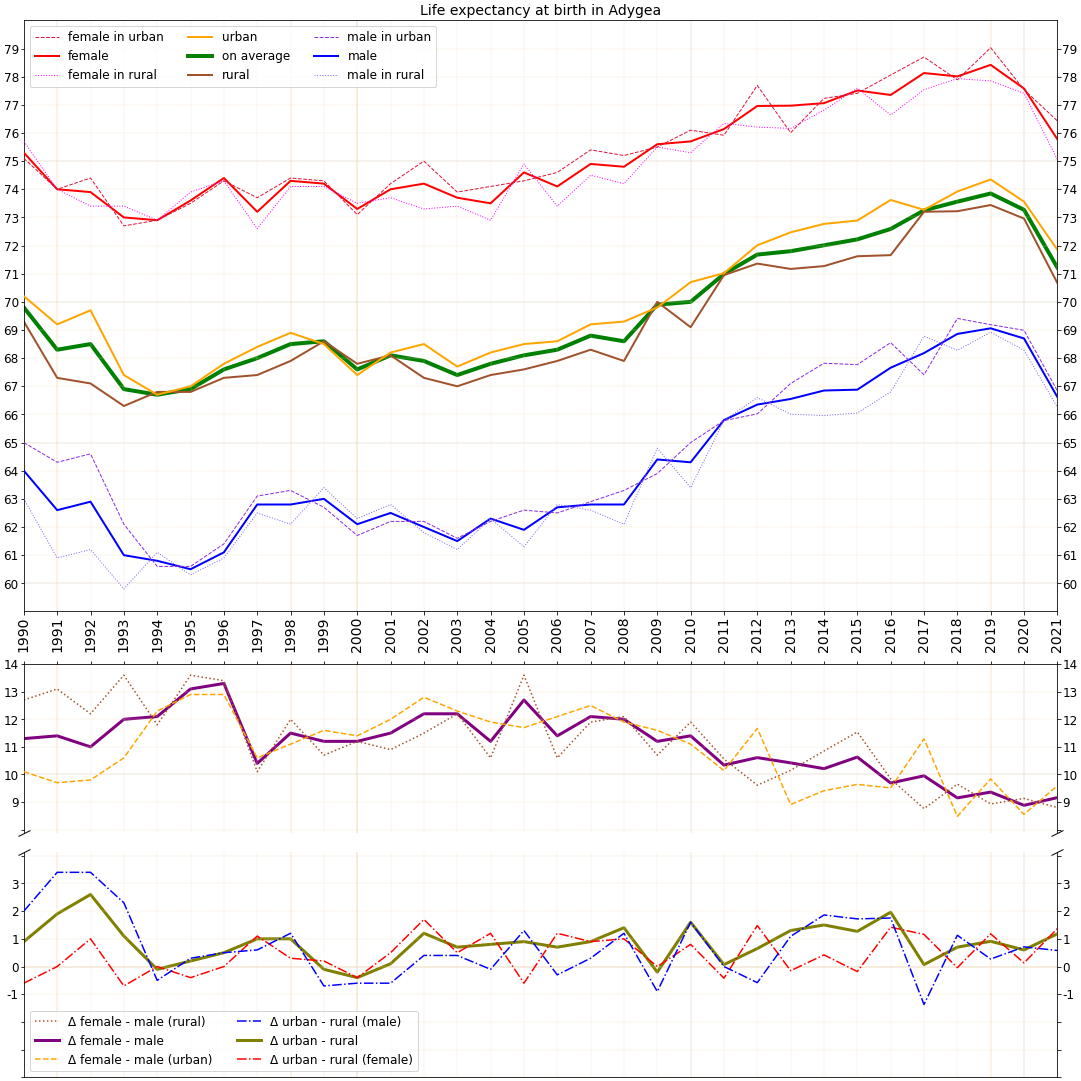
Life expectancy with calculated differences

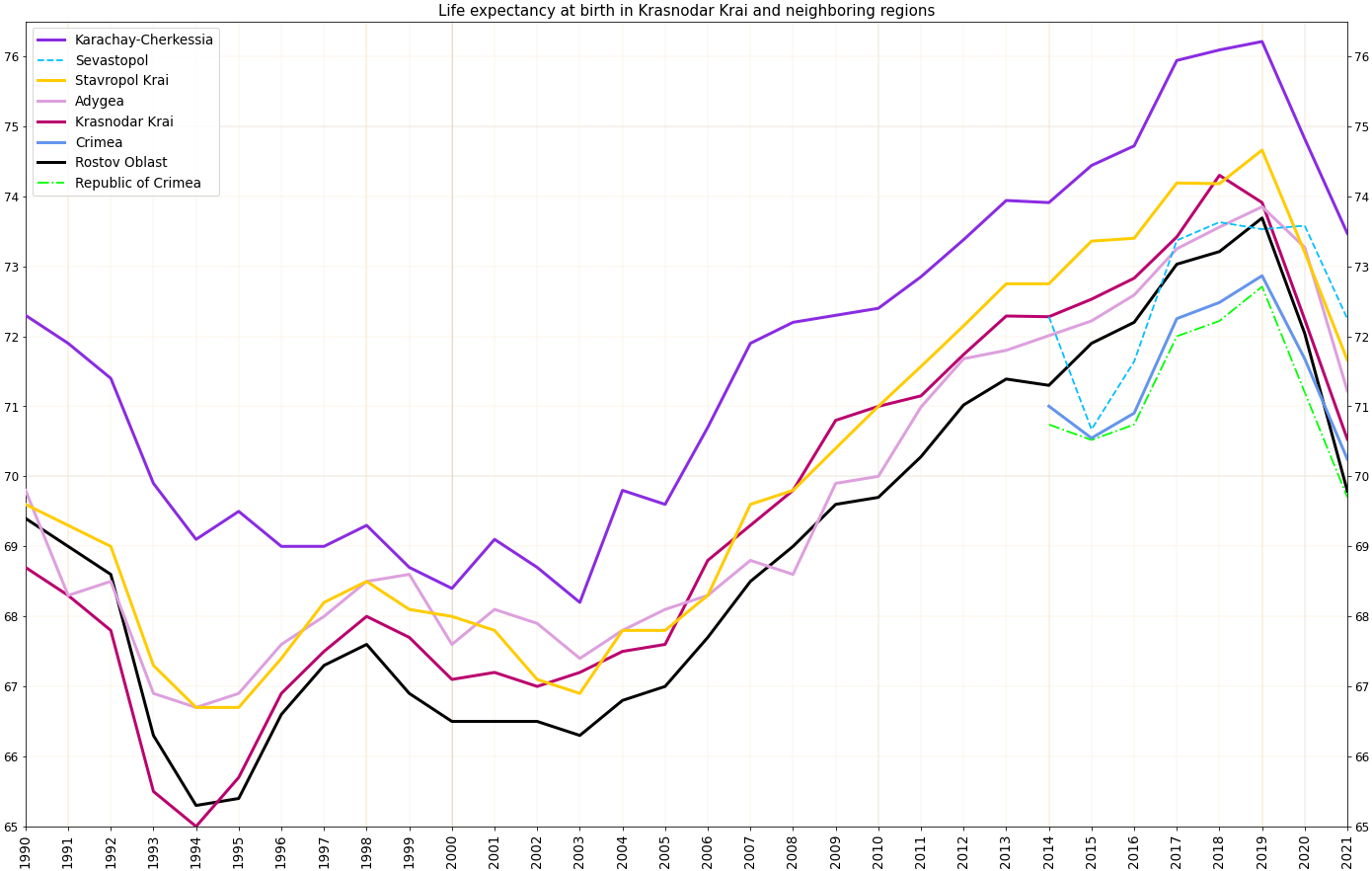
Life expectancy in Adygea, Krasnodar Krai and neighboring regions

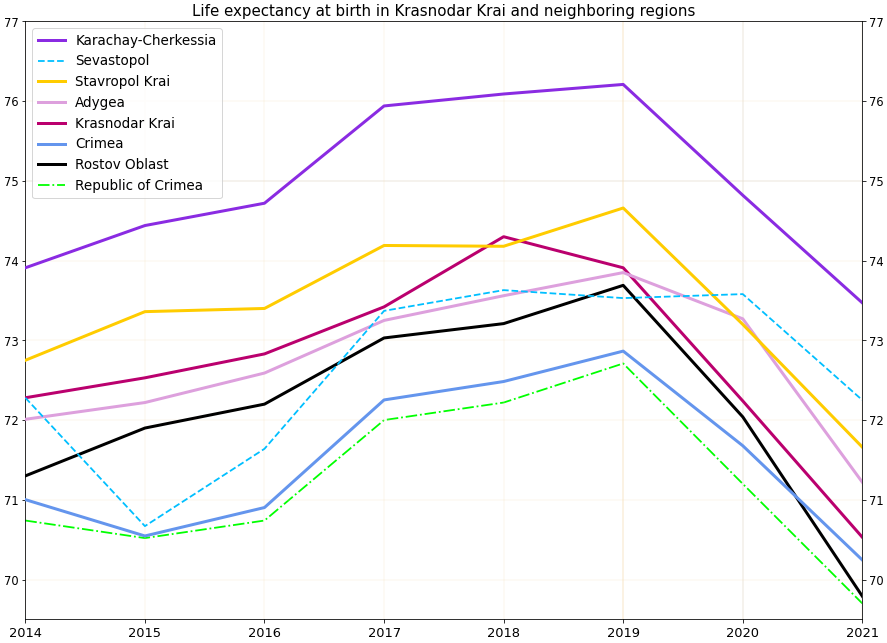
Zoomed version of the chart since 2014

=== Vital statistics ===
Source: Russian Federal State Statistics Service

| | Average population | Live births | Deaths | Natural change | Crude birth rate (per 1000) | Crude death rate (per 1000) | Natural change (per 1000) | Fertility rates |
|---|---|---|---|---|---|---|---|---|
| 1970 | 386,000 | 5,681 | 3,307 | 2,374 | 14.7 | 8.6 | 6.2 | |
| 1975 | 396,000 | 5,900 | 3,907 | 1,993 | 14.9 | 9.9 | 5.0 | |
| 1980 | 409,000 | 6,610 | 4,828 | 1,782 | 16.2 | 11.8 | 4.4 | |
| 1985 | 423,000 | 6,966 | 5,283 | 1,683 | 16.5 | 12.5 | 4.0 | |
| 1990 | 436,000 | 6,171 | 5,375 | 796 | 14.2 | 12.3 | 1.8 | 2.06 |
| 1991 | 439,000 | 5,912 | 5,905 | 7 | 13.5 | 13.5 | 0.0 | 1.96 |
| 1992 | 444,000 | 5,306 | 5,969 | 663 | 12.0 | 13.5 | -1.5 | 1.73 |
| 1993 | 447,000 | 4,774 | 6,662 | -1 888 | 10.7 | 14.9 | -4.2 | 1.54 |
| 1994 | 449,000 | 4,907 | 6,519 | -1 612 | 10.9 | 14.5 | -3.6 | 1.59 |
| 1995 | 450,000 | 4,798 | 6,475 | -1 677 | 10.7 | 14.4 | -3.7 | 1.55 |
| 1996 | 450,000 | 4,625 | 6,382 | -1 757 | 10.3 | 14.2 | -3.9 | 1.49 |
| 1997 | 450,000 | 4,430 | 6,302 | -1 872 | 9.8 | 14.0 | -4.2 | 1.42 |
| 1998 | 451,000 | 4,340 | 6,245 | -1 905 | 9.6 | 13.9 | -4.2 | 1.38 |
| 1999 | 450,000 | 3,879 | 6,215 | -2 336 | 8.6 | 13.8 | -5.2 | 1.22 |
| 2000 | 448,000 | 4,071 | 6,710 | -2 639 | 9.1 | 15.0 | -5.9 | 1.27 |
| 2001 | 447,000 | 4,212 | 6,566 | -2 354 | 9.4 | 14.7 | -5.3 | 1.31 |
| 2002 | 447,000 | 4,540 | 6,715 | -2 175 | 10.2 | 15.0 | -4.9 | 1.39 |
| 2003 | 446,000 | 4,634 | 6,929 | -2 295 | 10.4 | 15.6 | -5.2 | 1.40 |
| 2004 | 444,000 | 4,648 | 6,645 | -1 997 | 10.5 | 15.0 | -4.5 | 1.37 |
| 2005 | 443,000 | 4,550 | 6,726 | -2 176 | 10.3 | 15.2 | -4.9 | 1.32 |
| 2006 | 441,000 | 4,606 | 6,686 | -2 080 | 10.4 | 15.2 | -4.7 | 1.33 |
| 2007 | 440,000 | 5,210 | 6,454 | -1 244 | 11.8 | 14.7 | -2.8 | 1.50 |
| 2008 | 440,000 | 5,601 | 6,558 | 957 | 12.7 | 14.9 | -2.2 | 1.60 |
| 2009 | 439,000 | 5,513 | 6,219 | 706 | 12.5 | 14.2 | -1.6 | 1.66 |
| 2010 | 439,000 | 5,721 | 6,065 | 476 | 13.0 | 14.1 | -1.1 | 1.70 |
| 2011 | 441,000 | 5,511 | 6,197 | 554 | 12.5 | 13.8 | -1.3 | 1.66 |
| 2012 | 444,000 | 5,700 | 5,924 | 224 | 12.9 | 13.4 | -0.5 | 1.71 |
| 2013 | 445,000 | 5,568 | 5,814 | 246 | 12.5 | 13.1 | -0.6 | 1.68 |
| 2014 | 448,000 | 5,699 | 5,938 | 239 | 12.7 | 13.3 | -0.6 | 1.73 |
| 2015 | 450,000 | 5,613 | 5,841 | 228 | 12.5 | 13.0 | -0.5 | 1.72 |
| 2016 | 453,000 | 5,451 | 5,818 | 367 | 12.1 | 12.9 | -0.8 | 1.69(e) |
| 2017 | 453,000 | 4,758 | 5,734 | 976 | 10.5 | 12.7 | -2.2 | |
| 2019 | | 4,184 | 5,654 | 1,470 | 9.1 | 12.3 | -3.2 | |
| 2020 | | 4,419 | 6,154 | 1,735 | 9.5 | 13.3 | -3.8 | |

=== Ethnic groups ===
According to the 2021 Census, ethnic Russians make up 64.4% of the republic's total population, while the ethnic Adyghe are 25.7%. Other groups include Armenians (3.3%), Kurds (1.2%), Romani people (0.7%) and Ukrainians (0.6%).

| Ethnic group | 1926 Census | | 1939 Census | | 1959 Census | | 1970 Census | | 1979 Census | | 1989 Census | | 2002 Census | | 2010 Census | | 2021 Census^{1} | |
| Ethnic group | Number | % | Number | % | Number | % | Number | % | Number | % | Number | % | Number | % | Number | % | Number | % |
|---|---|---|---|---|---|---|---|---|---|---|---|---|---|---|---|---|---|---|
| Russians | 29,102 | 25.6% | 171,960 | 71.1% | 200,492 | 70.4% | 276,537 | 71.7% | 285,626 | 70.6% | 293,640 | 68.0% | 288,280 | 64.5% | 270,714 | 63.6% | 287,778 | 64.4% |
| Adyghe | 50,821 | 44.8% | 55,048 | 22.8% | 65,908 | 23.2% | 81,478 | 21.1% | 86,388 | 21.4% | 95,439 | 22.1% | 108,115 | 24.2% | 109,699 | 25.8% | 114,688 | 25.7%^{2} |
| Armenians | 738 | 0.7% | 2,348 | 1.0% | 3,013 | 1.1% | 5,217 | 1.4% | 6,359 | 1.6% | 10,460 | 2.4% | 15,268 | 3.4% | 15,561 | 3.7% | 14,810 | 3.3% |
| Kurds | | | | | | | | | 2 | 0.0% | 262 | 0.1% | 3,631 | 0.8% | 4,528 | 1.1% | 5,233 | 1.2% |
| Romani | | | | | | | | | 1,109 | 0.3% | 1,134 | 0.3% | 1,844 | 0.4% | 2,364 | 0.6% | 2,908 | 0.7% |
| Ukrainians | 26,405 | 23.3% | 6,130 | 2.5% | 7,988 | 2.8% | 11,214 | 2.9% | 12,078 | 3.0% | 13,755 | 3.2% | 9,091 | 2.0% | 5,856 | 1.4% | 2,810 | 0.6% |
| Others | 6,415 | 5.7% | 6,313 | 2.6% | 7,289 | 2.6% | 11,198 | 2.9% | 13,939 | 3.4% | 18,752 | 4.3% | 26,355 | 5.9% | 14,093 | 3.3% | 18,403 | 4.1% |

1. 50,304 people were registered from administrative databases, and could not declare an ethnicity. It is estimated that the proportion of ethnicities in this group is the same as that of the declared group.
2. Including 397 Kabardins and 16,133 Cherkess.

=== Religions ===
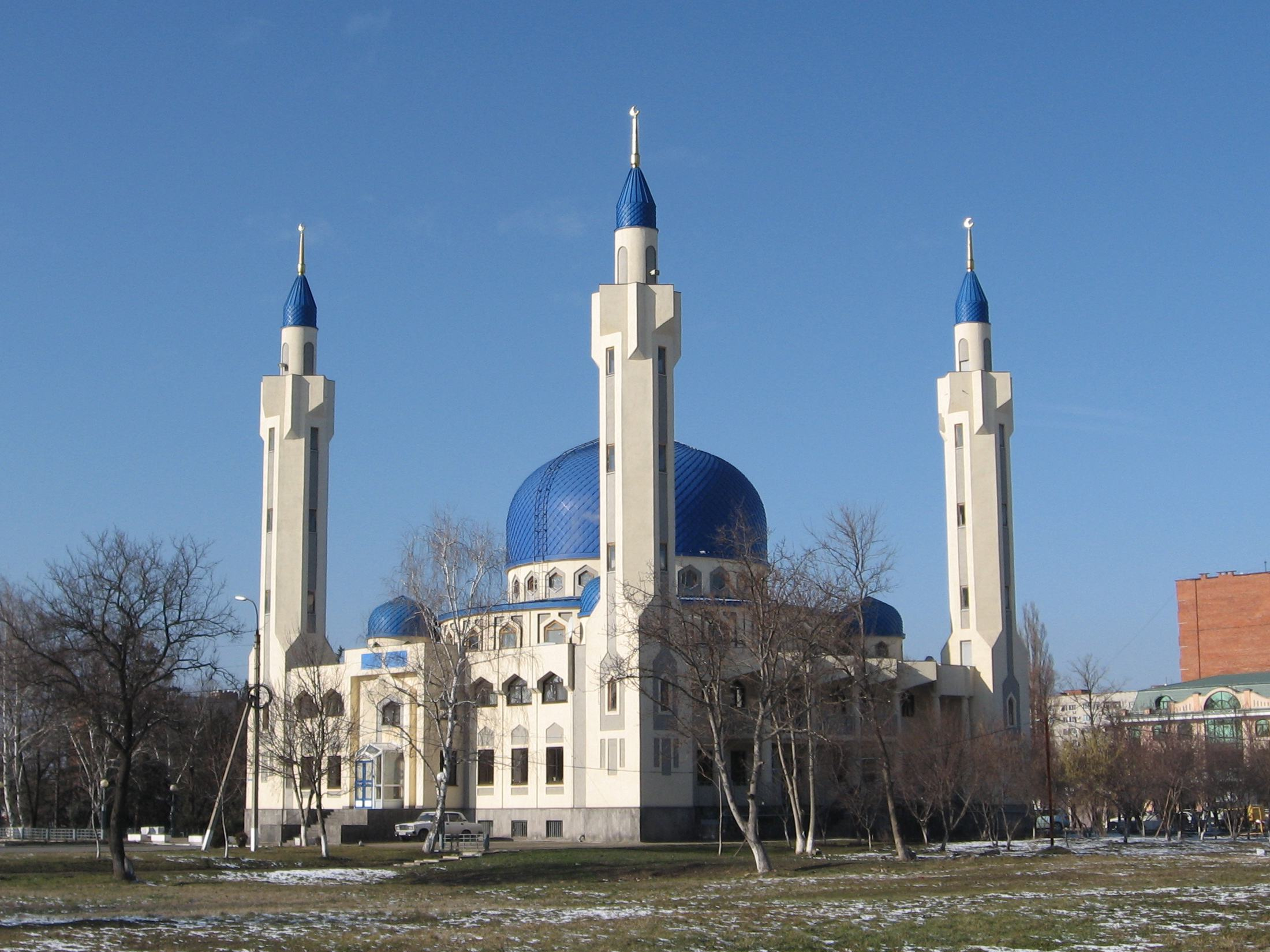
Maykop Central Mosque

Religion in Adygea as of 2012 (Sreda Arena Atlas)
| Russian Orthodoxy | 35.4% |
| Other Orthodox | 1.4% |
| Other Christians | 3.8% |
| Islam | 23.6% |
| Spiritual but not religious | 19.8% |
| Atheism and irreligion | 8.2% |
| Other and undeclared | 7.8% |

According to a 2012 survey which interviewed 56,900 people 35.4% of the population of Adygea adheres to the Russian Orthodox Church, 23.6% to Islam, 3% are unaffiliated Christians and 1% are Orthodox Christian believers who do not belong to church or are members of other Orthodox churches. In addition, 19.8% of the population declares to be "spiritual but not religious", 8% is atheist, and 8.6% follows other religions or did not answer to the question.

=== Education ===
Adyghe State University and Maykop State Technological University, both in the capital Maykop, are the two major higher education facilities in Adygea.

== Economy ==
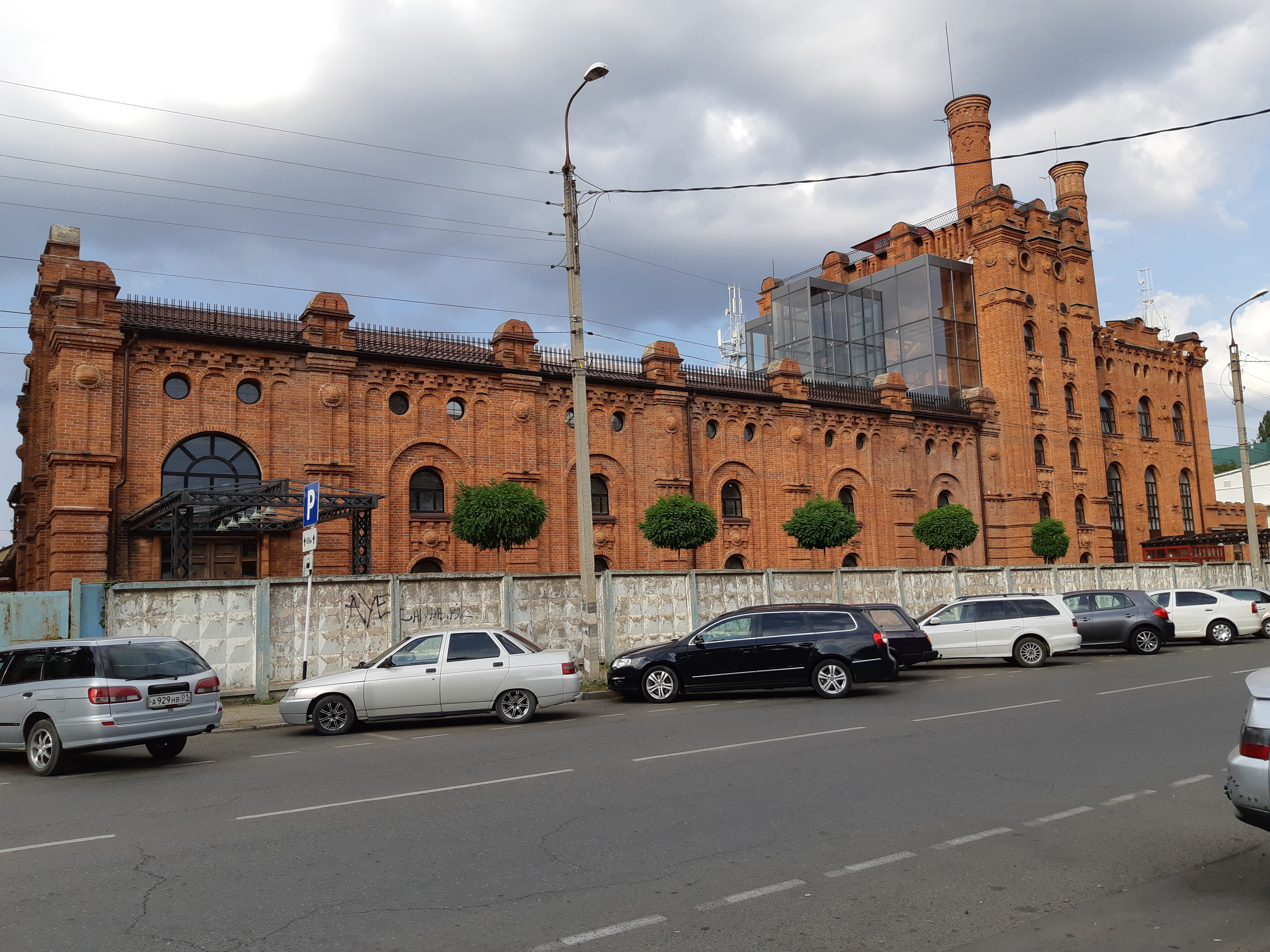
Maykop Beer Brewery

Even though it is one of the poorest parts of Russia, the republic has abundant forests and rich soil. The region is famous for producing grain, sunflowers, tea, tobacco, and other produce. Hog and sheep breeding are also developed.

Food, timber, woodworking, pulp and paper, heavy engineering, and metal-working are the most developed industries.

=== Transportation ===
There is a small airport in Maykop (ICAO airport code URKM). Several rail lines pass through the republic.

== Culture ==
A man speaking Adyghe.

The Adyghe language (Адыгабзэ) is a member of the Northwest Caucasian language family. Along with Russian, Adyghe is the official language of the republic.

There are 8 state and 23 public museums in the republic. The largest museum is the National Museum of the Republic of Adygea in Maykop.

== Notable people ==
- Anatoly Berezovoy (1942–2014), Soviet pilot/cosmonaut
- Aslan Dzharimov (born 1936), first president of the Republic of Adygea
- Anna Kareyeva (born 1977), handball player
- Mukharby Kirzhinov (1949–2026), weightlifter
- Andrei Kobenko (born 1982), footballer
- Nikita Kucherov (born 1993), ice hockey player
- Vladimir Nevzorov (born 1952), judoka
- Hazret Sovmen (born 1937), second president of the Republic of Adygea
- Aslan Tkhakushinov (born 1947), third president of the Republic of Adygea
- Aslan Tlebzu (born 1981), Adyghe folk musician
- Konstantin Vasilyev (1942–1976), painter

== See also ==
- Music in the Republic of Adygea
- Mezmaiskaya cave
- Circassian genocide
