= Kuban (river) =

River in the North Caucasus of Russia

Kuban River
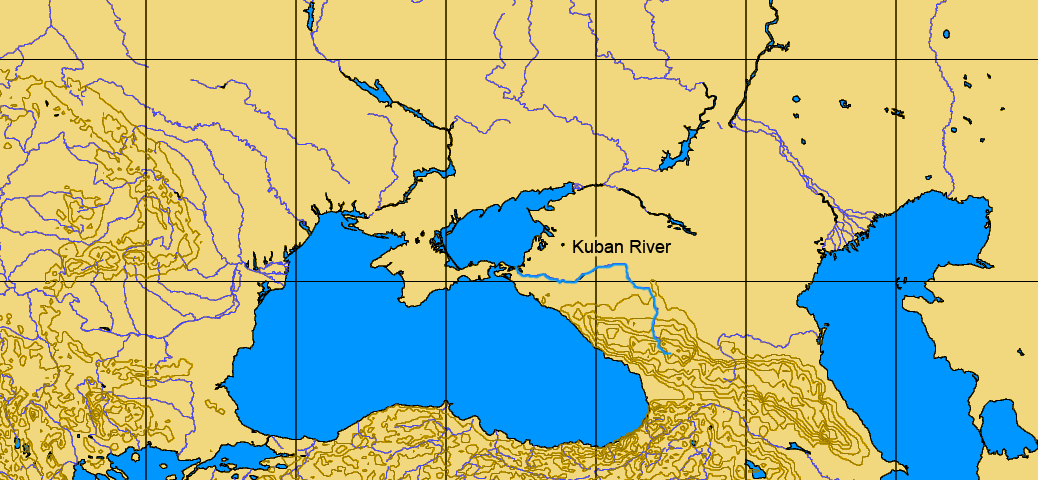

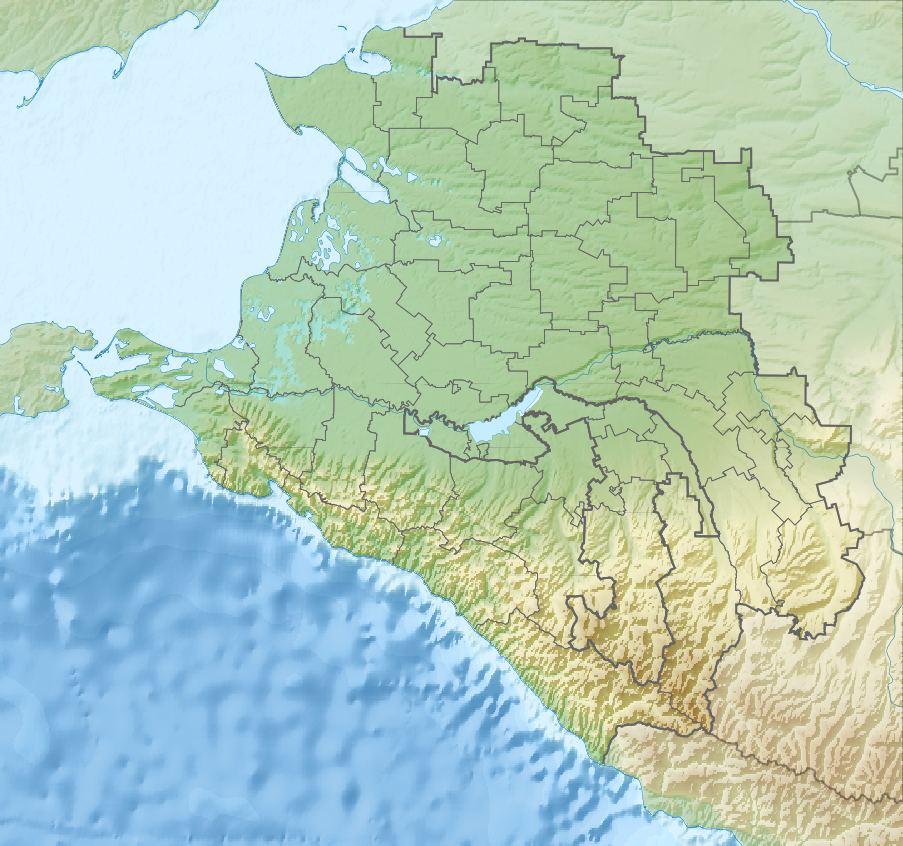

Location
- Location: Eastern Europe
- Country: Russia
- Federal subjects: Krasnodar Krai Karachay-Cherkessia Stavropol Krai Adygea

Physical characteristics
- Source
  - location: Main Caucasian Range; Russia
  - elevation: 3,400 m (11,200 ft)
- Mouth: Sea of Azov
  - coordinates: 45°20′N 37°24′E
  - elevation: 0 m (0 ft)
- Length: 870 km (540 mi)
- Basin size: 57,900 km^{2} (22,400 sq mi)
- Discharge
  - average: 425 m^{3}/s (15,000 cu ft/s) (maximum near Krasnodar)

Basin features
- Tributaries
  - left: Urup, Laba, Belaya

Ramsar Wetland
- Official name: Kuban Delta: Group of limans between Kuban & Protoka Rivers
- Designated: 13 September 1994
- Reference no.: 674

Ramsar Wetland
- Official name: Kuban Delta: Akhtaro-Grivenskaya group of limans
- Designated: 13 September 1994
- Reference no.: 675

The Kuban (Note: Russian: Кубань, Russian pronunciation: [kʊˈbanʲ]; Circassian: Псыжъ, Psyẑ [psəʐ] or Псыжь, Psyź [psəʑ]; Abaza: Къвбина, romanized: Q̇vbina [qʷʼbina]; Karachay–Balkar: Къобан, Qoban; Nogai: Кобан, Qoban; Ukrainian: Кубань, romanized: Kuban) is a river in Russia that flows through the Western Caucasus and drains into the Sea of Azov. The Kuban runs mostly through Krasnodar Krai for 660 kilometres (410 mi), but also in the Karachay–Cherkess Republic, Stavropol Krai and the Republic of Adygea.

The Kuban flows 870 kilometres (540 mi) north and west from its source near Mount Elbrus in the Caucasus Mountains, eventually reaching Temryuk Bay in the Sea of Azov. It is navigable up to Krasnodar. Major cities on the river are Karachayevsk, Cherkessk, Nevinnomyssk, Armavir, Novokubansk, Kropotkin, Ust-Labinsk, Krasnodar and Temryuk. Despite its name, Slavyansk-on-Kuban lies not on the Kuban River, but on its distributary the Protoka.

== Geography and hydrology ==
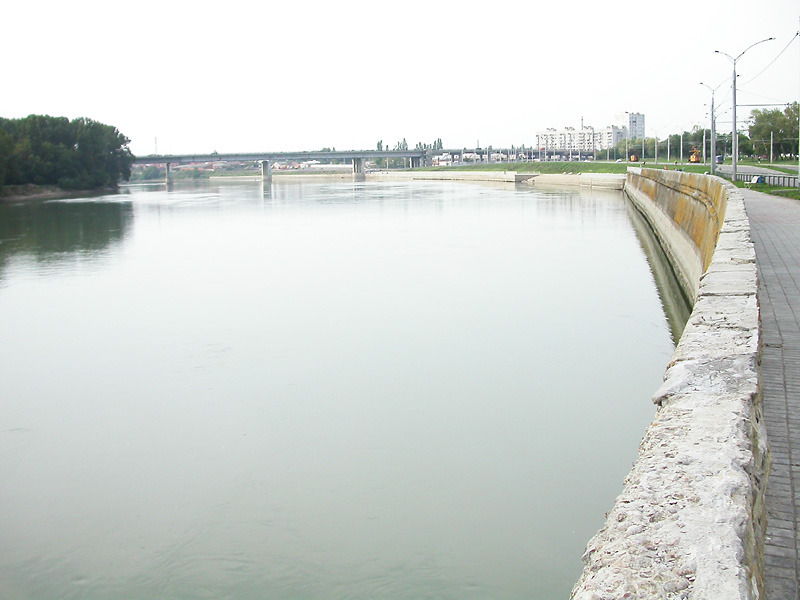
Kuban River in Krasnodar

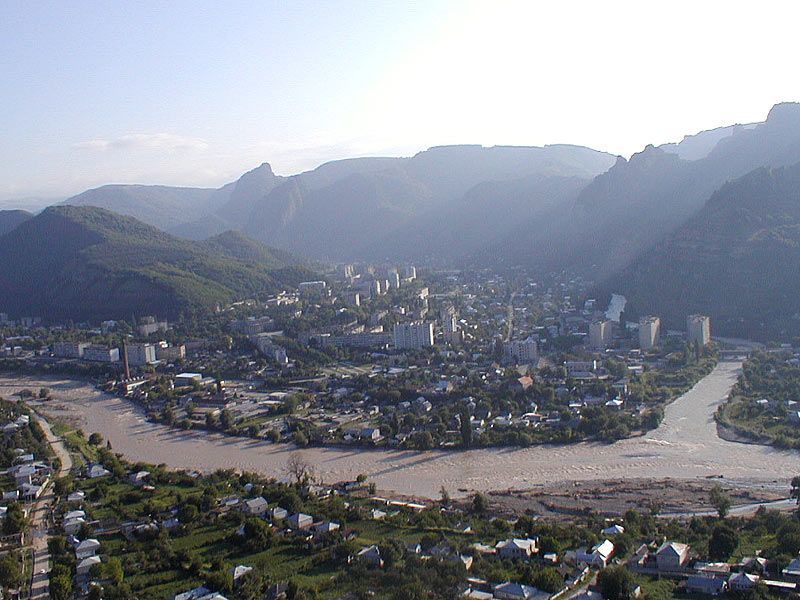
The confluence of Teberda and Kuban near Karachayevsk

The river originates on the slopes of Mount Elbrus and forms at the merger of its two tributaries, the Ullukam and Uchkulam; from the source of the Ullukam to the delta, it has a length of 906 kilometres (563 mi). Between the source and Nevinnomyssk the river flows mostly in the deep and narrow gorge, has many thresholds and rapidly changes its elevation. Near Nevinnomyssk a dam supplies water to the Nevinnomyssk channel. In its central part, until the confluence with the Bolshaya Laba, the Kuban River flows in a wide flat valley with terraced slopes. Then it bends to the west and develops a left-bank floodplain, which is 4 kilometres (2.5 mi) wide near Ust-Labinsk. There it is winding and has many shoals and rapids. Below the mouth of Laba the river widens up to 20 kilometres (12 mi). Between the mouths of the rivers Laba and Afips the Adyghe marshes cover an area of about 300 square kilometres (120 mi^{2}), and below the river Afips, about 800 square kilometres (310 mi^{2}) is occupied by the Zakubanskie marshes. At 116 kilometres (72 mi) from the mouth, the Kuban converges with a major tributary, the Protoka, which is 130 kilometres (81 mi) long. Near its mouth the Kuban narrows to 3 to 4 kilometres (1.9 to 2.5 mi) and then forms a delta covering about 4,300 square kilometres (1,700 mi^{2}). The delta contains numerous limans, some of which have gradually separated from the river. Until the 19th century the Kuban River discharged into both the Black and the Azov seas. However, later, the rising grounds redirected the river entirely to the Azov Sea.

In the upper stream the river is mostly fed by glaciers and high-mountain snow (49%). Near Krasnodar, this contribution drops to 32%; meanwhile, the water supply from the subsoil water increases from 21% to 32%, and that of rainwater from 27% to 32%. The river does not freeze over because of a relatively warm climate and rapid flow in the upper part. The Kuban River is characterized by numerous (6–7 through the year) floods due to rains and thaws, both in the winter and summer. The water level used to fluctuate by up to 5 metres (16 ft), with the maximum in July and the minimum in February. The amplitude of these fluctuations was reduced by construction of the Nevinnomyssk channel and the Tschikskoe, Krasnodar and Shapsug reservoirs. These measures also provided water for fish farming and rice fields.

The average discharge of the Kuban River is at its maximum near Krasnodar at about 425 cubic metres per second (15,000 cu ft/s). It was formerly higher by some 30 cubic metres per second (1,100 cu ft/s) but was lowered by the reservoir construction. The average discharge near Armavir is 163 cubic metres per second (5,800 cu ft/s), and it formerly varied between 0.95 and 1,160 cubic metres per second (34 and 40,965 cu ft/s) before the filling of the Krasnodar Reservoir in the 1980s. The annual outflow to the Azov Sea is about 12 to 13 cubic kilometres (2.9 to 3.1 mi^{3}) of water, 8 million tonnes of sediments and 4 million tonnes of dissolved salts.

The average turbidity is 682 g/m^{3}. Water salinity increases toward the delta; it normally varies between 50 and 400 mg/L and may reach 1000 mg/L in some areas. All major tributaries flow into the Kuban from the left and originate in the Caucasus Mountains. Those tributaries include the Bolshoy Zelenchuk, Maly Zelenchuk, Urup, Laba, Belaya and Pshish.

The main tributaries of the Kuban are, from source to mouth:

- Teberda (left)
- Maly Zelenchuk (left)
- Bolshoy Zelenchuk (left)
- Urup (left)
- Laba (left)
- Belaya (left)
- Pshish (left)
- Apchas (left)
- Psekups (left)
- Afips (left)

== Flora ==
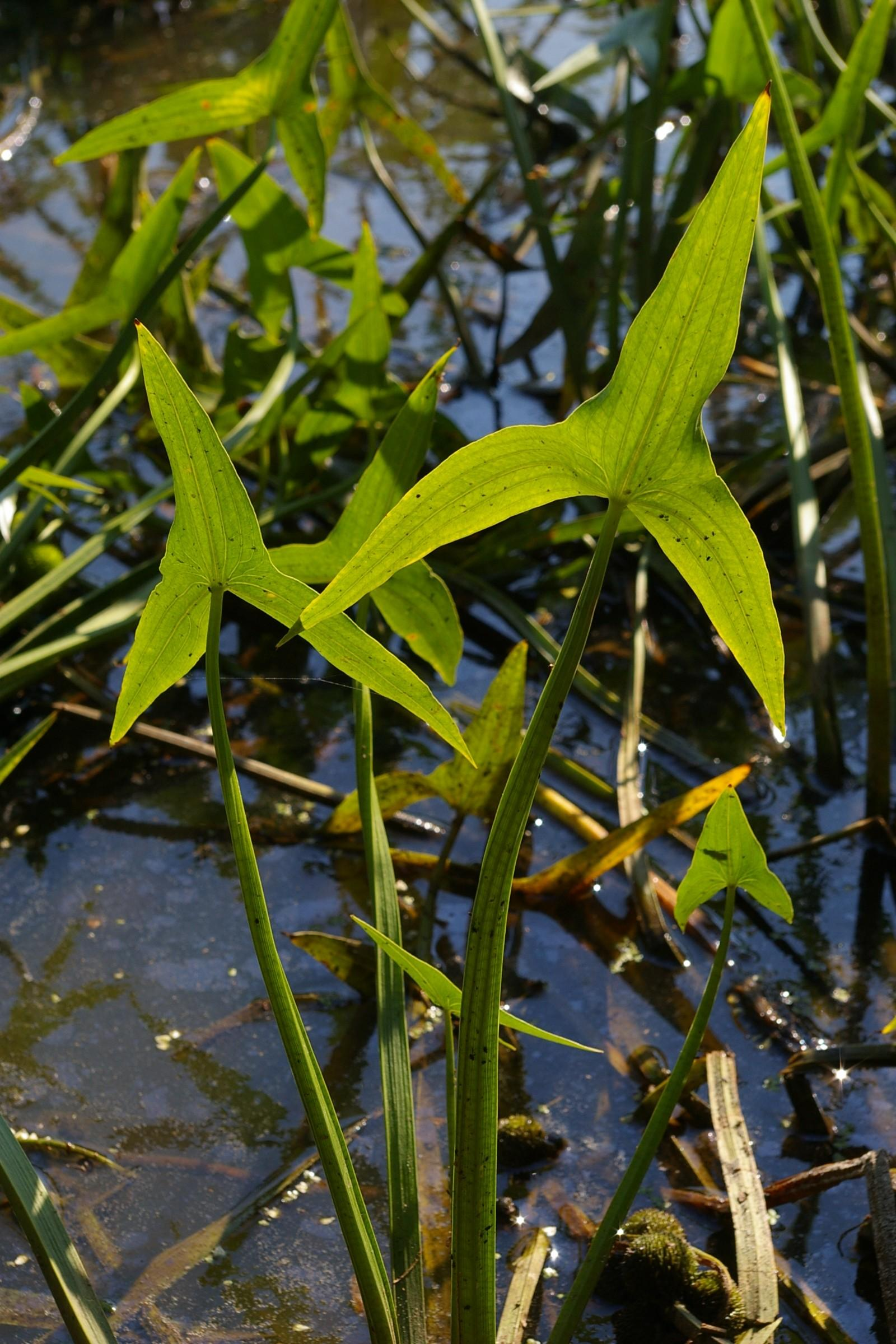
Arrowhead

The river flows through three types of landscape: mixed forests of the Caucasus in the south, Crimean Submediterranean forests in the central part, and steppe in the north. The Caucasus mixed forests are rich in tree species; at mid-elevation, they are dominated by Georgian oak (Quercus iberica), hornbeam (Carpinus caucasica), sweet chestnut (Castanea sativa) and Oriental beech (Fagus orientalis). Higher forests are coniferous and consist of fir (Abies nordmanniana) and spruce (Picea orientalis). The Crimean Submediterranean forests are also coniferous, dominated by fir and spruce.

The vegetation of the delta mostly consists of thickets of reeds, grassweed, sedges, bur-reed and cattail. Less frequent are tape-grasses, grass rush, arrowhead and other water-hungry plants. The estuaries have rich underwater vegetation in the form of stoneworts algae, pondweed, hornworts, lilies and other species. The total area of such vegetation is 40,000 to 50,000 hectares (150 to 190 mi^{2}). Some estuaries contain thickets of lotus which was brought to the area from Africa.

== Fauna ==
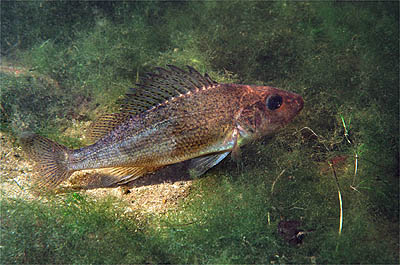
Eurasian ruffe

The wide delta of Kuban, with its abundant estuaries, is especially rich in plankton and benthos. There are about 400 species of zooplankton, including rotifers, copepods, cladocerans, mollusks, worms, etc., providing abundant food for fish. The fish fauna of the Kuban differs from that of the nearby Don and Volga rivers and contains more than 65 species from 16 families. They are dominated by the genera Gobio, Romanogobio, Squalius and Chondrostoma and contain species and genera such as carp, Prussian carp, roach, bream, silver bream, pike, perch, ruffe, Chalcalburnus, Sprattus, Mugil and others. Some species such as silver carp and grass carp were acclimatized in the last decade.

Endemic species include the Kuban barbel (Barbus kubanicus), Gobio kubanicus, Little Kuban gudgeon (Romanogobio parvus), Kuban long-barbelled gudgeon (R. pentatrichus), Kuban nase (Chondrostoma kubanicum), Sabanejewia kubanica, Oxynoemacheilus merga and Aphips chub.

Kuban barbel and Kuban nase are the only species of their genera within the Kuban basin. They prefer mountainous streams with a rapid flow and sandy or rocky bottom on which they spawn. After the construction of the Krasnodar Dam in the 1980s, the Kuban barbel became rare in the lower Kuban. On the contrary, Kuban nase moves downstream to lower sections or larger tributaries in winter. It is rather sensitive to the water quality, especially turbidity. Its population also declined after the construction of the Krasnodar Dam, but is still large in the middle and upper parts of the Kuban and its tributaries.

The Kuban gudgeon and Little Kuban gudgeon are restricted to the sections with moderately fast flow and gravel or sandy bottoms; they are abundant in the middle part of the river. The Kuban gudgeon is unusual by having five anal branched rays. Aphips chub (Squalius aphipsi) occurs in southern tributaries of Kuban and is hiding in small pools in the summer. It spawns in rapid streams 10 to 20 centimetres (4 to 8 in) deep with a pebble or rocky bottom. It does not migrate much, but it moves downstream in winter to find deeper pools and returns upstream in summer. This species is abundant throughout the whole river.

Before the construction of dams, the River had migratory stocks of sturgeons (Acipenser gueldenstaedtii, A. stellatus, Huso huso) and cyprinids (Alburnus mento, Vimba vimba). These species have low presence nowadays.

The delta of the Kuban River and its estuaries are a popular resting ground for various migratory birds, especially waterfowl such as wild geese, ducks, cormorants, pelicans, swans and gray herons. Also abundant are birds of prey, such as falcons, as well as foxes and wild cats. Muskrats were brought to the watershed in the 20th century for commercial fur production.

== Geological history ==
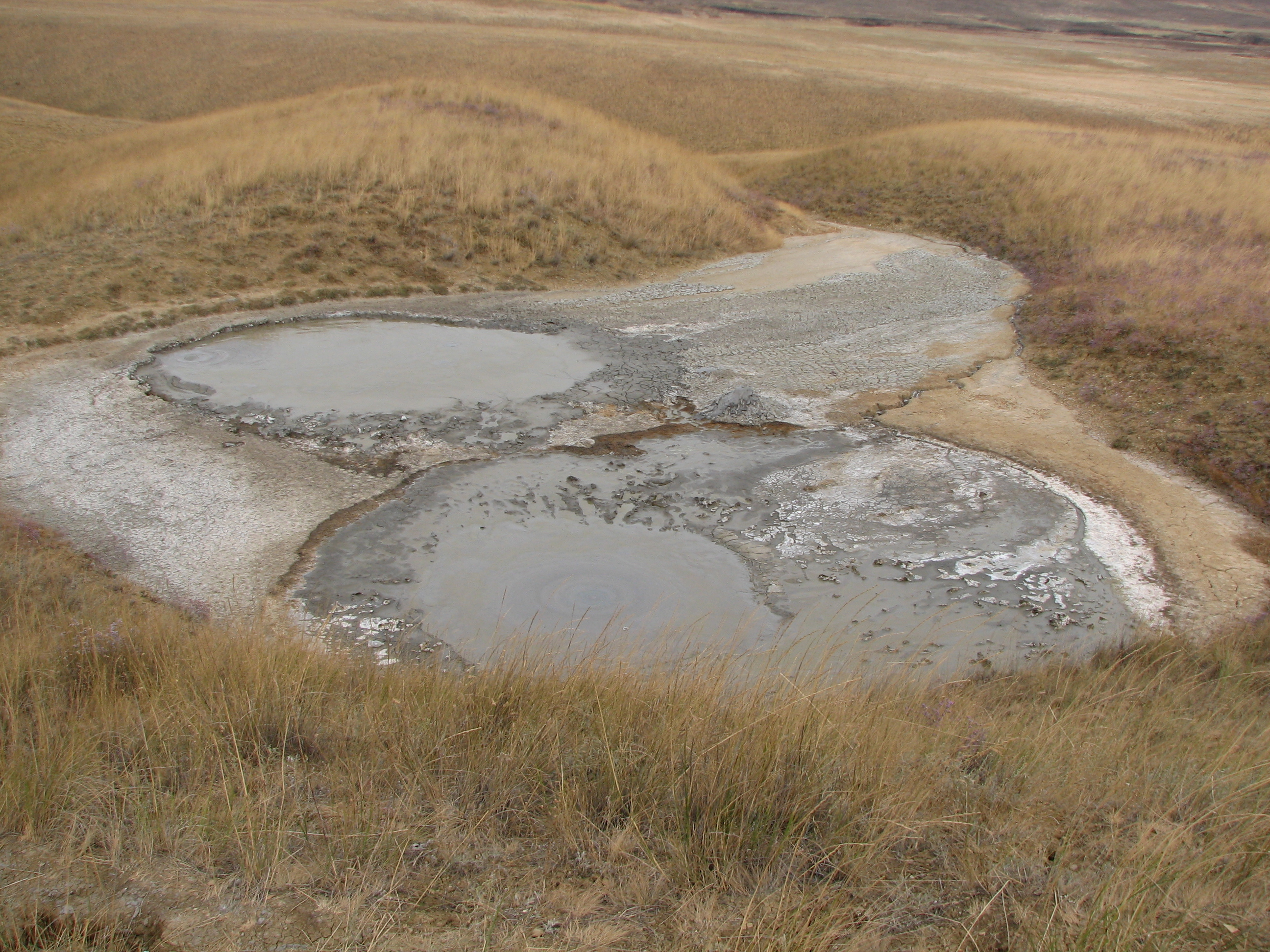
A mud volcano near the delta of Kuban

Tens of thousands of years ago, the Azov Sea was much larger and covered the delta of the Kuban River. Deposition of silt by the Kuban gradually pushed out the sea and shaped the delta with numerous limans and shallow estuaries. Frequent eruptions of the mud volcanoes contributed to this deposition process. There are about 25 mud volcanoes in the area and some are still active.

== Human activities ==
The ancient Greeks called the river Hypanis.

Kuban River gave its name to the Kuban Cossacks who settled in its basin in the 18th–19th centuries. During the Russian conquest of the Caucasus it was part of the North Caucasus Line.

The delta of Kuban is an important rice-growing region of Russia. Also developed here is fishery with the major commercial species including perch, roach and chalcalburnus. The river is navigated up to Krasnodar where it feeds the Krasnodar Thermal Power Plant.
