= Alla, Republic of Buryatia =

Alla Алла
- Ulus
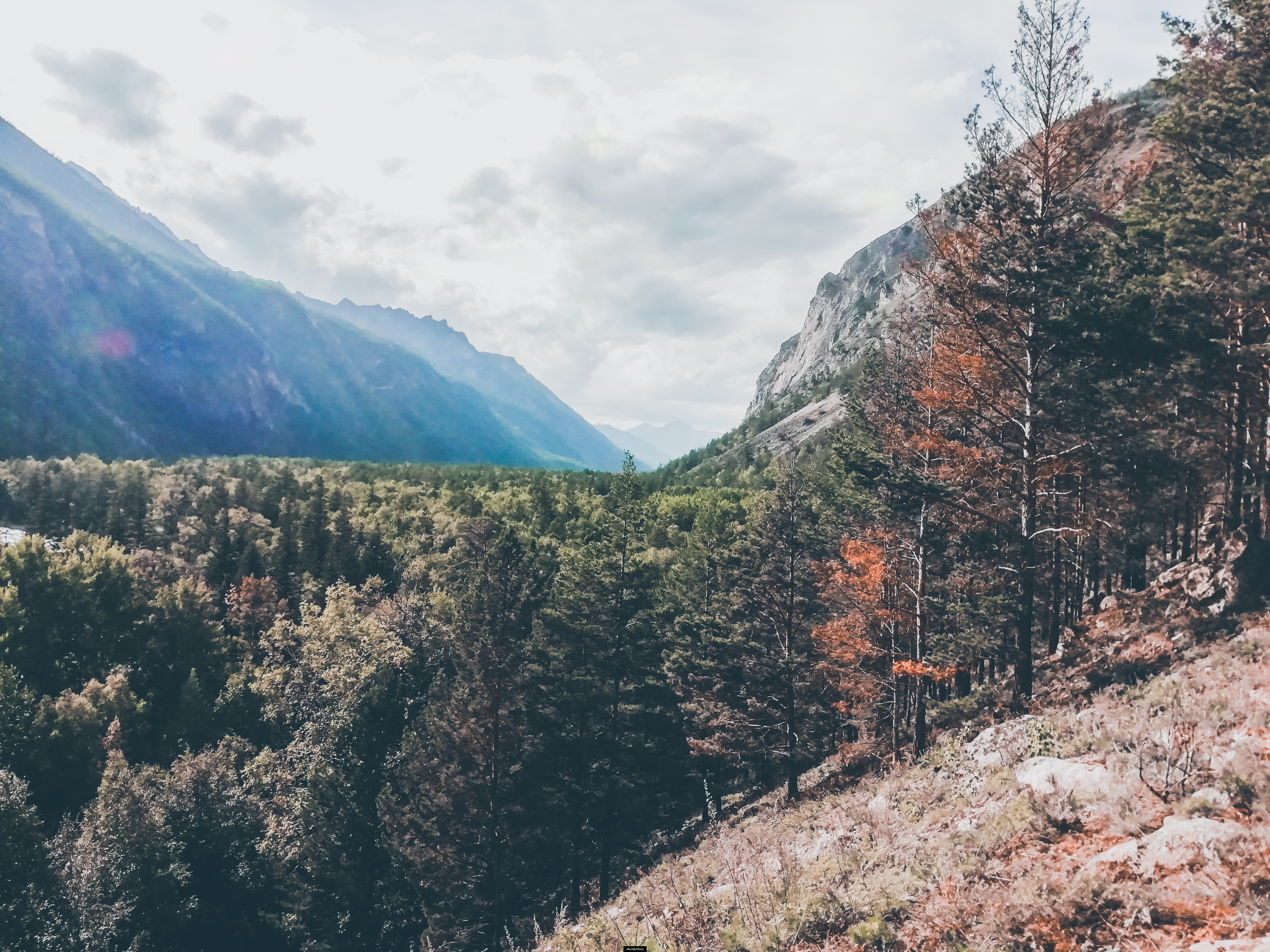
- Near the Alla hot spring

- Location within Republic of Buryatia Location within Russia
- Coordinates: 54°41′N 110°49′E
- Country: Russia
- Region: Republic of Buryatia
- District: Kurumkansky District
- Time zone: UTC+8:00

Alla (Russian: Алла; Buryat: Дэрээн, Dereen; Evenki: Олло, Ollo) is a rural locality (an ulus) in Kurumkansky District, Republic of Buryatia, Russia. The population was 1,080 as of 2010. There are 12 streets.

== Geography ==
Alla is located by the Barguzin River, with the Barguzin Range rising to the west, 55 km (34 mi) northeast of Kurumkan (the district's administrative centre) by road. Maysky is the nearest rural locality.
