= Barguzin =

Barguzin may refer to:

- Barguzin (river), a river in Buryatia, Russia
- Barguzin Range
- Barguzin Nature Reserve
- Barguzin (rural locality), a rural locality (a selo) in the Republic of Buryatia, Russia
- Barguzin class hovercraft
- BZhRK Barguzin, Russian railway-based intercontinental ballistic missile.

== See also ==
- Ust-Barguzin, an urban locality (an urban-type settlement) in the Republic of Buryatia, Russia
