= Maysky, Republic of Buryatia =

Maysky Майский
- Settlement
- Location within Republic of Buryatia Location within Russia
- Coordinates: 54°35′N 110°47′E
- Country: Russia
- Region: Republic of Buryatia
- District: Kurumkansky District
- Time zone: UTC+8:00

Maysky (Russian: Майский) is a rural locality (a settlement) in Kurumkansky District, Republic of Buryatia, Russia. The population was 1,046 as of 2010. There are 12 streets.

== Geography ==
Maysky is located by the Barguzin River, east of Pik Baikal, the highest mountain in the Barguzin Range rising to the west. It is 58 km northeast of Kurumkan (the district's administrative centre) by road. Alla is the nearest rural locality.
