= Arzgun =

Arzgun Арзгун
- Ulus
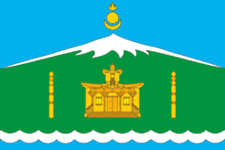
- Flag

- Location within Republic of Buryatia Location within Russia
- Coordinates: 54°22′N 110°44′E
- Country: Russia
- Region: Republic of Buryatia
- District: Kurumkansky District
- Time zone: UTC+8:00

Arzgun (Russian: Арзгун) is a rural locality (an ulus) in Kurumkansky District, Republic of Buryatia, Russia. The population was 796 as of 2010. There are 16 streets.

== Geography ==
Arzgun is located 51 km east of Kurumkan (the district's administrative centre) by road. Zaimka Amatkhan is the nearest rural locality.
