= Taza (ulus) =

Taza Таза
- Ulus
- Location within Republic of Buryatia Location within Russia
- Coordinates: 54°52′N 111°09′E
- Country: Russia
- Region: Republic of Buryatia
- District: Kurumkansky District
- Time zone: UTC+8:00

Taza (Russian: Таза) is a rural locality (an ulus) in Kurumkansky District, Republic of Buryatia, Russia. The population was 36 as of 2010.

== Geography ==
Taza is located 88 km northeast of Kurumkan (the district's administrative centre) by road. Nama is the nearest rural locality.
