= Kharamodun =

Kharamodun Харамодун
- Ulus
- Location within Republic of Buryatia Location within Russia
- Coordinates: 54°12′N 110°30′E
- Country: Russia
- Region: Republic of Buryatia
- District: Kurumkansky District
- Time zone: UTC+8:00

Kharamodun (Russian: Харамодун; Buryat: Хара модон, Khara modon) is a rural locality (an ulus) in Kurumkansky District, Republic of Buryatia, Russia. The population was 73 as of 2010.

== Geography ==
Kharamodun is located 44 km southeast of Kurumkan (the district's administrative centre) by road. Argada is the nearest rural locality.
