= Bulag =

Bulag Булаг
- Ulus
- Location within Republic of Buryatia Location within Russia
- Coordinates: 54°14′N 110°30′E
- Country: Russia
- Region: Republic of Buryatia
- District: Kurumkansky District
- Time zone: UTC+8:00

Bulag (Russian: Булаг) is a rural locality (an ulus) in Kurumkansky District, Republic of Buryatia, Russia. The population was 118 as of 2010.

== Geography ==
Bulag is located 39 km southeast of Kurumkan (the district's administrative centre) by road. Kharamodun is the nearest rural locality.
