= Sakhuli =

Sakhuli Сахули
- Selo
- Location within Republic of Buryatia Location within Russia
- Coordinates: 54°25′N 110°24′E
- Country: Russia
- Region: Republic of Buryatia
- District: Kurumkansky District
- Time zone: UTC+8:00

Sakhuli (Russian: Сахули; Buryat: Сахали, Sakhali) is a rural locality (a selo) in Kurumkansky District, Republic of Buryatia, Russia. The population was 427 as of 2010. There are 8 streets.

== Geography ==
Sakhuli is located 12 km northeast of Kurumkan (the district's administrative centre) by road. Mogoyto is the nearest rural locality.
