= Elesun =

Elesun Элэсун
- Selo
- Location within Republic of Buryatia Location within Russia
- Coordinates: 54°01′N 110°05′E
- Country: Russia
- Region: Republic of Buryatia
- District: Kurumkansky District
- Time zone: UTC+8:00

Elesun (Russian: Элэсун; Buryat: Элһэн, Elhen) is a rural locality (a selo) in Kurumkansky District, Republic of Buryatia, Russia. The population was 583 as of 2010. There are 11 streets.

== Geography ==
Elesun is located 40 km southwest of Kurumkan (the district's administrative centre) by road. Baragkhan is the nearest rural locality.
