= Galgatay =

Galgatay Галгатай
- Ulus
- Location within Republic of Buryatia Location within Russia
- Coordinates: 54°11′N 110°13′E
- Country: Russia
- Region: Republic of Buryatia
- District: Kurumkansky District
- Time zone: UTC+8:00

Galgatay (Russian: Галгатай) is a rural locality (an ulus) in Kurumkansky District, Republic of Buryatia, Russia. The population was 27 as of 2010.

== Geography ==
Galgatay is located 18 km south of Kurumkan (the district's administrative centre) by road. Baragkhan is the nearest rural locality.
