= Yagdyg =

Yagdyg Ягдыг
- Ulus
- Location within Republic of Buryatia Location within Russia
- Coordinates: 54°51′N 111°05′E
- Country: Russia
- Region: Republic of Buryatia
- District: Kurumkansky District
- Time zone: UTC+8:00

Yagdyg (Russian: Ягдыг, Yagdyg; Buryat: Ягдаг, Yagdag; Evenki: Дягда, Dyagda) is a rural locality (an ulus) in Kurumkansky District, Republic of Buryatia, Russia. The population was 64 as of 2010.

== Geography ==
Yagdyg is located 81 km northeast of Kurumkan (the district's administrative centre) by road. Ulyunkhan is the nearest rural locality.
