= Kucheger =

Kucheger Кучегэр
- Ulus
- Location within Republic of Buryatia Location within Russia
- Coordinates: 54°52′N 111°00′E
- Country: Russia
- Region: Republic of Buryatia
- District: Kurumkansky District
- Time zone: UTC+8:00

Kucheger (Russian: Кучегэр; Buryat: Хγшэгээр, Khüshegeer) is a rural locality (an ulus) in Kurumkansky District, Republic of Buryatia, Russia. The population was 48 as of 2010.

== Geography ==
Kucheger is located 86 km northeast of Kurumkan (the district's administrative centre) by road. Ulyunkhan is the nearest rural locality.
