= Pik Baikal =

Mountain in Russia

- Пик Байкал
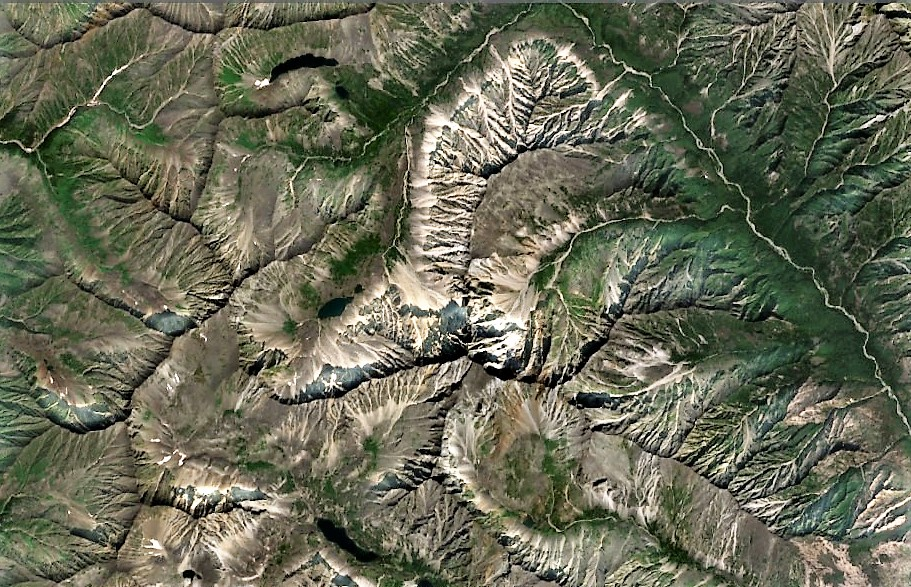
- Pik Baikal Sentinel-2 image

Highest point
- Elevation: 2,841 m (9,321 ft)
- Prominence: 1,723.9 m (5,656 ft)
- Listing: Ultra, Ribu
- Coordinates: 54°37′20.3″N 110°27′23.6″E

Geography
- Location within Republic of Buryatia
- Location: Buryatia; Russian Far East
- Parent range: Barguzin Range, South Siberian Mountains

Climbing
- Easiest route: from Maysky

Pik Baikal (Russian: Пик Байкал) is a mountain in the Barguzin Range, Buryatia, Russian Federation. This peak is located to the east of the eastern shore of neighboring Lake Baikal.

== Geography ==
This 2,841 m (9,321 ft) high peak is not only the highest point of the Barguzin Range, but also the highest summit of the ranges surrounding Lake Baikal.

Pik Baikal is an ultra prominent peak that rises in the eastern flank of the Barguzin Range. Administratively the peak is part of the Kurumkansky District of Buryatia. The Barguzin River flows below the eastern slopes of the mountain.

== See also ==
- List of mountains and hills of Russia
- List of ultras of Northeast Asia
