= Ugnasay =

Ugnasay Угнасай
- Ulus
- Location within Republic of Buryatia Location within Russia
- Coordinates: 54°30′N 110°40′E
- Country: Russia
- Region: Republic of Buryatia
- District: Kurumkansky District
- Time zone: UTC+8:00

Ugnasay (Russian: Угнасай) is a rural locality (an ulus) in Kurumkansky District, Republic of Buryatia, Russia. The population was 35 as of 2010.

== Geography ==
Ugnasay is located 45 km northeast of Kurumkan (the district's administrative centre) by road. Maysky is the nearest rural locality.
