= Arbun =

Arbun Арбун
- Ulus
- Location within Republic of Buryatia Location within Russia
- Coordinates: 54°11′N 110°16′E
- Country: Russia
- Region: Republic of Buryatia
- District: Kurumkansky District
- Time zone: UTC+8:00

Arbun (Russian: Арбун) is a rural locality (an ulus) in Kurumkansky District, Republic of Buryatia, Russia. The population was 8 as of 2010.

== Geography ==
Arbun is located 51 km east of Kurumkan (the district's administrative centre) by road. Amatkhan is the nearest rural locality.
