= Nama, Republic of Buryatia =

Nama Нама
- Ulus
- Location within Republic of Buryatia Location within Russia
- Coordinates: 54°51′N 111°06′E
- Country: Russia
- Region: Republic of Buryatia
- District: Kurumkansky District
- Time zone: UTC+8:00

Nama (Russian: Нама) is a rural locality (an ulus) in Kurumkansky District, Republic of Buryatia, Russia. The population was 93 as of 2010.

== Geography ==
Nama is located 84 km northeast of Kurumkan (the district's administrative centre) by road. Yagdyg is the nearest rural locality.
