= Shamanka, Republic of Buryatia =

Shamanka Шаманка
- Settlement
- Location within Republic of Buryatia Location within Russia
- Coordinates: 54°28′N 110°28′E
- Country: Russia
- Region: Republic of Buryatia
- District: Kurumkansky District
- Time zone: UTC+8:00

Shamanka (Russian: Шаманка) is a rural locality (a settlement) in Kurumkansky District, Republic of Buryatia, Russia. The population was 192 as of 2010. There are 3 streets. It is famous for the archaeological discovery of the Shamanka Canid skeleton found in the nearby Neolithic Siberian burial site. The remains indicate a close human companionship dating to 7,000 BCE.

== Geography ==
Shamanka is located 20 km northeast of Kurumkan (the district's administrative centre) by road. Sakhuli is the nearest rural locality.
