= Dzherginsky Nature Reserve =

Nature reserve in Buryatia, Russia

- Russian: Джергинский заповедник
- IUCN category Ia (strict nature reserve)
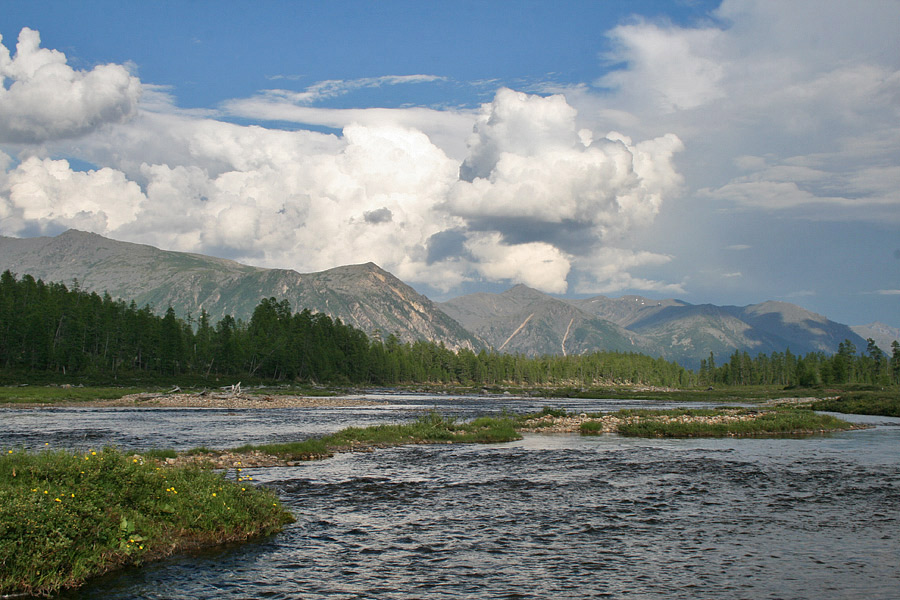
- Dzherginsky Zapovednik

- Location within Russia
- Location: Buryatia
- Nearest city: Ulan-Ude
- Coordinates: 55°6′51″N 111°27′32″E
- Area: 238,088 hectares (588,328 acres; 919 sq mi)
- Established: 1992
- Governing body: Ministry of Natural Resources and Environment (Russia)
- Website: http://www.barguzin-istok.ru/

Dzherginsky Nature Reserve (Russian: Джергинский заповедник) is a Russian 'zapovednik' (strict nature reserve), located about 100 km east of the northern section of Lake Baikal. It covers the source and upper reaches of the Barguzin River, the second largest tributary to Lake Baikal, and is at the junction of three mountain ranges - the Barguzin Range to the west of the reserve, the Ikat Range and the Southern Muya Range. The reserve's mountainous territory is dominated by larch forests. It is situated in the Kurumkansky District of Buryatia. The nearest city, Ulan-Ude, is 560 km to the south. The reserve was formally established in 1992 to protect the biodiversity of the upper Barguzin valley, and to study natural processes of the area. It covers an area of 238,088 hectares (919.26 sq mi).

== Topography ==
The Dzherginsky Reserve covers both mountains and river valleys. The upper Barguzin River valley begins in the southwest of the reserve, the Barguzin Range enters the reserve from the west, the Ikat Range to the east. The territory also covers parts of the South Muya Ridge and the Amutskaya Basin. The valleys and river basins are generally oriented towards the northeast. Glacial origin is evidenced by cirques and lateral moraines in the Barguzin valley. The Barguzin Ridge itself has not been subject to glaciation. The Ikat Ridge (350 km long and up to 100 km wide) intersects the South Muya Ridge within the boundaries of Dzherginsky, and reaches a height of 2,500 m (8,200 ft).

== Climate and ecoregion ==
Dzherginsky is located in the East Siberian taiga ecoregion. This ecoregion covers the area between the Yenisei River and Lena River down to the Okhotsk Sea. Its northern border reaches the Arctic Circle, and its southern border reaches 52°N latitude. The dominant vegetation is light coniferous taiga with Dahurian larch Larix gmelinii forming the canopy in areas with low snow cover. This ecoregion is rich in minerals.

The climate of Dzherginsky is Subarctic climate, dry winter (Köppen climate classification Subarctic climate (Dwc)). This climate is characterized by mild summers (only 1–3 months above 10 °C (50.0 °F)) and cold winters having monthly precipitation less than one-tenth of the wettest summer month. Dzherginsky is far enough from Lake Baikal that the moderating effects of the lake are not felt in the reserve. The important factor within the reserve is altitude. At the valley floor, precipitation is 250–300 mm/year, but up to 1,000 mm/year in the highlands. Temperatures in July can average from 18 °C (64 °F) to 10 °C (50 °F).

== Flora and fauna ==
The flora of Dzherginsky is heavily affected by altitude. At the high-altitudes there are three belts of vegetation: the mountain-steppe at the lowest, mountain taiga in the middle, and higher with alpine sub-zone and bald mountain. In the river valleys the floral communities are those of meadows, in combination with sedge and willow marshes.

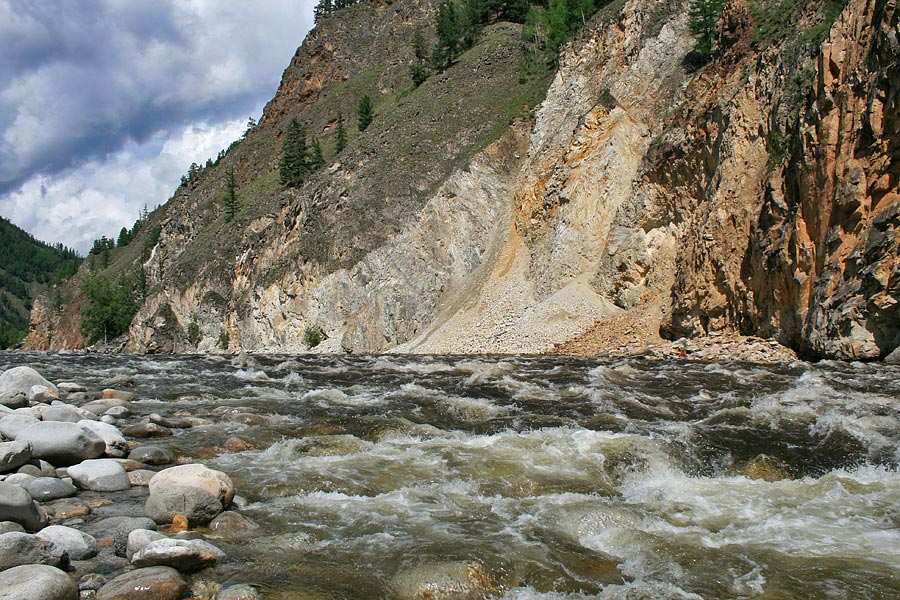
Bargazun River, below Lake Balan-Tamur

The current inventory of animals in the reserve shows 201 species of vertebrate: 6 fish species, 3 of amphibians, 4 of reptiles, 145 of birds, and 43 species of mammals

== Ecoeducation and access ==
As a strict nature reserve, the Dzherginsky Reserve is mostly closed to the general public, although scientists and those with 'environmental education' purposes can make arrangements with park management for visits. There are four significant 'ecotourist' routes in the reserve, however, that are open to the public. These require permits to be obtained in advance. The main office is in the city of Ulan-Ude.

== See also ==
- List of Russian Nature Reserves (class 1a 'zapovedniks')
- National Parks of Russia
