= Khonkhino =

Khonkhino Хонхино
- Ulus
- Location within Republic of Buryatia Location within Russia
- Coordinates: 54°13′N 110°13′E
- Country: Russia
- Region: Republic of Buryatia
- District: Kurumkansky District
- Time zone: UTC+8:00

Khonkhino (Russian: Хонхино) is a rural locality (an ulus) in Kurumkansky District, Republic of Buryatia, Russia. The population was 135 as of 2010. There is 1 street.

== Geography ==
Khonkhino is located 14 km southwest of Kurumkan (the district's administrative centre) by road. Galgatay is the nearest rural locality.
