= Unegetey, Kurumkansky District, Republic of Buryatia =

Unegetey Унэгэтэй
- Ulus
- Location within Republic of Buryatia Location within Russia
- Coordinates: 54°12′N 110°22′E
- Country: Russia
- Region: Republic of Buryatia
- District: Kurumkansky District
- Time zone: UTC+8:00

Unegetey (Russian: Унэгэтэй; Buryat: Yнэгэтэй, Ünegetei) is a rural locality (an ulus) in Kurumkansky District, Republic of Buryatia, Russia. The population was 104 as of 2010. There are 7 streets.

== Geography ==
Unegetey is located 19 km south of Kurumkan (the district's administrative centre) by road. Shadab is the nearest rural locality.
