= Mogoyto =

Mogoyto Могойто
- Selo
- Location within Republic of Buryatia Location within Russia
- Coordinates: 54°22′N 110°27′E
- Country: Russia
- Region: Republic of Buryatia
- District: Kurumkansky District
- Time zone: UTC+8:00

Mogoyto (Russian: Могойто) is a rural locality (a selo) in Kurumkansky District, Republic of Buryatia, Russia. The population was 997 as of 2010. There are 14 streets.

== Geography ==
Mogoyto is located 22 km northeast of Kurumkan (the district's administrative centre) by road. Sakhuli is the nearest rural locality.
