= Tungen, Republic of Buryatia =

Tungen Тунгэн
- Ulus
- Location within Republic of Buryatia Location within Russia
- Coordinates: 54°19′N 110°46′E
- Country: Russia
- Region: Republic of Buryatia
- District: Kurumkansky District
- Time zone: UTC+8:00

Tungen (Russian: Тунгэн) is a rural locality (an ulus) in Kurumkansky District, Republic of Buryatia, Russia. The population was 41 as of 2010.

== Geography ==
Tungen is located 53 km east of Kurumkan (the district's administrative centre) by road. Arzgun is the nearest rural locality.
