= Murgun =

Murgun Мургун
- Ulus
- Location within Republic of Buryatia Location within Russia
- Coordinates: 54°16′N 110°20′E
- Country: Russia
- Region: Republic of Buryatia
- District: Kurumkansky District
- Time zone: UTC+8:00

Murgun (Russian: Мургун) is a rural locality (an ulus) in Kurumkansky District, Republic of Buryatia, Russia. The population was 23 as of 2010. There are 7 streets.

== Geography ==
Murgun is located 10 km (6.2 mi) south of Kurumkan (the district's administrative centre) by road. Zayakhay is the nearest rural locality.
