= Evgeny Chernikin =

Russian zoologist (1928–2009)

Evgeny Mikhailovich Chernikin
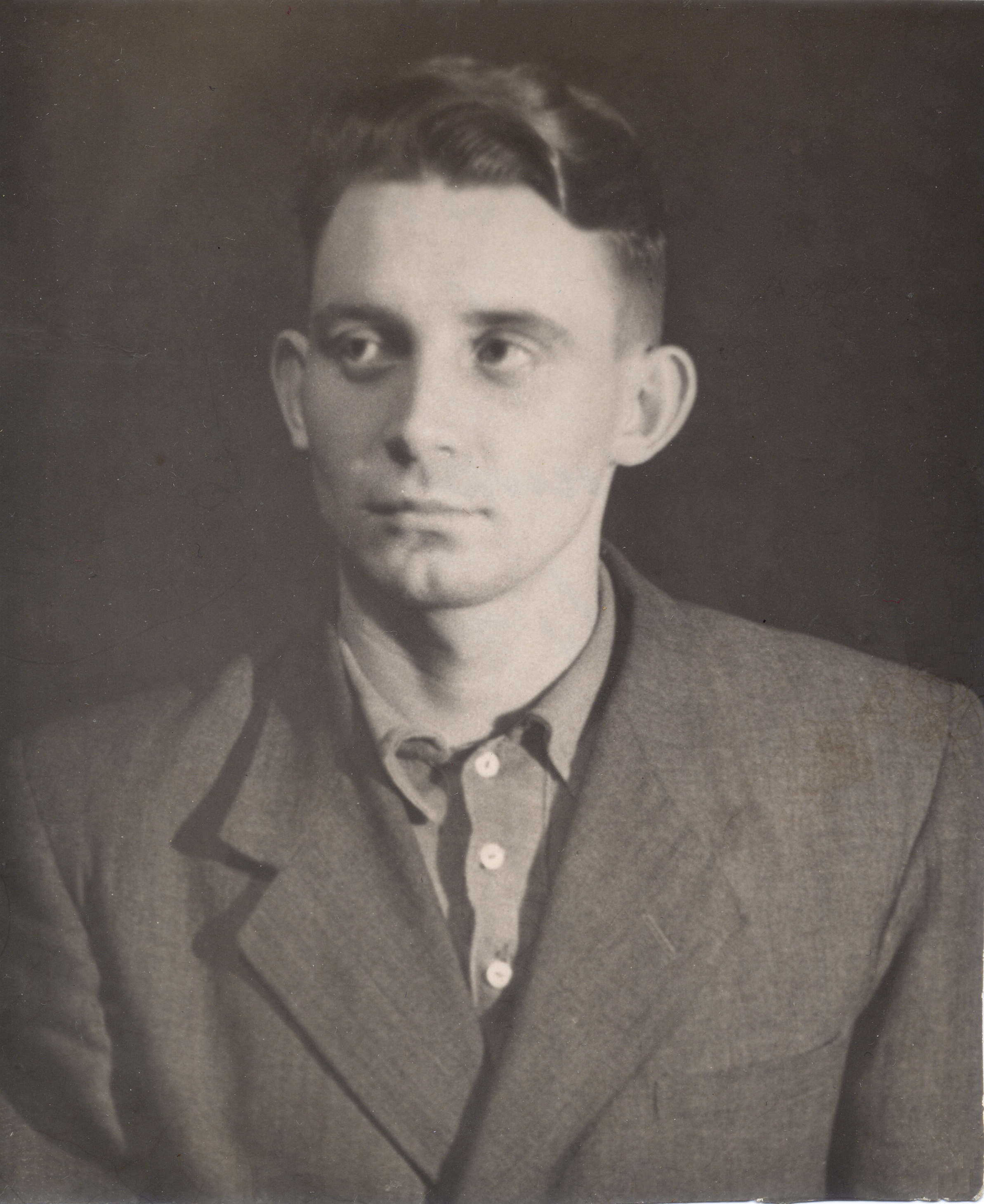
- Chernikin in 1951
- Born: 20 July 1928; Alexandrovka (now Starobilsk Raion), Luhansk Oblast, Ukrainian SSR, USSR
- Died: 17 August 2009 (aged 81); Davsha, Republic of Buryatia, Russia
- Education: Moscow Fur Institute
- Known for: Ecologist of Barguzin Sable; Animal photographer
- Awards: Meritorious Conservation Worker of Republic of Buryatia
- Scientific career
- Fields: Zoology
- Workplaces: Scientific zoologist in Krasnodar, Mary, Dashoguz, Commander Islands 1953–1955; Kronotsky Nature Reserve 1955–1964; Barguzin Nature Reserve 1964–2009

Evgeny Mikhailovich Chernikin (Russian: Евге́ний Миха́йлович Черни́кин, Ukrainian: Євген Михайлович Чорникiн) (20 July 1928 – 17 August 2009) was a Soviet/Russian zoologist and ecologist, known for his works in Barguzin Sable's ecology.

== Biography ==
Chernikin grew up in Pyatigorsk, where he studied at school with known in the future as writer Genrikh Borovik. He graduated from Moscow Fur Institute in 1953. Scientific zoologist in Krasnodar, Mary, Dashoguz, Commander Islands in 1953–1955, Kronotsky Nature Reserve in 1955–1964, Barguzin Nature Reserve in 1964–2009. He was awarded a PhD in agriculture by Irkutsk State University in 1974.

== Family ==
- sister – Olga Mikhailovna Birzul (1935–1967).
- married twice:
1. in 1953 Maria Alekseevna Stepanova (1930–2001), daughter Olga Solomina → grandson Russian genealogist and ethnologist Aleksandr Solomin;
2. in 1968 Ludmila Dmitrievna Remenuk (b. 1936), daughter Alexandra Chernikina → granddaughters Evgenia Krysova and Alexis. His widow Ludmila with their daughter and granddaughters now live in New Zealand.

== List of works (Russian) ==
=== Monography ===
- Черникин Е.М. Экология соболя (Martes zibellina Lunneus, 1758) в Баргузинском заповеднике.- Улан-Удэ, 2006, ISBN 5-85213-900-9

=== Other works ===
- Ананин А. А., Федоров А. В., Черникин Е. М. Фауна Баргузинского заповедника. Земноводные, пресмыкающиеся, птицы, млекопитающие. Аннотированные списки видов. Флора и фауна заповедников СССР. М., 1988, 41 с.
- Бакеев Н. Н., Черникин Е. М., Шиляева Л. М. Хищные. // Итоги мечения млекопитающих. М., Наука, 1980, с. 77–94.
- Черникин Е. М. Отлов и мечение соболей // Охота и охотн. хоз-во, No. 11, 1968, с. 20–21.
- Черникин Е. М. Материалы к экологии баргузинского соболя. // Тр. Баргузин, гос. зап-ка, вып. 6. Улан-Удэ, 1970, с. 7–32.
- Черникин Е. М. Материалы по питанию и размножению бурундука в Баргузинском заповеднике. // Тр. Баргузин, гос. зап-ка, вып. 6, 1970, с. 65–68.
- Черникин Е. М. Основные черты экологии баргузинского соболя. Автореф. канд. дисс. Иркутск, 1974, 24 с.
- Черникин Е. М. Убежища баргузинских соболей. // Охота и охотн. хоз-во, No. 1, 1975.
- Черникин Е. М. К экологии мышевидных грызунов Баргузинского заповедника. // Тр. Баргузин, гос. зап-ка, вып. 7. Улан-Удэ, 1978.
- Черникин Е. М. Материалы к экологии бурого медведя на северо-восточном побережье Байкала. // Бюлл. МОИП, отд. биол., т. 83, вып. 3, 1978, с. 57–66. ISSN 0027-1403
- Черникин Е. М. Мечение баргузинских соболей. // Бюлл. МОИП, отд. биол., т. 85, вып. 5, 1980, с. 10–23. ISSN 0027-1403
- Черникин Е. М. Значение мышевидных грызунов в биоценотических связях позвоночных животных Баргузинского заповедника. // Мелкие млекопит. заповедных территорий. М., 1984, с. 109–112.
- Черникин Е. М. Медведь в Баргузинском заповеднике. // Охота и охотн. хоз-во, No. 12, 1985, с. 12–14.
- Черникин Е. М. Волк в Баргузинском заповеднике. // Охота и охотн. хоз-во, No. 4, 1986, с.9.
- Черникин Е. М. Фартовая весна. Заметки натуралиста. // Охота и охотн. хоз-во, No. 6, 1990, с. 38–41.
- Черникин Е. М. Лесные полевки на Байкале. // Охота и охотн. хоз-во, No. 12, 1990, с. 12–13.
- Черникин Е. М. Подвижность баргузинских соболей. // Охота и охотн. хоз-во, No. 5, 1991, с. 12–15; N 6, 1991, с. 11–14.
- Черникин Е. М. Медведь в заповеднике: год невиданной агрессивности. // Охота и охотн. хоз-во, No. 1, 1995, с. 18–19.
- Черникин Е. М. Соболь в условиях суровой зимы. // Охота и охотн. хоз-во, No. 5, 1996, с. 43.
- Черникин Е. М., Гусев О. К. «Чашу эту мимо пронеси». // Охота и охотн. хоз-во, No. 4, 1998, с. 12–14.
