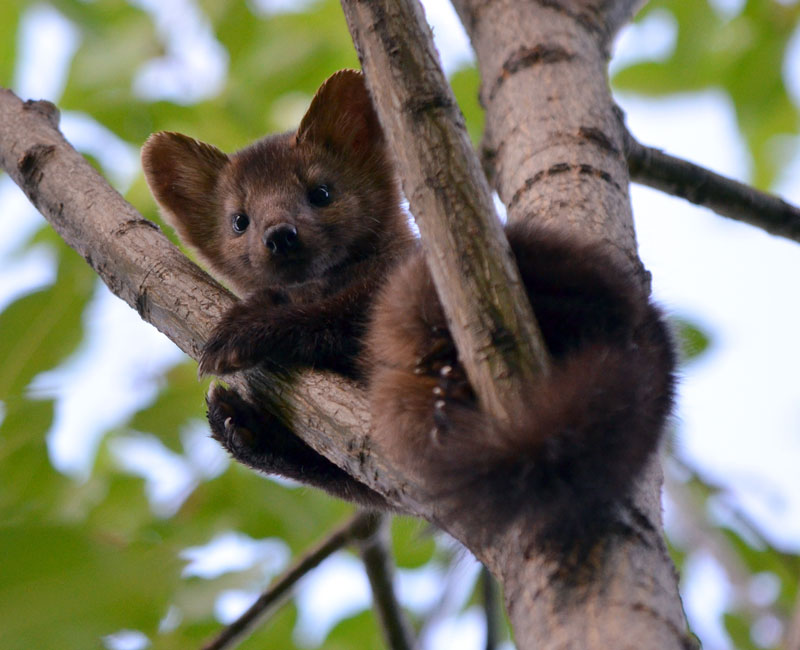

Conservation status
- Least Concern (IUCN 3.1)

Scientific classification
- Kingdom: Animalia
- Phylum: Chordata
- Class: Mammalia
- Order: Carnivora
- Family: Mustelidae
- Genus: Martes
- Species: M. zibellina

Binomial name
- Martes zibellina (Linnaeus, 1758)
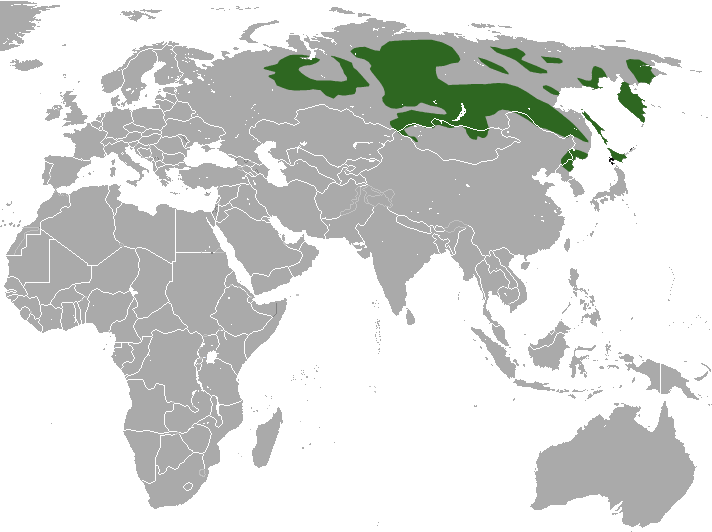
- Sable range Extant Extinct

Synonyms
- Mustela zibellina Linnaeus, 1758; Crocutictis zibellina

= Sable =

Species of marten

The sable (Martes zibellina) is a species of marten, a small omnivorous mammal primarily inhabiting the forest environments of Russia, from the Ural Mountains throughout Siberia, and northern Mongolia. Its habitat also borders eastern Kazakhstan, China, North Korea, and Hokkaido, Japan.

The sable's fur ranges from light to dark brown. Its head is elongated with long ears. It is a skilled climber and primarily hunts by sound and scent. Mating occurs between June and August, and litters typically have two or three offspring. Sable fur has been highly valued in the fur trade since the early Middle Ages, and its popularity has driven hunting and conservation efforts. Today, sable fur is often used to decorate clothing items. It has been categorised as Least Concern on the IUCN Red List.

== Etymology ==
The name sable appears to be of Slavic origin and entered most Western European languages via the early medieval fur trade. Thus the Russian соболь (sobol') and Polish soból became the German Zobel, Dutch sabel; the French zibeline, Spanish cibelina, cebellina, Finnish soopeli, Portuguese zibelina and Medieval Latin zibellina derive from the Italian form (zibellino). The English and Medieval Latin word sabellum comes from the Old French sable or saible.

== Description ==
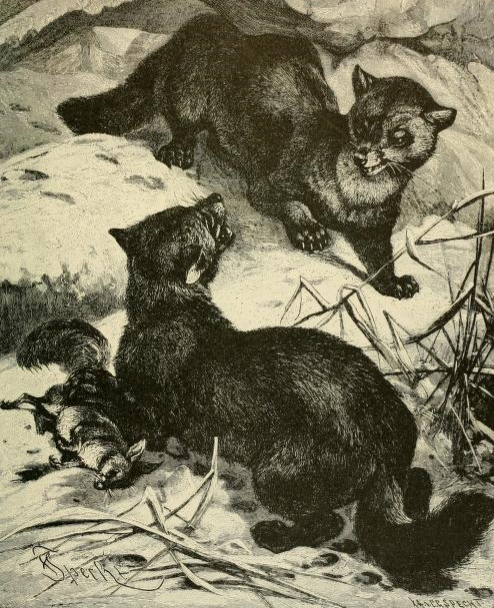
Illustration from Brehm's Life of Animals

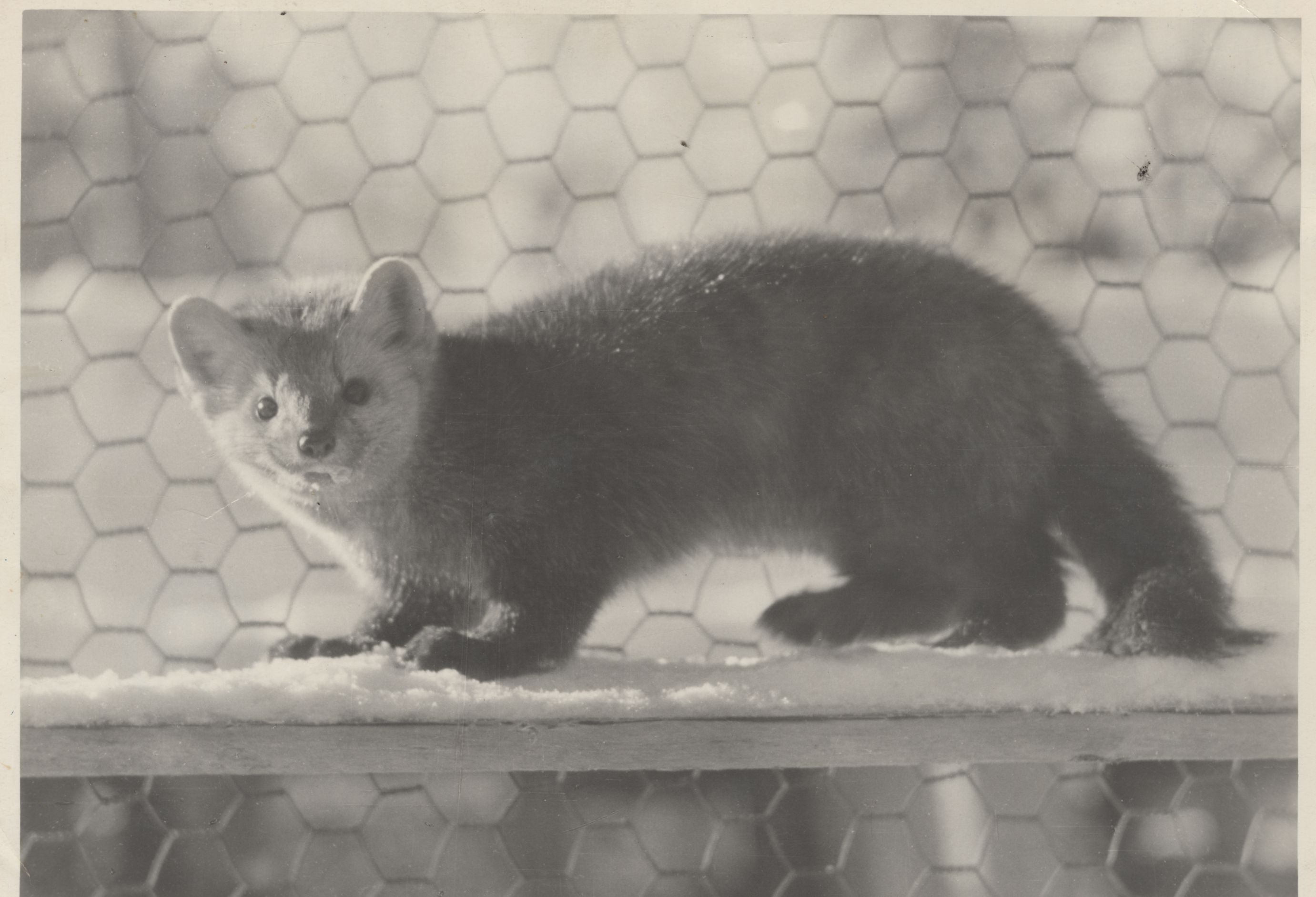
A sable held in captivity

Males measure 38–56 cm (15–22 in) in body length, with a tail measuring 9–12 cm (3.5–4.7 in), and weigh 880–1,800 grams (31–63 oz). Females have a body length of 35–51 cm (14–20 in), with a tail length of 7.2–11.5 cm (2.8–4.5 in). The winter pelage is longer and more luxurious than the summer coat. Different subspecies display geographic variations of fur colour, which ranges from light to dark brown, with individual coloring being lighter ventrally and darker on the back and legs. Japanese sables in particular are marked with black on their legs and feet. Individuals also display a light patch of fur on their throat which may be gray, white, or pale yellow. The fur is softer and silkier than that of American martens. Sables greatly resemble pine martens in size and appearance, but have more elongated heads, longer ears and proportionately shorter tails. Their skulls are similar to those of pine martens, but larger and more robust with more arched zygomatic arches.

== Distribution and habitat ==
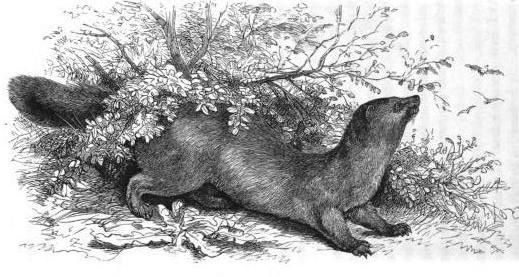
A Russian sable, as illustrated in The Trapper's Guide, 1867. The Russian variety yields the most valuable sable fur.

In Russia, the sable's distribution is largely the result of mass re-introductions involving 19,000 animals between 1940 and 1965. Its range extends northward to the tree line, and extends south to 55–60° latitude in western Siberia, and 42° in the mountainous areas of eastern Asia. Its western distribution encompasses the Ural Mountains, where it is sympatric with the European pine marten. It also occurs on Sakhalin.

In Mongolia, the sable occurs in the Altai Mountains and in the surrounding forests of Lake Hovsgol, the latter being contiguous with the Transbaikal boreal forest region from which the most valuable sable pelts come. In China, it occurs in a limited area of the Xinjiang Uygur Autonomous Region. In northeastern China, it is now limited to the Greater Khingan Range. In eastern Heilongjiang, it persists in the Lesser Khingan Range and also occurs in Hokkaido and on the Korean peninsula.

Because of the variable appearance of the sable in different geographic localities, there has been some debate over the exact number of subspecies that can be clearly identified. Mammal Species of the World recognises seventeen different subspecies, but other recent scholarly sources have identified anything from seven to thirty.

== Behaviour and ecology ==
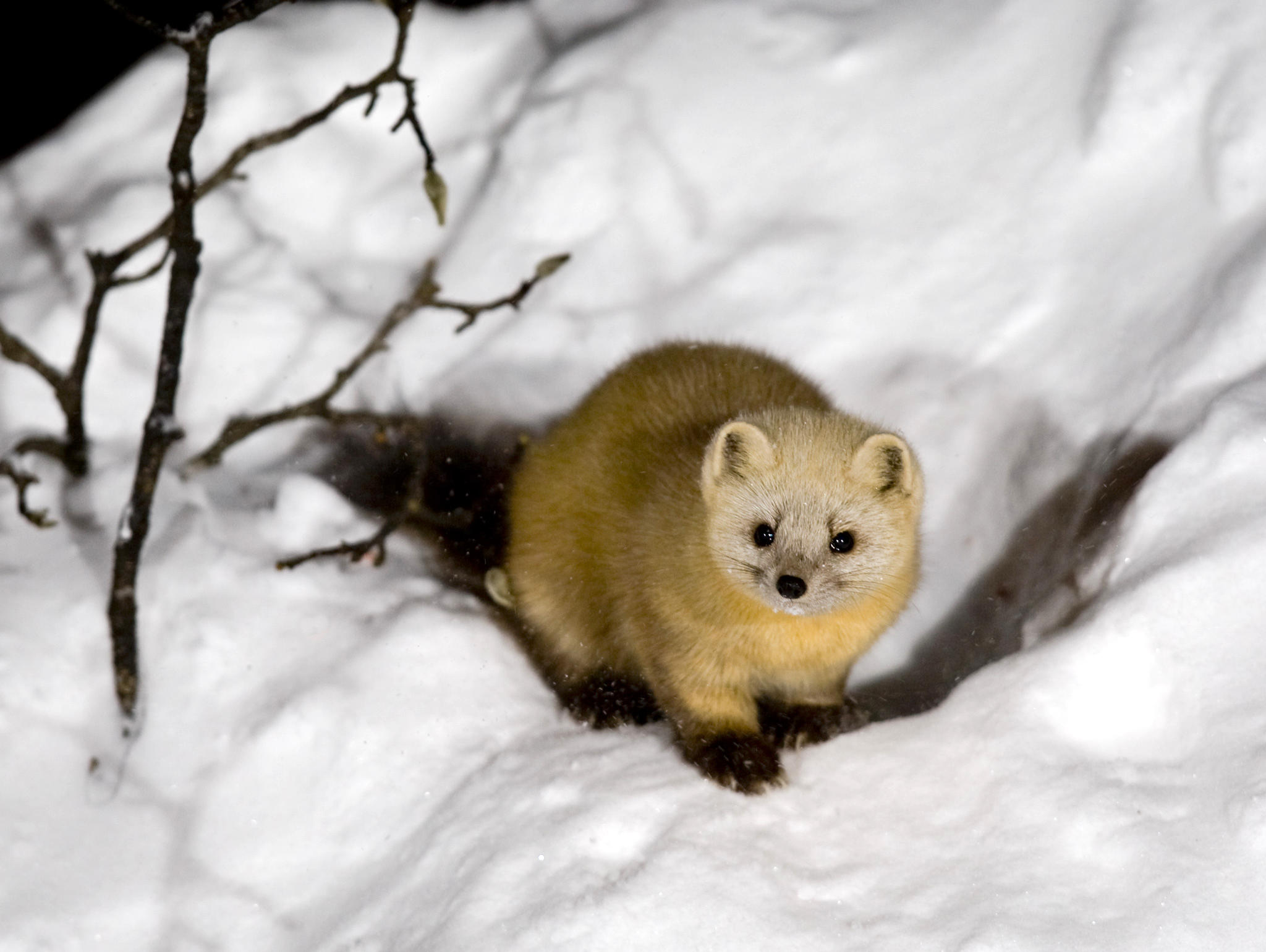
Japanese sable in Hokkaido

The sable inhabits dense forests dominated by spruce, pine, larch, Siberian cedar, and birch in both lowland and mountainous terrain. Its home range is estimated at 4 to 30 km^{2} (1.5 to 11.6 sq mi) in size, depending on local terrain and food availability. However, when resources are scarce, it moves considerable distances in search of food, with travel rates of 6 to 12 km (4 to 7 mi) per day having been recorded.

The sable lives in burrows near riverbanks and in the thickest parts of woods. These burrows are commonly made more secure by being dug among tree roots. It is a good climber of cliffs and trees. It is primarily crepuscular, hunting during the hours of twilight, but becomes more active in the day during the mating season. Its dens are well hidden, and lined by grass and shed fur, but may be temporary, especially during the winter, when the animal travels more widely in search of prey.

The sable is an omnivore, and its diet varies seasonally. In the summer, it consumes large numbers of mountain hare and other small mammals. In winter, when it is confined to its retreat by frost and snow, it feeds on wild berries, rodents, hares, and even small musk deer. It also hunts stoat, small weasels and birds. Sometimes, it follows the tracks of wolves and bears and feeds on the remains of their kills. It eats gastropods such as slugs, which it rubs on the ground in order to remove the mucus. It occasionally eats fish, which it catches with its front paws. It hunts primarily by sound and scent, and it has an acute sense of hearing. It marks its territory with scent produced in scent glands on the abdomen.

Predators of the sable include a number of larger carnivores, such as wolves, foxes, wolverines, tigers, lynxes, eagles and large owls.

=== Reproduction ===
Mating generally occurs between June and August 15, though the date varies geographically. When courting, sables run, jump and "rumble" like cats. Males dig metre long shallow grooves in the snow, frequently accompanied by urination. Males fight each other violently for females. Females enter estrus in spring. Mating can last as long as eight hours. After insemination, the blastocyst does not implant into the uterine wall of the female. Instead, implantation occurs eight months later; although gestation lasts 245 to 298 days, embryonic development requires only 25–30 days. Sables give birth in tree hollows, where they build nests composed of moss, leaves, and dried grass. Litters number one to seven young, although litters of two or three are most common. Males assist females by defending their territories and providing food.

Sable offspring is born with eyes closed and skin covered in a very thin layer of hair. Newborn cubs weigh between 25 and 35 g (0.9 and 1.2 oz) and average 10 to 12 cm (4 to 5 in) in length. They open their eyes between 30 and 36 days, and leave the nest shortly afterwards. At seven weeks, the young are weaned and given regurgitated food. They reach sexual maturity at the age of two years. They have been reported to live for up to twenty two years on fur farms, and up to eighteen years in the wild.

==== Kidus ====
The sable can interbreed with the pine marten. This has been observed in the wild, where the two species overlap in the Ural Mountains, and is sometimes deliberately encouraged on fur farms. The resulting hybrid, referred to as a kidus, is slightly smaller than a pure sable, with coarser fur, but otherwise similar markings, and a long bushy tail. Kiduses are typically sterile, although there has been one recorded instance of a female kidus successfully breeding with a male pine marten.

== History of fur use and status ==
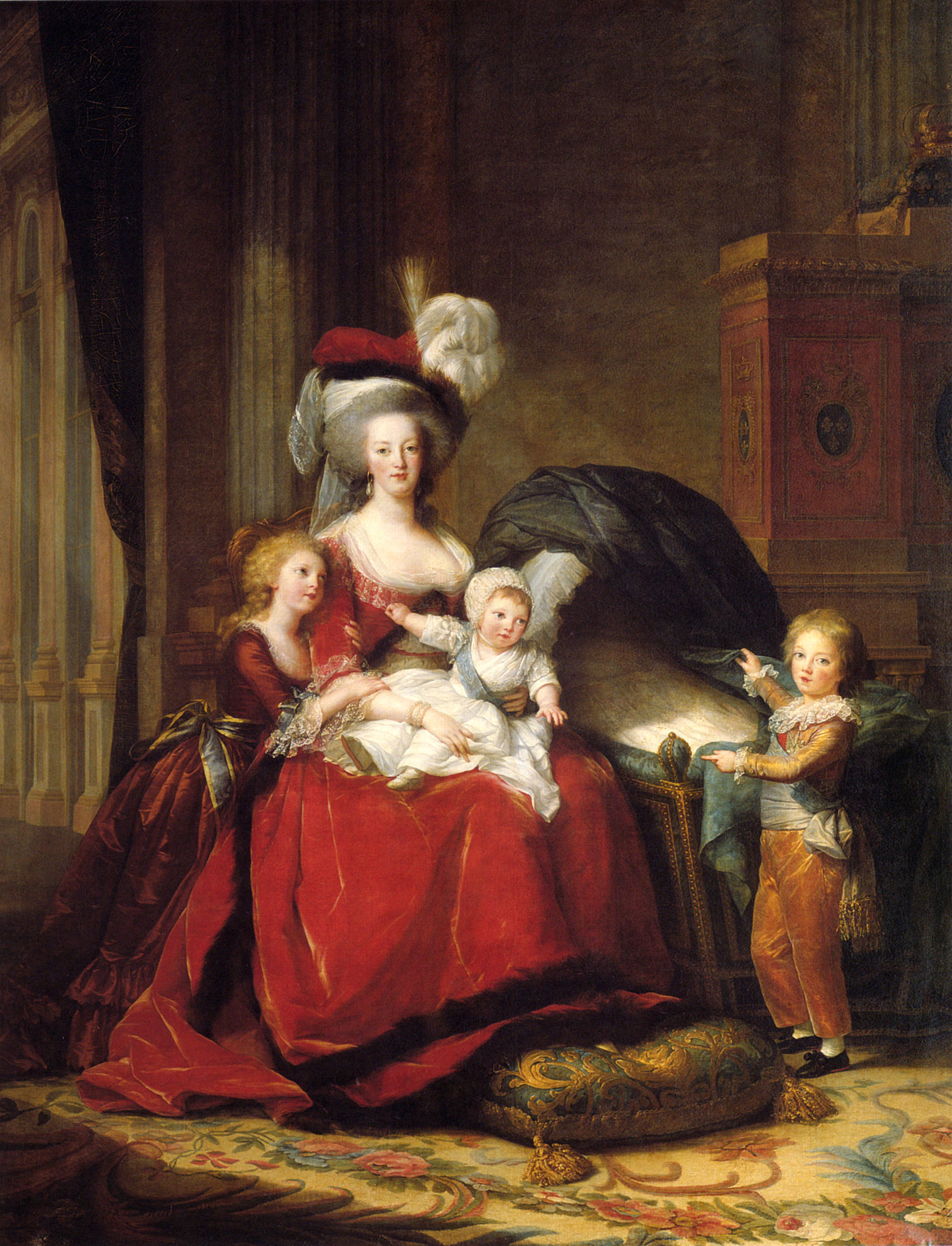
Marie Antoinette de Lorraine-Habsbourg and Her Children by Élisabeth-Louise Vigée-Le Brun (1787) Versailles, Musée national du Château et des Trianons The Queen is shown wearing a dress and a pouf trimmed with sable.

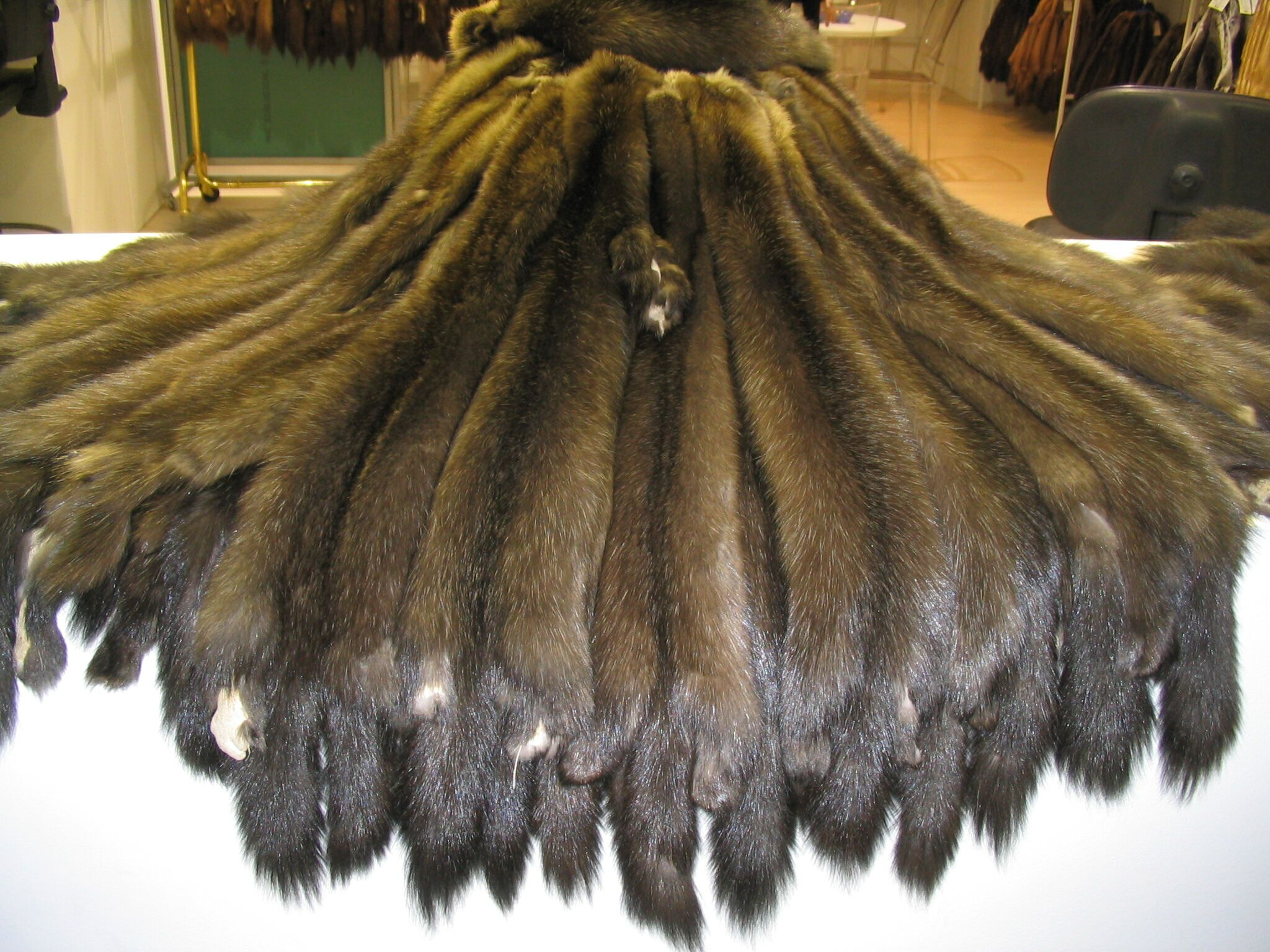
Sable fur skins in Milan. The price corresponds with the upper coat's abundance of glossy blackness.

Sable fur has been a highly valued item in the fur trade since the early Middle Ages, and is generally considered to have the most beautiful and richly tinted pelt among martens. Sable fur is unique because it retains its smoothness in every direction it is stroked. The fur of other animals feels rough stroked against the grain. A wealthy 17th-century Russian diplomat once described the sable as "A beast that the Ancient Greeks and Romans called the Golden Fleece." Russian sables would typically be skinned over the mouth with no incision being made on the body. The feet would be retained, so as to keep as much fur as possible. Byzantine priests would wear sable for their rituals.

In England, sable fur was held in great esteem. Henry I was presented with a wreath of black sable by the Bishop of Lincoln, for no less than £100, a considerable sum at the time. Sable fur was a favourite of Henry VIII, who once received five sets of sable fur worth £400 from Emperor Charles V. Henry later decreed that sable fur was to be worn only by nobles exceeding the rank of viscount. The Russian conquest of Siberia was largely spurred by the availability of sables there. Ivan Grozny once demanded an annual tribute of 30,000 sable pelts from the newly conquered Kazan Tatars, though they never sent more than a thousand, as Russia at the time was unable to enforce the tribute due to wars with Sweden and Poland. The best skins were obtained in Irkutsk and Kamchatka.

According to the Secret History of the Mongols, when Genghis Khan married his first wife, Börte Ujin, his mother Hoelun received a coat of sable furs from the girl's parents. This was reportedly a very noble gift, serving not only an aesthetic need but also a practical one. Shortly after, when the young Shigi Qutuqu was found wandering a destroyed Tatar camp, he was recognised to be of noble descent because of his sable-lined silk jerkin.

According to Atkinson's Travels in Asiatic Russia, Barguzin, on Lake Baikal, was famed for its sables. The fur of this population is a deep jet black with white tipped hair. Eighty to ninety dollars were sometimes demanded by hunters for a single skin. In 1916, the first nature reserve in the Russian Empire was created—known as the Barguzin Nature Reserve—precisely to preserve and increase the numbers of Barguzin sable. Sable fur would continue to be the most favoured fur in Russia, until the discovery of sea otters in the Kamchatka peninsula, whose fur was considered even more valuable. Sable furs were coveted by the nobility of the Russian Empire, with very few skins ever being found outside the country during that period. Some, however, would be privately obtained by Jewish traders and brought annually to the Leipzig fair. Sometimes, sable hunting was a job given to convicts exiled to Siberia.

Imperial Russian fur companies produced 25,000 skins annually, with nearly ninety percent of the produce being exported to France and Germany. The civic robes of the Lord Mayor and Corporation of London, which were worn on State occasions, were trimmed with sable. As with minks and martens, sables were commonly caught in steel traps. Intensified hunting in Russia in the 19th and early 20th century caused a severe-enough decline in numbers that a five-year ban on hunting was instituted in 1935, followed by a winter-limited licensed hunt. These restrictions together with the development of sable farms have allowed the species to recolonise much of its former range and attain healthy numbers.

The Soviet Union allowed Old Believer communities to continue their traditional way of life on the condition that they hand over all sable skins they produced. The dissolution of the Soviet Union led to an increase of hunting and poaching in the 1990s, in part because wild caught Russian furs are considered the most luxurious and demand the highest prices on the international market. Currently, the species has no special conservation status according to the IUCN Red List, though the isolated Japanese subspecies M. zibellina brachyurus is listed as "data-deficient".

Sable fur remains highly valued and is integrated into various clothing fashion items. It is used to decorate collars, sleeves, hems and hats (see, for example the shtreimel). The so-called kolinsky sable-hair brushes used for watercolour or oil painting are not manufactured from sable hair, but from that of the Siberian weasel.
