= Barguzinsky Nature Reserve =

Nature reserve in Buryatia, Russia

Coordinates: 54°30′N 109°50′E

- IUCN category Ia (strict nature reserve)
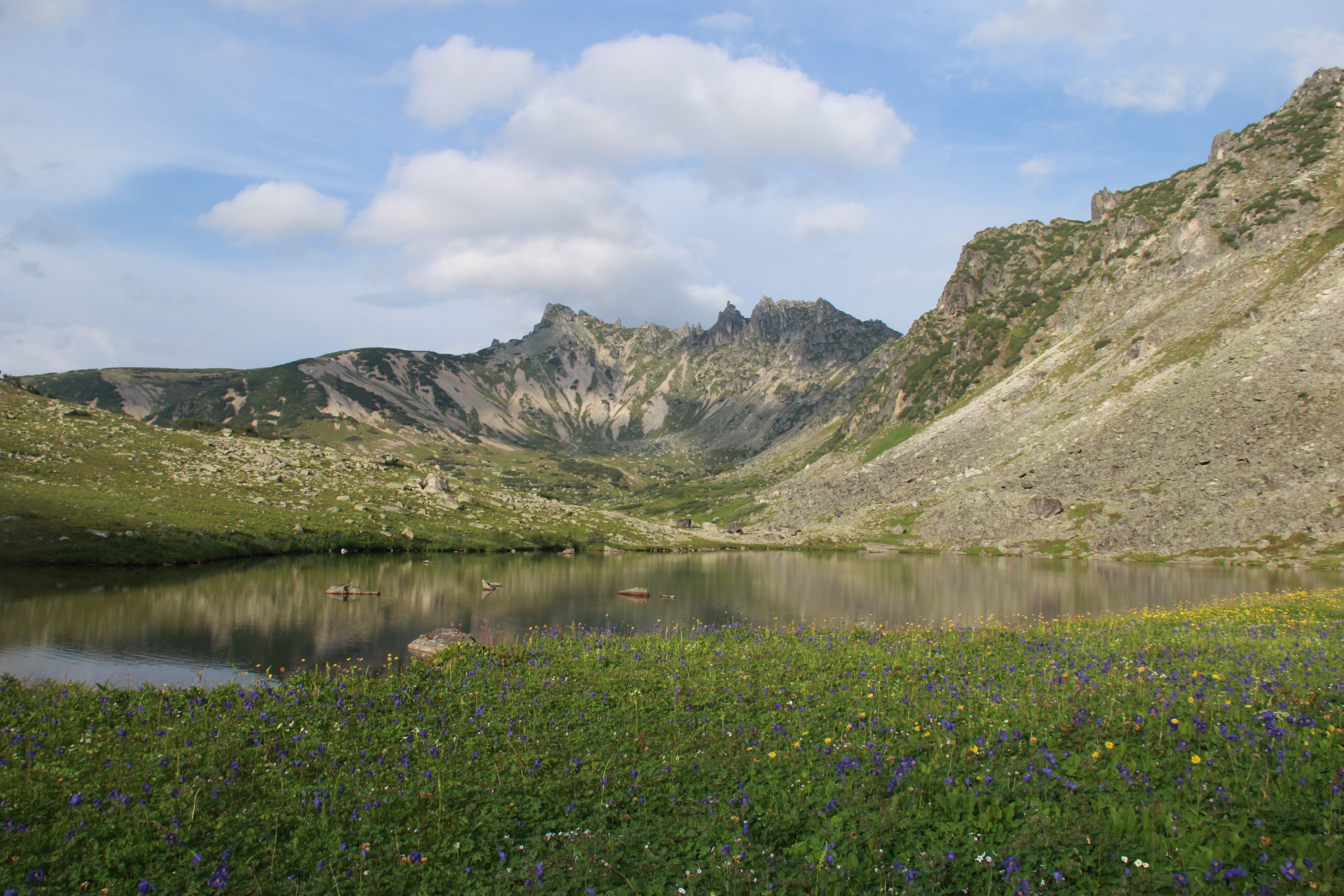
- Subalpine meadows, Barguzinsky Nature Reserve
- Interactive map of Barguzinsky Nature Reserve
- Location: Buryatia, Russia
- Nearest city: Ust-Barguzin
- Area: 2,482 km^{2} (958 sq mi)
- Established: 1916
- Governing body: FSE «Zapovednoye Podlemorye»
- Website: https://zapovednoe-podlemorye.ru/

UNESCO World Heritage Site
- Criteria: Natural: vii, viii, ix, x
- Reference: 754
- Inscription: 1996 (20th Session)

Barguzinsky Nature Reserve (Russian: Баргузинский заповедник) is the oldest of zapovedniks (nature reserves), established in 1916 for the protection of the Barguzin sable. It is located in Buryatia (Russia) on the west slope of the Barguzinsky Range, including the northeast shores of the Lake Baikal and a part of the lake itself. The area of the reserve is 2,482 km^{2} (958 sq mi), covering several types of boreal ecosystems, from bogs and taiga coniferous forests to subalpine meadows and mountain tundras. The landscape is postglacial, featuring rugged highlands, long river valleys and outwash, alluvial and lacustrine plains.

== History ==
Historically, the Barguzinsky range belonged to the Shemagir Evenks, who practiced fishing, reindeer herding and hunting. Trade with Russian merchants and leasing river valleys to hunters was Evenks' main source of income, especially since the remote area provided a habitat to the valuable subspecies of sable (Martes zibellina), the Barguzin sable. Sable fur had an extremely high value among European and Russian aristocracy, and by the end of the 19th century the population of sable had been noticeably depleted. The Imperial Ministry of Agriculture recognised the issue and in 1913 organised several expeditions in search for a suitable place to create hunting reserves. One of them, led by Georgiy Doppelmeyer, explored the Barguzinsky range, providing an extensive description of the local environment and economy and eventually leading to the creation of the first public nature reserve in Russia in 1916.

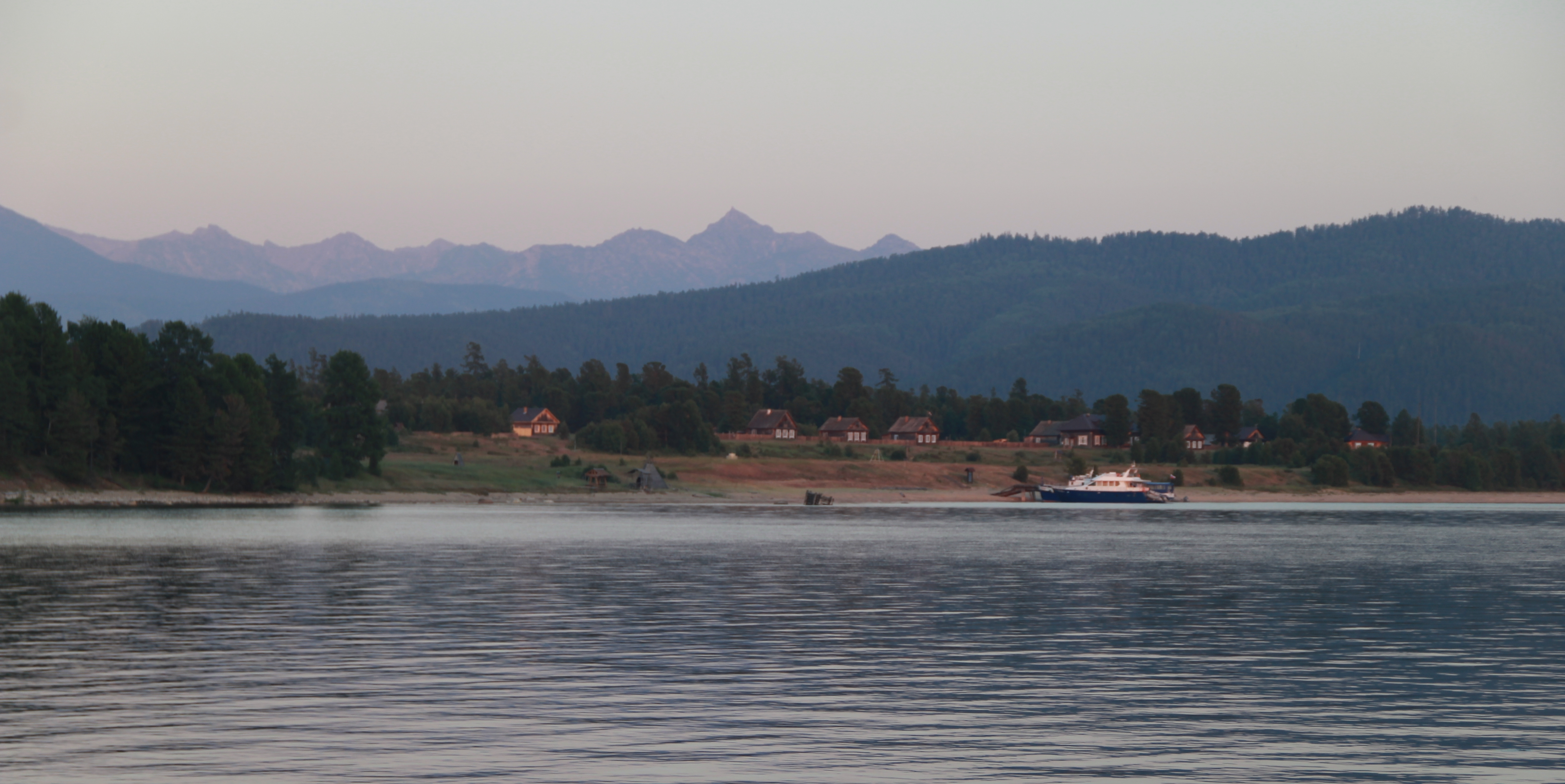
Davsha scientific village

The protected area initially consisted of a wildlife sanctuary, and a hunting reserve. The Evenks had been resettled to the northern Tompa River valley, and the first directorate of the reserve was set up in the former Evenk village of Sosnovka. The October Revolution and civil war hindered the reserve work, and systematic scientific and conservation activities only resumed in the 1940s. The directorate was moved to a newly established research village of Davsha, which is located closer to the geographic centre of the reserve. By the 1970s, the village has more than one hundred inhabitants, with an experimental sable nursery and a research station, administrative and scientific offices, a school, a bakery and an airfield with regular flights to Nizhneangarsk and Ulan-Ude, where the reserve had additional offices. However, after the dissolution of the USSR, cuts in funding led to the gradual depopulation of the village.

In 1986, the reserve became a UNESCO Biosphere Reserve. In 2009, the reserve assumed management of the Frolikhinsky Nature Reserve, located to the north along the Baikal shore. In 2012, a unified governing body, FSE (Federal State Establishment) "Zapovednoye Podlemorye", was formed, merging the teams of the reserve and Zabaikalsky National Park.

== Ecoregion and climate ==
Barguzinsky Reserve is located in the Trans-Baikal conifer forests ecoregion. This ecoregion covers the montane southern taiga forests, stretching east, and south from the shores of Lake Baikal in southern Russia, reaching into northern Mongolia. The climate of the Barguzinsky range is a Subarctic climate with dry winters (Subarctic climate (Dwc), according to Köppen climate classification). It is characterized by mild summers (only 1–3 months above 10 °C (50.0 °F)) and cold winters, having monthly precipitation less than one-tenth of the wettest summer month.

== Flora and fauna ==
The Barguzin Nature Reserve is inhabited by moose (commonly called 'elk' in Eurasia), musk deer (known as kabarga), roe deer, Eurasian wild boar, Altai wapiti (known as 'elk' in North America), Ussuri brown bear, grey wolf, raccoon dogs, black-capped marmot, grouse, capercaillie, hare, Siberian lynx, yellow-throated marten. Among the fish species, omul, sig, sturgeon, grayling, taimen, lenok are common in the Baikal Lake and its tributaries.

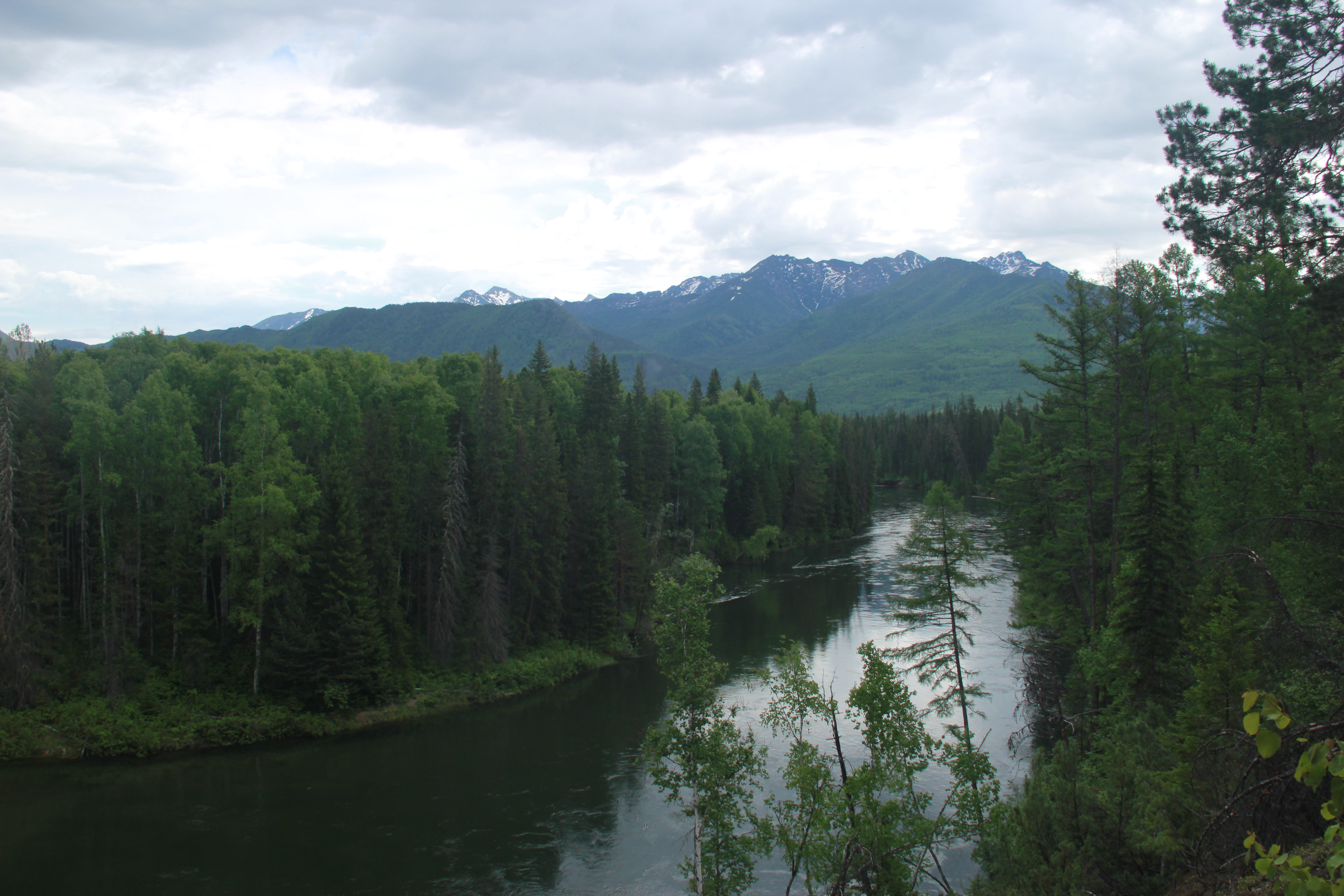
Boreal forest around the Bolshaya River

The reserve is located in several altitudinal zones. The coast of Baikal is adjacent to a narrow belt of lacustrine Baikal terraces (460–600 m above sea level), dominated by Siberian and Dahurian larch forests, with Siberian pine (cedar), Scots pine, birch forests, alternating with peat bogs and floodplain meadows. The lower and middle parts of the Barguzinsky ridge slopes (600–1250 m above sea level) are occupied by mountain taiga forests, mostly composed of Scots pine and Siberian pine. The upper tree line is constituted by birch krummholtz, fir and spruce forests of the subalpine belt, with subalpine meadows occupying stream valleys. The rest of the reserve is mountainous, with sparse dwarf pine vegetation on drier slopes, and shrubby alpine tundras on wetter ones.

== Related personnel ==
- Konstantin Zabelin (1885–1934), the first director of the reserve.
- Zenon Svatosh (1886–1949), a polar explorer and the second director of the reserve. The reserve Yaroslavets-class ship operating since the 1970s is named after Svatosh.
- Evgeny Chernikin (1928–2009), a prominent zoologist, specialising in sable ecology.
- Gennadiy Yankus (1940–2022), director in 1971–2011.
- Mikhail Ovdin (b. 1983), the current director.

== See also ==
- List of Russian Nature Reserves (class 1a 'zapovedniks')
