= Barguzin-class hovercraft =

Barguzin (Russian: Баргузин) is a class of Russian hovercraft riverboats. Three of them were built during 1989–1991 in the shipyard of Sosnovka, Kirov Oblast. Barguzin-1 and Barguzin-2 were delivered to Lake Baikal, Barguzin-3 was sold to Panama.
