= Barguzin Range =

Mountain range in Buryatia, Russia

- Russian: Баргузинский хребет
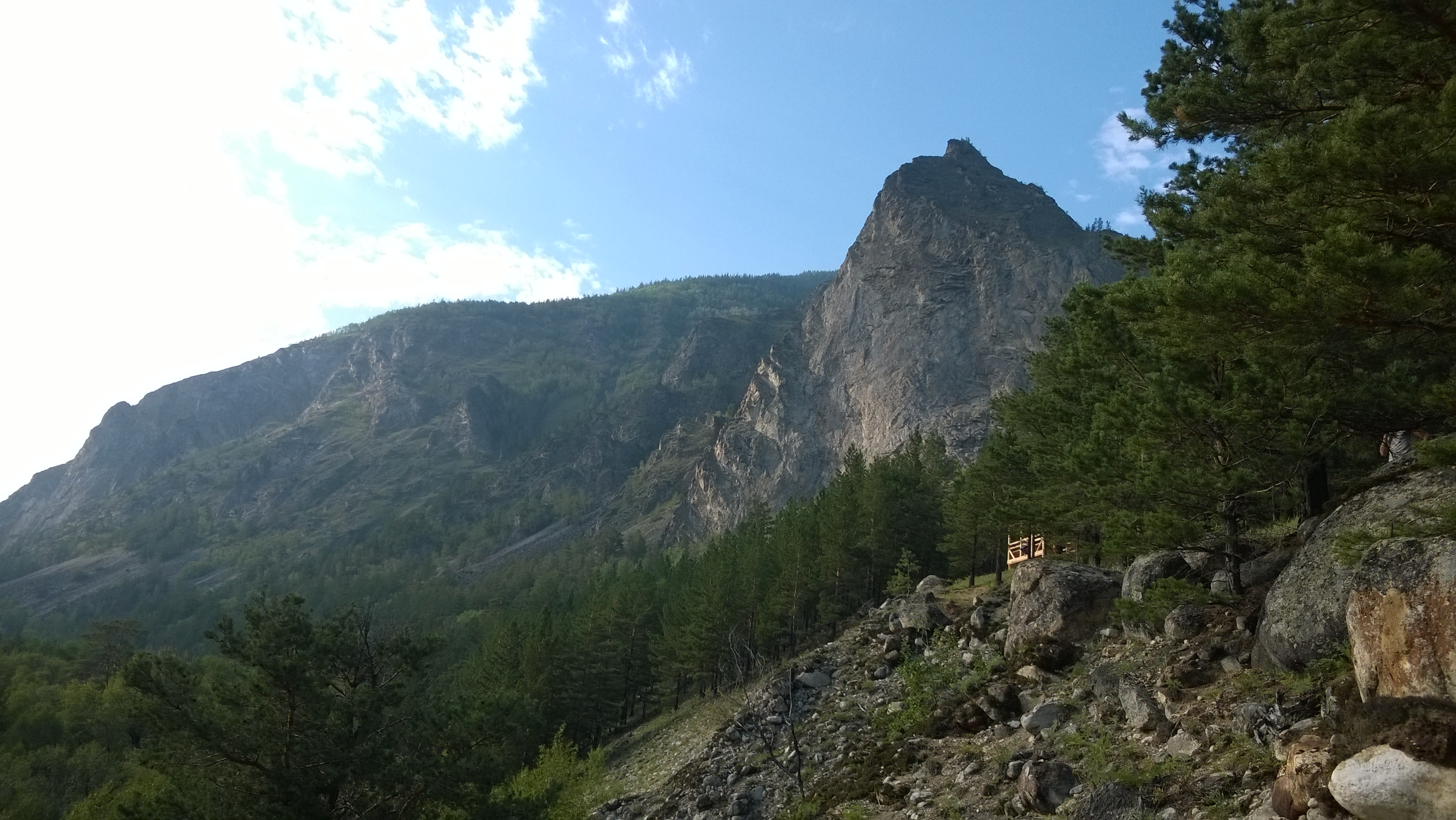

Highest point
- Peak: Baikal Peak
- Elevation: 2,840 m (9,320 ft)

Geography
- Location within Republic of Buryatia
- Country: Russia
- Federal subject: Buryatia
- Range coordinates: 54°42′N 110°24′E
- Parent range: South Siberian Mountains

Geology
- Rock age: Upper Proterozoic
- Rock type(s): Granite, shale

Climbing
- Easiest route: From Ulan-Ude

Barguzin Range (Russian: Баргузинский хребет) is a mountain range in Buryatia, Russia along the northeastern shore of Baikal.

Its length is 280 km, height up to 2,840 m. It is mostly covered by larch taiga. The range bounds the Barguzin Valley on the northwest. A part of the Barguzin Nature Reserve is located on the western slopes of the range.

== See also ==
- List of ultras of Northeast Asia
- South Siberian Mountains
