= Barguzin (river) =

River in Russia

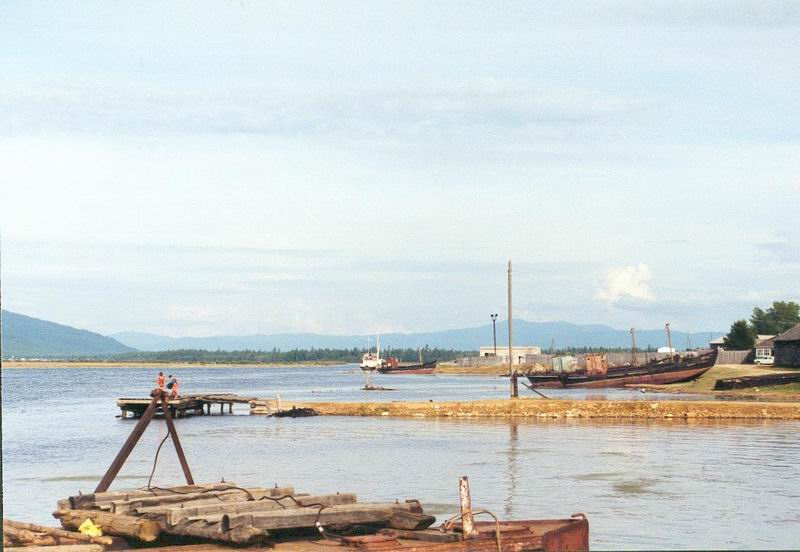
- The Barguzin at Lake Baikal

Location
- Country: Russia

Physical characteristics
- Mouth: Lake Baikal
  - coordinates: 53.425°N 108.997°E
- Length: 480 km (300 mi)
- Basin size: 21,100 km^{2} (8,100 sq mi)

Basin features
- Progression: Lake Baikal→ Angara→ Yenisey→ Kara Sea

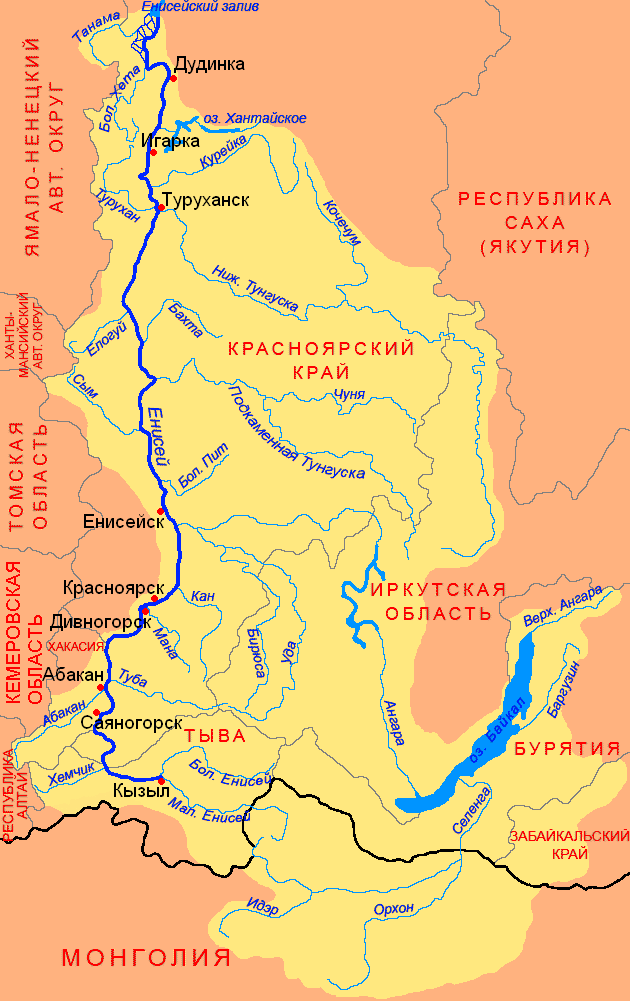
Yenisey basin including Lake Baikal and the river Barguzin

The Barguzin (Russian: Баргузи́н; Buryat: Баргажан, romanized: Bargajan) is a river in Buryatia, Russia, 480 km (300 mi) long, flowing into the Barguzin Bay of Lake Baikal, the largest and deepest bay of Baikal. Barguzin is the third (by the flow amount) inflow of Baikal, after the rivers Selenga and Upper Angara. Its watershed area is 21,100 km^{2} (8,100 mi^{2}). It is navigable for 204 km (127 mi) upwards from its estuary. Its main tributaries are the Gagra, Argada and Ina from the left, and the Ulyun from the right. In 1648, Ivan Galkin founded an ostrog on the Barguzin.

== Valley ==
In its middle part, the river flows along the Barguzin Valley or Depression (Russian: Баргузинская котловина), which is 200 km (120 mi) long and up to 35 km (22 mi) wide and runs between the Barguzin Range (to the northwest) and Ikat Range (to the southeast). It also forms the western limit of the Southern Muya Range. In the valley, the river branches, loops, leaves old riverbeds, and creates a swampy water network with more than 1,000 lakes. In the valley is the Dzherga Nature Reserve (Russian: Джергинский государственный природный заповедник) encompassing 2,387 km^{2} (922 mi^{2}).

== Wind ==
The river also gave its name to a steady, strong wind on Baikal. The air flow rushes onto Baikal from the Barguzin Valley and blows across the lake at its middle, mostly for no longer than a day (starting at sunrise and ending by sunset). Usually it brings sunny weather. In Barguzin Bay, it may be of hurricane strength, but its average speed is usually less than 20 m/s. The wind is commemorated in the Russian folk song about a runaway from the Akatuy katorga:

Славное море - священный Байкал,
Славный корабль - омулевая бочка.
Эй, баргузин, пошевеливай вал,
Молодцу плыть недалечко.

The sacred Baikal is a glorious sea,
An omul barrel is a glorious ship.
Hey, barguzin, roll the wave
It is not too far to sail for a daring fellow.

Poetic translation:

Glorious sea, sacred Baikal,
Glorious boat, a barrel of cisco
Hey, Barguzin make the waves rise and fall!
This young lad's ready to frisk-o!
