= Kurumkan =

Kurumkan Курумкан
- Settlement
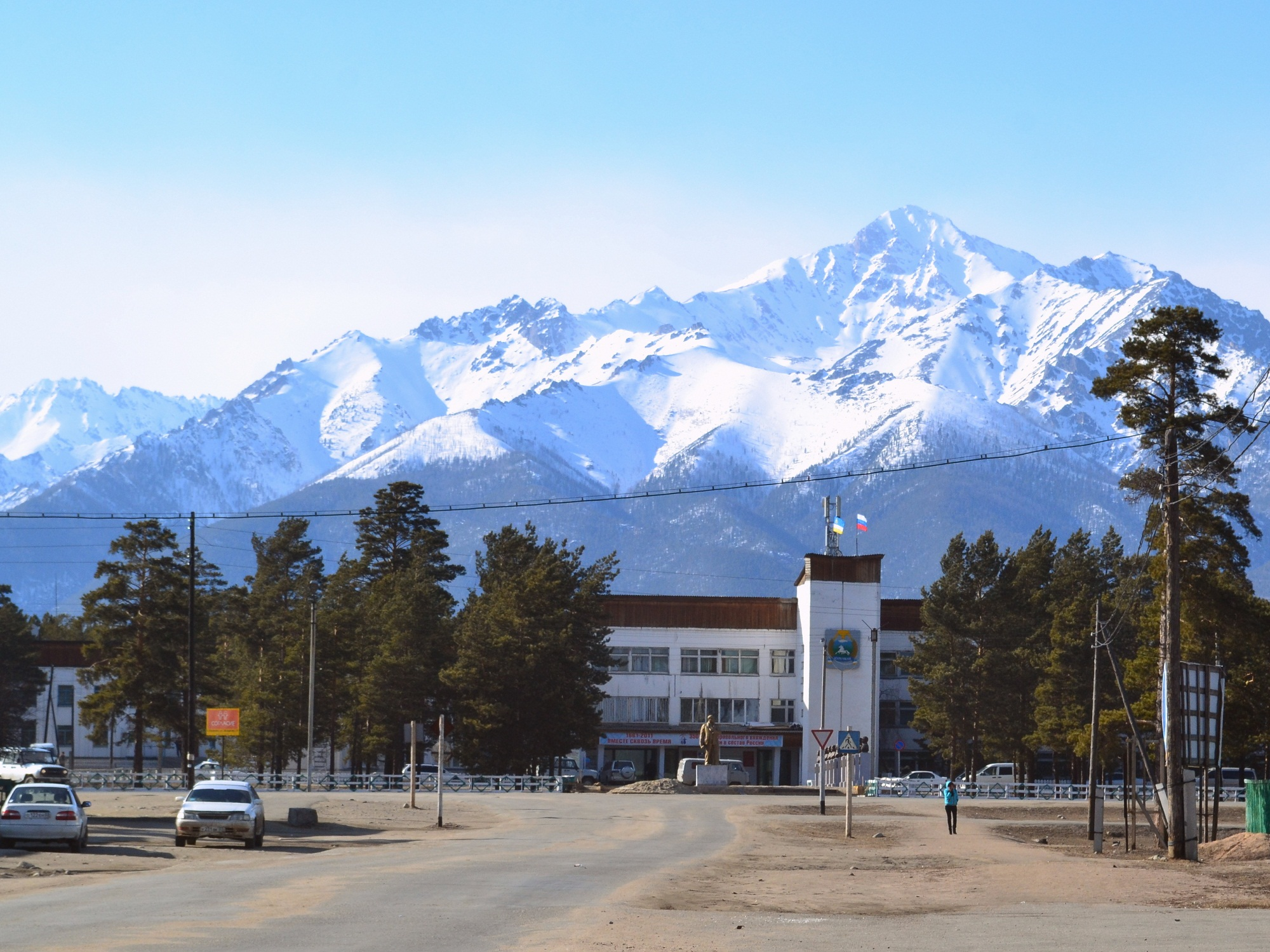
- The Barguzin Range rising above Kurumkan

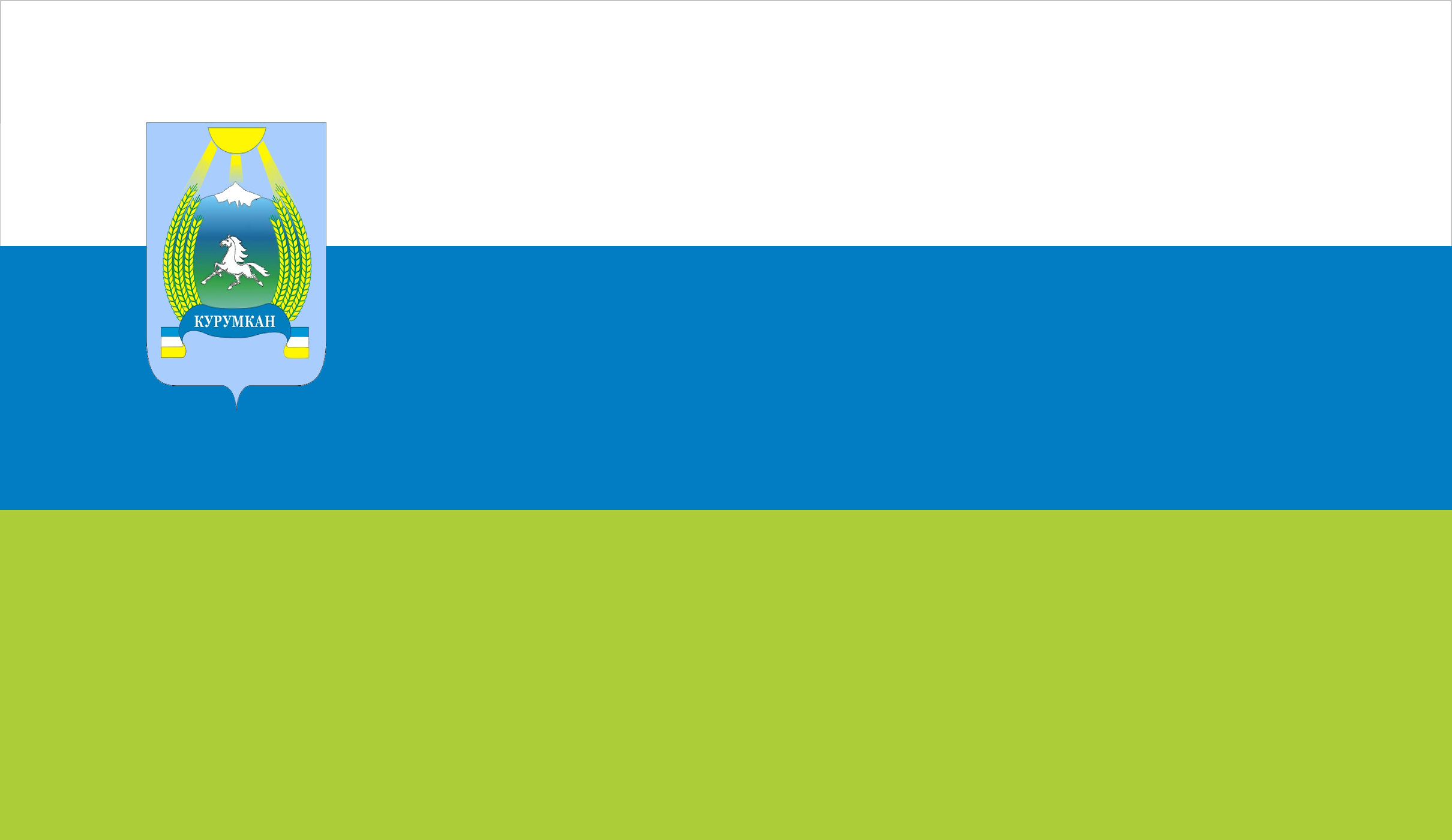
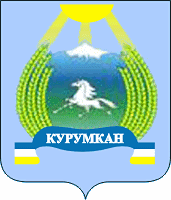
- Flag Seal

- Location within Republic of Buryatia Location within Russia
- Coordinates: 54°19′N 110°19′E
- Country: Russia
- Region: Republic of Buryatia
- District: Kurumkansky District
- Time zone: UTC+8:00

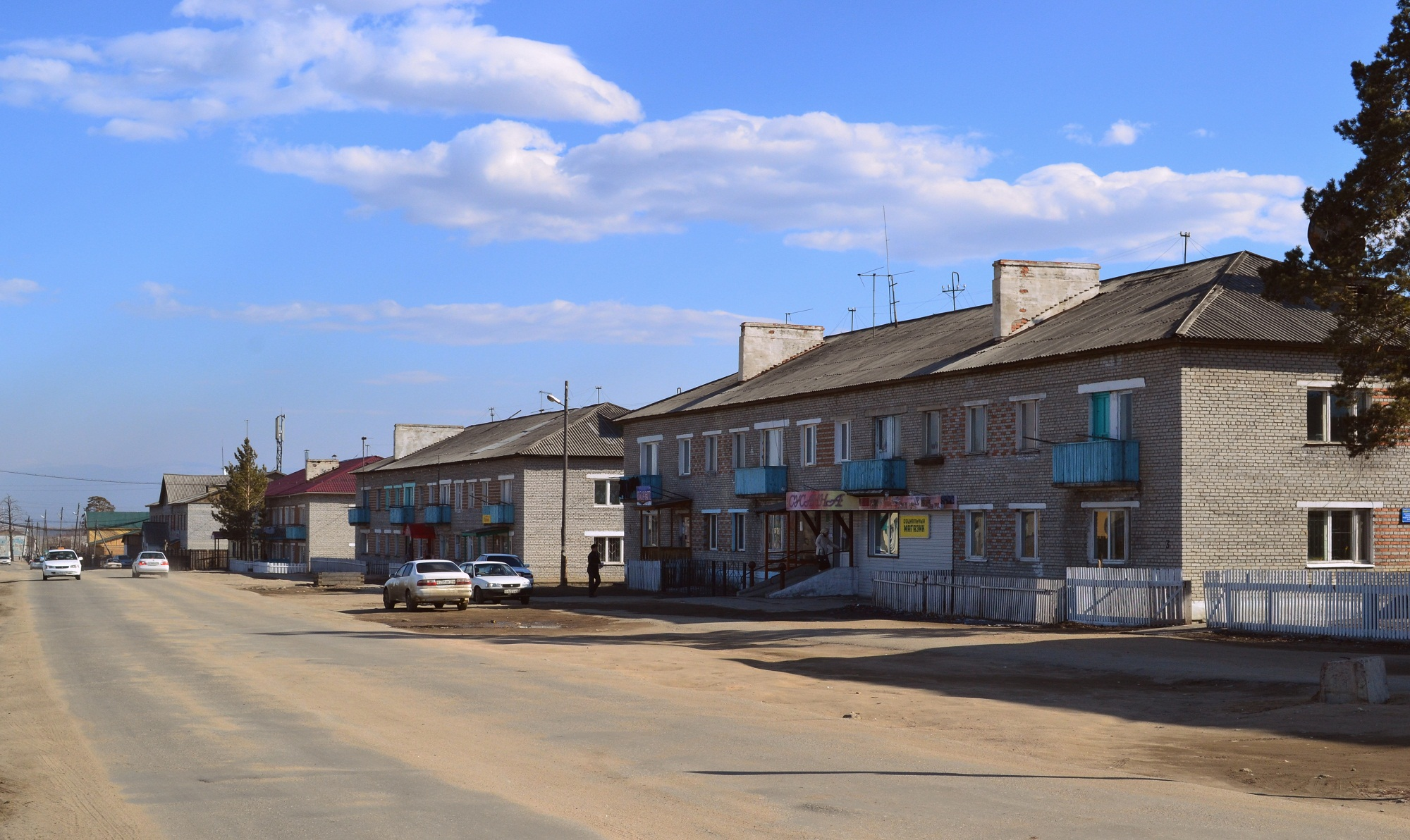
One of the streets in Kurumkan, Kurumkansky district, Buryatia

Kurumkan (Russian: Курумка́н; Buryat and Mongolian: Хурамхаан, Khuramkhaan) is a rural locality (a selo) and the administrative center of Kurumkansky District of the Republic of Buryatia, Russia, located 413 kilometers (257 mi) from Ulan-Ude. Population: 5,465 (2010 census); 5,957 (2002 census); 6,687 (1989 Soviet census).

== Etymology ==
The name "Kurumkan" comes from the Evenk language and means a stone river.

== Geography ==
Kurumkan is located by the Barguzin River, with the Barguzin Range rising to the west.

== Transportation ==
There is a bus that runs twice a day between Ulan-Ude and Kurumkan.
