= Kurumkansky District =

Kurumkansky District Курумканский район (Russian)
- District

Other transcription(s)
  - Buryat: Хурамхаанай аймаг
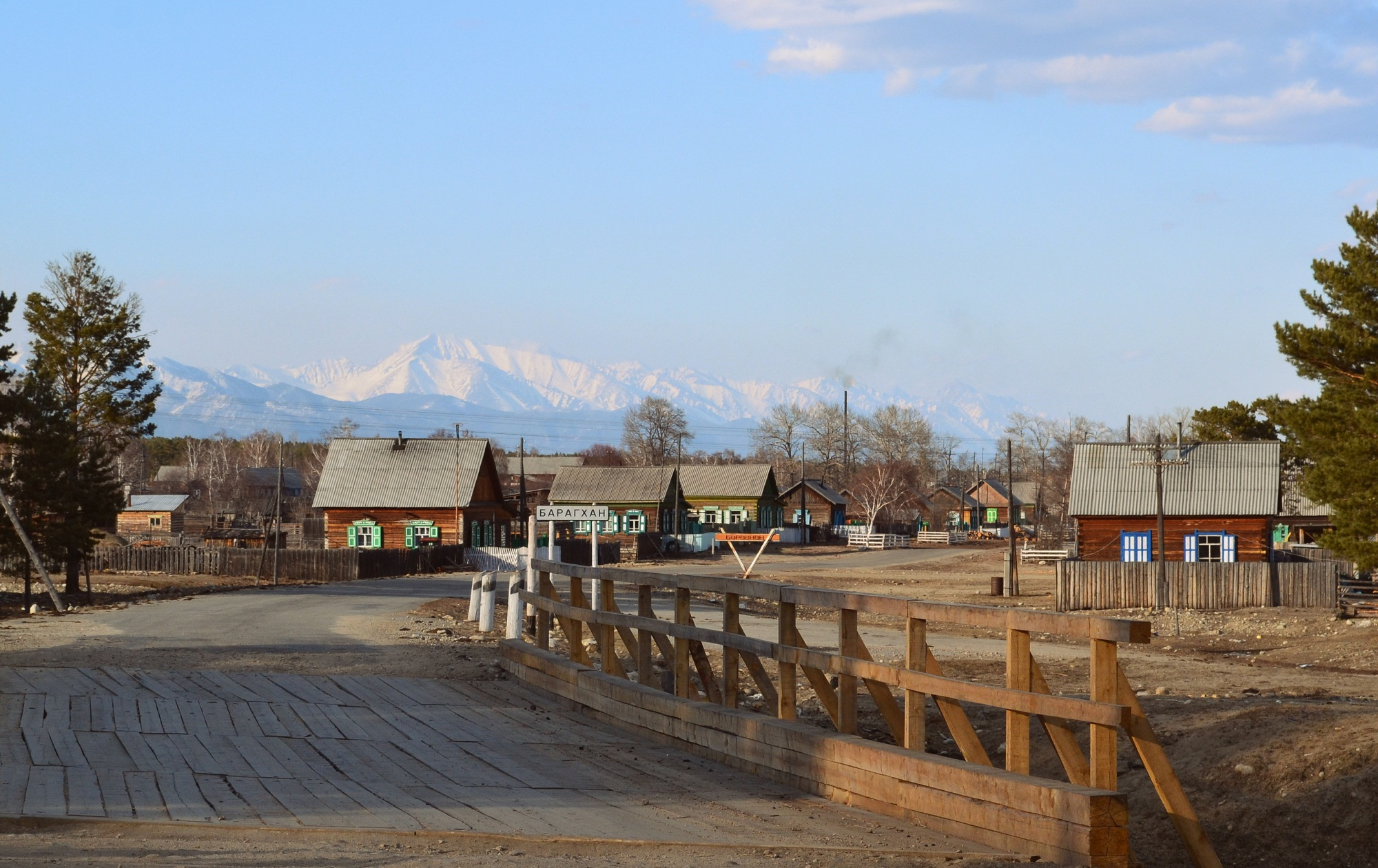
- Village (selo) Baraghan, Kurumkansky District

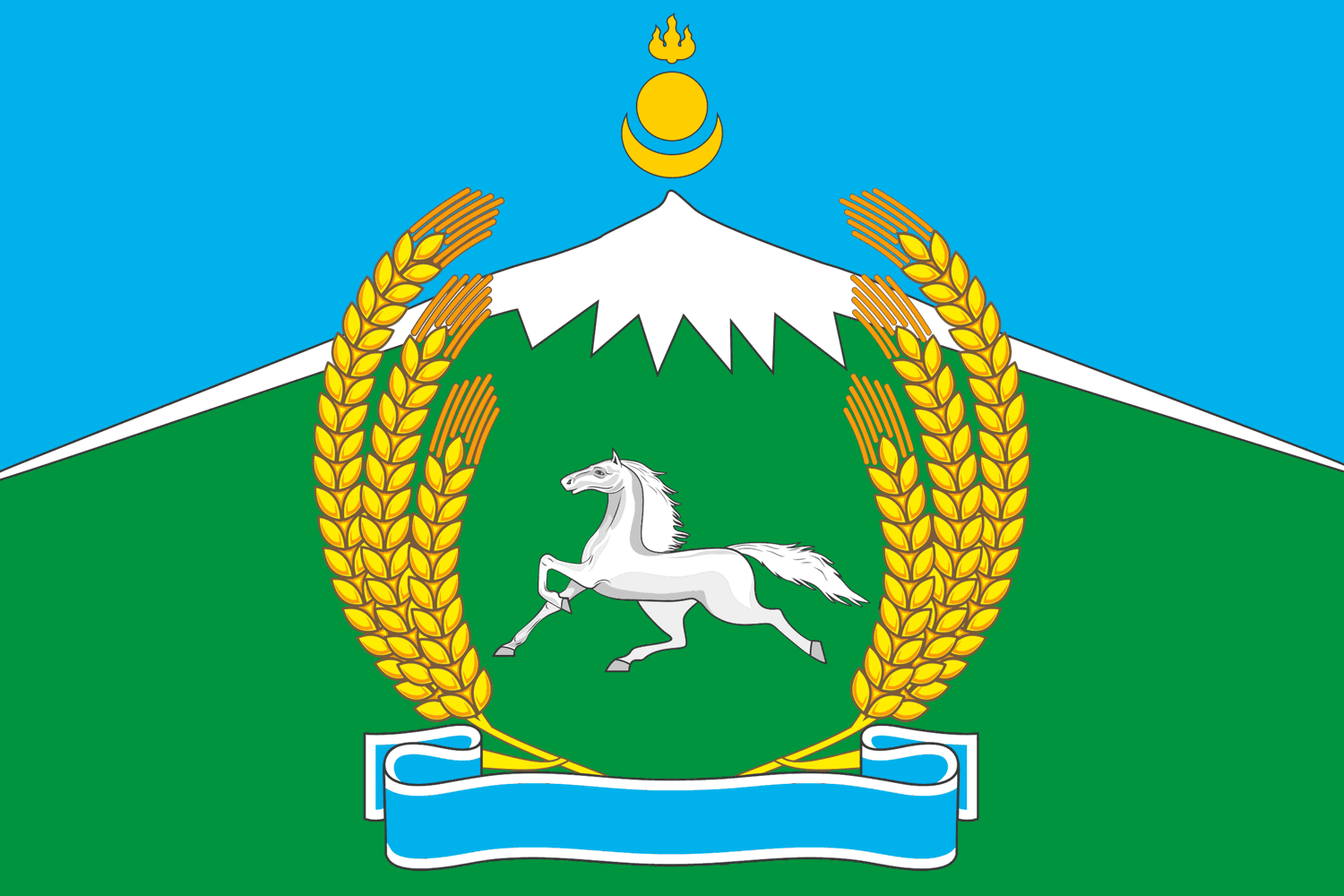
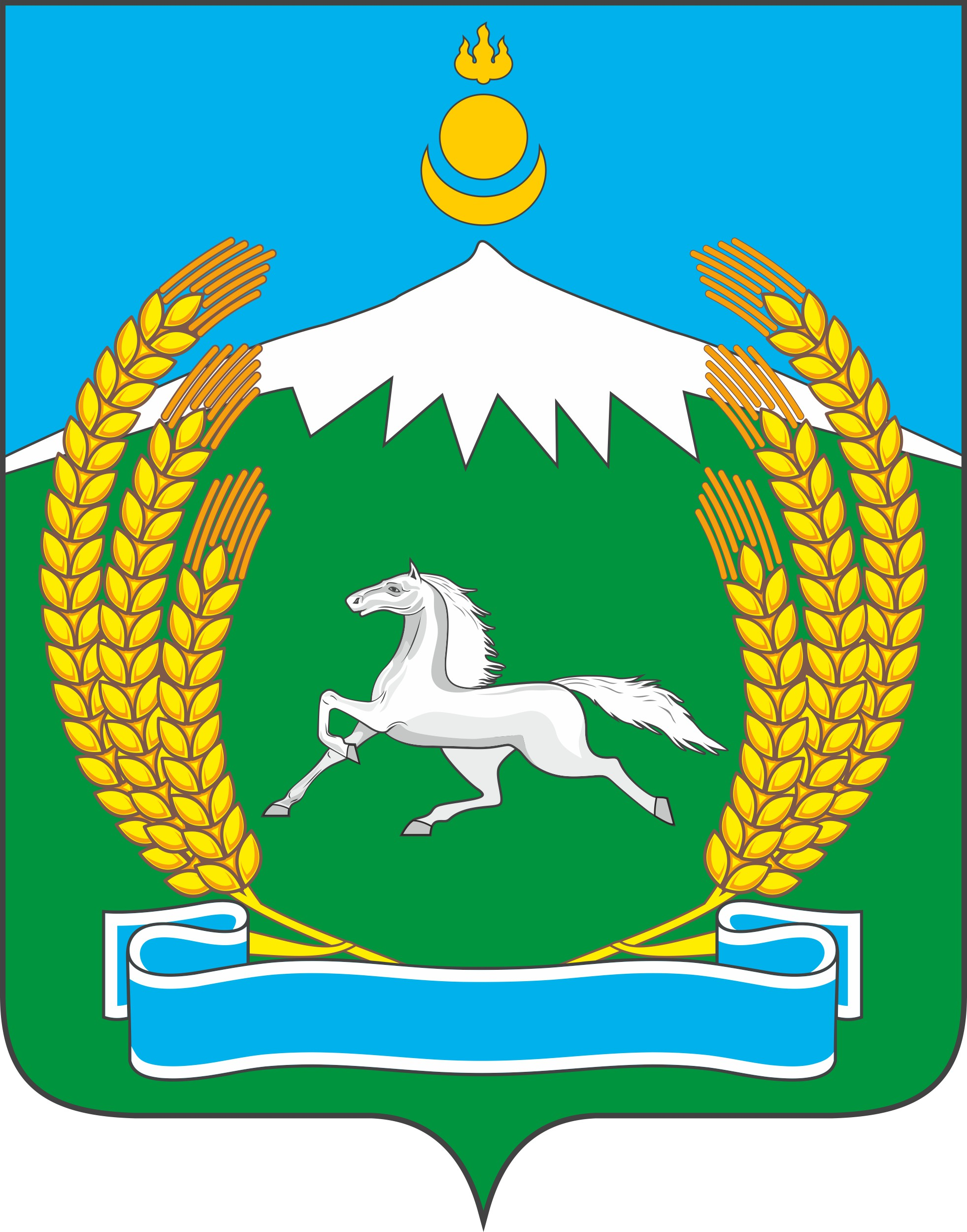
- Flag Coat of arms
- Location of Kurumkansky District in the Buryat Republic
- Coordinates: 54°19′N 110°19′E
- Country: Russia
- Federal subject: Republic of Buryatia
- Established: December 11, 1970
- Administrative center: Kurumkan

Area
  - Total: 12,450 km^{2} (4,810 sq mi)

Population (2010 Census)
  - Total: 15,007
  - Density: 1.205/km^{2} (3.122/sq mi)
  - Urban: 0%
  - Rural: 100%

Administrative structure
  - Administrative divisions: 5 Selsoviets, 4 Somons
  - Inhabited localities: 28 rural localities

Municipal structure
  - Municipally incorporated as: Kurumkansky Municipal District
  - Municipal divisions: 0 urban settlements, 10 rural settlements
- Time zone: UTC+8 (MSK+5)
- OKTMO ID: 81630000
- Website: http://kurumkan.burnet.ru

Population of Kurumkansky District
- 2010 Census: 15,007
- 2002 Census: 16,235
- 1989 Census: 18,852
- 1979 Census: 17,928

Kurumkansky District (Russian: Курумка́нский райо́н; Buryat: Хурамхаанай аймаг, Khuramkhaanai aimag) is an administrative and municipal district (raion), one of the twenty-one in the Republic of Buryatia, Russia. It is located in the northeast of the republic. The area of the district is 12,450 square kilometers (4,810 sq mi). Its administrative center is the rural locality (a selo) of Kurumkan. As of the 2010 Census, the total population of the district was 15,007, with the population of Kurumkan accounting for 36.4% of that number.

== History ==
The district was established on December 11, 1970.

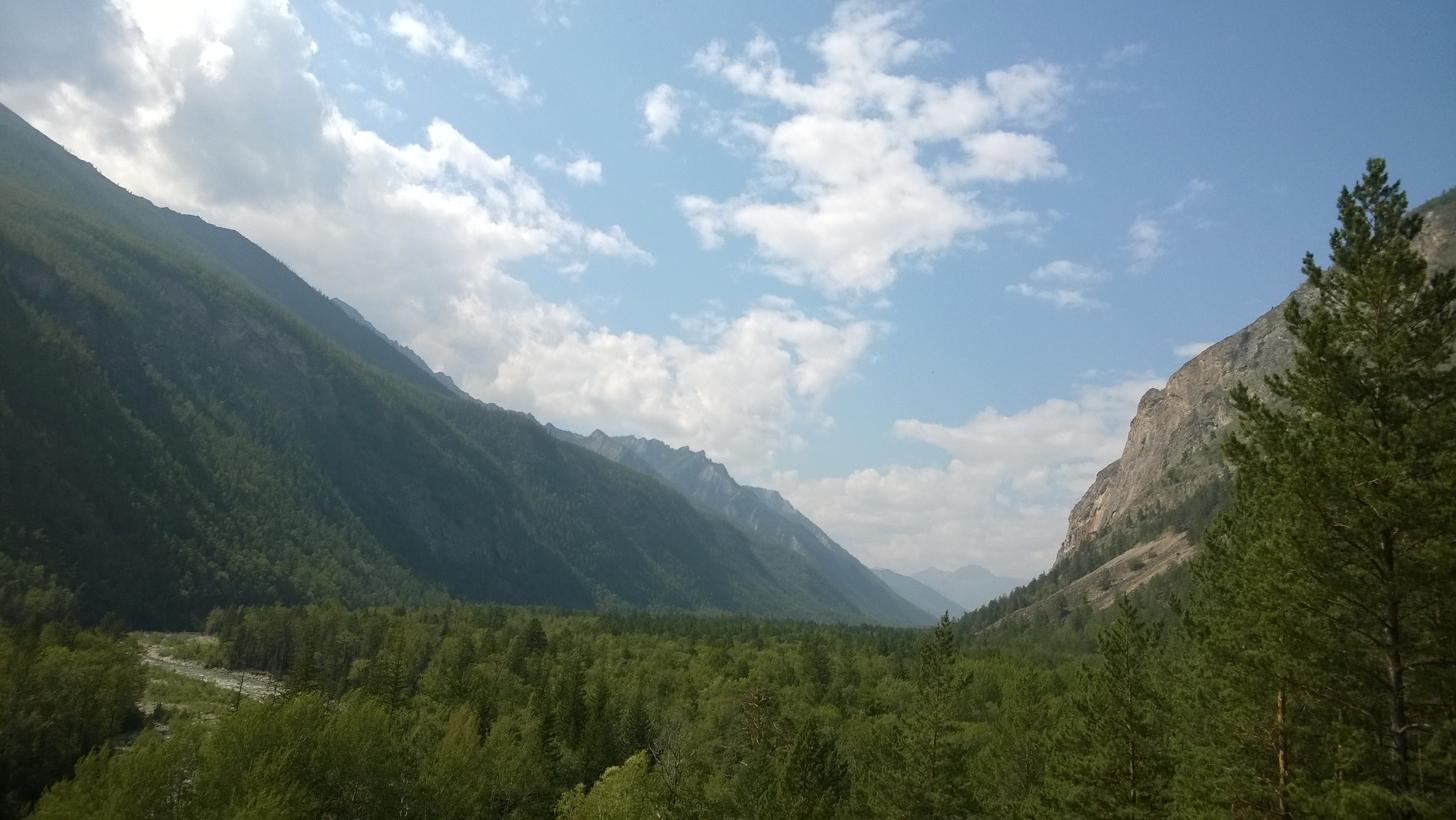
Resort Alla Alla, Kurumkansky District, Buryatia

== Administrative and municipal status ==
Within the framework of administrative divisions, Kurumkansky District is one of the twenty-one in the Republic of Buryatia. The district is divided into five selsoviets and four somons, which comprise twenty-eight rural localities. As a municipal division, the district is incorporated as Kurumkansky Municipal District. Its five selsoviets and four somons are incorporated as ten rural settlements within the municipal district. The selo of Kurumkan serves as the administrative center of both the administrative and municipal district.

== Demographics ==
As of the 2010 Census the ethnic breakdown of Kurumkansky District was the following:
Buryats: 65.04%
Russians: 30.07%
Evenks: 2.03%
Tatars: 0.08%
Ukrainians: 0.01%
Belarusians: 0.01%
Azerbaijanis: 0.01%
Others: 0.05%
